= National Register of Historic Places listings in Lexington County, South Carolina =

Location of Lexington County in South Carolina

This is a list of the National Register of Historic Places listings in Lexington County, South Carolina.

This is intended to be a complete list of the properties and districts on the National Register of Historic Places in Lexington County, South Carolina, United States. The locations of National Register properties and districts for which the latitude and longitude coordinates are included below, may be seen in a map.

There are 64 properties and districts listed on the National Register in the county. Another 3 properties were once listed but have been removed.

This National Park Service list is complete through NPS recent listings posted August 21, 2026.

== Current listings ==
	Name on the Register	Image	Date listed	Location	City or town	Description
1	Ballentine-Shealy House	Ballentine-Shealy House	November 22, 1983 (#83003858)	South Carolina Highway 1323; 34°06′17″N 81°22′55″W	Lexington	Late 18th- or early 19th- century log home, sheathed in weatherboard; with ancillary buildings.
2	Bank of Western Carolina	Bank of Western Carolina	November 22, 1983 (#83003860)	126 Main St. 33°58′53″N 81°14′12″W	Lexington	
3	D. D. D. Barr House	D. D. D. Barr House	November 22, 1983 (#83003866)	Off South Carolina Highway 245; 33°56′12″N 81°31′38″W	Batesburg-Leesville	
4	Batesburg Commercial Historic District	Batesburg Commercial Historic District	July 6, 1982 (#82003875)	Granite, Oak, Pine, and Church Sts., and Rutland and N. Railroad Aves. 33°54′25″N 81°32′54″W	Batesburg-Leesville	
5	W. Q. M. Berly House	W. Q. M. Berly House	November 22, 1983 (#83003870)	122 Berly St. 33°59′14″N 81°14′30″W	Lexington	
6	William Berly House	William Berly House	November 23, 1977 (#77001230)	121 Berly St. 33°59′14″N 81°14′29″W	Lexington	
7	Lemuel Boozer House	Lemuel Boozer House	August 16, 1977 (#77001231)	320 W. Main St. 33°59′06″N 81°14′32″W	Lexington	
8	Simon Bouknight House	Simon Bouknight House	July 6, 1982 (#82003876)	Saluda Ave. 33°54′32″N 81°33′10″W	Batesburg-Leesville	
9	Cartledge House	Cartledge House	July 6, 1982 (#82003879)	305 Saluda Ave. 33°54′31″N 81°33′08″W	Batesburg-Leesville	
10	William J. Cayce House	William J. Cayce House	April 16, 1975 (#75001703)	517 Holland Ave. 33°58′31″N 81°03′13″W	Cayce	
11	Cedar Grove Lutheran Church	Cedar Grove Lutheran Church	November 17, 2010 (#10000922)	1220 Cedar Grove Rd. 33°59′13″N 81°27′35″W	Batesburg-Leesville	
12	Chapin Commercial Historic District		October 7, 2019 (#100004495)	Bounded by Lexington Ave., Beaufort St., Chapin Rd., and the rear lots along Columbia Ave. 34°09′59″N 81°20′58″W	Chapin	
13	Church Street Historic District	Church Street Historic District	July 6, 1982 (#82003884)	Church St. 33°55′09″N 81°30′24″W	Batesburg-Leesville	
14	Colonial-Hites Company	Colonial-Hites Company	May 24, 2018 (#100002526)	228 N Parson St. 33°59′18″N 81°04′39″W	West Columbia	
15	"Congarees" Site		December 31, 1974 (#74002261)	Address Restricted	Cayce	
16	C.E. Corley House	C.E. Corley House	November 22, 1983 (#83003872)	808 S. Lake Dr. 33°58′00″N 81°14′02″W	Lexington	
17	Jacob Wingard Dreher House	Jacob Wingard Dreher House	November 22, 1983 (#83003875)	Off South Carolina Highway 6; 34°04′13″N 81°14′27″W	Irmo	
18	Broadus Edwards House	Broadus Edwards House	July 6, 1982 (#82003877)	12 Peachtree St. 33°54′12″N 81°33′03″W	Batesburg-Leesville	
19	Fox House	Fox House	July 1, 1970 (#70000893)	232 Fox St. 33°59′14″N 81°14′23″W	Lexington	
20	Gervais Street Bridge	Gervais Street Bridge	November 25, 1980 (#80003676)	Spans the Congaree River; 33°59′47″N 81°02′55″W	West Columbia	Extends into Columbia in Richland County
21	David Jefferson Griffith House		November 22, 1983 (#83003879)	Address Restricted	Gilbert	
22	Guignard Brick Works	Guignard Brick Works	February 13, 1995 (#95000019)	100 Granby Crossing at Knox Abbot Dr. 33°59′16″N 81°03′02″W	Cayce	
23	Gunter-Summers House	Gunter-Summers House	November 10, 1987 (#87001988)	841 Center St. 33°59′24″N 81°04′00″W	Lexington	
24	Hampton Hendrix Office		July 6, 1982 (#82003885)	Leesville Ave. 33°55′05″N 81°30′50″W	Batesburg-Leesville	
25	James Harman Building	James Harman Building	November 22, 1983 (#83003903)	Gantt St. 33°58′55″N 81°14′09″W	Lexington	
26	Hartley House	Hartley House	July 9, 1982 (#82003878)	305 E. Columbia Ave. 33°54′23″N 81°32′27″W	Batesburg-Leesville	
27	Ernest L. Hazelius House	Ernest L. Hazelius House	May 11, 1973 (#73001717)	Fox St. 33°59′14″N 81°14′26″W	Lexington	
28	John Solomon Hendrix House	John Solomon Hendrix House	November 22, 1983 (#83003904)	Old Cherokee Rd. 34°00′14″N 81°17′09″W	Lexington	
29	Thomas Galbraith Herbert House	Thomas Galbraith Herbert House	July 6, 1982 (#82003887)	506 Trotter St. 33°55′32″N 81°31′05″W	Batesburg-Leesville	
30	John Jacob Hite Farm		November 22, 1983 (#83003908)	Address Restricted	Lexington	
31	J.B. Holman House	J.B. Holman House	July 6, 1982 (#82003888)	N. Peachtree St. 33°54′18″N 81°33′07″W	Batesburg-Leesville	
32	Home National Bank	Home National Bank	November 22, 1983 (#83003909)	Main St. and North Lake Dr. 33°58′52″N 81°14′09″W	Lexington	
33	A.C. Jones House	A.C. Jones House	July 6, 1982 (#82003880)	104 Fair Ave. 33°54′22″N 81°32′33″W	Batesburg-Leesville	
34	Lakeview School	Lakeview School	January 31, 2023 (#100008590)	1218 Batchelor St. 33°59′32″N 81°04′35″W	West Columbia	
35	Leesville College Historic District	Leesville College Historic District	July 6, 1982 (#82003889)	Railroad Ave. and College, Peachtree, King, and Lee Sts. 33°55′14″N 81°30′55″W	Batesburg-Leesville	
36	Lexington County Courthouse	Lexington County Courthouse	April 21, 2014 (#14000164)	139 E. Main St. 33°58′53″N 81°14′11″W	Lexington	
37	Henry Lybrand Farm		November 22, 1983 (#83003911)	Address Restricted	Lexington	
38	Manning Archeological Site		December 14, 1978 (#78002522)	Address Restricted	Cayce	
39	Maj. Henry A. Meetze House	Maj. Henry A. Meetze House	July 13, 1979 (#79002387)	South of Lexington at 723 S. Lake Dr. 33°58′06″N 81°14′04″W	Lexington	
40	Crowell Mitchell House		July 6, 1982 (#82003890)	Church St. 33°55′02″N 81°30′40″W	Batesburg-Leesville	
41	McKendree Mitchell House	McKendree Mitchell House	July 6, 1982 (#82003881)	310 Saluda Ave. 33°54′35″N 81°33′09″W	Batesburg-Leesville	
42	Mitchell-Shealy House	Mitchell-Shealy House	July 6, 1982 (#82003891)	419 W. Church St. 33°54′39″N 81°31′37″W	Batesburg-Leesville	
43	Mount Hebron Temperance Hall	Mount Hebron Temperance Hall	November 24, 1980 (#80003677)	3041 Leaphart Rd. 33°59′58″N 81°07′29″W	West Columbia	
44	Music Hall Evangelical Lutheran Church		November 22, 1983 (#83003913)	Address Restricted	Gilbert	
45	New Brookland Historic District	New Brookland Historic District	October 10, 1978 (#78002524)	Roughly bounded by Alexander Rd. and Augusta, State, Spring, and Meeting Sts. 33°59′34″N 81°03′17″W	West Columbia	
46	Old Batesburg Grade School	Old Batesburg Grade School	May 27, 1983 (#83002201)	306 E. Columbia Ave; 33°54′23″N 81°32′23″W	Batesburg-Leesville	
47	Old Batesburg-Leesville High School	Old Batesburg-Leesville High School	July 6, 1982 (#82003893)	Columbia Ave at Shealy Rd; 33°54′39″N 81°32′24″W	Batesburg-Leesville	
48	Peter M. and Alice Oliver House	Peter M. and Alice Oliver House	January 6, 2023 (#100008531)	295 West 1st St. 33°44′20″N 81°06′08″W	Swansea	
49	Professional Building		September 29, 2025 (#100012319)	528-532 Knox Abbott Drive; 33°59′01″N 81°03′34″W	Cayce	
50	Charlton Rauch House	Charlton Rauch House	November 22, 1983 (#83003914)	Main and Cedar Sts. 33°59′03″N 81°14′26″W	Lexington	
51	David Rawl House	David Rawl House	November 22, 1983 (#83003915)	201 W. Main St. 33°58′59″N 81°14′21″W	Lexington	
52	John Jacob Rawl House	John Jacob Rawl House	July 6, 1982 (#82003882)	Line St. 33°54′33″N 81°32′53″W	Batesburg-Leesville	
53	Rawl-Couch House	Rawl-Couch House	July 6, 1982 (#82003883)	22 Short St. 33°54′29″N 81°33′14″W	Batesburg-Leesville	
54	Robinson-Hiller House	Robinson-Hiller House	May 18, 1998 (#98000420)	113 Virginia St. 34°09′57″N 81°21′20″W	Chapin	
55	St. Michael's Evangelical Lutheran Church		July 24, 2023 (#83004664)	North of State Road 38; 34°04′23″N 81°14′28″W	Irmo vicinity	
56	Saluda Factory Historic District		May 25, 1973 (#73001718)	Along the Saluda River southeast of the junction of Interstates 26 and 126; 34°00′37″N 81°04′49″W	West Columbia	Site of a textile mill built in 1830 that was burned twice and other businesses. Maintained by the Riverbanks Zoo and Garden.
57	SAM Site		December 6, 1978 (#78002523)	Address Restricted	Cayce	A South Appalachian Mississippian site
58	Simmons-Harth House	Simmons-Harth House	November 22, 1983 (#83003916)	102 Gantt St. 33°58′54″N 81°14′09″W	Lexington	
59	Southern Railway Depot	Southern Railway Depot	May 27, 1983 (#83002202)	Southeast corner of Perry and Wilson Sts. 33°54′22″N 81°32′33″W	Batesburg-Leesville	
60	James Stewart House		November 22, 1983 (#83003917)	Address Restricted	Lexington	
61	Still Hopes	Still Hopes	November 22, 1983 (#83003921)	Off 7th St. 33°59′08″N 81°03′44″W	Cayce	Also known as the G. A. Guignard House
62	Taylor Site		November 21, 1974 (#74001864)	Address Restricted	Cayce	
63	Vastine Wessinger House		November 22, 1983 (#83003923)	Address Restricted	Lexington	
64	Rev. Frank Yarborough House	Rev. Frank Yarborough House	July 6, 1982 (#82003892)	810 Bernard St. 33°55′30″N 81°30′57″W	Batesburg-Leesville	

== Former listings ==
	Name on the Register	Image	Date listed	Date removed	Location	City or town	Description
1	George's Grist and Flour Mill		November 22, 1983 (#83003877)	March 15, 2005	Gibson's Pond Rd.	Lexington	Destroyed by fire on April 6, 1992.
2	Henry Franklin Hendrix House	Henry Franklin Hendrix House	July 6, 1982 (#82003886)	August 1, 2025	Hendrix Heights Plantation; 33°54′56″N 81°31′33″W	Batesburg-Leesville	
3	Timmerman Law Office		November 22, 1983 (#83003922)	December 8, 2005	207 E. Main St.(Original location. Now located at:); 33°58′54″N 81°14′04″W	Lexington	Moved

== See also ==
- List of National Historic Landmarks in South Carolina
- National Register of Historic Places listings in South Carolina
