= Mattie Jean Adams =

- Born: September 16, 1873
- Died: December 26, 1947 (aged 74)
- Education: Leesville College; South Carolina College (BA); Oxford University (MA)
- Occupation: Educator
- Known for: First woman to graduate from South Carolina College

== Personal life and Education ==
Mattie Jean Adams was born on September 16, 1873, in Utopia, Newberry County. She was the daughter of Eliza Kelley and Thomas Hill Adams. Mattie was an American author and women's rights activist, best known as pioneering figure in higher education, as the first woman to graduate from South Carolina College. She aspired to become a teacher and earned a degree from Leesville College, a Baptist school in Lexington County.

Adams joined the junior class at South Carolina College, (later called University of South Carolina) in 1896, soon after they began to accepting women. Although women were allowed to attend classes, they were not permitted to live on campus, being expected to board with local families or relatives in Columbia. In 1898, she graduated with a Bachelor of Arts degree, becoming the first women to earn a degree at the university. Which was very impressive. Later, she studied at Oxford University in England and Columbia University in New York earning a Master of Arts degree.

Adams married Lawson Battle Haynes, who was the president of Leesville College, in 1913. Sadly, she died on December 26, 1947, in Hendersonville, North Carolina. She is said to be remembered as a trailblazer in South Carolina higher education as well as an advocate for women's education.

== Teaching career ==
After finishing her studies, Adams began teaching. She spent eighteen years as the head of the Department of English at Meridian Community College in Meridian, Mississippi. Adams took a leave of absence from 1900 to 1903 in order to participate in activism. Mattie traveled across Europe to in 1909 and worked on articles during her travels and wrote these pieces of knowledge for the State newspaper for Columbia. She also taught for a total of 5 years at the Alabama State Teachers College in Livingston, Alabama. For her accomplishments, Meridian College awarded Adams an honorary doctorate in 1918.

== Activism ==
During her leave of absence in 1900, Adams worked as an organizer for the South Carolina Women's Christian Temperance Union (WCTU). The group was dedicated sharing information about temperance, suffrage, and social involvement. Adams traveled across South Carolina to organize local chapters, deliver speeches and promote moral and educational information to young women.

In 1909, Adams became a writer and traveled to Europe to tour England, France, and Italy. She wrote a series of travel letters published in The State newspaper of Columbia, South Carolina. Her letters consisted of her reflections of education, women's rights, and citizenship.
