= Bouknight =

Bouknight is a surname. Notable people with the surname include:

- James Bouknight (born 2000), American basketball player
- Kip Bouknight (born 1978), American baseball player

== See also ==
- Simon Bouknight House
