= Old Batesburg Grade School =

- U.S. National Register of Historic Places
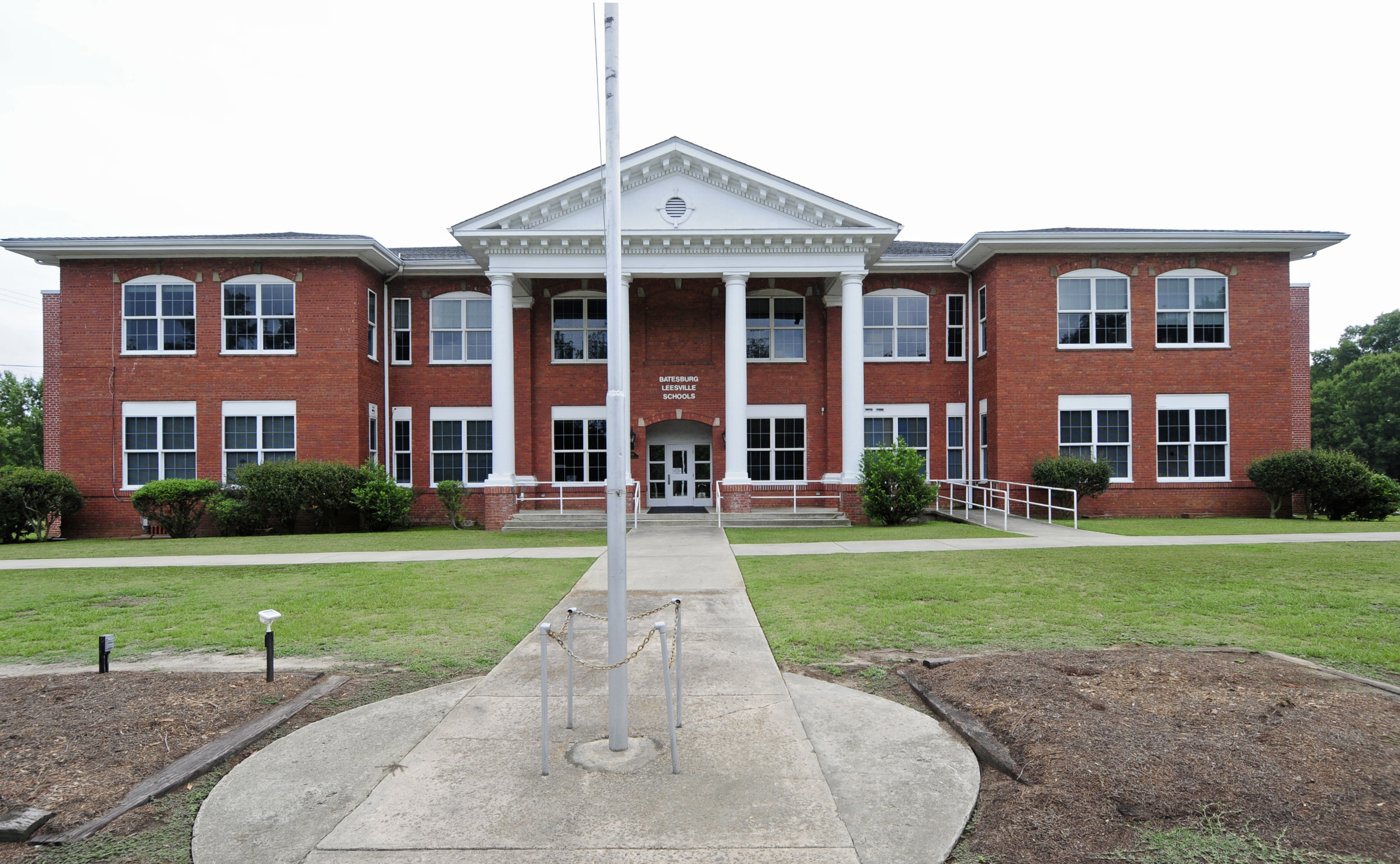
- Old Batesburg Grade School, August 2012

- Location within South Carolina Location within the United States
- Location: 338 W. Columbia Ave., Batesburg-Leesville, South Carolina
- Coordinates: 33°54′23″N 81°32′23″W
- Area: less than one acre
- Built: c. 1912, c. 1945
- Architectural style: Classical Revival
- MPS: Batesburg-Leesville MRA
- NRHP reference No.: 83002201
- Added to NRHP: May 27, 1983

Old Batesburg Grade School, also known as Batesburg Elementary School, is a historic elementary school building located at Batesburg-Leesville, Lexington County, South Carolina. It was built about 1912, and is a two-story, brick Neo-Classical school building with a central tetrastyle portico and flanking pavilions. The central portico has four colossal Tuscan order columns. An auditorium is located at the rear of the building. Wing additions were added about 1945. It was the town's first public school, housing grades 1–11.

It was listed on the National Register of Historic Places in 1983.

As of 2015, the building was used as the administrative offices of Lexington County School District Three.
