= Batesburg-Leesville, South Carolina =

- Town
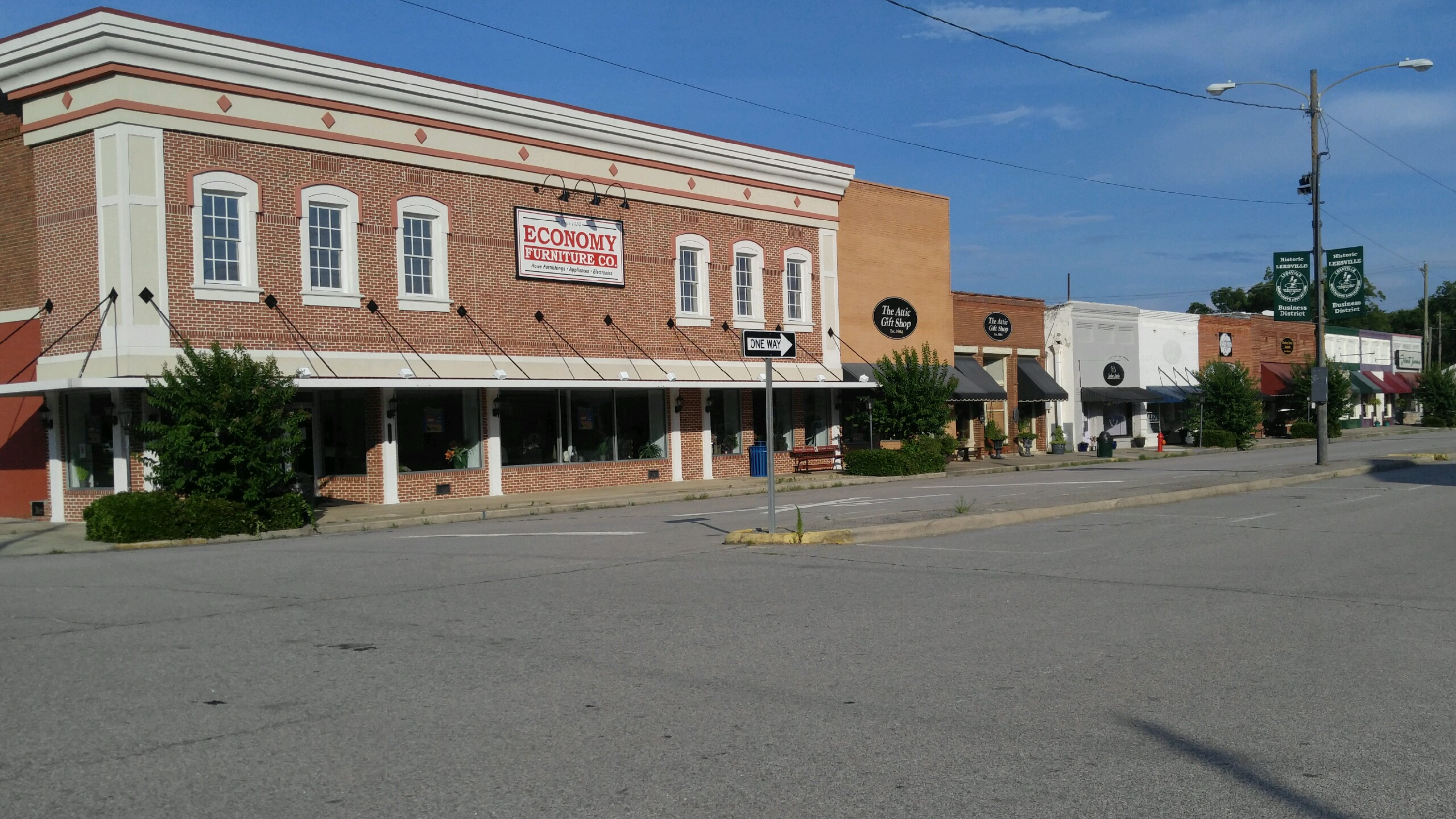
- Historic Leesville Business District - Main Street
- Nicknames: B-L, BB-LV, The Twin Cities
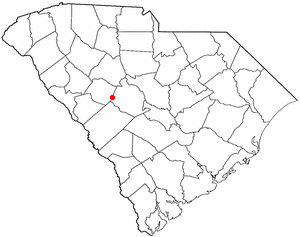
- Location of Batesburg-Leesville within South Carolina.
- Coordinates: 33°55′05″N 81°30′48″W
- Country: United States
- State: South Carolina
- Counties: Lexington, Saluda
- Incorperated: 1877 (Batesburg), 1875 (Leesville)
- Consolidated: 1991
- Named for: Cpt. Tom Bates, Col. John W. Lee

Government
  - Mayor David W. Bouknight Jr: Lancer Shull

Area
  - Total: 8.29 sq mi (21.48 km^{2})
  - Land: 8.20 sq mi (21.23 km^{2})
  - Water: 0.10 sq mi (0.26 km^{2})
- Elevation: 653 ft (199 m)

Population (2020)
  - Total: 5,270
  - Density: 643.0/sq mi (248.28/km^{2})
- Time zone: UTC−5 (EST)
  - Summer (DST): UTC−4 (EDT)
- ZIP codes: 29006 (Batesburg), 29070 (Leesville)
- Area codes: 803, 839
- FIPS code: 45-04300
- GNIS feature ID: 1253572
- Website: www.batesburg-leesville.org

Batesburg-Leesville is a town located primarily in Lexington County, South Carolina, United States, with a portion extending into Saluda County. The town was formed in 1992 by the consolidation of the towns of Batesburg and Leesville. Its population was 5,270 at the 2020 census with a majority living within Lexington County. Batesburg-Leesville is included within the Columbia metropolitan area.

== History ==
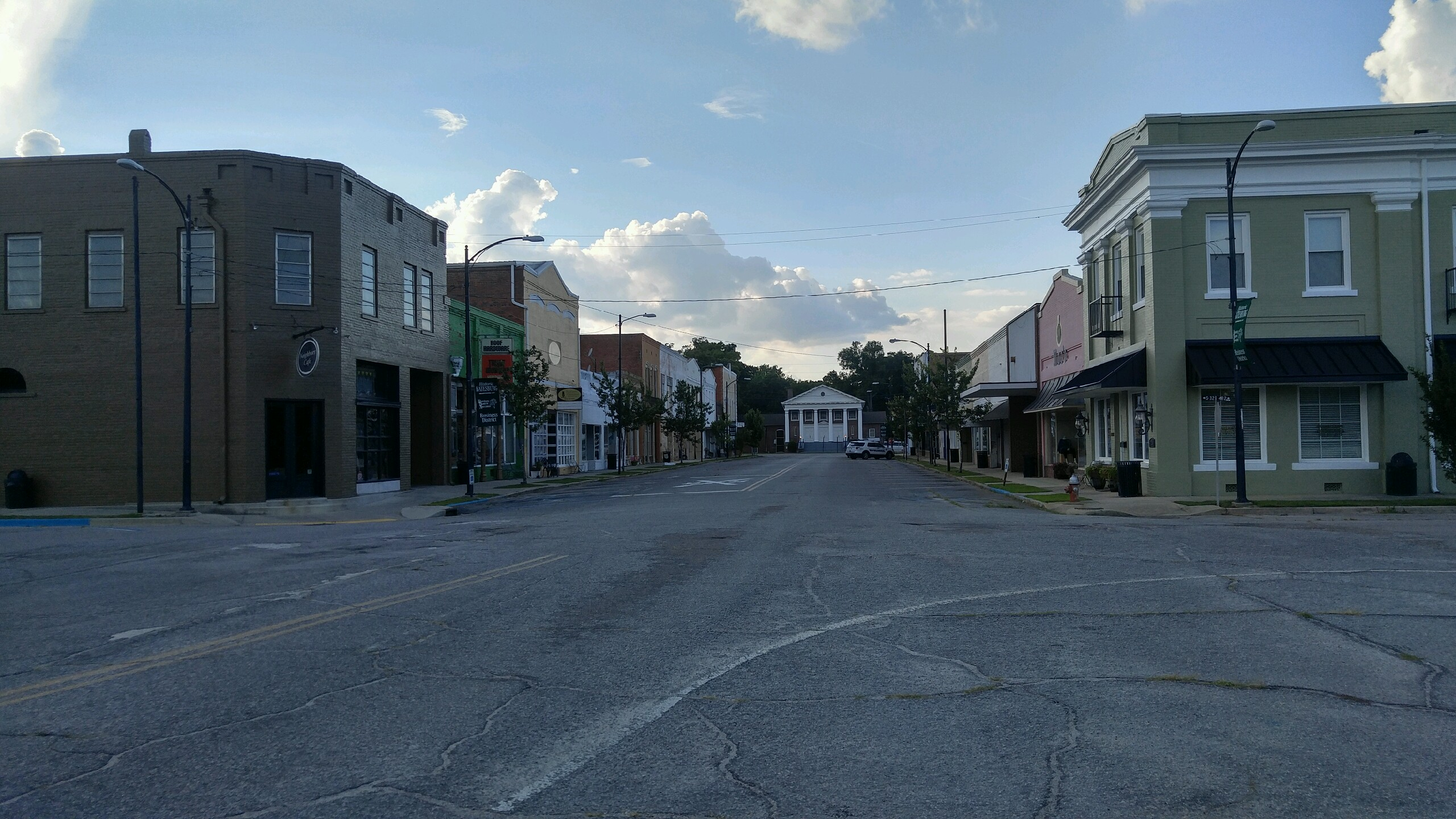
Historic Batesburg Business District - Oak Street

Leesville was incorporated on February 23, 1875, being settled predominantly by German Lutherans. The town was named for Colonel John W. Lee, a prominent resident of the community.

Batesburg was incorporated on May 31, 1877, being settled primarily by English Baptists. The town was named for Captain Tom Bates, a prominent citizen of the community and a captain in the American Civil War.

Both towns trace their initial growth to the Charlotte, Columbia and Augusta Railroad, which established a depot in both towns in 1869.

In 1992, the neighboring towns of Batesburg and Leesville consolidated into a single town named Batesburg-Leesville. The first mayor of Batesburg-Leesville, Dr. Elza S. "Sandy" Spradley, Jr., was also the last mayor of Batesburg. Spradley had been a practicing pharmacist and business owner in the town, a town council member, a member of the Batesburg Water Commission, a founding member of the community’s rescue squad, and an 18-year Fire Chief on the Batesburg Fire Department, retiring after 33 years.

=== Woodard incident ===
In February 1946 a black World War II veteran, Sergeant Isaac Woodard, was removed from a Greyhound bus in Batesburg after an argument with the driver. While still in uniform he was severely beaten by local police officers, including Sheriff Lynwood Shull, and permanently blinded. The attack became a cause celebre, becoming the subject of multiple radio commentaries by Orson Welles in July and August 1946, and the subject of Woody Guthrie's song, The Blinding of Isaac Woodard, though Aiken is mistakenly referenced as the location of the incident in the song.

Due to South Carolina's reluctance to pursue the case, President Harry S. Truman ordered a federal investigation. Shull was federally indicted and later acquitted by an all-white jury. This incident helped lead to Truman setting up the President's Committee on Civil Rights and issuing Executive Order 9981 desegregating the armed forces.

In early 2018, the town of Batesburg-Leesville, with Town Attorney Christian Spradley, Police Chief W. Wallace Oswald, and Mayor Lancer Shull (no relation to Linwood Shull), reopened the Woodard case to consider dismissing the 1946 charges. During a regular term of municipal court on June 5, 2018, Woodard's "drunk and disorderly" case was reopened and the conviction was vacated by Town Judge Robert Cook.

After a fundraising campaign, a permanent historic plaque now stands on the corner of West Church Street and Fulmer Street in old Batesburg commemorating the civil rights incident at the site of the original police station.

=== National Register of Historic Places ===
The following buildings in Batesburg-Leesville are listed on the National Register of Historic Places:

==== Batesburg ====
- Batesburg Commercial Historic District
- Simon Bouknight House
- Cartledge House
- Broadus Edwards House
- Hartley House
- J. B. Holman House
- A. C. Jones House
- McKendree Mitchell House
- Mitchell-Shealy House
- Old Batesburg Grade School
- John Jacob Rawl House
- Rawl-Couch House
- Southern Railway Depot

==== Leesville ====
- D. D. D. Barr House
- Cedar Grove Lutheran Church
- Church Street Historic District
- Hampton Hendrix Office
- Henry Franklin Hendrix House (de-listed in 2025)
- Thomas Galbraith Herbert House
- Leesville College Historic District
- Crowell Mitchell House
- Rev. Frank Yarborough House

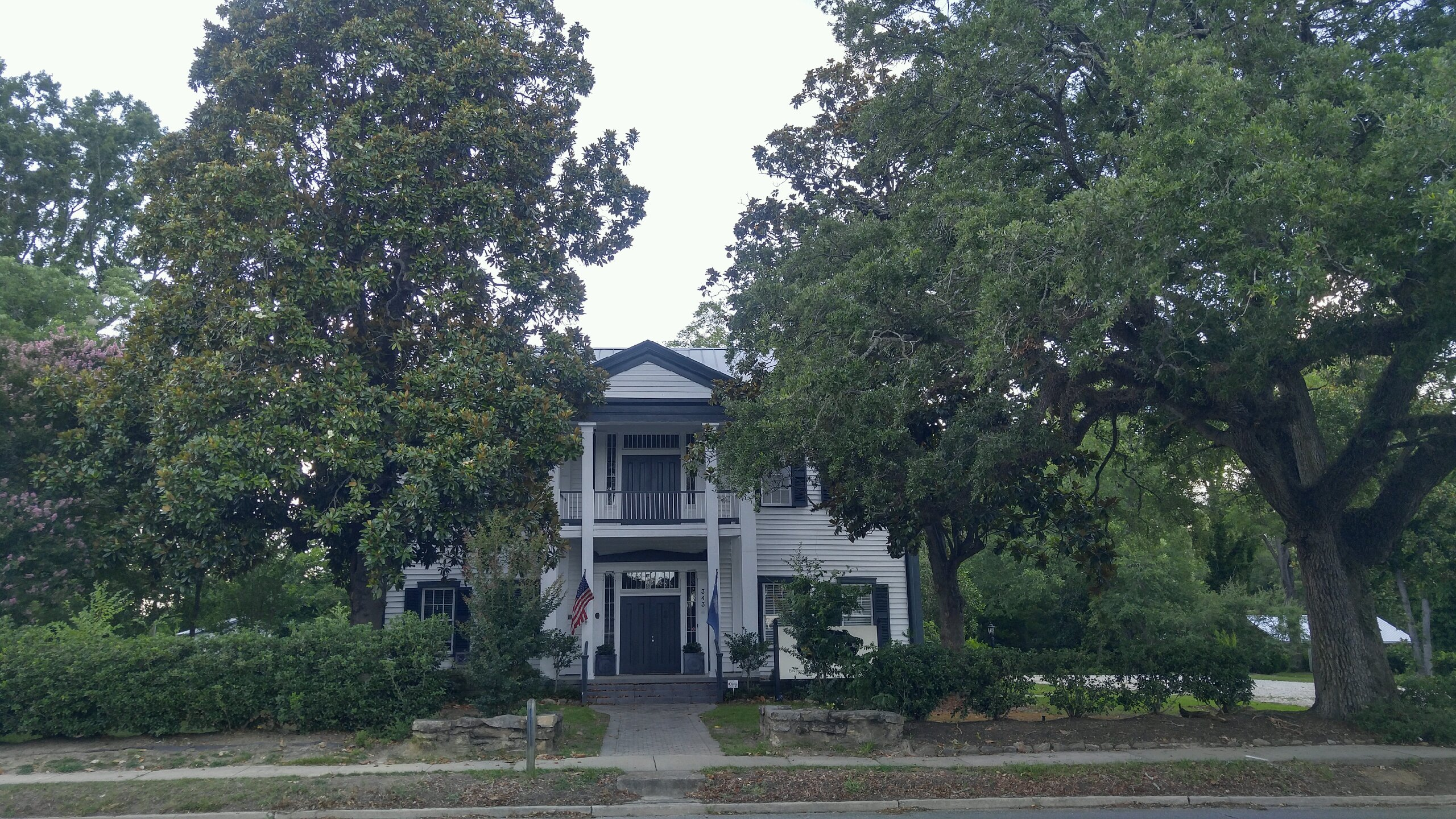
Hartley House (1830), located on U.S. Highway 1 across from the old Batesburg Graded School

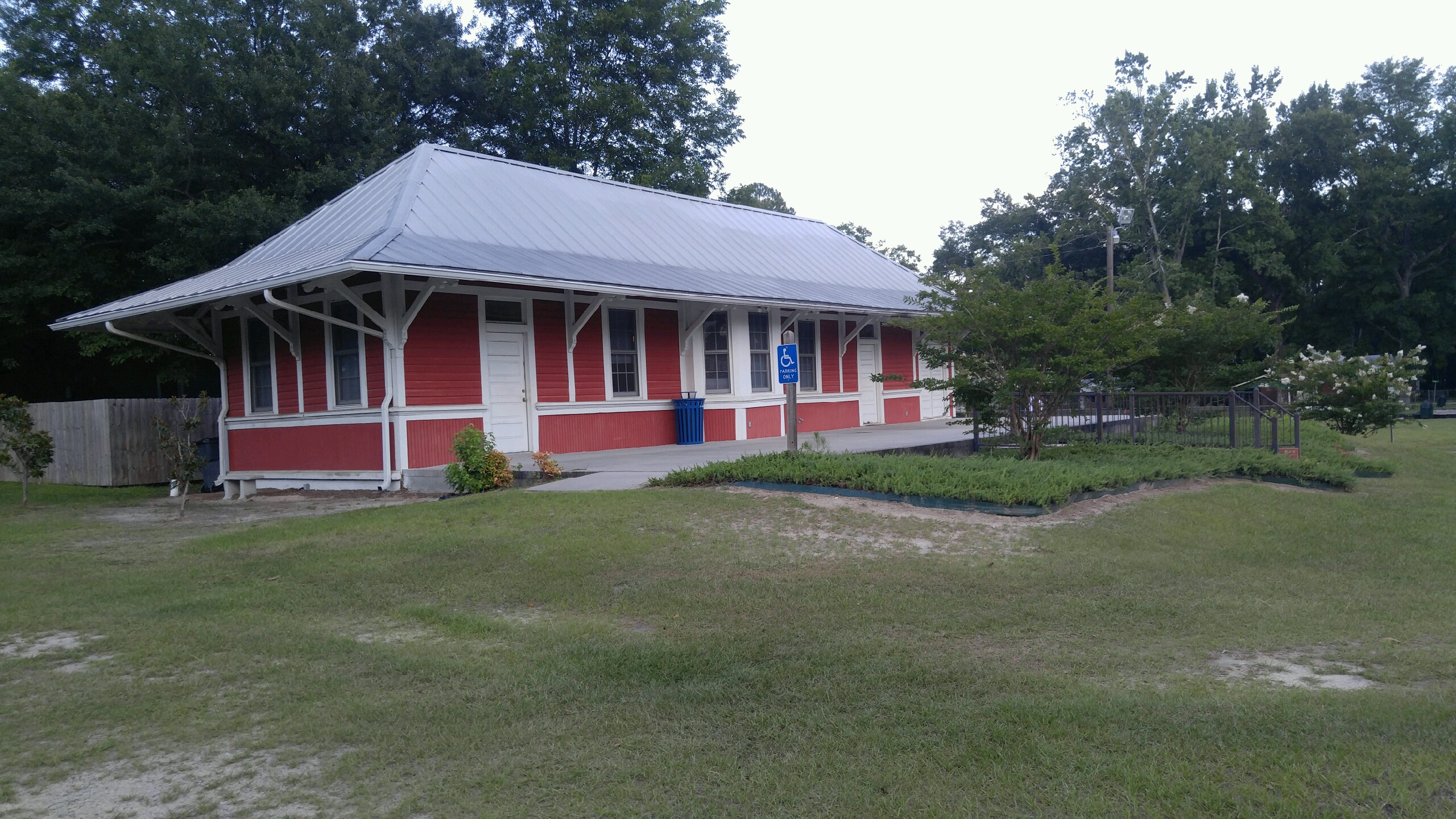
Batesburg's Southern Railway Depot (1900) now located in the Wilson Street Park

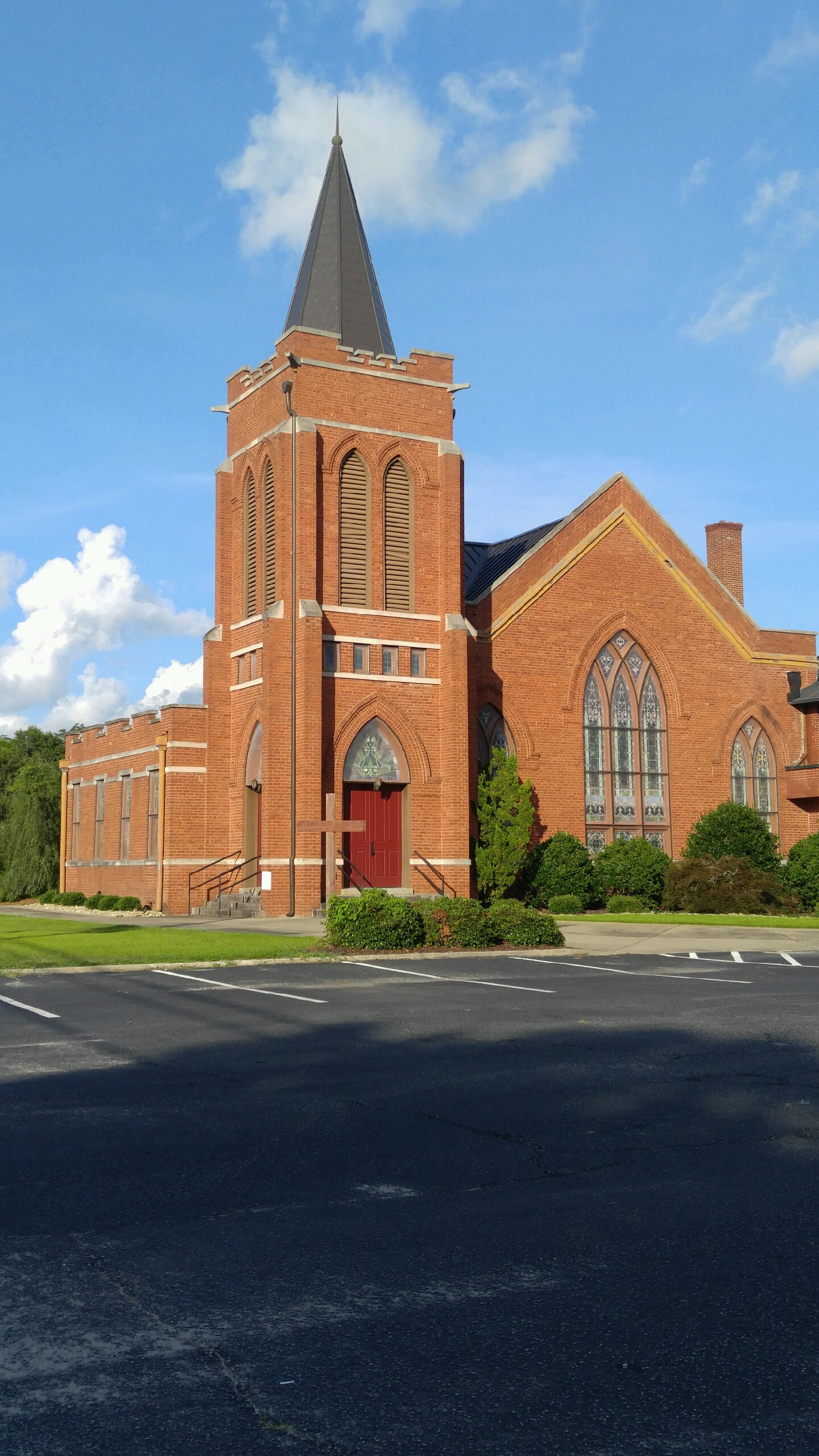
Leesville United Methodist Church (1909) on U.S. Highway 1

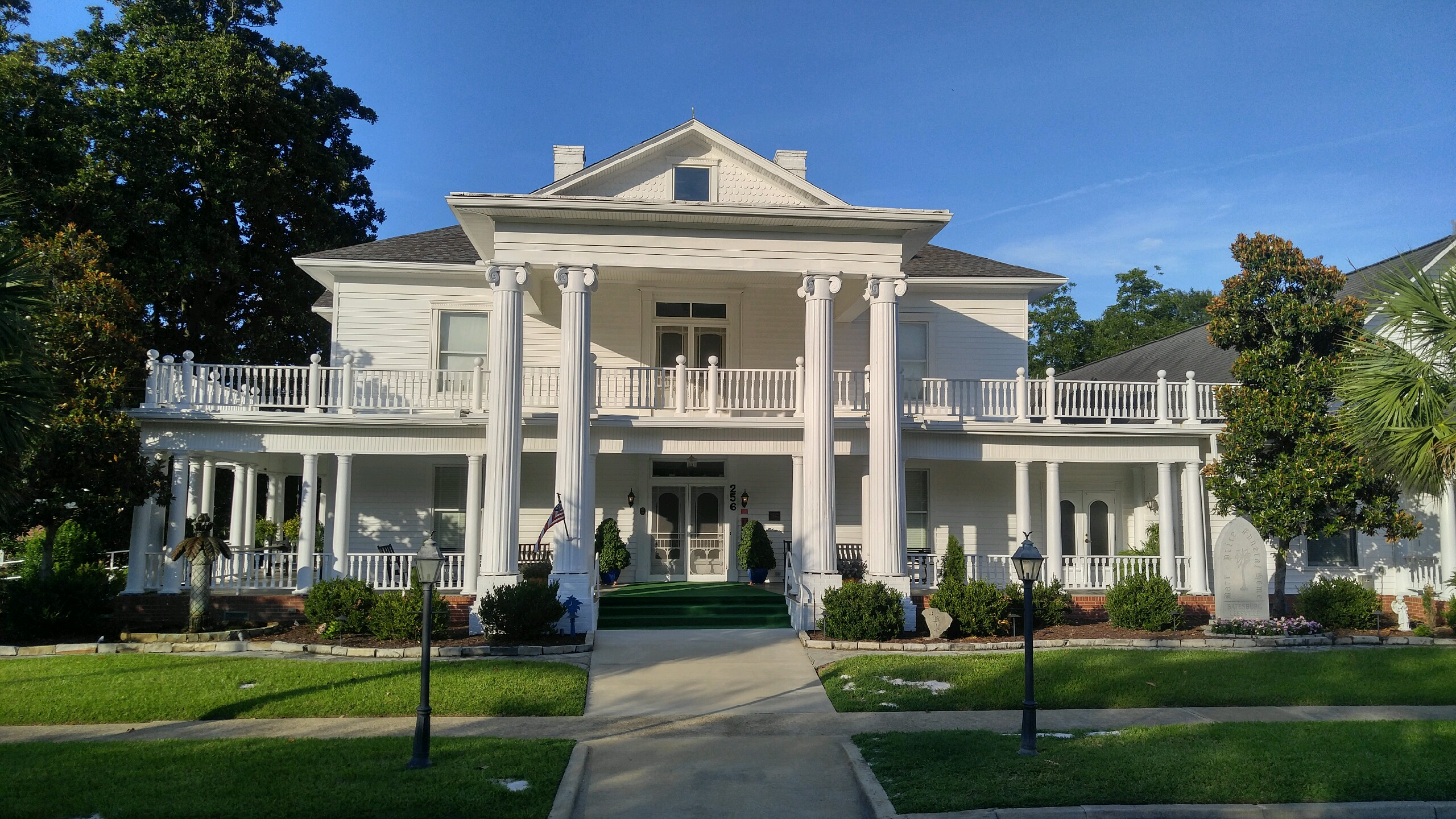
Barr-Price Funeral Home (1909) - Part of the Leesville College Historic District

== Law and government ==
Batesburg-Leesville is served by a council-manager style government. The town employs approximate 60 full-time employees, and 35 volunteer firefighters. The town operated from a $7.4 million budget in Fiscal Year 2018–2019.

As Batesburg-Leesville was formed by the consolidation of two towns, both former towns have their own postal codes. While the United States Postal Service prefers "Batesburg" for 29006 and "Leesville" for 29070, "Batesburg Leesville" is considered acceptable for both codes.

=== Mayor ===
Batesburg-Leesville's mayor is David W. Bouknight Jr.

=== Town council ===
The town council comprises eight elected council persons representing single-member districts. The current council members are:

- District 1: Bo Turner
- District 2: Chip Spradley
- District 3: Steve Cain
- District 4: Betty Hartley
- District 5: Cathi Knox
- District 6: Paul Wise
- District 7: Joseph "Joe" Montgomery
- District 8: Bob Hall

=== Administration ===
William Theodore "Ted" Luckadoo is the town manager and oversees the day-to-day administrative functions of the town. Luckadoo was named the third town manager of consolidated Batesburg-Leesville in 2014. Jason "Jay" Hendrix was named the assistant town manager on August 8, 2019.

=== Fire department ===
The Batesburg-Leesville Fire Department consists of two stations, five career staff members and 41 volunteer firefighters as of September 2019. The two stations are located in the town's two historic business districts and are still identified as the Batesburg station and the Leesville station. The department boasts an Insurance Services Office Class 3/3B rating.

== Economy ==
=== Top employers ===
The top employer in Batesburg-Leesville is Lexington County School District Three with four different schools and a district office. The next is Ansaldo STS, which has a 184,000 sq ft (17,100 m^{2}) manufacturing facility.

=== Poultry industry ===
The town's economic dependence on poultry harvesting is apparent due to the presence of two large processing plants: Amick Farms and Columbia Farms. These assist in making Lexington County the top poultry producer in the state.

=== Poultry festival ===
The South Carolina Poultry Festival (formerly the Ridge Poultry Festival) has been held on the second Saturday in May since 1987. The festival features live music, food vendors, craft vendors, a carnival, a parade, and to conclude the event a cake auction and fireworks show.

== Education ==
=== Public schools ===
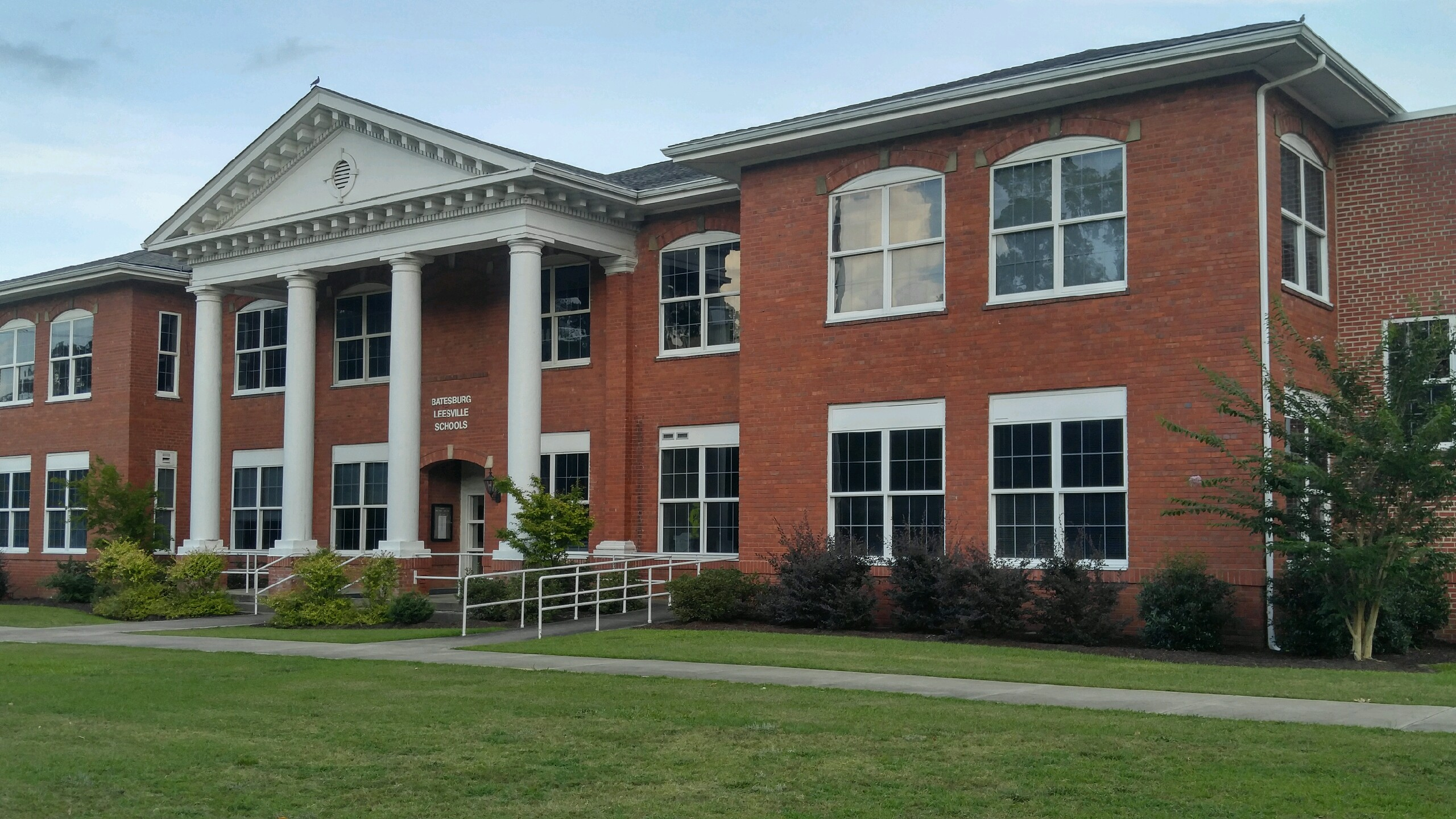
Former Batesburg Graded School (1912) on U.S. Highway 1

The public school system in all parts of Batesburg-Leesville census-designated place is administered by Lexington County School District Three, which consists of:

- Batesburg-Leesville Primary School (grades K-2)
- Batesburg-Leesville Elementary School (grades 3–5)
- Batesburg-Leesville Middle School (grades 6–8)
- Batesburg-Leesville High School (grades 9–12)

All sports teams associated with School District Three use a panther as their mascot. The Panthers' colors are purple, gold, and white

=== Historic public schools ===
The Batesburg-Leesville Primary School opened in 1984. At that time the district began operating just four schools, as they consolidated smaller, older schools into the new school. Historical schools which closed in 1984 included Hampton Elementary School (1954), Utopia Elementary School (1953), Leesville Elementary School and Batesburg Primary School.

The Batesburg-Leesville Elementary School opened 1996 and replaced the Old Batesburg Grade School which had served the fourth and fifth grades and now serves as the Lexington School District Three Administrative Office. The new school allowed third grade to be shifted from the B-L Primary School to the new Elementary School give the current school breakdown by grade.

The Batesburg-Leesville Middle School opened in 1999. This led to the closing of the old middle school campus which had originally been built as Batesburg-Leesville High School in 1921 with numerous additions through the years.

The Batesburg-Leesville High School opened in 1975. The new school was built on the former Summerland College campus on Summerland Avenue. The construction of a new school had been spurred by integration and student population increases. With integration a former building of Summerland College was used as a middle school in the early 1970s but a fire heavily damaged the building and eventually sped up the construction of the new high school. The first class to graduate in Panther Stadium was the class of 1976.

Prior to racial integration statewide, the local African-American students attended Twin-City High School and Hampton School. Twin-City High School was located on Maple Street in Batesburg where the Twin-City High School Park is now located. The park is owned by the Twin-City Alumni Association. The original two-story wooden Hampton School (1922) was replaced in 1954 by a single-story brick structure on South Lee Street in Leesville. The original wooden building was subsequently torn down, but a marker remains under a large tree in the parking lot of Friendship Baptist Church on South Lee Street. Other "colored" schools included Leesville Colored Primary School and Batesburg-Saluda Colored School.

There were other older schools which had closed previously to include Delmar School which was located a few miles outside of town. View the Delmar School historical marker at. More photographs of these old school buildings may be seen at SC School Insurance Photos 1935-50.

=== Private schools ===
W. Wyman King Academy and the Ridge Christian School are private, nondenominational Christian schools accepting students in grades K-12.

=== Colleges and universities ===
In 2008, Midlands Technical College opened a new Batesburg-Leesville satellite campus in the Leesville Historic District. The campus is within the boundaries of the Leesville College Park at the intersection of Main Street and College Street.

=== Historic colleges ===
Leesville College Park and old classroom building, summer 2018

- Leesville College, 1890–1911, originally called the Leesville English and Classical Institute (1881–1890). The Haynes Auditorium (built 1883) in the Leesville College Historic District at the intersection of Main Street and College Street was the original classroom building. Two neighboring houses were the college President's House and Dormitory. The two homes were a single building during the college days and known as Salisto Hall (a modifier combining the name of two neighboring rivers, Saluda and Edisto). The school was said to have been the first in the state to include practical and technical training in its curriculum, to have a girls' basketball team, to teach tennis and to teach higher mathematics to females. A.B. degrees were granted after four years of Latin, two years of French or German, mathematics, natural science, history, English, philosophy, and Greek. A Master's Degree was offered for a year of post-graduate work. There were departments of music, arts, commercial law, bookkeeping, typing, and one devoted to the Pitman system of shorthand.
- Summerland College, 1912–30. Originally known as Summerland Resort, this property was converted to an all-female college of the Lutheran Church in 1912. It was located on the site of the current Batesburg-Leesville High School. It was closed after the 1930 school year and then consolidated with the all-male Newberry College.

=== Library ===
Batesburg-Leesville has a public library, a branch of the Lexington County Public Library.

== Media ==
=== Newspapers ===
Batesburg-Leesville is served weekly by The Twin-City News, which specifically focuses on local news, as well as that from immediately surrounding areas (mostly Gilbert and Monetta). It minimizes national or world news. The Twin-City News was established in 1925 and is Batesburg-Leesville's 2nd oldest continuously operating business (the oldest being Barr-Price Funeral Home established at Barr Funeral Home in 1890).

The town is also served by The State newspaper, which circulates amid most of the state.

In 2007, Lexington County Chronicle and The Dispatch-News began appearing at town stores and business to complement their subscribers in the area. This newspaper covers all county governments, state, national, and international news, to the extent such news concerns Lexington County residents.

=== Radio ===
Batesburg-Leesville has only one radio station transmitting from within its borders, WBLR 1430 AM. However, Batesburg-Leesville is in range of several radio stations broadcasting from the surrounding areas, including:

- WBLR 1430 AM - Spanish Christian - Batesburg-Leesville, SC (simulcast on 103.3 FM Batesburg-Leesville, SC)
- WYFV 88.7 FM - Christian - Cayce, SC
- WMHK 89.7 FM - Christian - Columbia, SC
- WUSC 90.5 FM - University of South Carolina - Columbia, SC
- WLTR 91.3 FM - Classical/NPR - Columbia, SC
- WLFW 92.7 FM - Southern Gospel - Johnston, SC
- WZMJ 93.1 FM - All-Time Favorites - Lexington, SC
- WARQ 93.5 FM - New Rock - Columbia, SC
- WUDE 94.3 FM - Country - Columbia, SC
- WLTY 96.7 FM - Variety - Columbia, SC
- WCOS 97.5 FM - Country - Columbia, SC
- WLXC 98.5 FM - R&B/Soul - Lexington, SC
- WWDM 101.3 FM - R&B/Soul - Columbia, SC
- WBBQ 104.3 FM - "Top 40" - Augusta, GA
- WNOK 104.7 FM - "Top 40" - Columbia, SC
- WEKL 105.7 FM - Classic rock - Augusta, GA
- WTCB 106.7 FM - "Top 40" - Columbia, SC
- WNKT 107.5 FM - Sports Talk - Columbia, SC

=== Television ===
Over-the-air channels receivable in Batesburg-Leesville include:

- WJBF - Channel 6 - Augusta, GA
- WRDW-TV - Channel 12 - Augusta, GA
- WOLO-TV - Channel 25 (ABC Affiliate) - Columbia, SC
- WFXG - Channel 54 - Augusta, GA
- WLTX - Channel 19 (CBS Affiliate) - Columbia, SC
- WACH - Channel 57 (Fox Affiliate) - Columbia, SC
- WIS-TV - Channel 10 (NBC Affiliate) - Columbia, SC
- WRLK-TV - Channel 35 - Columbia, SC

Alternatively, digital cable providers Time Warner Cable and Pond Branch Telecommunications collectively cover the majority of the greater Batesburg-Leesville area.

== Geography ==
Batesburg-Leesville is located in western Lexington County. A small portion of the town extends west into Saluda County.

According to the United States Census Bureau, the town has a total area of 8.3 sq mi (21.5 km^{2}), of which 0.1 sq mi (0.3 km^{2}), or 1.19%, are covered by water.

Batesburg-Leesville is located along the Atlantic Seaboard Fall Line which separates the Piedmont region from the Atlantic coastal plain. Historically, U.S. Route 1 followed this line, and it presently separates the north and south sides of the duel town. Typically in this vicinity, the Piedmont area has a clay soil surface, while the Coastal Plain is sandy.

=== Climate ===
According to the Köppen Climate Classification system, Batesburg has a humid subtropical climate, abbreviated "Cfa" on climate maps. The hottest temperature recorded in Batesburg was 107 °F (41.7 °C) on July 3, 1897, while the coldest temperature recorded was −4 °F (−20.0 °C) on February 14, 1899.

Climate data for Batesburg, South Carolina, 1991–2020 normals, extremes 1894–1922, 2007–present
Month	Jan	Feb	Mar	Apr	May	Jun	Jul	Aug	Sep	Oct	Nov	Dec	Year
Record high °F (°C)	79 (26)	94 (34)	92 (33)	96 (36)	102 (39)	106 (41)	107 (42)	105 (41)	100 (38)	99 (37)	86 (30)	84 (29)	107 (42)
Mean daily maximum °F (°C)	54.7 (12.6)	58.5 (14.7)	66.0 (18.9)	73.9 (23.3)	81.0 (27.2)	87.5 (30.8)	90.5 (32.5)	89.2 (31.8)	83.9 (28.8)	74.4 (23.6)	64.3 (17.9)	57.2 (14.0)	73.4 (23.0)
Daily mean °F (°C)	44.8 (7.1)	47.6 (8.7)	54.2 (12.3)	62.4 (16.9)	70.4 (21.3)	77.6 (25.3)	80.6 (27.0)	79.5 (26.4)	74.3 (23.5)	64.0 (17.8)	53.7 (12.1)	47.4 (8.6)	63.0 (17.3)
Mean daily minimum °F (°C)	34.9 (1.6)	36.7 (2.6)	42.3 (5.7)	50.8 (10.4)	59.8 (15.4)	67.6 (19.8)	70.6 (21.4)	69.8 (21.0)	64.6 (18.1)	53.5 (11.9)	43.0 (6.1)	37.5 (3.1)	52.6 (11.4)
Record low °F (°C)	9 (−13)	−4 (−20)	17 (−8)	26 (−3)	36 (2)	46 (8)	55 (13)	52 (11)	43 (6)	27 (−3)	19 (−7)	6 (−14)	−4 (−20)
Average precipitation inches (mm)	3.96 (101)	3.79 (96)	4.29 (109)	3.35 (85)	3.02 (77)	5.26 (134)	4.16 (106)	4.71 (120)	4.05 (103)	2.84 (72)	3.26 (83)	4.24 (108)	46.93 (1,194)
Average snowfall inches (cm)	0.9 (2.3)	0.0 (0.0)	0.0 (0.0)	0.0 (0.0)	0.0 (0.0)	0.0 (0.0)	0.0 (0.0)	0.0 (0.0)	0.0 (0.0)	0.0 (0.0)	0.2 (0.51)	0.0 (0.0)	1.1 (2.81)
Average precipitation days (≥ 0.01 in)	8.7	8.0	7.7	7.0	6.8	8.8	9.5	8.7	6.6	6.1	6.9	8.8	93.6
Average snowy days (≥ 0.1 in)	0.2	0.0	0.0	0.0	0.0	0.0	0.0	0.0	0.0	0.0	0.0	0.0	0.2
Source 1: NOAA
Source 2: National Weather Service

== Demographics ==
Historical population
Census	Pop.	Note	%±
1880	286		—
1890	528		84.6%
1900	971		83.9%
1910	1,995		105.5%
1920	2,848		42.8%
1930	2,839		−0.3%
1940	2,933		3.3%
1950	3,169		8.0%
1960	3,806		20.1%
1970	4,036		6.0%
1980	4,023		−0.3%
1990	4,082		1.5%
2000	5,517		35.2%
2010	5,362		−2.8%
2020	5,270		−1.7%
2025 (est.)	5,346	▲	1.4%
U.S. Decennial Census

=== 2020 census ===
Batesburg-Leesville racial composition
Race	Num.	Perc.
White (non-Hispanic)	2,575	48.86%
Black or African American (non-Hispanic)	2,191	41.57%
Native American	10	0.19%
Asian	31	0.59%
Pacific Islander	4	0.08%
Other/Mixed	148	2.81%
Hispanic or Latino	311	5.9%

As of the 2020 United States census, there were 5,270 people, 2,046 households, and 1,458 families residing in the town.

As of 2023, of the 5,270 people, about 4,830 live in Lexington County and 440 live in Saluda County.

=== 2010 census ===
The town's population was 5,362 as of the 2010 census and an estimated 5,415 in 2019.

=== 2000 census ===
As of the U.S. Census of 2000, there were 5,517 people, 2,167 households, and 1,482 families residing in the town. The population density was 751.4 inhabitants per square mile (290.1/km^{2}). There were 2,446 housing units at an average density of 333.2 units per square mile (128.6 units/km^{2}).

The racial makeup of the town was 52.82% White, 45.66% African American, 0.29% Native American, 0.20% Asian, 0.40% from other races, and 0.63% from two or more races. Hispanic or Latino of any race were 1.61% of the local population.

There were 2,167 households, of which 31.2% had children under the age of 18 living with them, 42.0% were married couples living together, 22.2% had a female householder with no husband present, and 31.6% were non-families. 28.3% of all households were made up of individuals, and 13.7% had someone living alone who was 65 years of age or older. The average household size was 2.50, and the average family size was 3.03.

In the town, the population was spread out, with 26.5% under the age of 18, 8.4% from 18 to 24, 25.2% from 25 to 44, 22.6% from 45 to 64, and 17.3% who were 65 years of age or older. The median age was 38 years. For every 100 females, there were 83.3 males. For every 100 females age 18 and over, there were 76.5 males.

The median income for a household in the town was $32,865, and the median income for a family was $40,040. Males had a median income of $32,447 versus $22,196 for females. The per capita income for the town was $16,078. About 16.1% of families and 18.0% of the population were below the poverty line, including 25.9% of those under age 18 and 12.5% of those age 65 or over.

== Notable people ==
Notable figures who were born in, lived in, or are otherwise associated with Batesburg-Leesville include:

=== Athletes ===
- Zackary Bowman, a professional football player for three teams
- Dontrelle Inman, a professional football player for three teams
- Ed McDaniel, a former professional football player from 1992 to 2001
- Shaq Roland, a wide receiver for South Carolina Gamecocks
- Maurice Simpkins, a professional football player
- Dal Shealy, college football player and coach

=== Musicians ===
- Linda Martell, an American rhythm and blues and country music singer.

=== Governmental and Military ===
- Katrina F. Shealy, Republican state senator from 2013 to 2025
- Ryan C. Shealy, Democratic state senator from 1980 to 1992
- George Bell Timmerman Jr., Governor of South Carolina from 1955 to 1959
