= Lexington County School District Three =

School district in South Carolina, United States

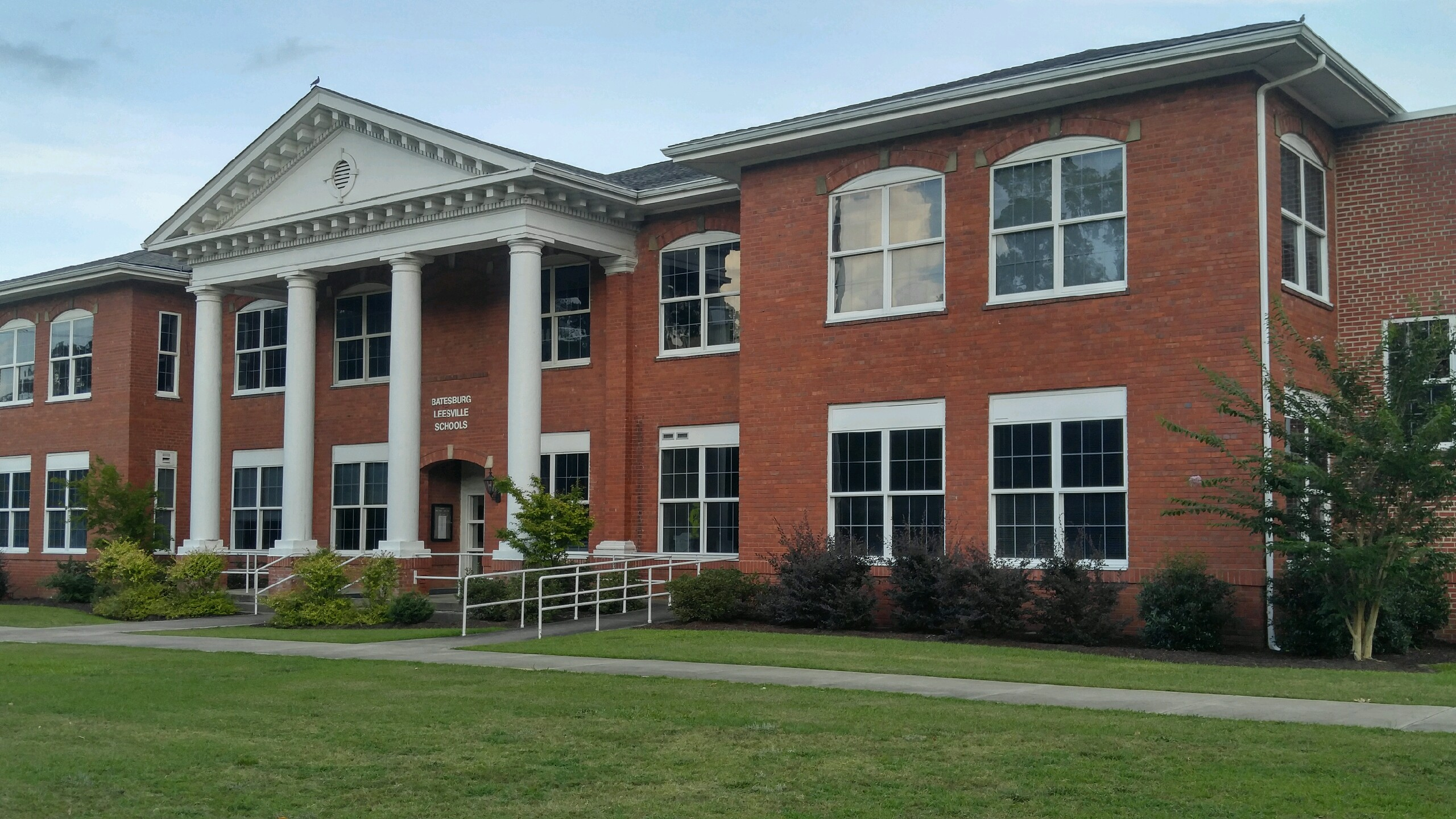
- Administration office of the school district

Address
- 338 West Columbia Avenue Batesburg-Leesville, South Carolina, 29006; United States

District information
- Type: Public
- Grades: PreK–12
- NCES District ID: 4502760

Students and staff
- Students: 2,020
- Teachers: 160.0
- Staff: 197.8
- Student–teacher ratio: 12.62

Other information
- Website: www.lex3.org

Lexington County School District Three (LCSD3), also known as Batesburg-Leesville Schools, is a school district headquartered in Batesburg-Leesville, South Carolina.

It occupies parts of Lexington County and parts of Saluda County.

It operates four schools: Batesburg-Leesville Primary School, Batesburg-Leesville Elementary School, Batesburg-Leesville Middle School, and Batesburg-Leesville High School. It also operates the First Steps and Lifelong Learning Centers as well as a Fine Arts Center.
