= Batesburg Commercial Historic District =

Historic district in South Carolina, United States

- U.S. National Register of Historic Places
- U.S. Historic district
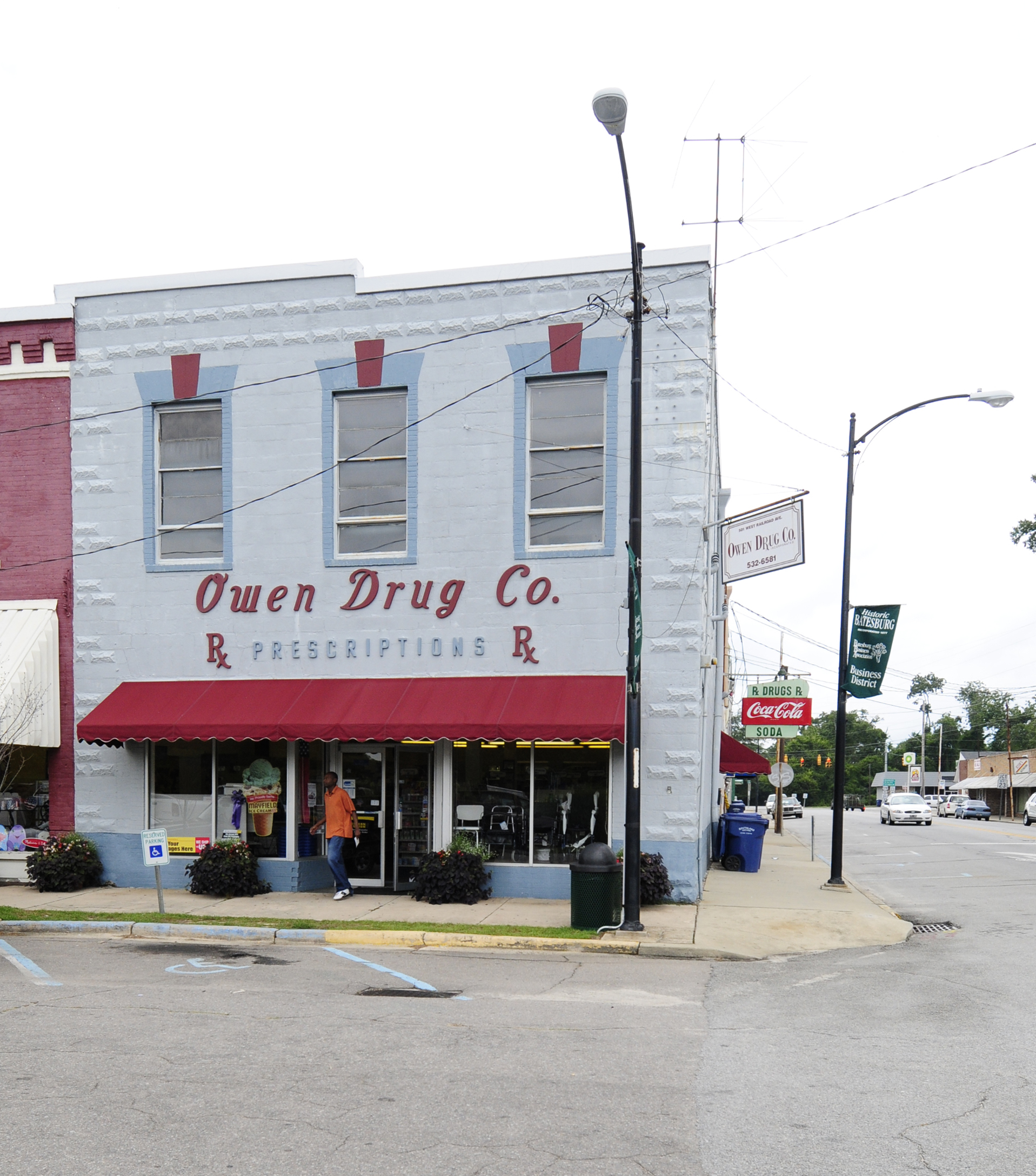
- Batesburg Commercial Historic District, August 2012

- Location within South Carolina Location within the United States
- Location: Granite, Oak, Pine, Church Sts., Rutland and N. Railroad Aves., Batesburg-Leesville, South Carolina
- Coordinates: 33°54′25″N 81°32′54″W
- Area: 5.4 acres (2.2 ha)
- Architect: Multiple
- Architectural style: Classical Revival, Italianate
- MPS: Batesburg-Leesville MRA
- NRHP reference No.: 82003875
- Added to NRHP: July 6, 1982

Batesburg Commercial Historic District is a national historic district located at Batesburg-Leesville, Lexington County, South Carolina. It encompasses 28 contributing buildings in the central business district of Batesburg. It largely consists of brick commercial buildings built between 1895 and 1925, with the majority dating from 1900 to 1910. Notable buildings include the Old Telephone Company, M. Howard Butcher Shop, Owen Drug Company, Bank of Western Carolina, Old First National Bank, Belk's, and the M. E. Rutland Building.

It was listed on the National Register of Historic Places in 1982.
