= Henry Franklin Hendrix House =

Historic house in South Carolina, United States

- Formerly listed on the U.S. National Register of Historic Places
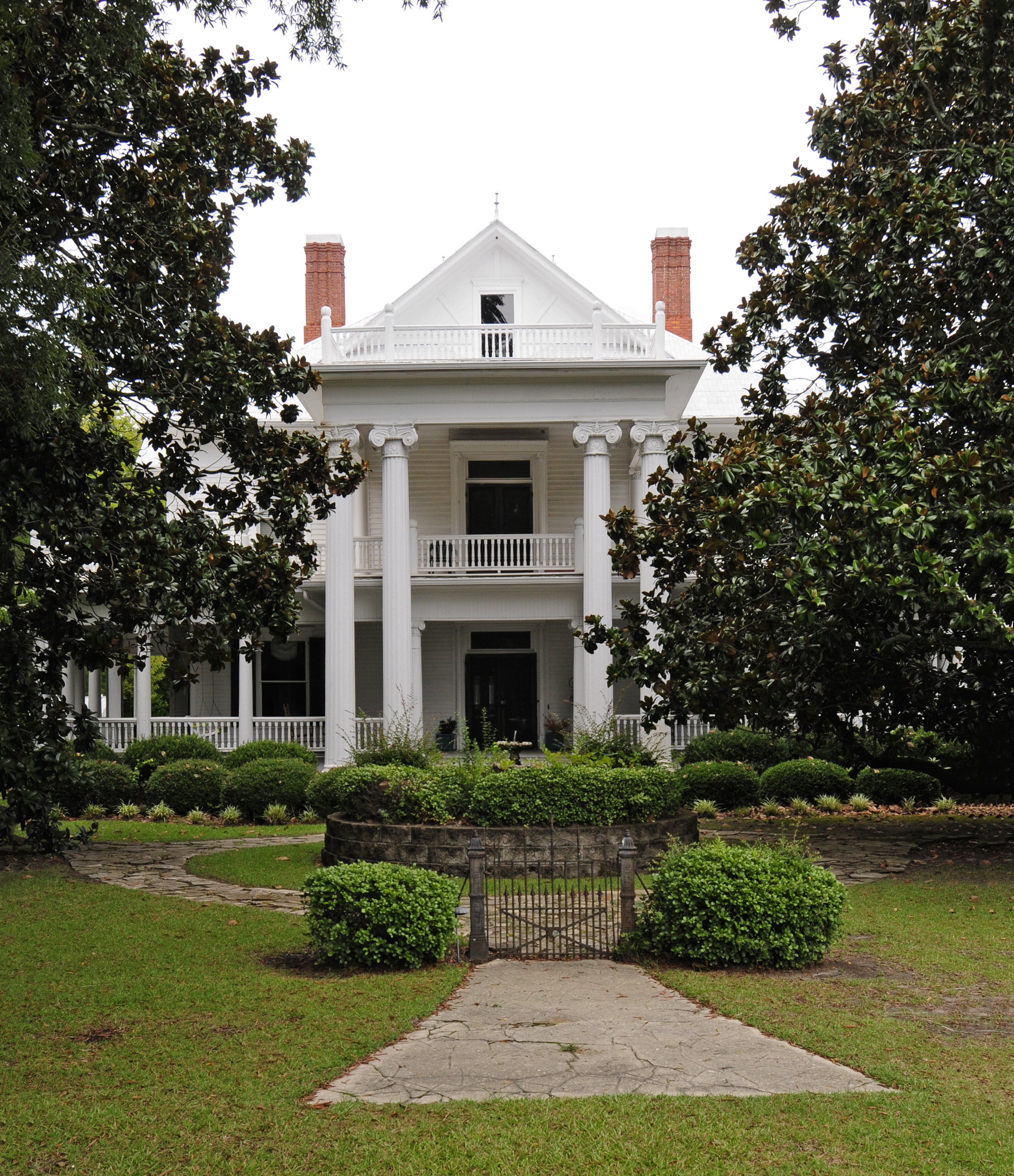
- Henry Franklin Hendrix Home, August 2012

- Location within South Carolina Location within the United States
- Location: Hendrix Heights Plantation, Batesburg-Leesville, South Carolina
- Coordinates: 33°54′56″N 81°31′33″W
- Area: 1.4 acres (0.57 ha)
- Built: 1888, 1907
- Built by: Mitchell, J.A.J.
- Architectural style: Classical Revival
- Demolished: 2016
- MPS: Batesburg-Leesville MRA
- NRHP reference No.: 82003886

Significant dates
- Added to NRHP: July 6, 1982
- Removed from NRHP: August 1, 2025

Henry Franklin Hendrix House, also known as the Frank Hendrix House, was a historic home located at Batesburg-Leesville, Lexington County, South Carolina. It was originally built in 1888, and remodeled in 1907 in the Classical Revival style. It was demolished September 2016 by Frank Cason Development to build a Taco Bell despite public outcry. It was a two-story, weatherboard residence with a pressed shingle metal roof and a brick foundation. The front facade featured a central projecting portico supported by four colossal Ionic order columns.

It was listed on the National Register of Historic Places in 1982, and was delisted in 2025.
