= A. C. Jones House =

Historic house in South Carolina, United States

- U.S. National Register of Historic Places
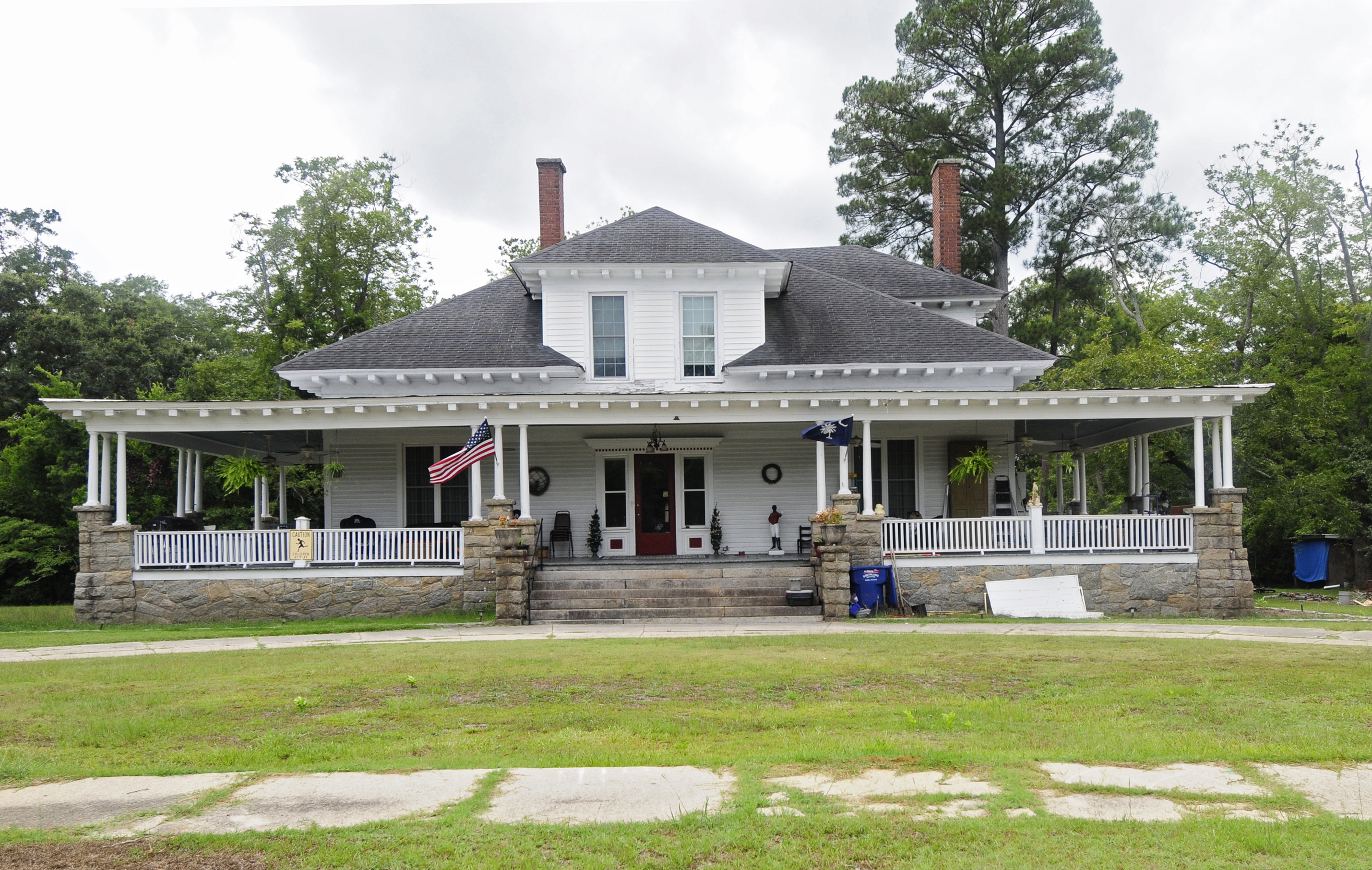
- A. C. Jones House, August 2012

- Location within South Carolina Location within the United States
- Location: 104 Fair Ave., Batesburg-Leesville, South Carolina
- Coordinates: 33°54′22″N 81°32′33″W
- Area: 1.4 acres (0.57 ha)
- Built by: Jones, A.C.
- Architectural style: California Bungalow
- MPS: Batesburg-Leesville MRA
- NRHP reference No.: 82003880
- Added to NRHP: July 6, 1982

A. C. Jones House is a historic home located at Batesburg-Leesville, Lexington County, South Carolina. It was built in 1904, and is a California bungalow form influenced weatherboard residence. The hipped roof has three large, hipped dormers. The dormers, roof, and projecting wraparound porch have exposed rafters. The house and porch sit on a granite foundation.

It was listed on the National Register of Historic Places in 1982.
