= Hampton Hendrix Office =

- U.S. National Register of Historic Places
- Location within South Carolina Location within the United States
- Location: Leesville Ave., Batesburg-Leesville, South Carolina
- Coordinates: 33°55′5″N 81°30′50″W
- Area: 0.1 acres (0.040 ha)
- Built: c. 1897
- Architectural style: Late Victorian
- MPS: Batesburg-Leesville MRA
- NRHP reference No.: 82003885
- Added to NRHP: July 6, 1982

Hampton Hendrix Office is a historic home office building located at Batesburg-Leesville, Lexington County, South Carolina. It was built about 1897, and is a one-story, decorated Victorian rectangular weatherboard building. It measures approximately 3 metres by 5.49 metres (or 10 by 18 feet), and has a gabled metal roof and highly decorative façade. The building is set on a lattice brick curtain wall.

It was listed on the National Register of Historic Places in 1982.
