= Crowell Mitchell House =

Historic house in South Carolina, United States

- U.S. National Register of Historic Places
- Location within South Carolina Location within the United States
- Location: Church St., Batesburg-Leesville, South Carolina
- Coordinates: 33°55′2″N 81°30′40″W
- Area: less than one acre
- Built: c. 1885
- Architectural style: Late Victorian
- MPS: Batesburg-Leesville MRA
- NRHP reference No.: 82003890
- Added to NRHP: July 6, 1982

Crowell Mitchell House is a historic home located at Batesburg-Leesville, Lexington County, South Carolina. It was built in the 1880s and is a two-story, frame Victorian dwelling. The front facade features ornamental double-tiered porches which connect flanking bays. It is representative of a typical middle-class residence with spacious simple rooms, large window area, and scrollwork balustrades.

It was listed on the National Register of Historic Places in 1982.
