= Cartledge House =

Historic house in South Carolina, United States

- U.S. National Register of Historic Places
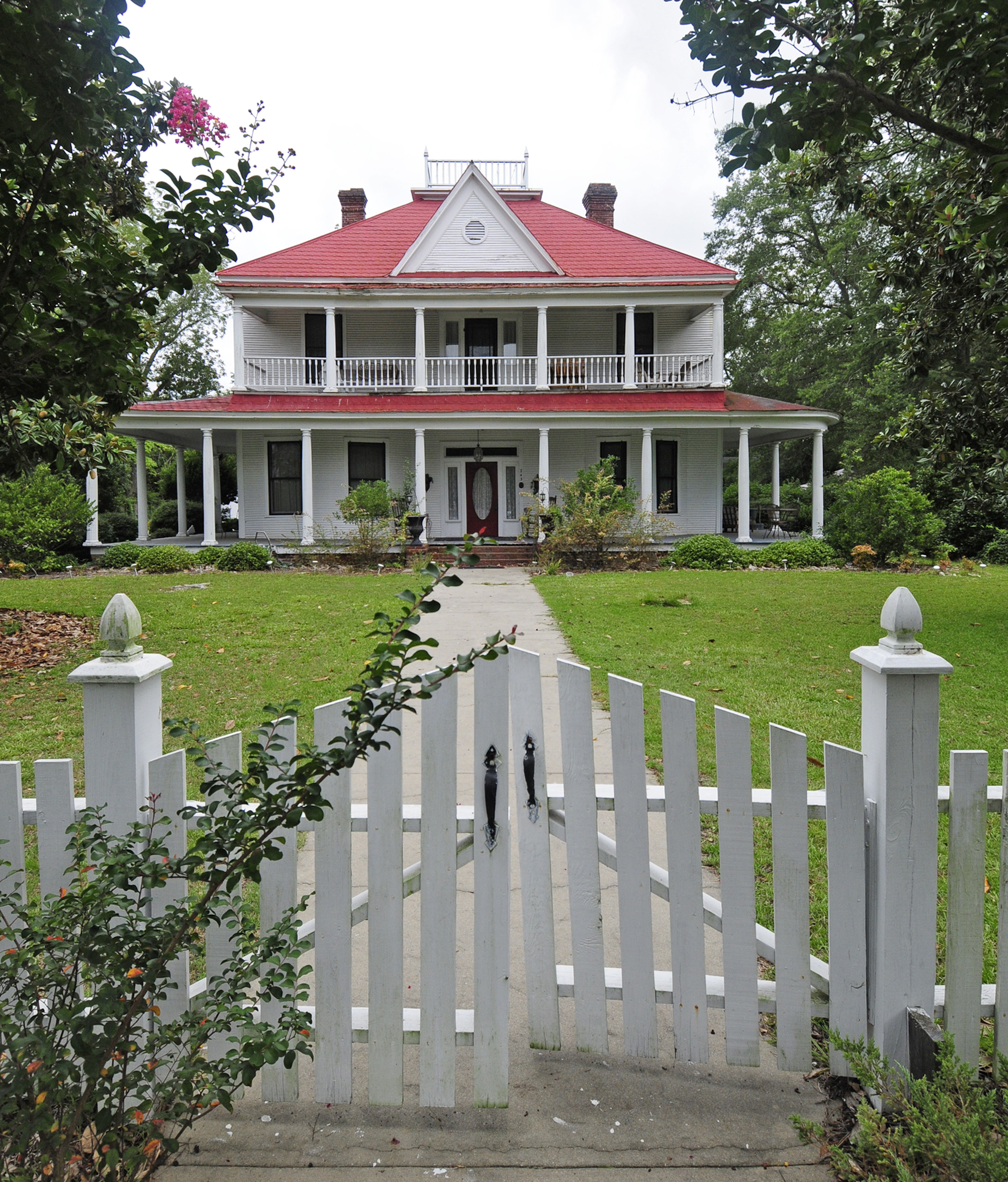
- Cartledge House, August 2012

- Location within South Carolina Location within the United States
- Location: 305 Saluda Ave., Batesburg-Leesville, South Carolina
- Coordinates: 33°54′31″N 81°33′8″W
- Area: less than one acre
- MPS: Batesburg-Leesville MRA
- NRHP reference No.: 82003879
- Added to NRHP: July 6, 1982

Cartledge House is a historic home located at Batesburg-Leesville, Lexington County, South Carolina. It was built about 1898, and is a two-story, Victorian-era weatherboard dwelling. It consists of a rectangular central block under a hipped roof with sheet metal shingles and a truncated ridge. Double gallery porches wrap around the front and side elevations on both stories ornamented by Tuscan order colonettes and turned balustrades. The front roof slope features a steep cross gable pierced by a circular vent.

It was listed on the National Register of Historic Places in 1982.
