= McKendree Mitchell House =

Historic house in South Carolina, United States

- U.S. National Register of Historic Places
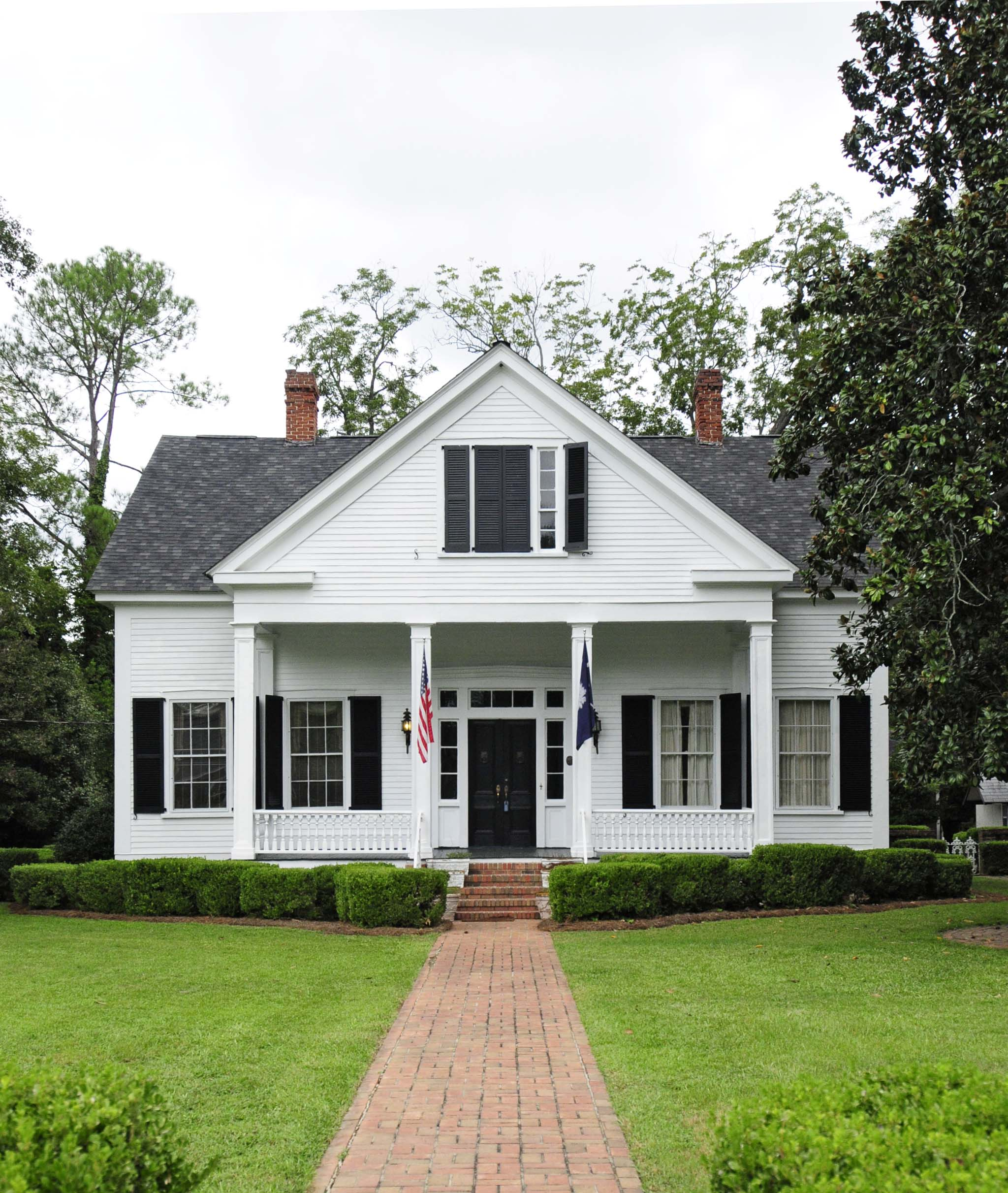
- McKendree Mitchell House, August 2012

- Location within South Carolina Location within the United States
- Location: 310 Saluda Ave., Batesburg-Leesville, South Carolina
- Coordinates: 33°54′35″N 81°33′9″W
- Area: less than one acre
- Built: 1873
- Built by: McKendree Mitchell
- Architectural style: Greek Revival
- MPS: Batesburg-Leesville MRA
- NRHP reference No.: 82003881
- Added to NRHP: July 6, 1982

McKendree Mitchell House is a historic home located at Batesburg-Leesville, Lexington County, South Carolina. It was built in 1873, and is a 1 1/2-story, Greek Revival style cottage on a brick foundation. It is sheathed in weatherboard and features a projecting central gabled portico.

It was listed on the National Register of Historic Places in 1982.
