= J. B. Holman House =

Historic house in South Carolina, United States

- U.S. National Register of Historic Places
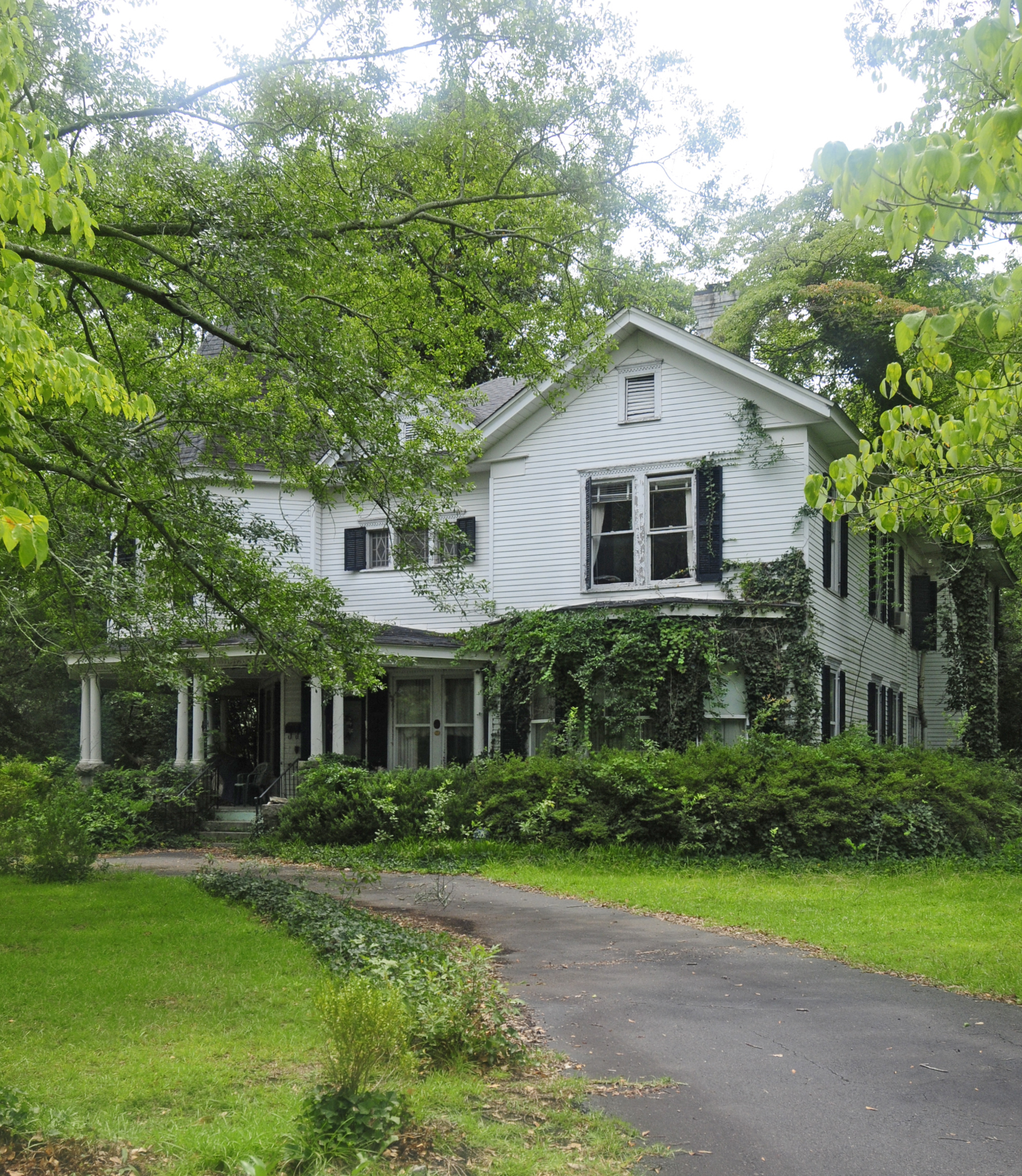
- J. B. Holman House, August 2012

- Location within South Carolina Location within the United States
- Location: N. Peachtree St., Batesburg-Leesville, South Carolina
- Coordinates: 33°54′18″N 81°33′7″W
- Area: less than one acre
- Built: 1910
- Architectural style: Queen Anne
- MPS: Batesburg-Leesville MRA
- NRHP reference No.: 82003888
- Added to NRHP: July 6, 1982

J. B. Holman House is a historic home located at Batesburg-Leesville, Lexington County, South Carolina. It was built in 1910, and is an asymmetrical, two-story Queen Anne style frame residence. It features a polygonal, tent roofed turret and wraparound porch. The hipped porch is supported by paired Tuscan order colonettes. The gabled roof is sheet metal shingles and the house is sheathed in aluminum siding.

It was listed on the National Register of Historic Places in 1982.
