= D. D. D. Barr House =

Historic house in South Carolina, United States

- U.S. National Register of Historic Places
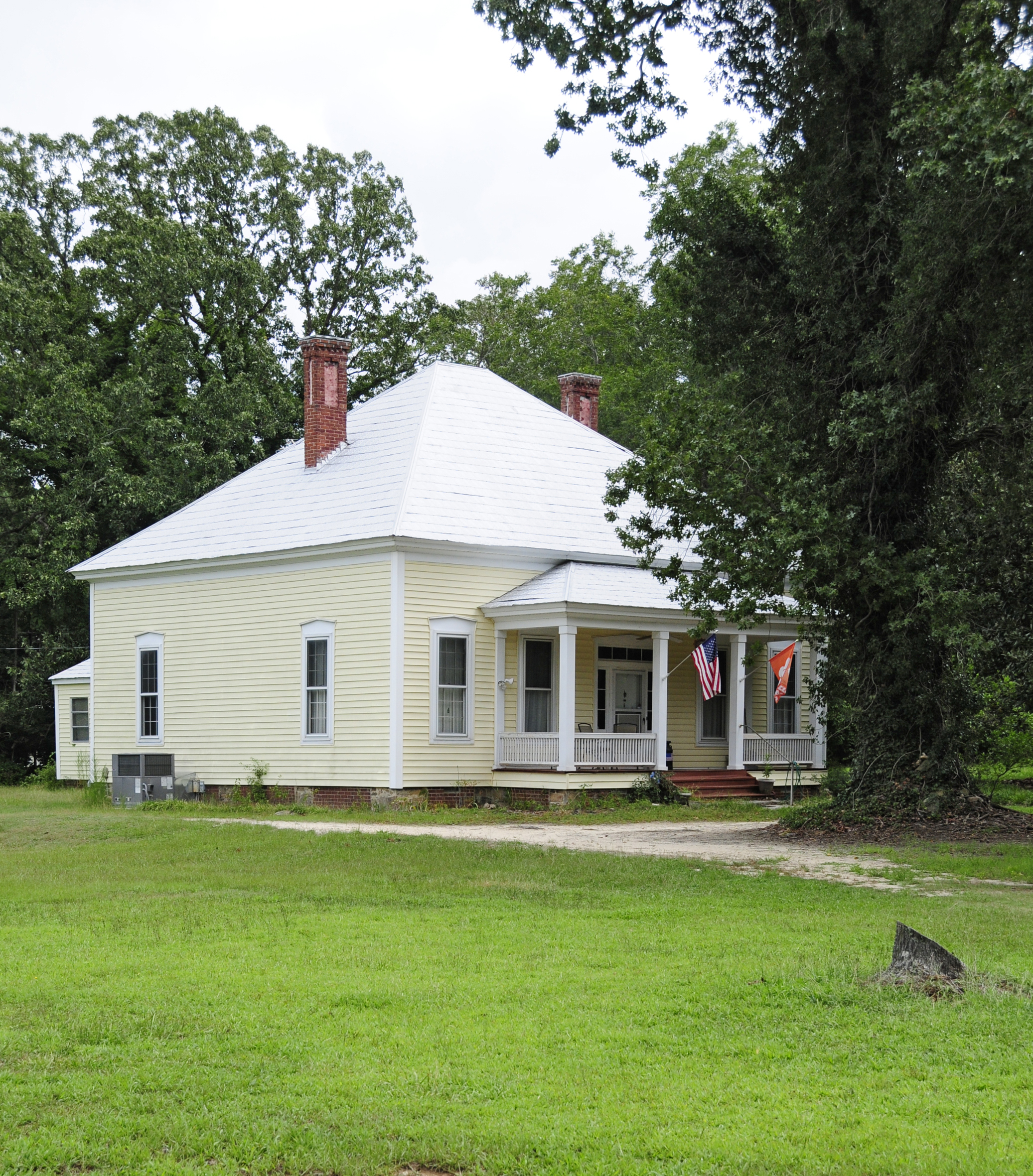
- D. D. D. Barr House, August 2012

- Location within South Carolina Location within the United States
- Location: Off South Carolina Highway 245, near Batesburg-Leesville, South Carolina
- Coordinates: 33°56′12″N 81°31′38″W
- Area: 2 acres (0.81 ha)
- Built: c. 1883
- Built by: Barr, James Michael
- MPS: Lexington County MRA
- NRHP reference No.: 83003866
- Added to NRHP: November 22, 1983

D. D. D. Barr House is a historic home located near Batesburg-Leesville, Lexington County, South Carolina. It was built about 1883, and is a one-story, frame, weatherboarded dwelling. The main core of the house has a hipped roof covered with metal shingles. A hip-roofed porch shelters three bays of the five-bay façade. Outbuildings include a 20th-century milk house.

It was listed on the National Register of Historic Places in 1983.
