= Thomas Galbraith Herbert House =

Historic house in South Carolina, United States

- U.S. National Register of Historic Places
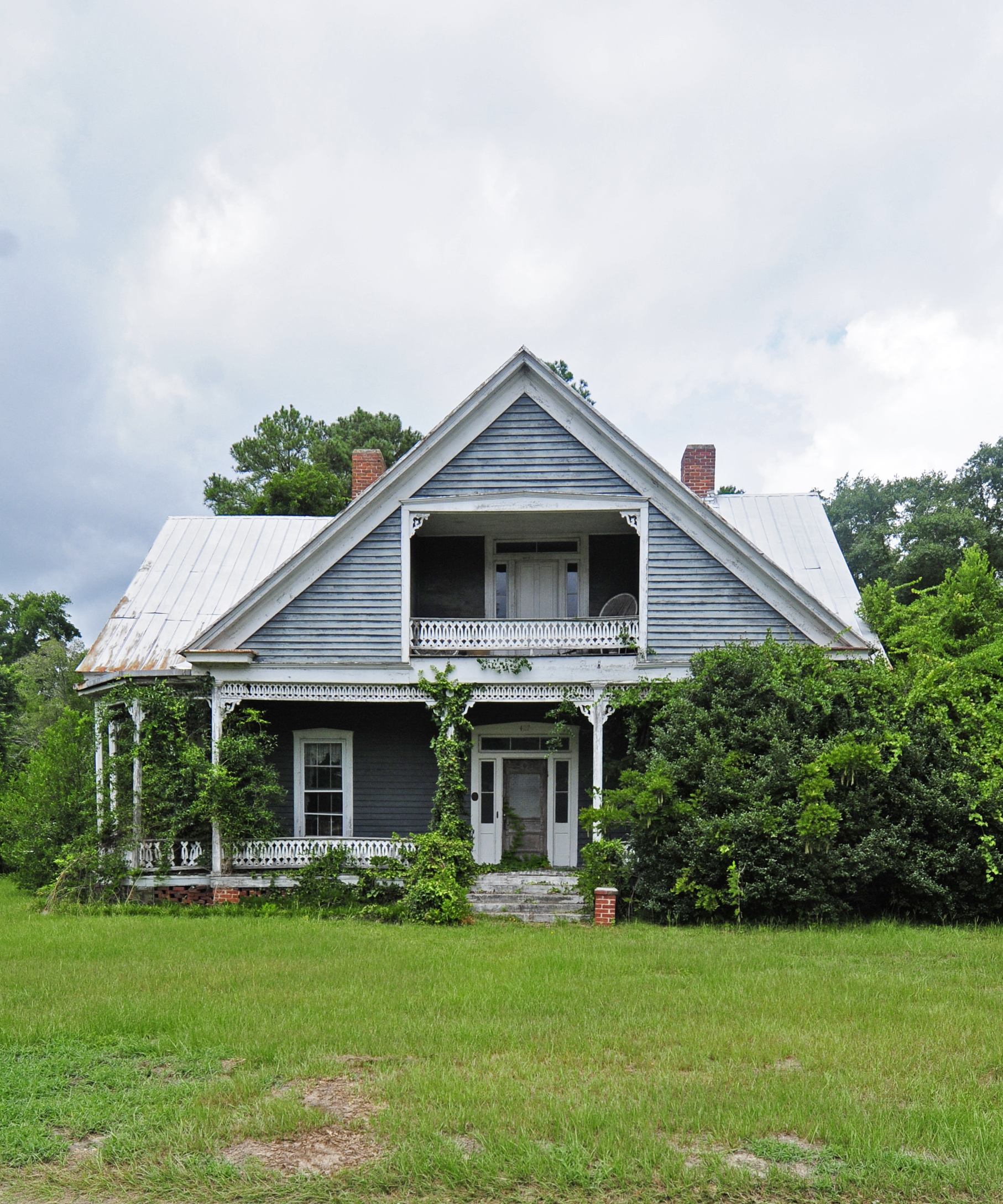
- Thomas Galbraith Herbert House, August 2012

- Location within South Carolina Location within the United States
- Location: 506 Trotter St., Batesburg-Leesville, South Carolina
- Coordinates: 33°55′32″N 81°31′5″W
- Area: less than one acre
- Built: 1878
- Architectural style: Late Victorian, Victorian Eclectic
- MPS: Batesburg-Leesville MRA
- NRHP reference No.: 82003887
- Added to NRHP: July 6, 1982

Thomas Galbraith Herbert House, also known as the Shealy House, is a historic home located at Batesburg-Leesville, Lexington County, South Carolina. It was built in 1878, and is a 1 1/2-half story Victorian Eclectic style dwelling. It is sheathed in weatherboard and has a raised seam, metal, multi-gabled roof. It features a projecting front gable with a recessed balcony and a full-width front porch.

It was listed on the National Register of Historic Places in 1982.
