= John Jacob Rawl House =

Historic house in South Carolina, United States

- U.S. National Register of Historic Places
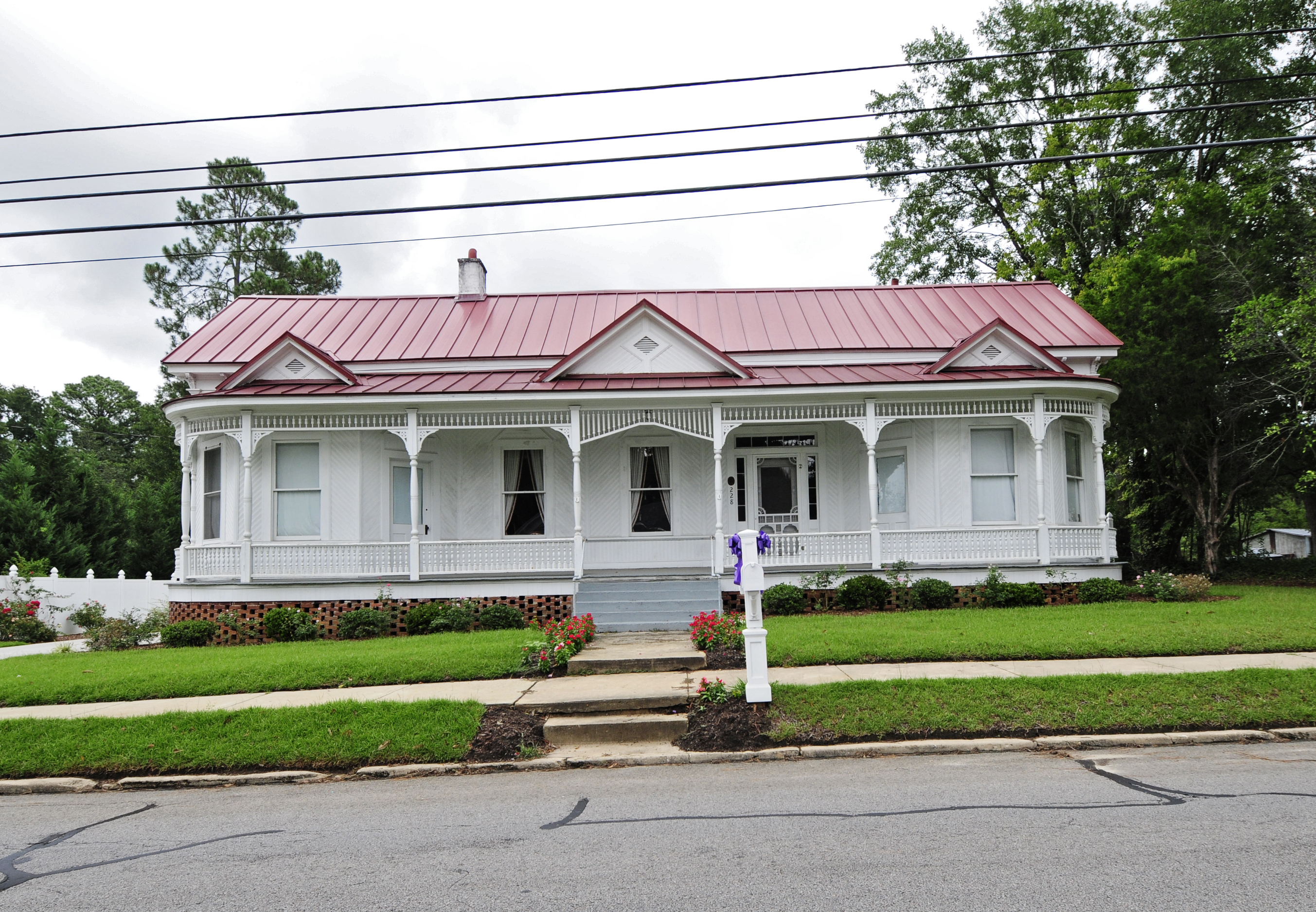
- John Jacob Rawl House, August 2012

- Location within South Carolina Location within the United States
- Location: Line St., Batesburg-Leesville, South Carolina
- Coordinates: 33°54′33″N 81°32′53″W
- Area: 2 acres (0.81 ha)
- Built: c. 1900
- Built by: Rawl, J.J.
- Architectural style: Carpenter's
- MPS: Batesburg-Leesville MRA
- NRHP reference No.: 82003882
- Added to NRHP: July 6, 1982

John Jacob Rawl House is a historic home located at Batesburg-Leesville, Lexington County, South Carolina. It was built about 1900, and is a one-story frame Victorian dwelling with elaborate carpenter's ornamentation. It has a brick pier foundation and a standing seam metal gable roof. The façade features a porch with rounded corners and an elaborate spindle frieze.

It was listed on the National Register of Historic Places in 1982.
