= Batesburg station =

- Southern Railway Depot
- U.S. National Register of Historic Places
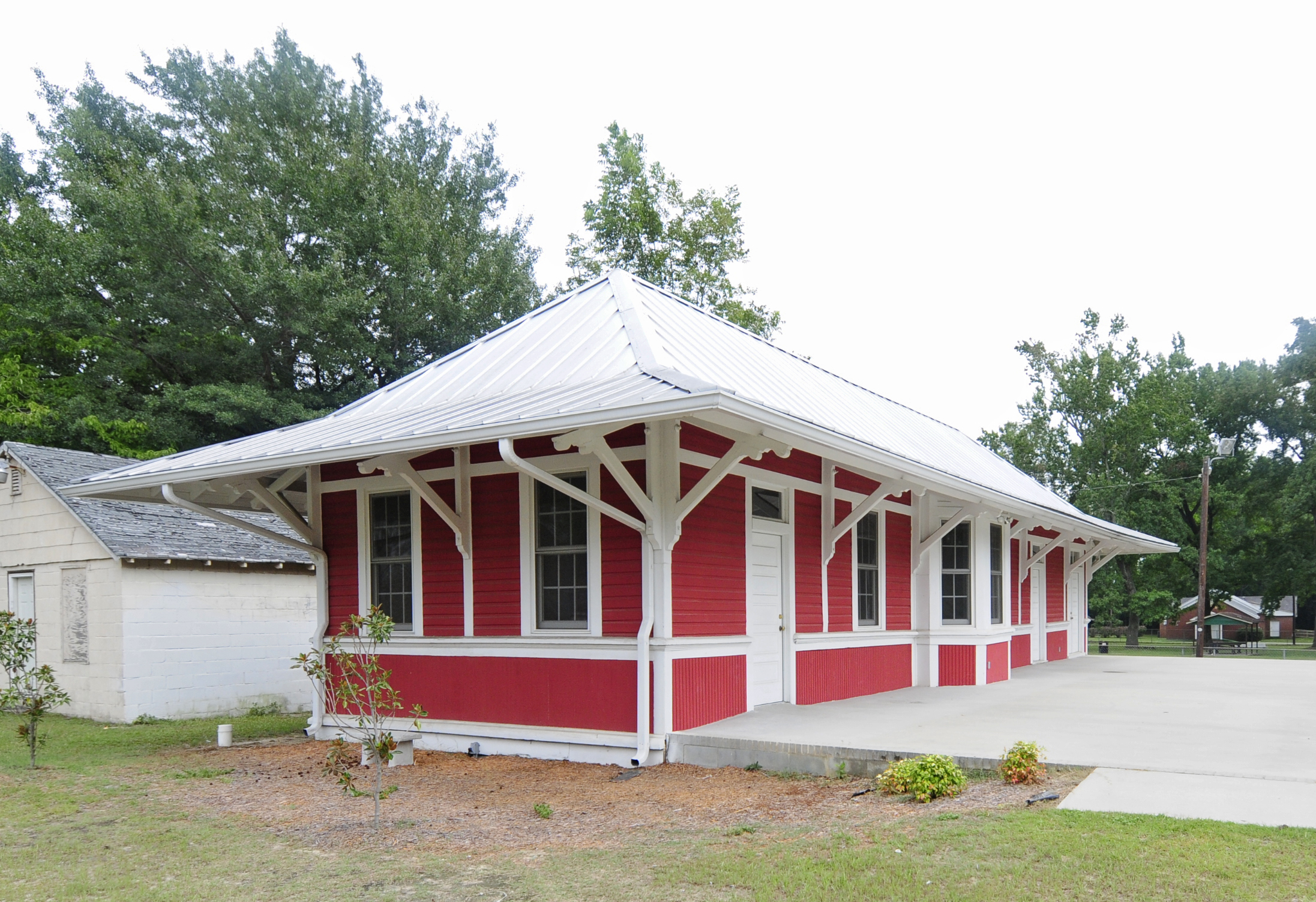
- Southern Railway Depot, August 2012

- Location within South Carolina Location within the United States
- Location: SE corner of Perry and Wilson Sts., Batesburg-Leesville, South Carolina
- Coordinates: 33°54′22″N 81°32′33″W
- Area: less than one acre
- Built: c. 1900
- MPS: Batesburg-Leesville MRA
- NRHP reference No.: 83002202
- Added to NRHP: May 27, 1983

Southern Railway Depot, also known as the Batesburg Boy Scout Hut, is a historic train station located at Batesburg-Leesville, Lexington County, South Carolina. It was built about 1900 by the Southern Railway, and is a one-story weatherboarded frame building with a bellcast hip roof. It has patterned metal shingle roofing and sawn wooden brackets supporting the deep eaves. It was relocated from its original location to its present site about 1960 and used as a meeting place for local Boy Scouts.

The building was listed on the National Register of Historic Places in 1983.

Preceding station	Southern Railway	Following station
Hibernia toward Augusta	Augusta – Columbia	Summerland toward Columbia
Terminus	Batesburg – Perry	Kneece toward Perry
