= Mitchell-Shealy House =

Historic house in South Carolina, United States

- U.S. National Register of Historic Places
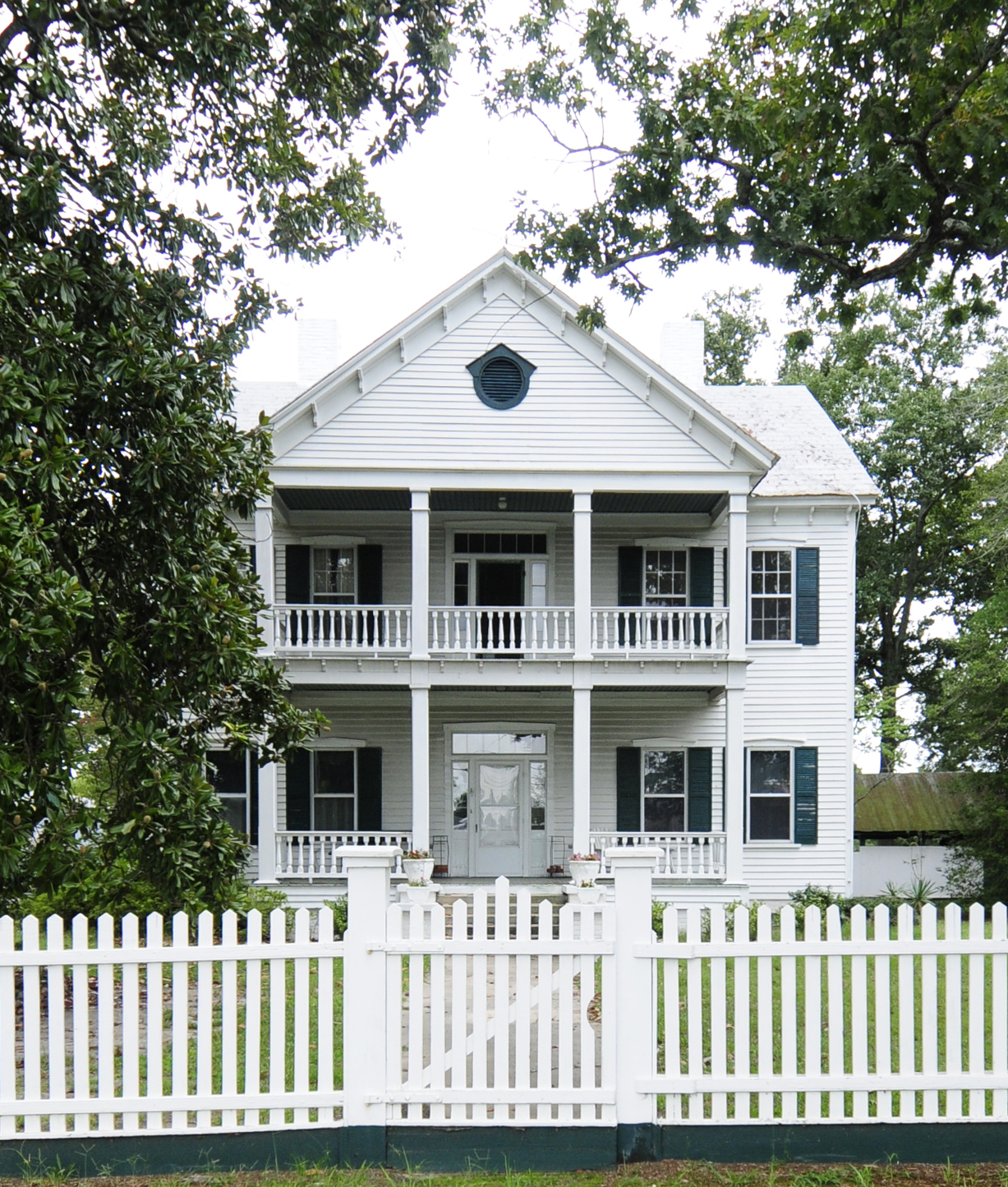
- Mitchell-Shealy House, August 2012

- Location within South Carolina Location within the United States
- Location: 419 W. Church St., Batesburg-Leesville, South Carolina
- Coordinates: 33°54′39″N 81°31′37″W
- Area: 1 acre (0.40 ha)
- Built: c. 1855
- Architectural style: Greek Revival, Late Victorian
- MPS: Batesburg-Leesville MRA
- NRHP reference No.: 82003891
- Added to NRHP: July 6, 1982

Mitchell-Shealy House, also known as the Berley Shealy House, is a historic home located at Batesburg-Leesville, Lexington County, South Carolina. It was built about 1855, and is a two-story weatherboard residence that combines Greek Revival and Italianate features. It consists of a rectangular central block and one-story, centered rear ell. It features a central projecting double portico beneath a front gable.

It was listed on the National Register of Historic Places in 1982.
