= Rawl-Couch House =

Historic house in South Carolina, United States

- U.S. National Register of Historic Places
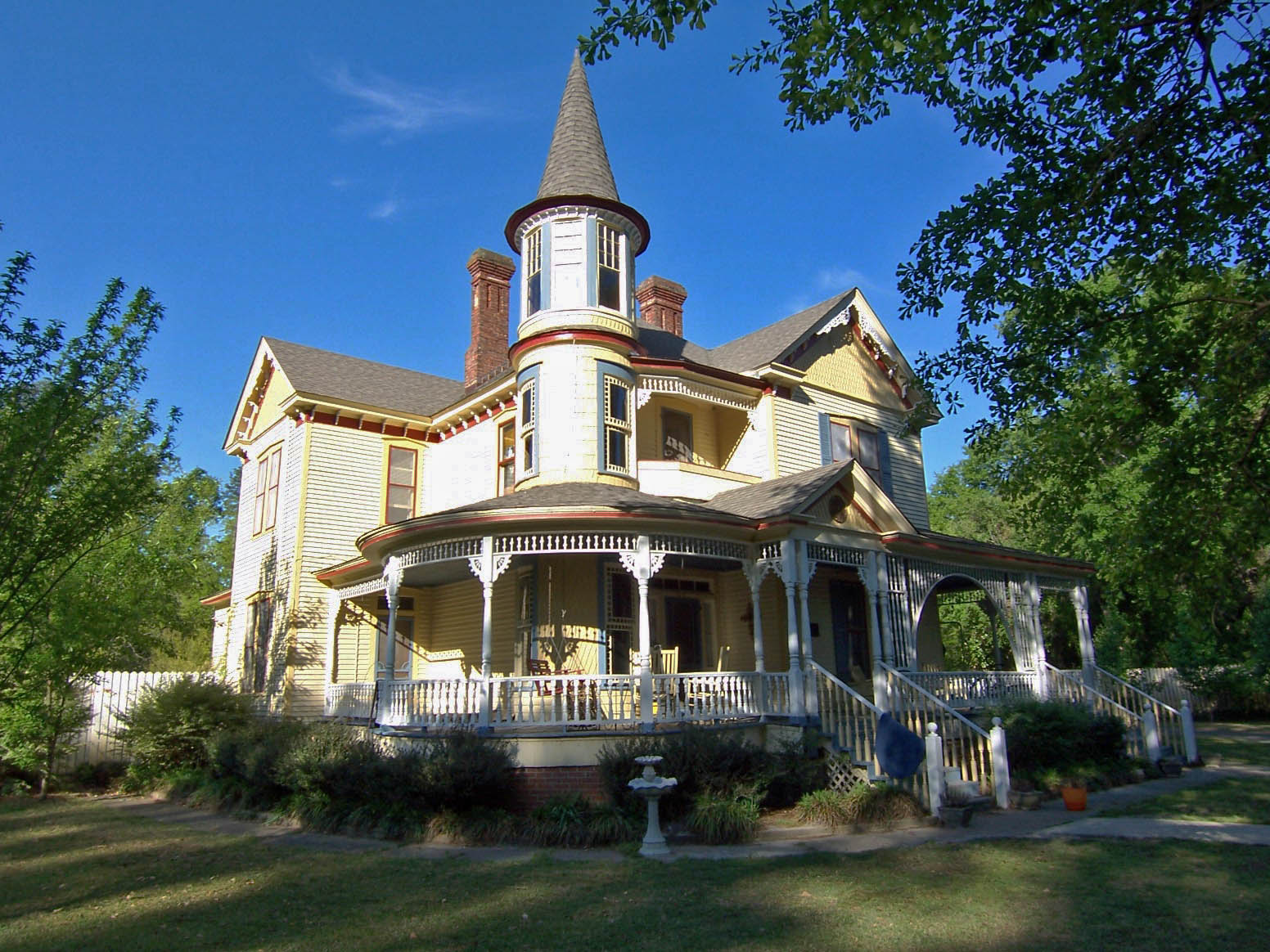
- Front of the house

- Location within South Carolina Location within the United States
- Location: 22 Short St., Batesburg, South Carolina
- Coordinates: 33°54′29″N 81°33′14″W
- Area: 2.1 acres (0.85 ha)
- Built: 1893
- Architectural style: Queen Anne
- MPS: Batesburg-Leesville MRA
- NRHP reference No.: 82003883
- Added to NRHP: July 6, 1982

The Rawl-Couch House is located in Batesburg-Leesville, South Carolina.

== Construction ==
This two-story, asymmetrical frame dwelling is the area's most distinctive Queen Anne residence. The house was originally constructed in 1893 as a Methodist school, then enlarged and remodeled in its present style in 1908 by John Jacob Rawl, using modified George F. Barber plans to include the one room school house as the new dining room. The house has a one-story wraparound porch, supported by turned posts, with an elaborate arched spindle frieze and turned balusters. A three-story shingle clad turret, with a conical roof rises at the left side of the facade; it is a balanced by a gabled pavilion on the right, with an intricately sawn bargeboard. A second-floor balcony between the turret and the pavilion has a spindle frieze, repeating that of the main porch. The foundation of the house is brick; the roof is original sheet metal shingles. Two corbeled chimneys pierce the central block's steep hip roof. A multi-paned transom and side lights frame the front door.

== History ==
John Jacob Rawl and his son David built the house for his widowed daughter-in-law, Mrs. Annie Rawl, who had been married to his son, Ed. Ed Rawl died in an accident at one of his father's lumber factories in Florida. In the 1930s, the house was purchased by D.E. Couch as a family home. It was renovated and updated during the 1980s, and in 1984 the home was entered into the National Register of Historic Places, along with most of the downtown and several other notable homes in the immediate area.
