= Church Street Historic District (Batesburg-Leesville, South Carolina) =

Historic district in South Carolina, United States

- U.S. National Register of Historic Places
- U.S. Historic district
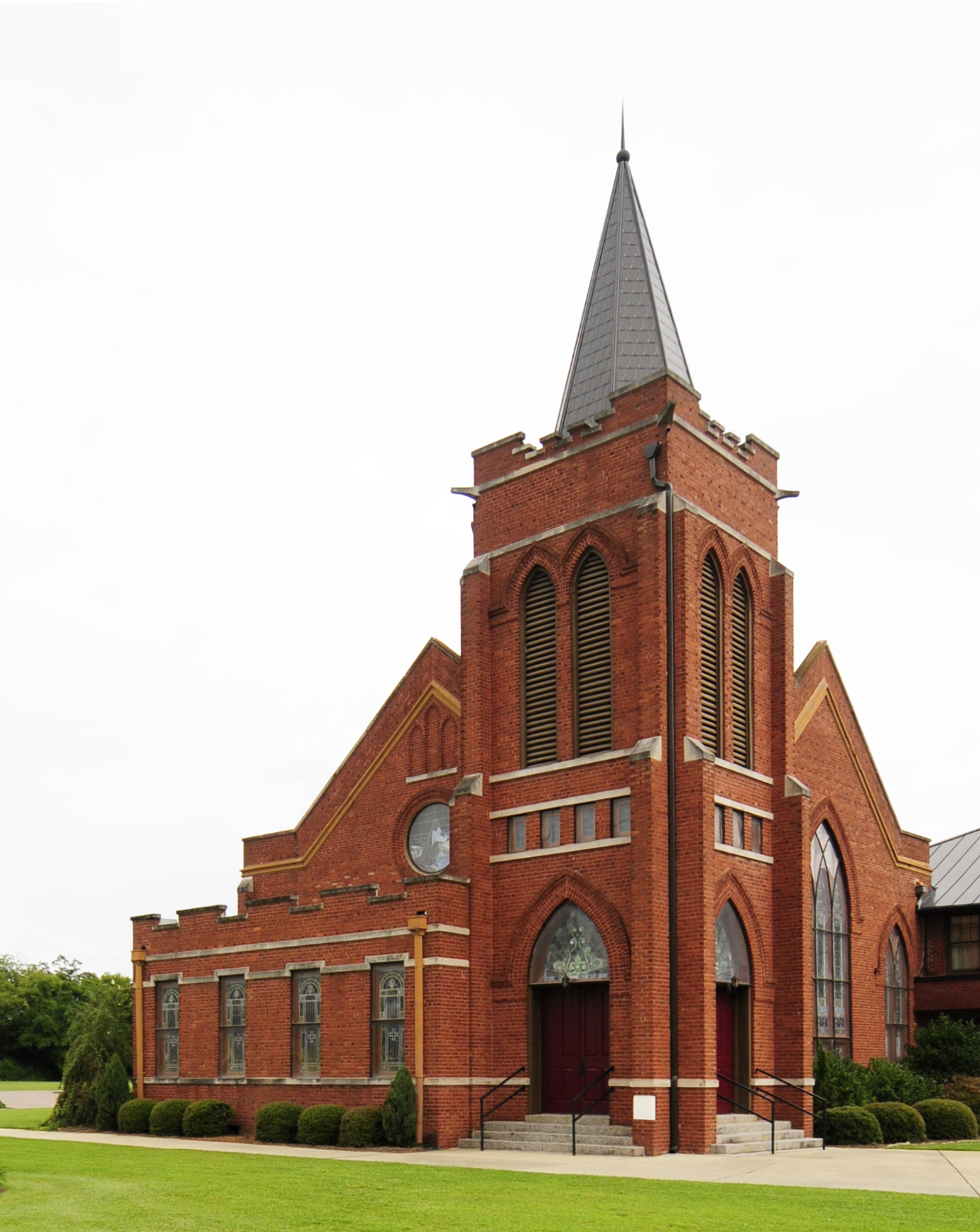
- Church Street Historic District, August 2012

- Location within South Carolina Location within the United States
- Location: Church St., Batesburg-Leesville, South Carolina
- Coordinates: 33°55′09″N 81°30′24″W
- Area: 13.7 acres (5.5 ha)
- Built: 1895
- Architect: Multiple
- Architectural style: Italianate, Queen Anne, Gothic Revival
- MPS: Batesburg-Leesville MRA
- NRHP reference No.: 82003884
- Added to NRHP: July 6, 1982

Church Street Historic District is a national historic district located at Batesburg-Leesville, Lexington County, South Carolina. It encompasses nine contributing buildings in a residential section of Leesville. They were largely constructed between about 1865 and 1909, with one house built after 1910. The district includes the Gothic Revival style Leesville Methodist Church (1909) and notable Italianate and Queen Anne style residences.

It was listed on the National Register of Historic Places in 1982.
