= Rev. Frank Yarborough House =

Historic house in South Carolina, United States

- U.S. National Register of Historic Places
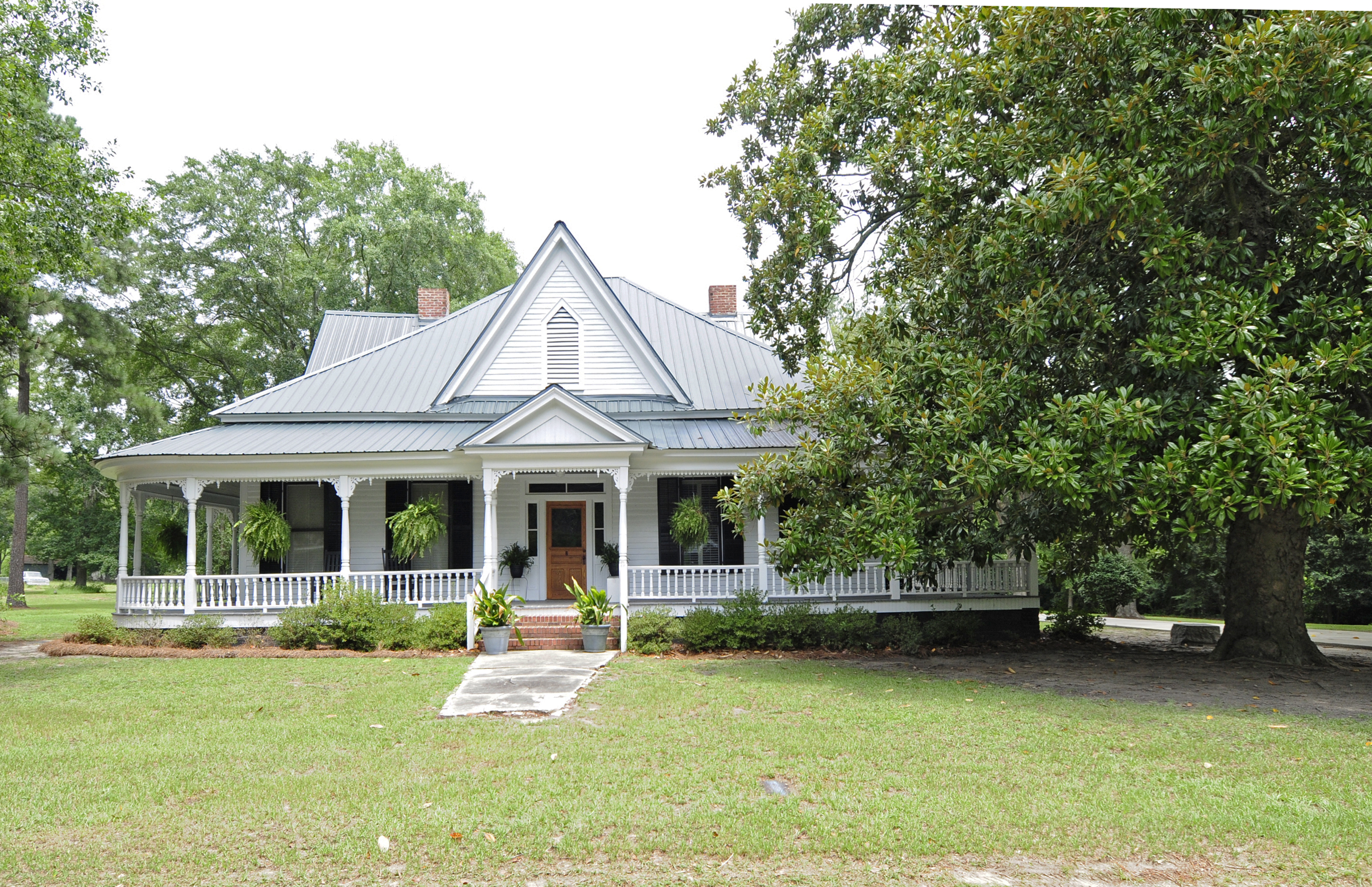
- Reverend Frank Yarborough House, August 2012

- Location within South Carolina Location within the United States
- Location: 810 Bernard St., Batesburg-Leesville, South Carolina
- Coordinates: 33°55′30″N 81°30′57″W
- Area: 1.6 acres (0.65 ha)
- Built: c. 1906
- Architectural style: Late Victorian, Victorian Cottage
- MPS: Batesburg-Leesville MRA
- NRHP reference No.: 82003892
- Added to NRHP: July 6, 1982

Rev. Frank Yarborough House is a historic home located at Batesburg-Leesville, Lexington County, South Carolina. It was built about 1906, and is a one-story frame Victorian cottage set on open brick piers. It features an ornamented wraparound porch and a steep central cross gable.

It was listed on the National Register of Historic Places in 1982.
