= Broadus Edwards House =

Historic house in South Carolina, United States

- U.S. National Register of Historic Places
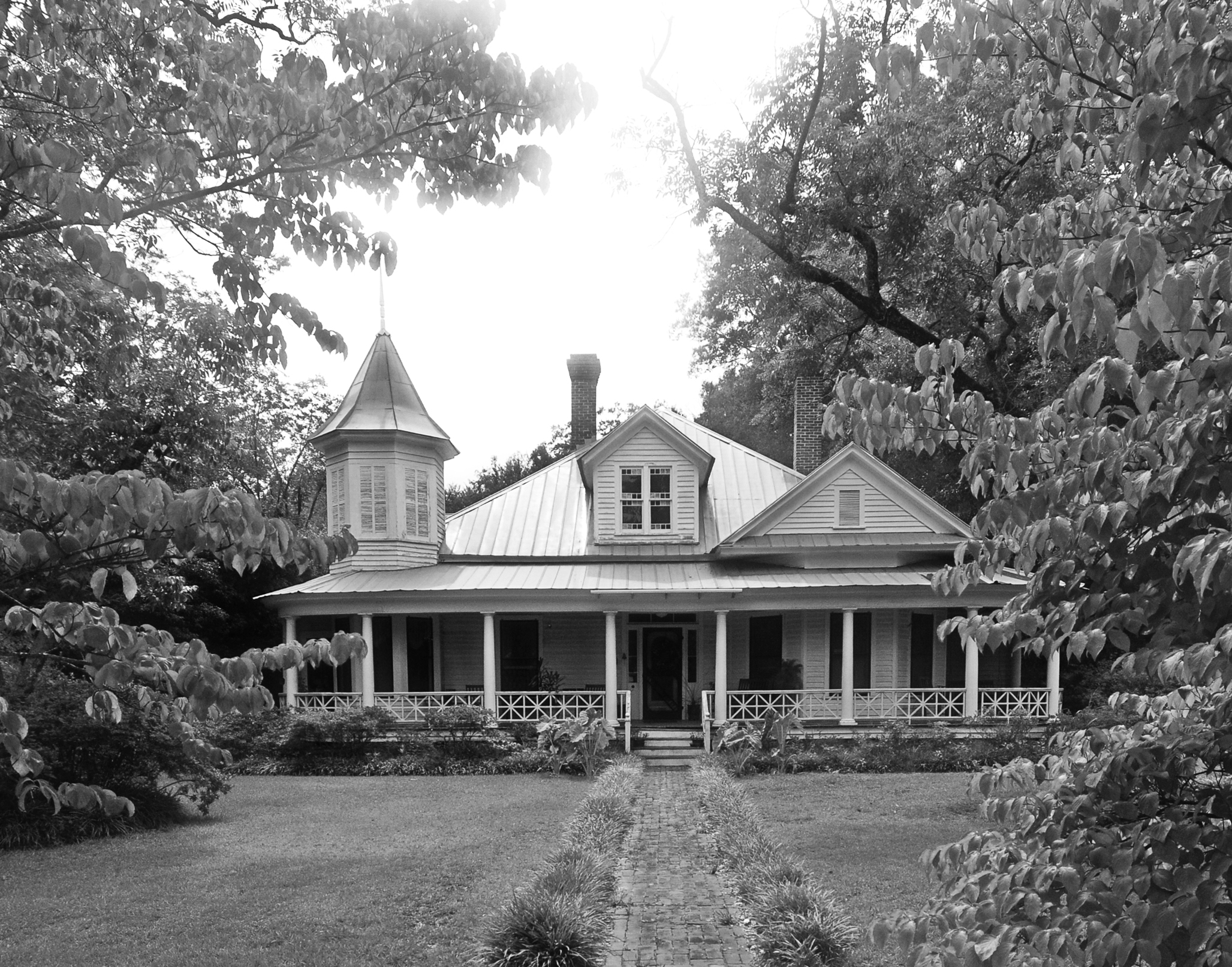
- Broadus Edwards House, August 2012

- Location within South Carolina Location within the United States
- Location: North Peachtree St., Batesburg-Leesville, South Carolina
- Coordinates: 33°54′12″N 81°33′3″W
- Area: 1.3 acres (0.53 ha)
- Built: 1905
- MPS: Batesburg-Leesville MRA
- NRHP reference No.: 82003877
- Added to NRHP: July 6, 1982

Broadus Edwards House, also known as the Paul Garber House, is a historic home located at Batesburg-Leesville, Lexington County, South Carolina. It was built in 1905, and is a 1 1/2-story, Queen Anne style weatherboard residence set on a brick foundation. It has a two-story turret under a tent roof and a bay surmounted by a pedimented cross gable. The house was built by Broadus Edwards, prominent Batesburg merchant, mortician, and town councilman.

It was listed on the National Register of Historic Places in 1982.
