= Simon Bouknight House =

Historic house in South Carolina, US

- U.S. National Register of Historic Places
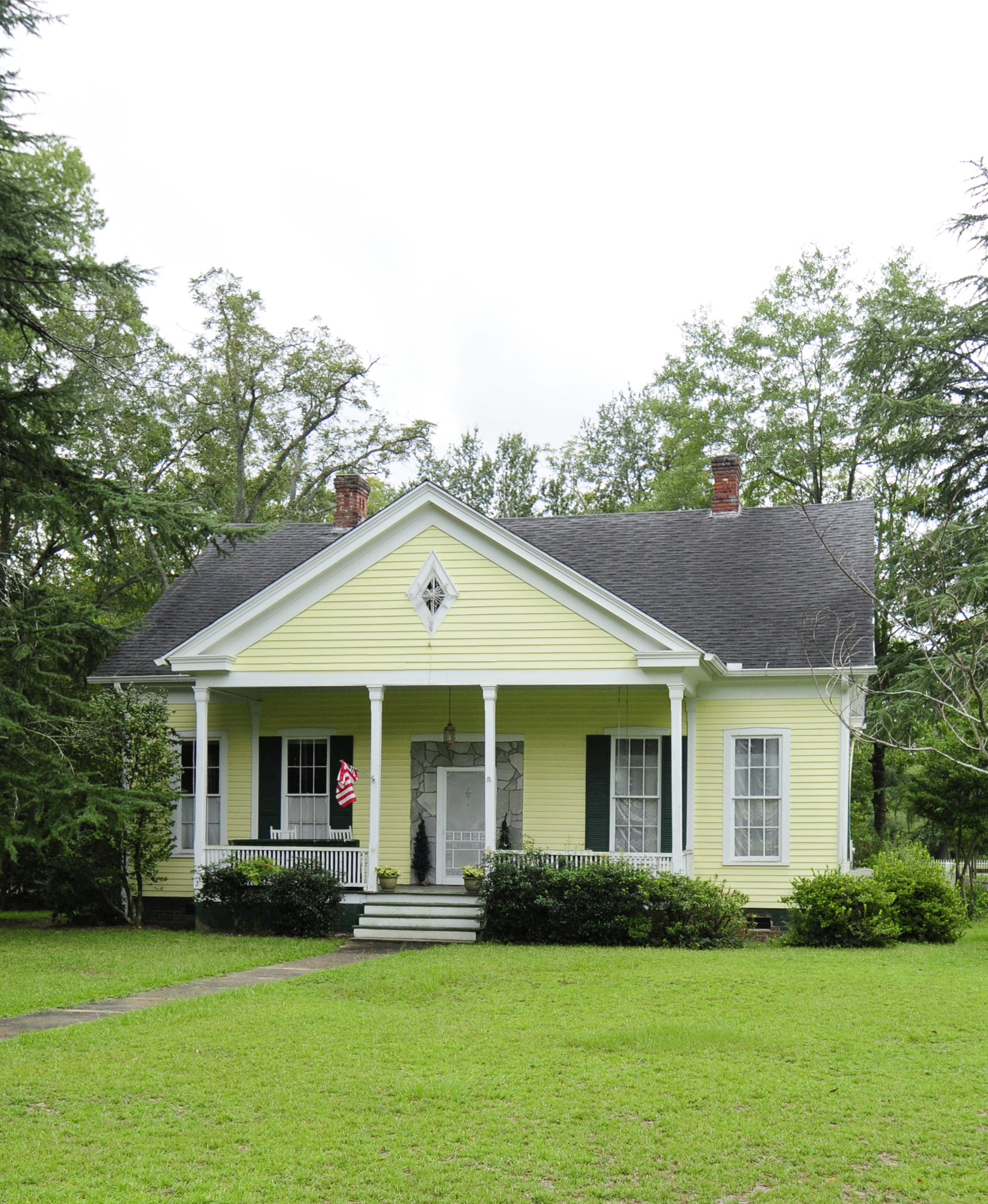
- Simon Bouknight House, August 2012

- Location within South Carolina Location within the United States
- Location: Saluda Ave., Batesburg-Leesville, South Carolina
- Coordinates: 33°54′32″N 81°33′10″W
- Area: 0.3 acres (0.12 ha)
- Architectural style: Victorian
- MPS: Batesburg-Leesville MRA
- NRHP reference No.: 82003876
- Added to NRHP: July 6, 1982

Simon Bouknight House is a historic home located at Batesburg-Leesville, Lexington County, South Carolina. It was built in 1890, and is a one-story, weatherboarded Victorian cottage under a gabled roof. It has a gabled projecting central porch supported by four regularly spaced slender wood posts; front and end gables with cornice returns and centered, diamond-shaped windows; and corbeled chimneys. The house is set on a lattice brick foundation.

It was listed on the National Register of Historic Places in 1982.
