= Leesville College Historic District =

Historic district in South Carolina, United States

- U.S. National Register of Historic Places
- U.S. Historic district
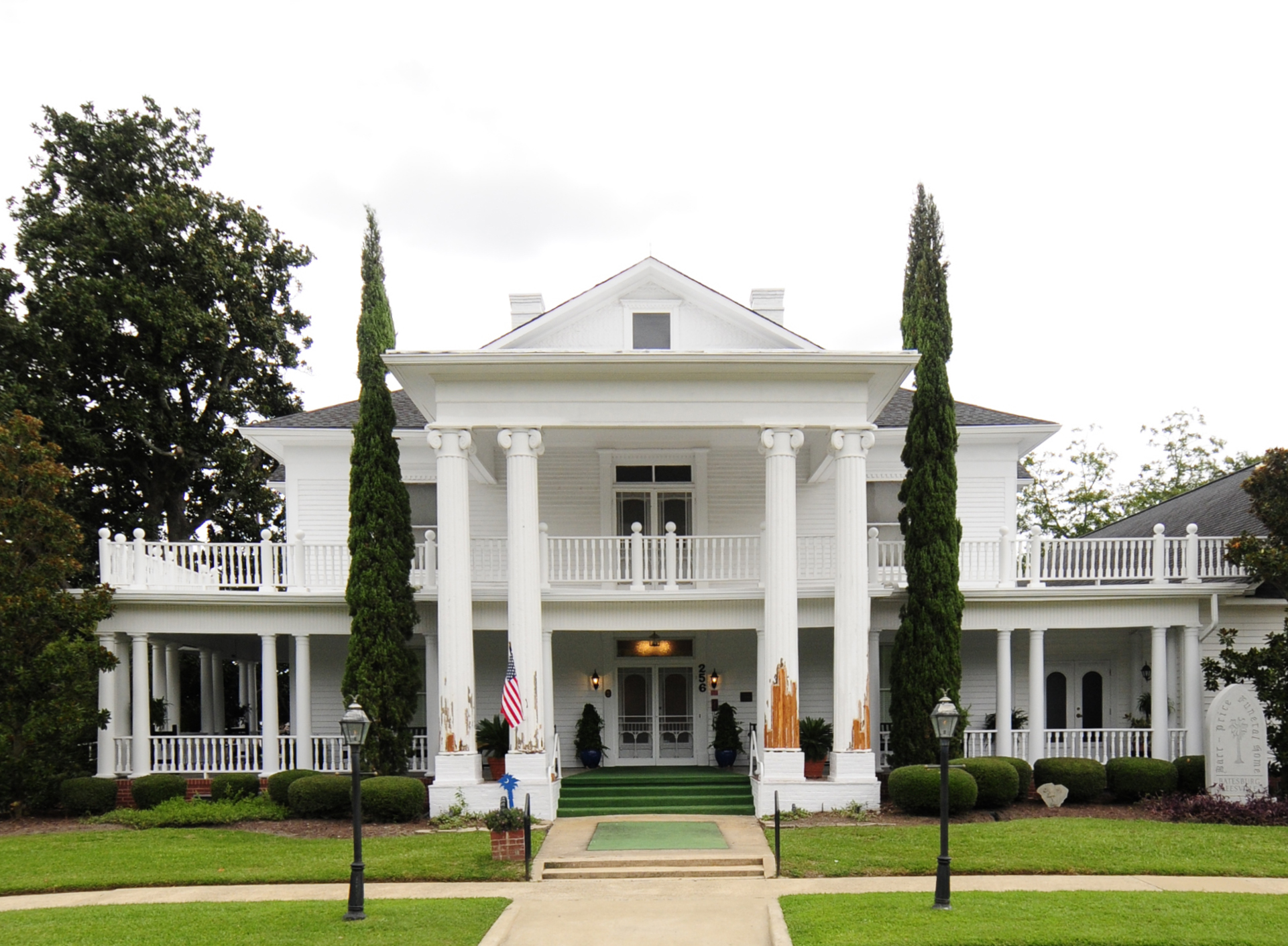
- Leesville College Historic District, August 2012

- Location within South Carolina Location within the United States
- Location: Railroad Ave., College, Peachtree, King, and Lee Sts., Batesburg-Leesville, South Carolina
- Coordinates: 33°55′14″N 81°30′55″W
- Area: 31 acres (13 ha)
- Built: 1883
- Architect: Multiple
- Architectural style: Late Victorian, Victorian Vernacular Styles
- MPS: Batesburg-Leesville MRA
- NRHP reference No.: 82003889
- Added to NRHP: July 6, 1982

Leesville College Historic District is a national historic district located at Batesburg-Leesville, Lexington County, South Carolina. It encompasses 28 contributing buildings associated with the Busbee Brothers’ School and the Leesville English and Classical Institute. The district includes institutional and residential buildings in a range of vernacular Victorian architectural styles.

It was listed on the National Register of Historic Places in 1982.
