= Seibel =

Seibel or Seibels is a surname. Notable people with the surname include:

- Albert Seibel (1844–1936), French physician and viticulturist
- Edwin G. Seibels (1866–1954), the inventor of the vertical filing system
- Henry Seibels (1876-1967), American football player
- Klauspeter Seibel (1936–2011), German conductor of the Louisiana Philharmonic Orchestra
- Cathy Seibel (b. 1960), American federal judge
- John Seibel (b. 1970), American journalist who has worked for ESPN
- Tara Seibel (b. 1973), American artist (cartoonist)
- Phil Seibel (b.1979), former left-handed starting/relief baseball pitcher
- Michael Seibel (b. 1982), managing director at Y Combinator
- Kevin Seibel (b. 1983), Canadian professional ice hockey defenceman
