= Walton McLeod =

American politician, businessman, and attorney

Walton (Walt) McLeod

Member of the South Carolina House of Representatives from the 40th district
- In office November 1996 – January 2017
- Succeeded by: Rick Martin

Personal details
- Born: Walton James McLeod III; June 30, 1937 (age 89) Walterboro, South Carolina
- Party: Democratic
- Spouse: Julie E. Hamiter
- Children: Walton James McLeod IV
- Education: Yale University
- Occupation: Attorney, businessman, philanthropist

Walton James "Walt" McLeod III, (born June 30, 1937), is a former Democratic member of the South Carolina House of Representatives, representing the 40th District from 1996 until 2017. McLeod, a businessman and attorney, earned his B.A. from Yale University in 1959 and his L.L.B. from the University of South Carolina in 1964. While at the University of South Carolina, he was president of the Clariosophic Society.

In 1964, he served as a law clerk to Judge Clement Haynsworth of the United States 4th Circuit Court of Appeals. From 1967 to 1968 McLeod was an assistant United States Attorney. He served as General Counsel for the South Carolina Department of Health and Environmental Control, 1968–1994. He was also the Deputy South Carolina Attorney General from 1987 to 1988.

McLeod is married to Julie E. Hamiter, with one child. He is also a veteran of the United States Navy which he served from 1959 to 1961 as well as 1963. He also attained the rank of captain in the United States Navy Reserve.

In 2016, after serving 21 years in office, he decided to retire from politics. Rick Martin, a Republican, defeated Carlton Kinard, a Democrat, to win McLeod's seat.
