= WUSC-FM =

College radio station at the University of South Carolina in Columbia

Coordinates: 34.001°N 81.022°W

- United States
- Broadcast area: Columbia, South Carolina
- Frequency: 90.5 MHz (HD Radio)
- Branding: WUSC-FM

Programming
- Format: Free-Format
- Subchannels: HD2: World music

Ownership
- Owner: University of South Carolina

History
- First air date: January 17, 1977
- Call sign meaning: University of South Carolina

Technical information
- Licensing authority: FCC
- Class: A
- ERP: 2,500 watts
- HAAT: 77 meters (253 ft)

Links
- Public license information: Public file; LMS
- Website: wusc.sc.edu

WUSC-FM (90.5 MHz) is a student-run college radio station operating at the University of South Carolina in Columbia, South Carolina.

== Purpose ==
The purpose of WUSC-FM is to "educate and inform the listener and the DJ by providing musical diversity, information regarding student life and community events, and by airing Public Service Announcements." It is not related to KUSC, the classical radio station owned by the University of Southern California; the two institutions happen to share initials.

== Content ==
WUSC-FM is a free-format non-commercial educational radio station. The station's policy prohibits playing music that is in rotation at any other local station, or that has been on the Top 40 charts within the past 40 years. (This rule is sometimes ignored for special events, such as all-Beatles weekends or weekends devoted to the music of the 1980s). Some DJs have specialty shows, handling one genre such as soundtracks, hip-hop music, or electronic music. DJs who have "free-format" shows are required to play three genres of music during their show. Free-format show DJs are also required to grab 50 percent of what they play from heavy and light rotation. The station is owned and operated by the University of South Carolina.

WUSC is governed by the Board of Student Publications and Communications, the Department of Student Life, the Director of Student Media, and the USC Board of Trustees (the USC Board of Trustees holds the station's license).

A vast majority of the DJs at WUSC are current students at the university. However, the station allows faculty, staff, and WUSC alumni to host shows as well. One particular show, Red Bank Bar and Grill, has been aired off and on since 1978. It is currently the only show that is three hours long year-round; during the fall and spring semesters, shows are two hours long and air once per week. During summer and some academic breaks, shows become three hours long.

Each DJ is responsible for the content of their show, and several of the shows have unique names and themes. Names in the Spring 2006 semester include "Bitch Stole My Fish", "Concordia Discourse", "Billfred in the Niiiiiightiiiiiiiiime!" (which airs on Friday mornings), "Ska is for Suckers", and "Still Questionable".

Some notable shows over the years have included Locals Only (featuring bands from South Carolina, North Carolina, and Georgia), The Columbia Beet (local bands played live in the studio), the Red Bank Bar and Grill (an alternative country program), The Weekend Kicker (on Friday afternoons), Musical Mutiny (Sunday afternoons 1977-8, a progenitor of experimental/mash-up/sampling/"difficult" sounds; "Knox Abbott" was doing guerrilla radio about 30 years before it would become fashionable), Metal Cock Radio (an all heavy metal program), Origami (the station's first K-pop programming block), Blast From the Past (one of the earliest shows to focus on more esoteric music from the 1960s, first aired in 1978 and featuring groups such as the "Chocolate Watchband" and "Lothar and the Hand People"; a few years after the originator of the show had graduated and moved on, more recent listeners remember his apprentice, Freewheelin' Frank assuming the role of host).

Some notable DJs have included Orlando (from the early 1970s), Steven Prazak (late 70s-early 80s), Terry Rosen (musician) (jazz programming, late 70s-early 80s), Uncle Gram (host of the Red Bank Bar and Grill), "Knox Abbott" (host of Musical Mutiny), Clair DeLune (host of the Blues Moon), "Aris" (70's-80's hosted a weekend show of folk/Celtic/etc.), Brent "Studdog" Riley (a long time alumni DJ), Marc Minsker (The Outside Jazz show), Brian Kushera (jazz), Alec Edelson (host of "Metal Cock Radio"), Brian Glazer (mainly news/talk, but did music shows, too), Mark Bryan (guitarist for the band Hootie and the Blowfish), and DJs B-Rad and Cadence (hosts of the Sunday night show "All the Vibes").

== History ==
WUSC began as an AM station broadcasting at 640 kHz in 1947. In 1958, it was allocated the frequency of 89.9 MHz but moved to 730 kHz in the mid 1960s. However, its first broadcast as WUSC-FM was not until January 17, 1977, at 91.9 MHz.

During the period 1977–1982, one legal station ID featured a booming voice authoritatively announcing the station's "10,000 microwatts of power!", and another employed trumpet fanfare while majestically proclaiming, "...all the way to Cayce!", light-hearted jabs at the limited listening range of the ten watt signal. After "WUSC, Columbia," in the background of the "...all the way to Cayce!" ID, one could hear a very laid-back male voice ask "...what about Elgin?" Due to the geological lay of the land in relation to the station's antenna, the ten watt signal was known to reach listeners in Elgin, SC, to the northeast, as well as South Congaree, SC, to the southwest, especially on cloudy or overcast days, even though WUSC's effective radiated range was approximately 2 miles. Elgin and South Congaree are both townships situated on hills at approximately the same elevation as that original ten watt antenna, so there was no interference from tall buildings or other hills, and the frequency modulation wave could travel uninterrupted to these listeners' receivers, defying the distance limits. In the 50's and 60's, the 10-watt station broadcast on 89.9 on FM, and it had a classical format, including a show on Sundays called the "Operatic Theater." It began to publish its programming for the first time in "The State" newspaper from Columbia on July 1, 1953, with the frequency listed as 89.9 in the Radio Guide section. The 730am station at that time had a different format and could only be received in college dormitories.

Despite its weak signal, the station management and music programming WUSC enjoyed from the onset of its licensing on the FM band established it as a musical force in the Greater Columbia area. WUSC subscribed to CMJ from the journal's inception in 1978: in so doing, WUSC's ten watt signal became one of a few beacons scattered across the national map, leading the country in the revolutionary underground music scene that would explode across America. By the time cable TV added MTV to its line-up in 1981, a significant portion of those cable TV subscribers in Columbia, SC immediately recognized MTV's "new" national artists as those which WUSC had been giving regular airplay since 1977.

Due to a restructuring of FCC law regarding low power stations across the country in 1982, WUSC had to boost its signal to at least 100 watts or lose its license to broadcast. Ending broadcast was never considered an option from the moment the FCC announced the new requirements, as WUSC had made its indelible mark on the air waves in Columbia, recognized as a unique and invaluable contributor to the surrounding community. At the time, there was little cost difference between a boost to 100 watts vs. one of 3000 watts—for example, the station would have to vacate the 91.9 frequency once its signal exceeded ten watts, regardless how powerful the new signal would be—administrators, therefore, made the decision to increase the signal to 3000 watts. It was then that WUSC-FM moved to its current frequency of 90.5 MHz.

In the early years of this wider-reaching phase of the station's existence, WUSC was led by Station Manager, Marc Fink; Program Director, Art Boerke; and Music Director, Rick "The Muffin Man" Wiener: this team instituted the fifty percent new music policy, insuring WUSC would continue its established role as one of Americas best, most respected college radio stations. The 3000 watt signal meant that specialty programming, such as Massive Metal, hosted by "Dredge Slug," aka Carl Singmaster (who later founded Manifest Discs and Tapes), could now easily waft to the metalheads all throughout Lexington County, for example. Increased listener accessibility from this significantly more powerful signal led to greater regional recognition of WUSC, rapidly becoming more broadly popular across the Midlands. Soon WUSC was involved with bringing multiple live music shows to Columbia.

WUSC-FM eventually had to reduce its power to its current 2,500 W because of fringe interference with another FM station.

In 1986, WUSC was featured in Rolling Stone Magazine, referring to WUSC as one of "The Taste Makers", in the College Issue of that year.

Although WUSC had a 14K webstream at the turn of the 21st century, the Digital Millennium Copyright Act (DMCA) introduced confusion to all Non-commercial educational (NCE) radio stations shortly afterwards. Due to the legal issues and exorbitant fees the DMCA threatened to impose, hundreds of NCE stations suspended all webstreaming beginning in 2002; WUSC was among these stations silenced on the web. In 2003, national legislators finally modified the DMCA such that NCE stations would be able to stream music and other copyrighted material at a reasonable cost, and WUSC-FM has been streaming its signal over the Internet regularly ever since.

In June 2006, WUSC-FM upgraded to a new high-definition digital transmitter which cost $70,000. The new signal provides CD-quality digital audio and also improves reception in fringe areas. The new transmitter includes a data channel for station name, names of songs and artists, plus other information. It also makes it possible for WUSC to broadcast several channels of audio simultaneously.

On March 26, 2007, WUSC sponsored an event where the world record for simultaneous yo-yoing was broken. The total number of people participating in the event was 932.

=== The 1995 shutdown ===
In 1995, WUSC was shut down and its executive staff fired. The incident came after Chris Carroll, who was USC's Director of Student Media at the time, levied several allegations against the station, such as the station's license being "flagged" by the FCC for revocation because of the airing of a song by the band Pansy Division, as well as several secondary violations. (The staff later learned that this, among several other allegations by Carroll, was unfounded.)

Several members of the WUSC executive staff responded by publicly criticizing Carroll and the University administration through WUSC, The Daily Gamecock student newspaper and other local media outlets. As a result, the executive staff was removed by Jerry Brewer and Chris Carroll, and the station was operated solely by Carroll.

The station remained off the air for a brief period before resuming under new leadership and DJs selected by the Board of Student Publications. (A few DJs returned to the station from before, but many were either not invited to return or left in protest.) Before the new executive staff was selected, the DJs were allowed to play what they wanted, resulting in Top 40 music being aired on the station. However, once in power, the new staff returned to the prior music policy. But the damage had been done, and the station was also dropped as a reporter to CMJ, which charts college radio airplay.

Since Carroll's departure in 1997, the station has moved back towards its alternative/underground format, which had the station listed in some music journals as one of the top five college stations in the United States.
