= Clariosophic Society =

Literary society at the University of South Carolina, US

- ΜΣΦ
- Founded: February 1806; 220 years ago University of South Carolina
- Type: Literary
- Affiliation: Independent
- Status: Active
- Scope: Local
- Chapters: 1
- Alternative name: Mu Sigma Phi
- Headquarters: Columbia, South Carolina; United States

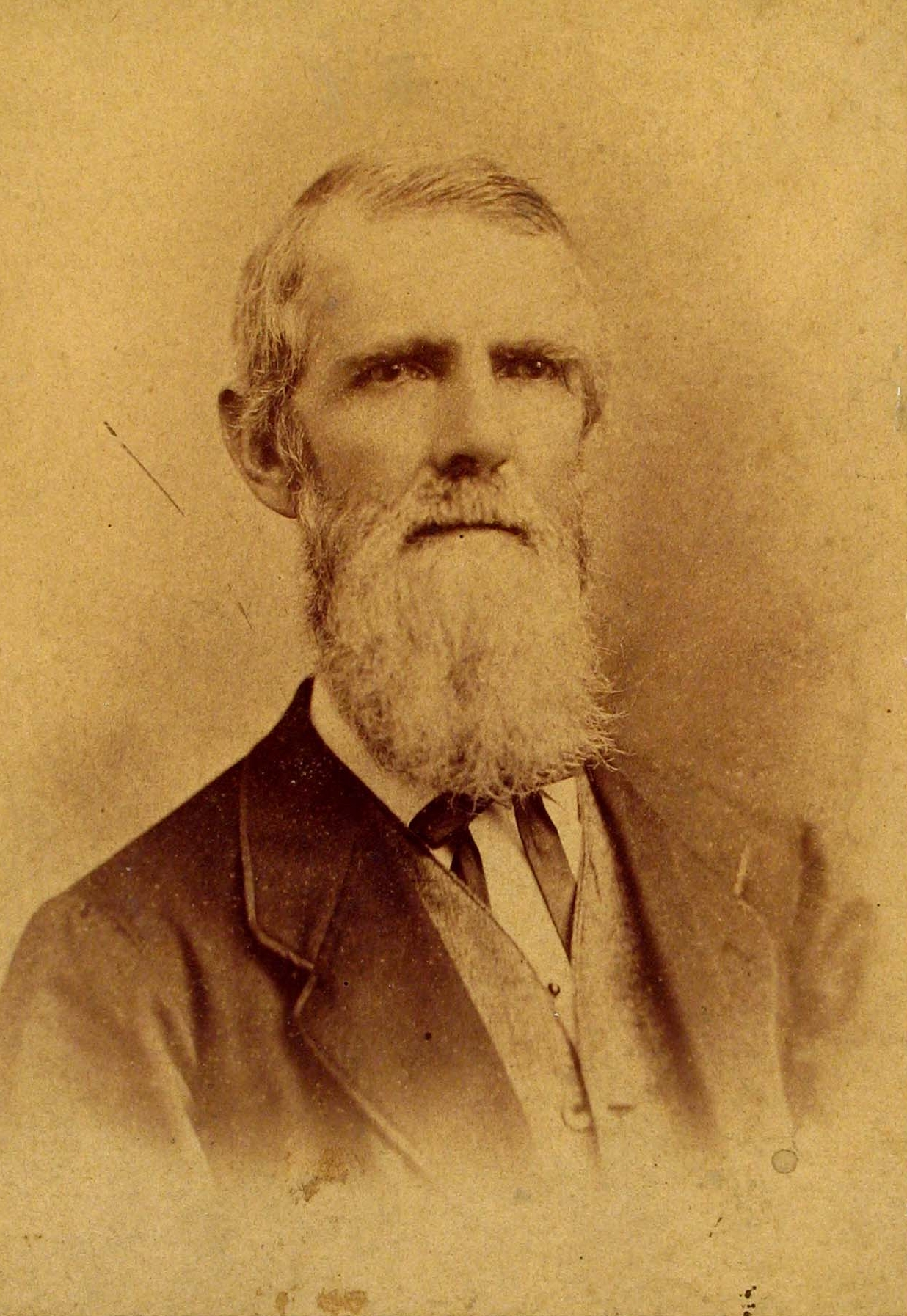
Henry William Ravenel

Hugh S. Legaré

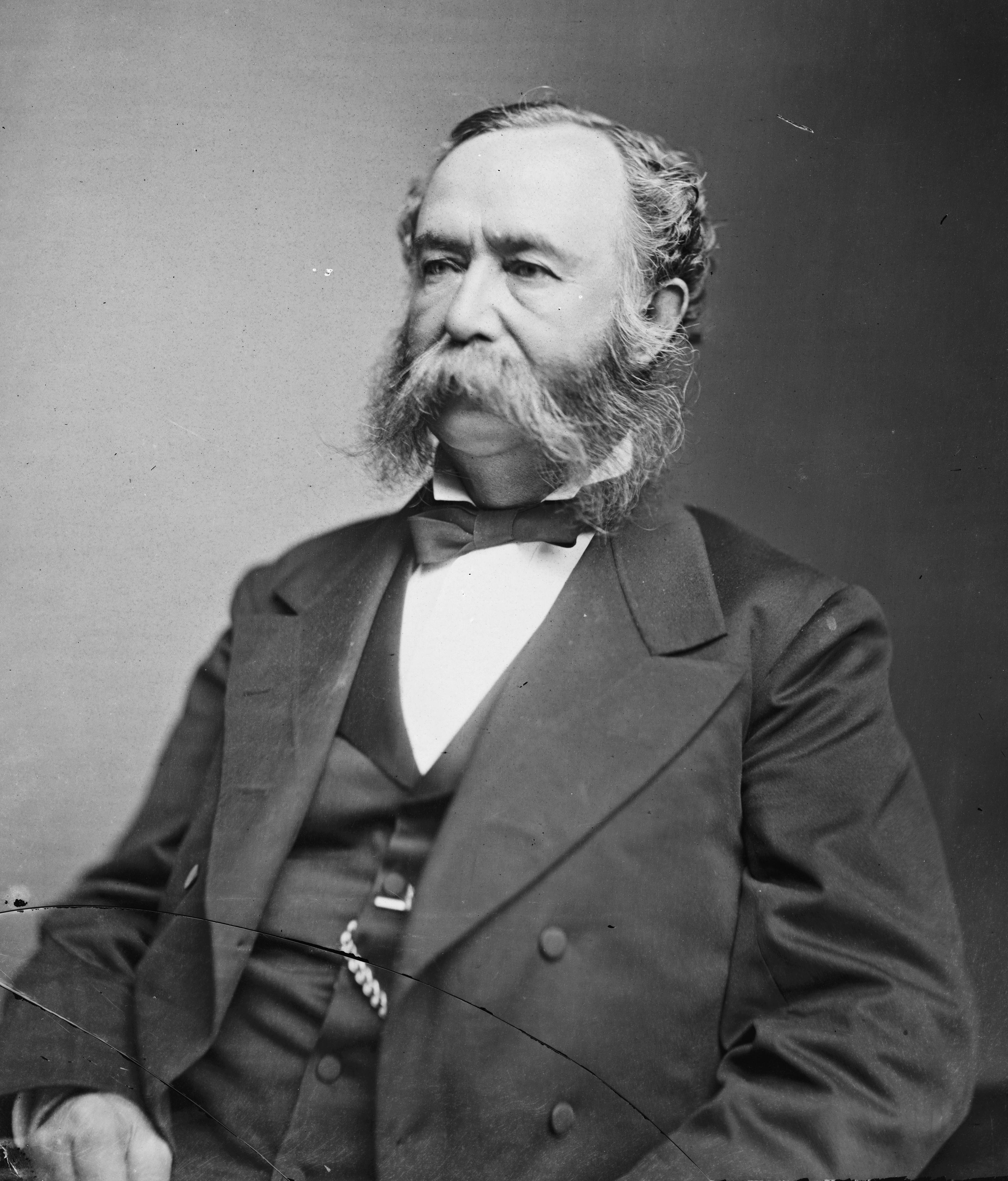
Wade Hampton III

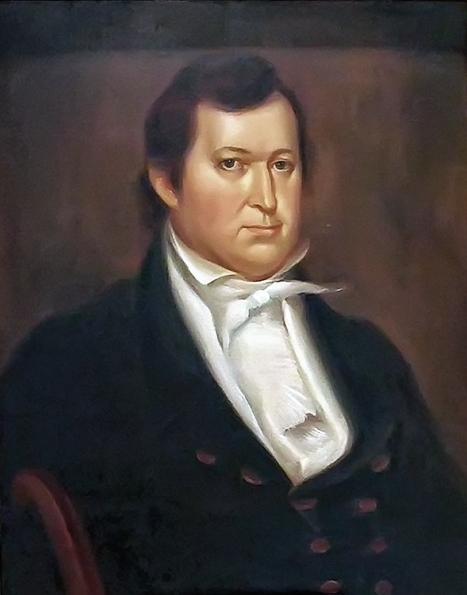
John Murphy, fourth governor of Alabama

The Clariosophic Society, also known as Mu Sigma Phi (ΜΣΦ), is a literary society founded in 1806 at the University of South Carolina, then known as South Carolina College, as a result of the splitting in two of the Philomathic Society, which had been formed within weeks of the opening of the college in 1805 and included virtually all students. At what was called the Synapian Convention held in February 1806, the members of Philomathic voted to split into two separate societies, one of which became known as Clariosophic, while the other society became known as Euphradian. Two blood brothers picked the members for the new groups in a manner similar to choosing sides for an impromptu baseball game. John Goodwin became the first president of Clariosophic. Other early presidents include Stephen Elliott, Hugh S. Legaré. George McDuffie and Richard I. Manning. The society became inactive in the 1970s but was reactivated in 2013.

== Symbols ==
Applicants who had fulfilled all the requirements for membership were given the society's Latin Diploma along with its key to signify their membership. Somewhere along the way, the giving of keys ceased but the key still appeared on the diplomas. The key was shaped like a rhombus or lozenge except that the sides did not meet at the top and bottom, but were blunted off. The front had two overlapping hearts at the top with the Greek letters, Mu Sigma Phi (ΜΣΦ) in the center and the initials C.S., for Clariosophic Society, at the bottom. The reverse side had the two hearts at the top and two Greek words beginning with the letters, Delta and Phi (ΔΦ) in the center and the initials S.C.C, for South Carolina College, at the bottom.

== Notable members ==
=== 19th Century ===
Notable members of the 19th Century include:

- Preston Brooks, later U.S. Representative from South Carolina
- Andrew Pickens Butler, later U.S. senator from SC
- William Butler, later physician and U.S. Representative from South Carolina
- Patrick C. Caldwell, later U.S. Representative from South Carolina
- James Calhoun, later president of the Georgia Senate and mayor of Atlanta, Georgia
- John C. Calhoun US Vice President (Honorary member)
- William Capers, later pastor of Columbia's Washington Street Church and a bishop of the Methodist Episcopal Church, South
- William K. Clowney, later U.S. Representative from South Carolina
- Mark Anthony Cooper, later U.S. Representative from Georgia
- Anderson Crenshaw, the first graduate of the South Carolina College, now the University of South Carolina, and later Alabama Supreme Court justice.
- James Dellet, later U.S. Representative from Alabama
- Stephen Elliott, later First Episcopal Bishop of Georgia & Presiding Bishop of the Episcopal Church in the CSA
- John Gayle, Clariosophic president, later governor of Alabama
- Robert Budd Gilchrist, U.S. federal judge in SC
- William Henry Gist, later governor of SC
- Wade Hampton III, later governor of SC and U.S. senator from SC
- Hopkins Holsey, later U.S. Representative from Georgia
- Hugh S. Legaré, later US Attorney General
- Dixon Hall Lewis, later U.S. Senator from Alabama
- Charles James McDonald, later governor of Georgia and Georgia supreme court justice
- George McDuffie, later SC Governor and U.S. Senator from SC
- Basil Manly, later Baptist minister and president of the University of Alabama
- Richard I. Manning, later SC Governor and U.S. Representative from South Carolina
- John Murphy, later governor of Alabama
- John Belton O'Neall (1793–1863), South Carolina State Representative 1816–1828, Judge of the South Carolina Court of Appeals 1830, and member of the U.S. O'Neall political family
- Eugenius Aristides Nisbet, later U.S. Representative from Georgia and Georgia Supreme Court justice
- William T. Nuckolls, later U.S. Representative from South Carolina
- Francis Wilkinson Pickens, later U.S. Representative from South Carolina, U.S. ambassador to Russia and Governor of South Carolina
- Henry L. Pinckney, later U.S. Representative from South Carolina
- Henry William Ravenel, Botanist
- James Rogers, later U.S. Representative from South Carolina
- Benjamin Glover Shields, later U.S. Representative from Alabama and United States Chargé d'Affaires in Venezuela
- Edwin G. Seibels, while a student served in the SC House; later became an insurance executive and invented the vertical filing cabinet.
- Waddy Thompson, Jr., later U.S. Representative from South Carolina
- Louis T. Wigfall, US Senator from Texas and Confederate Senator from Texas

=== 20th Century ===
- Robert Elliott Gonzales, founding editor of The Gamecock (later renamed The Daily Gamecock) and distinguished journalist at The State newspaper
- William Jennings Bryan Dorn, U.S. representative from South Carolina
- Walton James McLeod, III, member of the South Carolina House of Representatives
- Strom Thurmond, 103rd Governor of South Carolina (1947–1951) and U.S. senator from South Carolina (1954–2003)
- John C. West, 109th Governor of South Carolina (1971–1975) and U.S. Ambassador to Saudi Arabia (1977–1981)

== Resources ==
- Haygood, Tamara Miner (2006). Henry William Ravenel, 1814–1887 South Carolina scientist in the Civil War Era, Tuscaloosa: University of Alabama Press.
- Hollis, Daniel Walker (1951). University of South Carolina, volume I: South Carolina College, Columbia: University of South Carolina Press.
