= Edwin G. Seibels =

American politician

Edwin Grenville Seibels (September 12, 1866 – December 21, 1954) was the inventor in 1898 of the vertical filing system that has been in extensive use for over a century. Although he applied for a patent for his system, it was denied on the ground that it was only an idea, not a device.

He was born in Columbia, South Carolina, grew up in Mount Willing, the family cotton plantation in Edgefield County, now Saluda County and went to work in the family's Columbia-based insurance business, E. W. Seibels and Son (now the Seibels Bruce Group) in 1882 at age 16 while attending South Carolina College (now the University of South Carolina) from which he graduated in 1885. While a student there he was elected to Phi Beta Kappa, Omicron Delta Kappa and the Clariosophic Society. In 1909 he was elected to the South Carolina House of Representatives. His knowledge of cotton family helped him to become successful in exporting and insuring cotton.
