= The Daily Gamecock =

University of South Carolina student news organization

- Type: Student newspaper
- Format: Online
- Owner: University of South Carolina
- Publisher: University of South Carolina Board of Student Publications and Communications - Office of Student Media
- Editor: Nat Campbell
- Founded: 1908 (as The Gamecock)
- Language: English
- Headquarters: 1400 Greene Street; Russell House, 3rd floor Columbia, SC 29208; United States
- Price: Free
- Website: dailygamecock.com

The Daily Gamecock (formerly The Gamecock) is the editorially independent student news organization of the University of South Carolina. It primarily serves the main campus of the University of South Carolina System in the state of South Carolina.

== History ==
The Gamecock logo pre-fall 2006.

The first issue of The Gamecock was published on January 30, 1908. Robert E. Gonzales, a student and the president of The Clariosophic Society, was primarily responsible for the paper's establishment. Initially, only members of one of the university's two all-male literary societies, The Euphradian Society and The Clariosophic Society, were permitted to join the newspaper's staff; this requirement was later abandoned.

In its first semester only three issues were produced, but in the following term the paper began weekly production. The paper eventually moved to publication on Monday, Wednesday, and Friday, and in the fall semester of 2006 began publishing Monday through Friday publication. At this time, it was renamed The Daily Gamecock and became the first student paper in South Carolina to publish daily.

On January 30, 2008, the newspaper completed 100 years of operation, which it marked with prizes, a special letterhead, historical headlines, and an alumni ball celebrating the milestone.

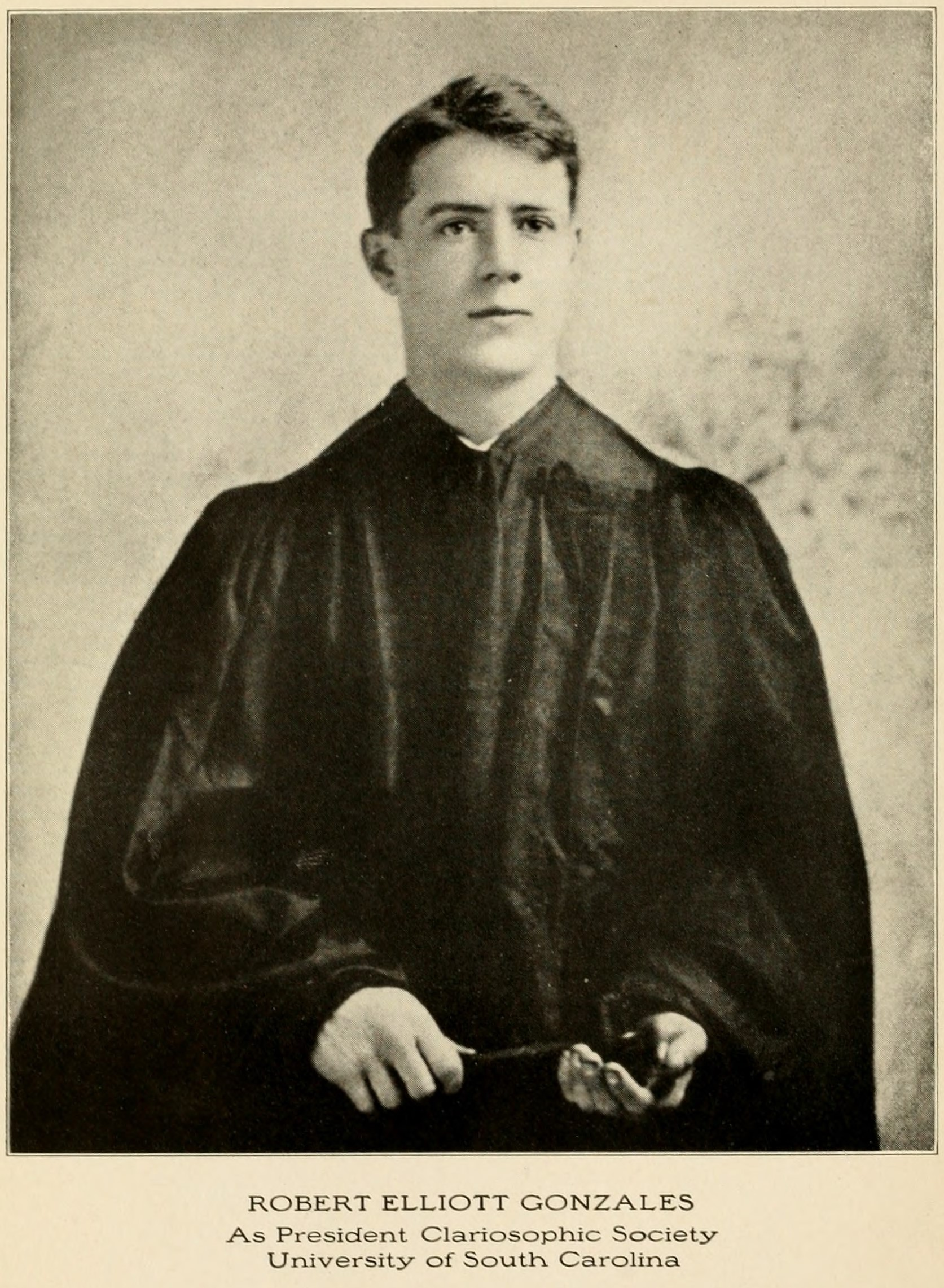
Robert Elliott Gonzales, President of the Clariosophic Society and founding editor of The Gamecock.

In the fall of 2014, the paper ended Friday production, producing instead a tabloid-format known as Weekender. In the fall of 2016, the paper moved two a twice-weekly production, Mondays and Thursdays, citing declining paper readership but increased digital readership. In fall 2018, the news organization's print edition moved to a once-weekly production with a circulation of 7,000.

Due to the COVID-19 pandemic, the newspaper stopped publishing weekly print editions and moved almost entirely online in March 2020. From August 2020 through April 2023, the newspaper published themed print editions once or twice a semester. In September 2023, the newspaper began publishing monthly print editions featuring a variety of timely content across the news, arts & culture, opinion, and sports sections.

== Content ==
The Daily Gamecock publishes all-original coverage of daily news, University of South Carolina sports, opinion, and the arts & culture of the USC campus and Columbia, SC area daily online.

It also produces special print editions six times per year, either highlighting top content from its website or dedicated to a designated theme.

== Awards and honors ==
The Gamecock has won many South Carolina Press Association awards and was a finalist for the National Pacemaker Awards for the Associated Collegiate Press in 1999. In October 2007, the Gamecock won the Sun Newspaper of the Year Award and ten other awards at the 2007 Southern University Newspaper Conference. The newspaper also won 31 SCPA awards in 2013. It also won first place in the "General Excellence" category (formerly "Best Overall") at the SCPA awards in 2009, 2010, 2011, 2012, 2013, 2014, 2020, and 2021.

In March 2006, The Daily Gamecock was recognized by the South Carolina Press Association for excellence for its coverage of Hurricane Katrina. Eight Gamecock staffers drove to hurricane-affected areas in Louisiana, Alabama, and Mississippi to report on the story.

The Daily Gamecock was awarded a "Top 10" national ranking by the Princeton Review in 2013 (#10). It was ranked No. 17 in 2011, the first time the newspaper appeared in the annual rankings.

== Operations ==
The newspaper has a staff of more than 50 students, both paid and volunteers. It is led by an editor-in-chief and a senior staff. The current editor-in-chief, Nat Campbell, was appointed to the role in December 2025 by the university's Board of Student Publications and Communications. The paper's senior staff are appointed by the editor-in-chief.
