= University of South Carolina =

University in Columbia, South Carolina

Coordinates: 33°59′51″N 81°01′31″W

- Former names: South Carolina College (1801–1865; 1882–1887; 1890–1905); University of South Carolina (1866–1877); South Carolina College of Agriculture and Mechanics (1880–1881)
- Motto: Emollit mores nec sinit esse feros (Latin)
- Motto in English: "Learning humanizes character and does not permit it to be cruel" (Ovid)
- Type: Public research university
- Established: December 19, 1801; 224 years ago
- Parent institution: University of South Carolina System
- Accreditation: SACS
- Academic affiliations: ORAU; URA; sea-grant; CUIBE
- Endowment: $1.15 billion (2025)
- President: Michael Amiridis
- Provost: Mary Anne Fitzpatrick
- Faculty: 1,604
- Students: >38,000 (2024) (Columbia); 52,633 (system-wide)
- Location: Columbia, South Carolina, United States
- Campus: 359 acres (145 ha); Midsize city
- Newspaper: The Daily Gamecock
- Colors: Garnet and black
- Nickname: Gamecocks
- Sporting affiliations: NCAA Division I FBS – SEC
- Mascot: Cocky
- Website: sc.edu

The University of South Carolina (USC, UofSC, SC, South Carolina, or Carolina) is a public research university in Columbia, South Carolina, United States. Founded in 1801 as South Carolina College, it is the flagship of the University of South Carolina System and the largest university in the state by enrollment. Its main campus is on over 359 acres (145 ha) in downtown Columbia, close to the South Carolina State House. The university is classified among "R1: Doctoral Universities with Highest Research Activity". It houses the largest collection of Robert Burns and Scottish literature materials outside Scotland and the world's largest Ernest Hemingway collection.

== History ==
=== Foundation and early history ===
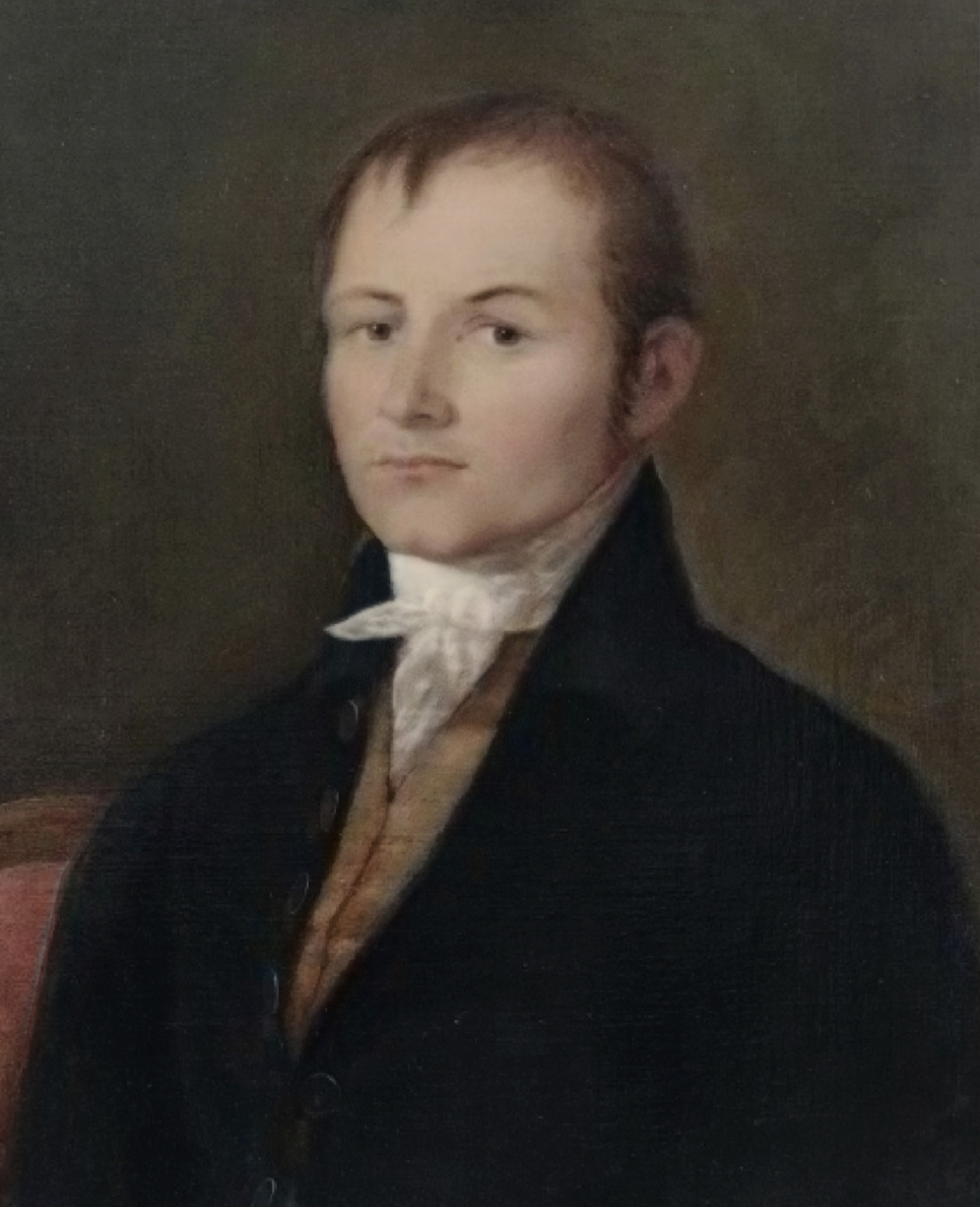
The university's first president, Reverend Jonathan Maxcy

The university was founded as South Carolina College on December 19, 1801, by an act of the South Carolina General Assembly initiated by Governor John Drayton in an effort to promote harmony between the Lowcountry and the Backcountry. On January 10, 1805, having an initial enrollment of nine students, the college commenced classes with a traditional classical curriculum. The first president was the Baptist minister and theologian Reverend Jonathan Maxcy. He was an alumnus of Brown University, with an honorary degree from Harvard University. Before coming to the college, Maxcy had served as the second president of Brown and the third president of Union College. Maxcy's tenure lasted from 1804 through 1820.

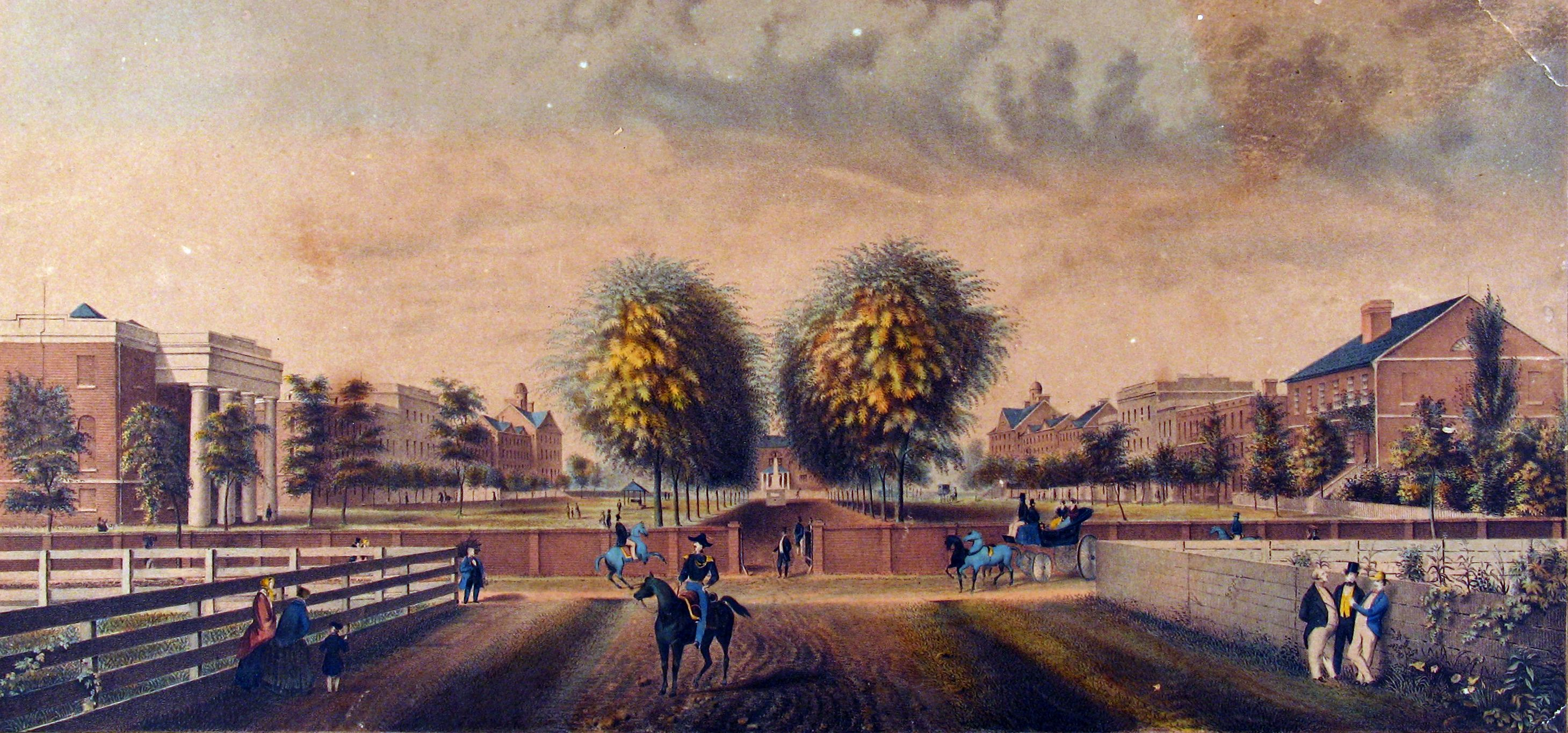
South Carolina College as it appeared in 1850, looking from College Street

When South Carolina College opened its doors in 1805, the building now known as Rutledge College was the only building on campus. Located one block southeast of the State Capitol, it served as an administrative office, academic building, residence hall, and chapel. However, the master plan for the original campus called for a total of eleven buildings, all facing a large lush gathering area. In 1807, the original President's House was the next building to be erected. The building now known as DeSaussure College followed shortly thereafter, and the remaining eight buildings were constructed over the next several decades. When completed, all eleven buildings formed a U-shape open to Sumter Street. This modified quadrangle became known as the Horseshoe.

As with other southern universities in the antebellum period, the most important organizations for students were the two literary societies, the Clariosophic Society and the Euphradian Society. These two societies, which arose from a split in an earlier literary society known as the Philomathic, grew to encapsulate the majority of the student body from the 1820s onward.

The college became a symbol of the South in the postbellum period as its graduates were on the forefront of secession from the Union. With the generous support of the General Assembly, South Carolina College acquired a reputation as the leading institution of the South and attracted several noteworthy scholars, including Francis Lieber, Thomas Cooper, and Joseph LeConte.

Slavery and slave labor played a fundamental role in the foundation and construction of the University of South Carolina. Many of the primary buildings in the central heart of campus, known today as the horseshoe, were built not only by slave labor but also of slave-made brick. Slave labor played a large role in the maintenance operational duties of early campus activities. This includes maintenance, cleaning of student tenements and faculty duplexes, and the preparation of meals.

=== Civil War ===
There were 72 students at the college in January 1862 and the college functioned until a call by the Confederate government for South Carolina to fill its quota of 18,000 soldiers. A system of conscription began on March 20 for all men between the ages of 18 and 45, but many students volunteered. With the depletion of students, professors issued a notice that the college would open to those under 18 years old. Nine students showed up for class.

=== Reconstruction ===
The University Act of 1869 during the Reconstruction era reorganized the university and provided it with generous financial support. An amendment was added to the act by W. J. Whipper, a black representative from Beaufort, that would prevent racial discrimination from the admissions policy of the university. The legislature further proved its seriousness towards racial equality by electing two black trustees, Benjamin A. Boseman (misspelled as "Bozeman" in the bill) and Francis Lewis Cardozo, to the governing board of the university on March 9, 1869. A normal school was established by the legislature on the campus of the university as well as a preparatory school for black students, since most former slaves were ill-prepared for academic work. In addition, to encourage enrollment by blacks, tuition and other fees were abolished. On October 7, 1873, Henry E. Hayne, the Secretary of State of South Carolina, became the first black student when he registered for the fall session in the medical college of the university. Many white students and faculty left the school in protest, and Hayne's registration became national news. Two years later, the majority of students at the university were black, and enrolled students included Richard T. Greener, T. McCants Stewart, William D. Crum, William Sinclair, and Alonzo Townsend. Opponents of desegregation labeled the university as "the radical university," blaming its changes on being occupied by outsiders with radical ideas. This period of desegregation lasted for four years.

=== Post-Reconstruction (Jim Crow era) ===
When Reconstruction ended in 1877, South Carolina's legislature became all-white again. That year, South Carolina state leaders closed the university. It was reopened in 1880 as a white only agricultural college. Greener, the university's first black professor, had to leave.

In 1893, South Carolina's legislature required that the university let women enroll, although the university did not yet allow women to live on campus. Frances Guignard Gibbes was admitted in 1895, and Mattie Jean Adams became the first female graduate in 1898. By the 1920s, women made up a quarter of the student body, and in 1924, they were allowed to live in campus dormitories. In the spring of 1924, Irene Dillard Elliott became the first dean of women at USC. Along with being a dean, Elliot worked as a full-time English professor. During this time, she strived to smooth over the transition USC took to become coeducational.

=== Civil rights era ===
Black students did not return to the University of South Carolina until 1963, when Henrie Monteith, Robert Anderson, and James Solomon enrolled. The university was one of the last large public universities to desegregate. Students who integrated the university feared violence and were excluded from many aspects of social life and extra-curriculars. On campus, the integration process proceeded peacefully, just not supportively. Monteith became the university's first post-Reconstruction black graduate and first black female graduate in 1965.

=== Previous institution names ===
- Chartered as South Carolina College on December 19, 1801
- Chartered as the University of South Carolina on January 10, 1866
- Chartered as South Carolina College of Agriculture and Mechanics on October 3, 1880
- Chartered as South Carolina College in 1882
- Chartered as the University of South Carolina on May 9, 1888
- Chartered as South Carolina College on April 21, 1890
- Chartered as the University of South Carolina on February 17, 1906

== Campus ==
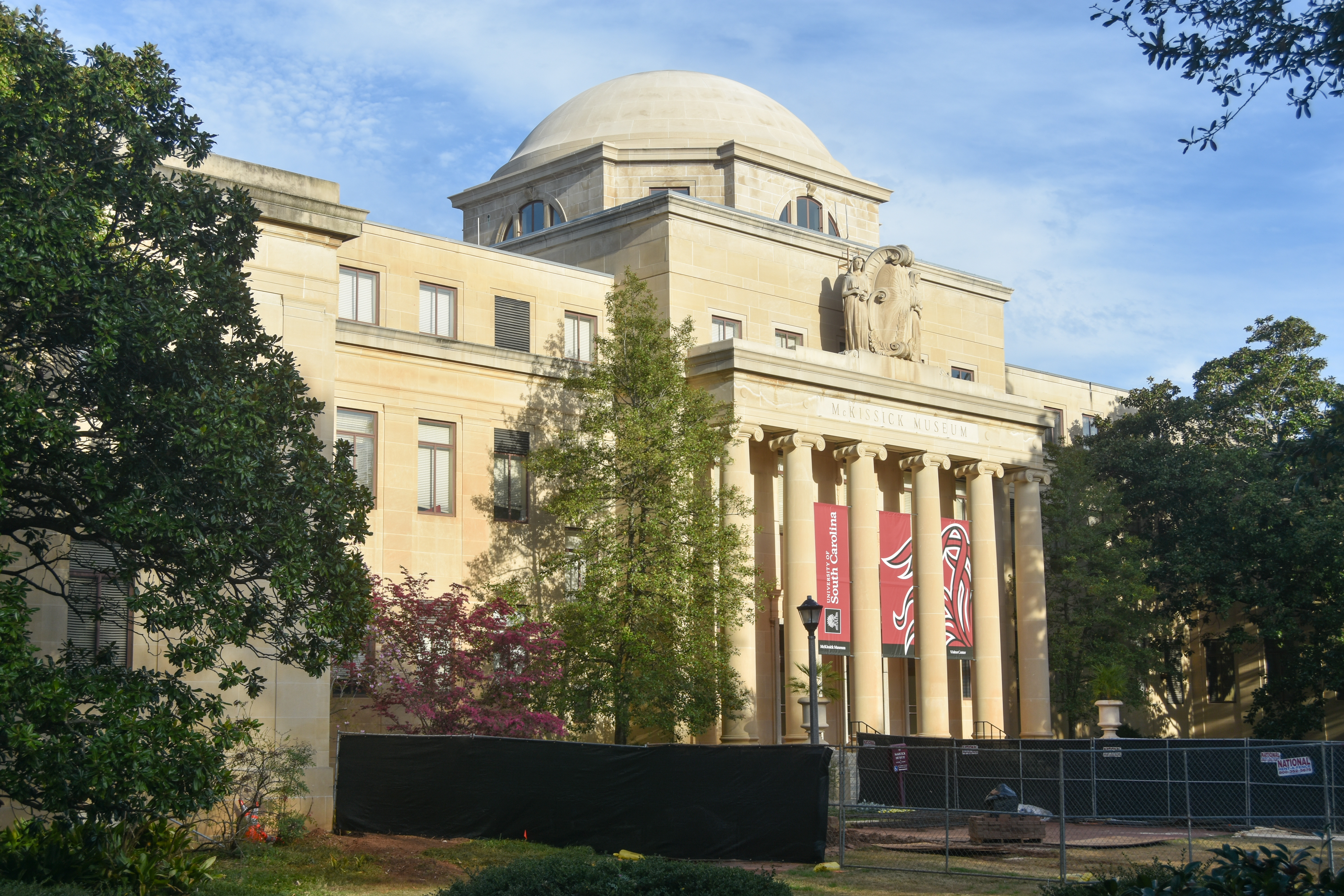
The McKissick Museum sits prominently at the head of the USC Horseshoe.

The Horseshoe is listed on the National Register of Historic Places, and most of its buildings reflect the federal style of architecture in vogue in the early days of the nation. Among them is the South Caroliniana Library, which was designed by Robert Mills and is the first freestanding academic library in the United States.

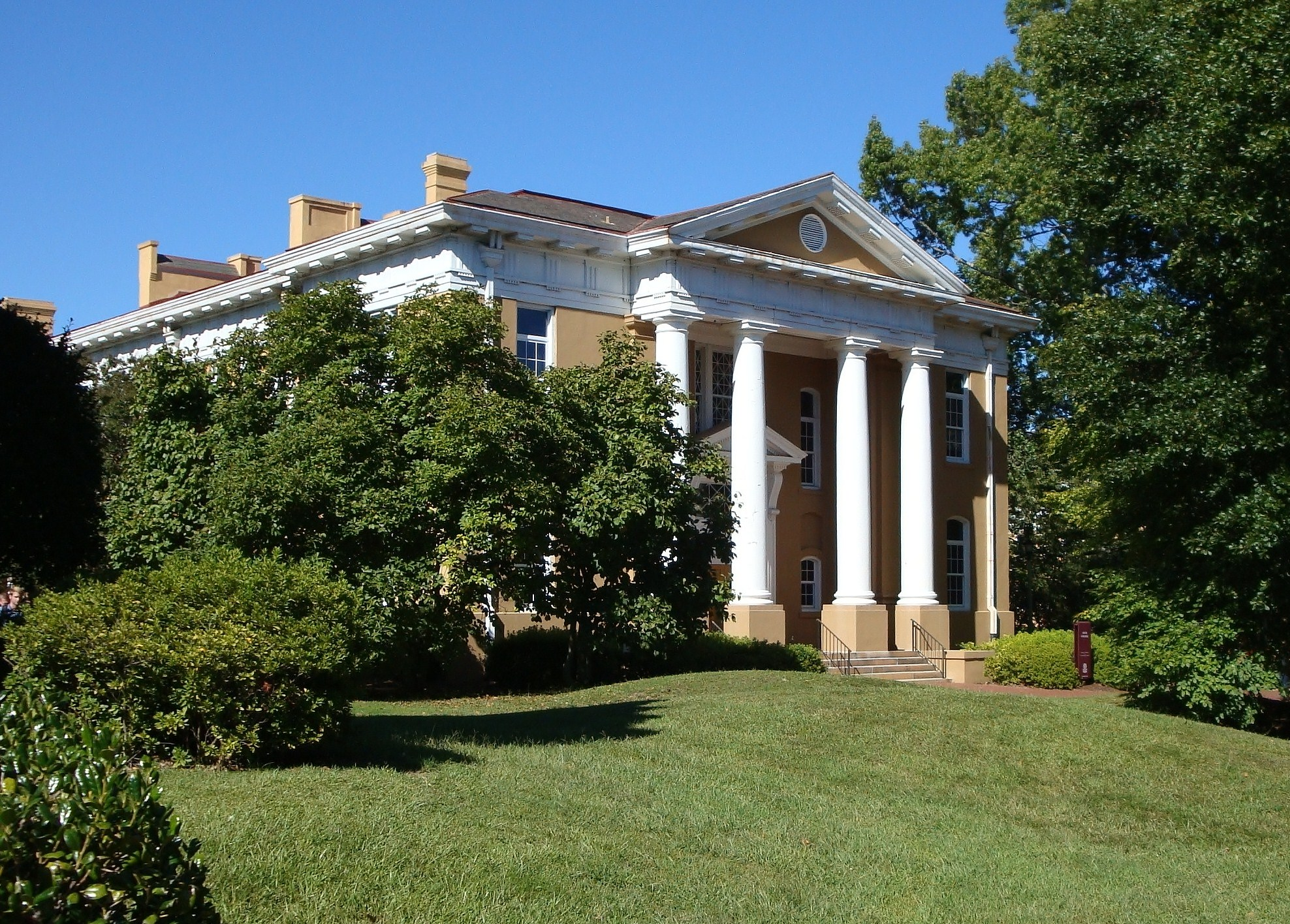
Built in 1909, Davis College was the university's first new building after the Civil War. It currently houses the School of Library and Information Science.

Over the years the 11 original buildings on the Horseshoe survived a fire, an earthquake, and the Civil War, but in 1939 McKissick Museum replaced the original President's House. The President's House would eventually return to the Horseshoe after extensive remodeling of one of its original buildings, which was dedicated as such in 1952.

During the 20th century: the campus began to spread out dramatically from the Horseshoe. Today it includes the student union, 24 residence halls, numerous academic buildings, Longstreet Theatre, the Koger Center for the Arts, the Carolina Coliseum, the Colonial Life Arena, Carolina Stadium, and various facilities for Olympic sports. (Williams-Brice Stadium is located approximately one mile off campus.) Recent additions to the campus are the Strom Thurmond Wellness and Fitness Center, the Greek Village, the Green Quad, the Honors Residence Hall, the Public Health Research Center, the Graduate Columbia hotel, the Colonial Life Arena and Carolina Stadium. In 2017, a new School of Law building opened on Senate Street, and the Darla Moore School of Business opened its new home at the corner of Assembly and Greene in 2014.

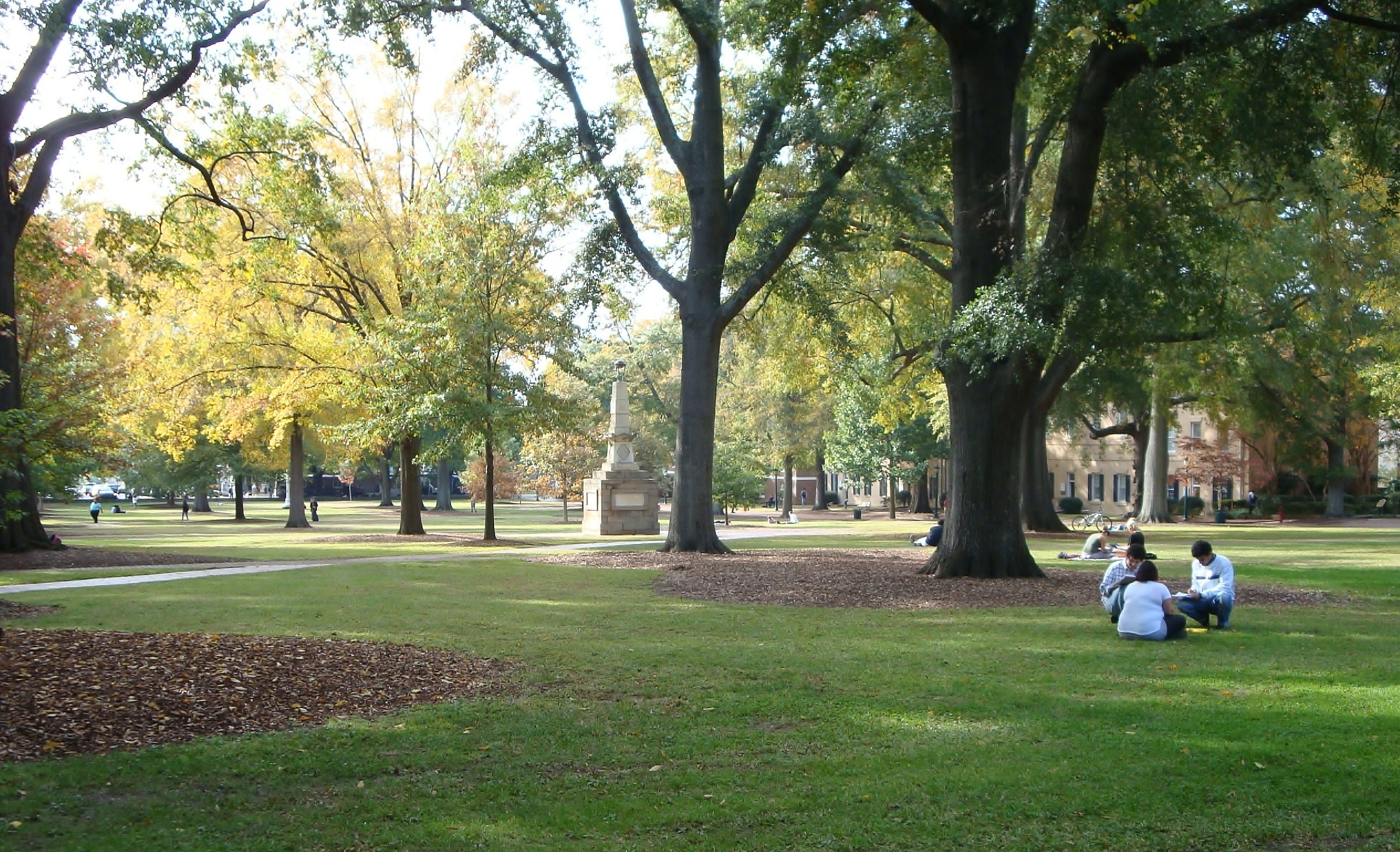
The University of South Carolina's historic Horseshoe, on which the university's first building was built in 1805

The "Carolina Cab" offers students free rides from Five Points to their homes within 5 miles (8 km) of campus on weekends.

== Academics ==
=== Colleges and schools ===
- McCausland College of Arts and Sciences
- Darla Moore School of Business
- College of Education
- Molinaroli College of Engineering and Computing
- Graduate School
- College of Hospitality, Retail, and Sport Management
- College of Information and Communications
- Joseph F. Rice School of Law
- School of Medicine–Columbia
- School of Medicine–Greenville
- School of Music
- College of Nursing
- College of Pharmacy
- Arnold School of Public Health
- College of Social Work
- South Carolina Honors College

=== Undergraduate admissions ===
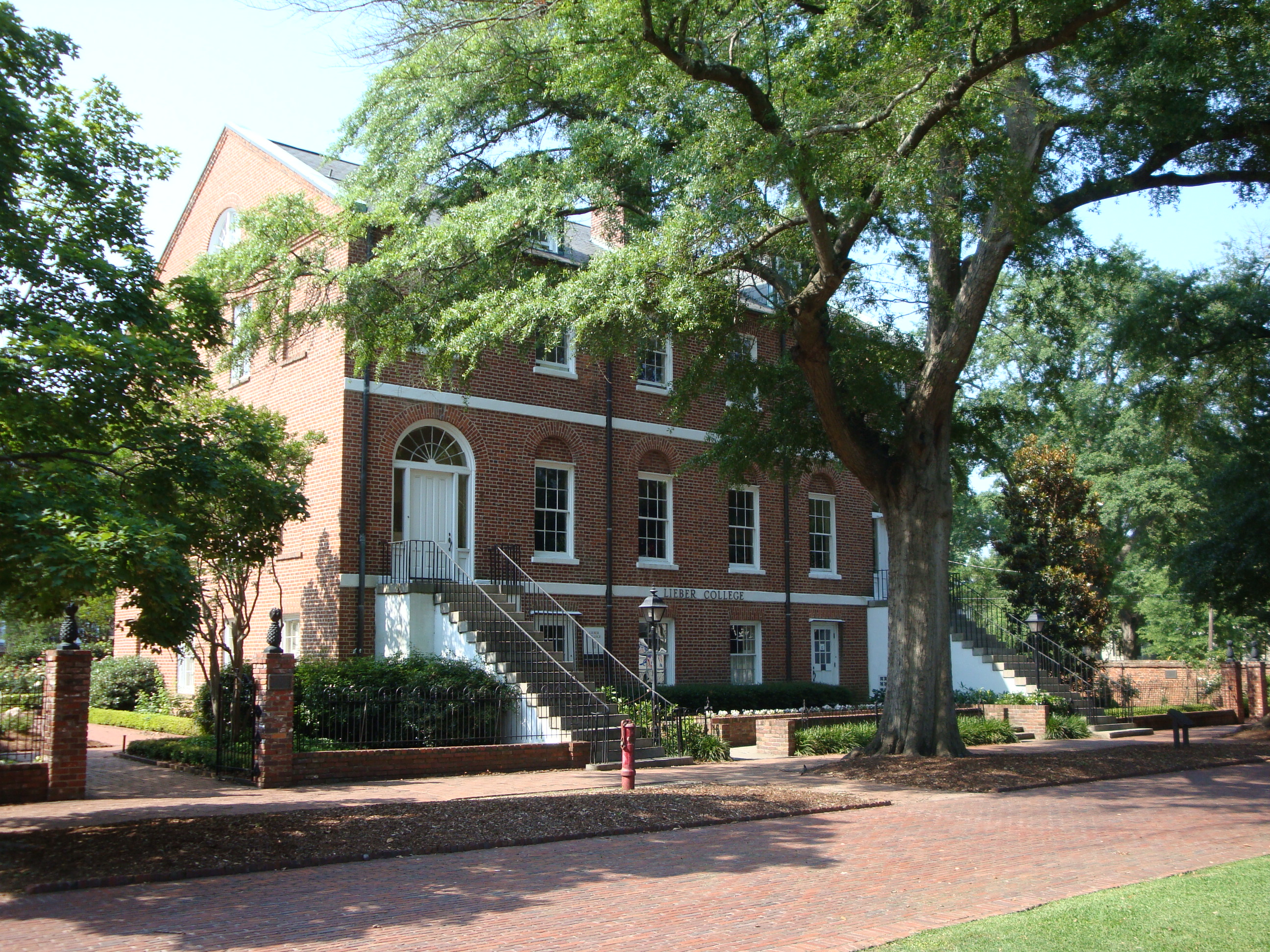
Lieber College, originally constructed in 1837, is the office of undergraduate admissions at the University of South Carolina and is listed in the National Register of Historic Places.

Undergraduate admissions are classified as more selective. For the freshman enrollment of 2022, half the class had SAT scores between 1150 and 1360, or ACT scores between 26 and 31.

=== South Carolina Honors College ===
Founded in 1978, the South Carolina Honors College offers support to academically gifted undergraduate students. After gaining acceptance to the University of South Carolina, students must apply separately to the Honors College and demonstrate significant academic achievement. In 2019, entering freshmen had an average weighted GPA of 4.71 and a midrange SAT score (critical reading and math) of 1460–1530.

=== Rankings ===
Academic rankings

National
- Forbes: 161
- U.S. News & World Report: 121
- Washington Monthly: 153
- WSJ/College Pulse: 275

Global
- ARWU: 401–500
- QS: =628
- THE: 401–500
- U.S. News & World Report: 346

National Program Rankings
Program	Ranking
Biological Sciences	159
Business	62
Chemistry	88
Clinical Psychology	80
Computer Science	111
Criminology	22
Earth Sciences	90
Economics	83
Education	78
Engineering	102
English	85
Fine Arts	152
Health Care Management	39
History	63
Law	96
Library Science & Information Studies	18
Mathematics	86
Medical Schools-Primary Care	90
Medical Schools-Research	91
Nursing-Anesthesia	65
Pharmacy	40
Physical Therapy	42
Physics	119
Political Science	72
Psychology	112
Public Affairs	101
Public Health	23
Rehabilitation Counseling	47
Social Work	51
Sociology	75
Speech-Language Pathology	25
Statistics	74

== Research ==
The University of South Carolina is classified as a research institution of "very high research activity". The university was awarded $309 million in sponsored awards during the 2024 fiscal year, a 27 percent increase in research funding from the previous year.

During his tenure as president of the University of South Carolina, John Palms articulated a "Cathedrals of Excellence" budgeting philosophy. Palms advocated the money from fundraising be channeled into the school's best programs, rather than spread the funds evenly. The strategy would pay off in the long term when these programs became nationally prominent, making a name for the University of South Carolina and attracting grant money. His primary goal was for the university to be admitted to the Association of American Universities – an association of the leading 62 research universities in the United States and Canada.

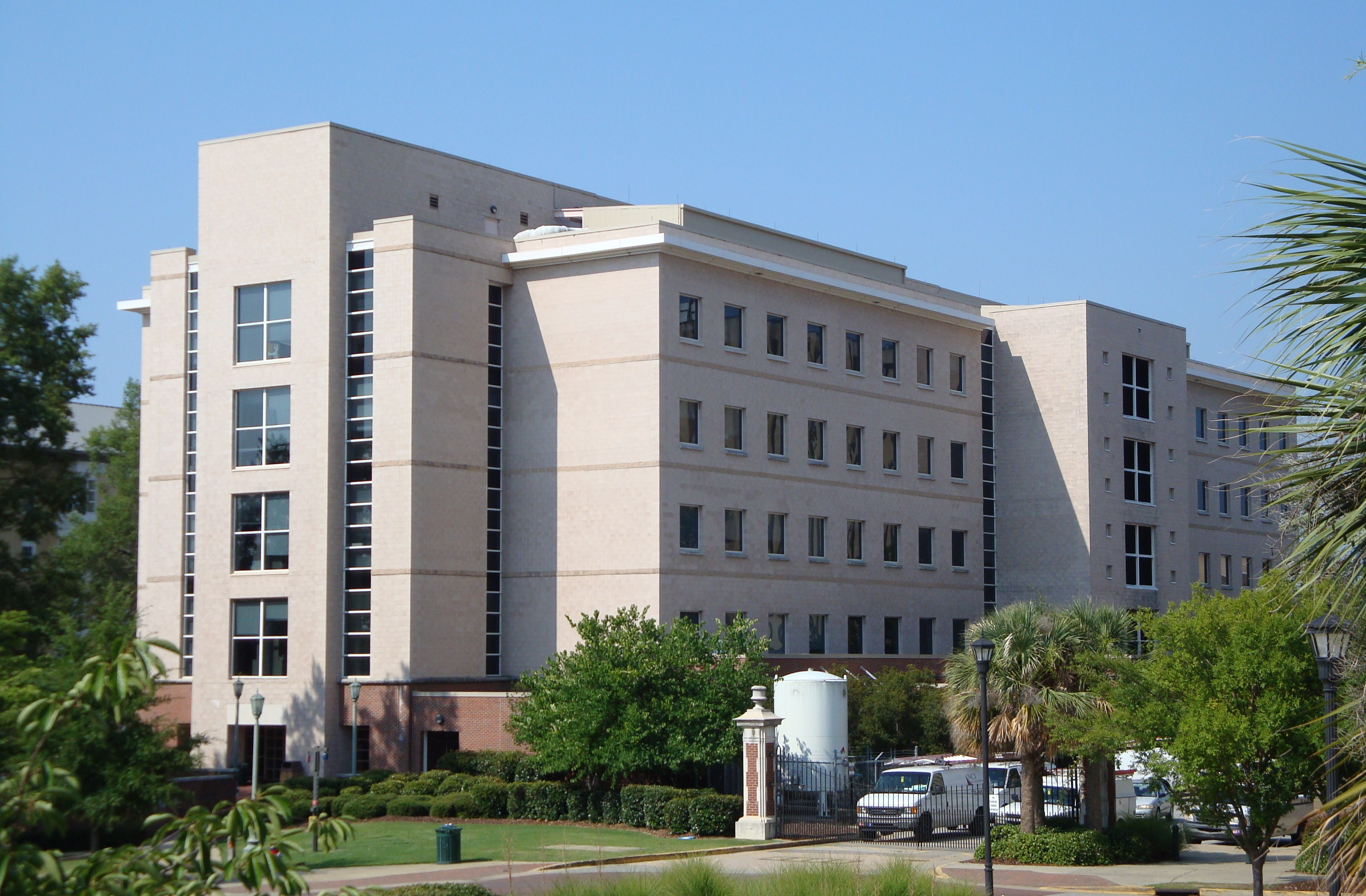
Completed in May 2000, the Science Research Center is home to the Department of Chemistry and Biochemistry.

Former President Andrew Sorensen raised even larger sums for research, including a $300 million grant for colorectal cancer. In the spirit of Palms' budget, the board of directors moved to transform university land on Assembly Street into an "innovation district" called Innovista that will develop four areas: biomedicine, nanotechnology, environmental science and alternative fuels.

In May 2009, the University of South Carolina was selected by the U.S. Department of Energy as one of 31 universities nationwide to house an Energy Frontier Research Center that is expected to bring $12.5 million in federal funding, the largest single award in the university's history, to the College of Engineering and Computing. President Pastides commented on the grant, "This award solidifies the university's position as a leader in alternative-fuel research."

The University of South Carolina is a member of the SEC Academic Consortium. Now renamed the SECU, the initiative was a collaborative endeavor designed to promote research, scholarship and achievement amongst the member universities in the Southeastern conference. The SECU bolsters collaborative academic endeavors of Southeastern Conference universities. Its goals include highlighting the endeavors and achievements of SEC faculty, students and its universities and advancing the academic reputation of SEC universities.

== Student life ==
Undergraduate demographics as of fall 2023
Race and ethnicity	Total
White	73%
Black	9%
Hispanic	6%
Asian	4%
Two or more races	4%
International student	2%
Unknown	1%
Economic diversity
Low-income (Note: The percentage of students who received an income-based federal Pell grant intended for low-income students.)	19%
Affluent (Note: The percentage of students who are a part of the American middle class at the bare minimum.)	81%

=== Demographics ===
Over 34,500 students attend the Columbia campus of the University of South Carolina, coming from all 46 South Carolina counties. In addition, students from all 50 states and more than 100 foreign countries are represented here. (Almost 16,000 students study at the regional campuses of the University of South Carolina System.)

=== Housing ===
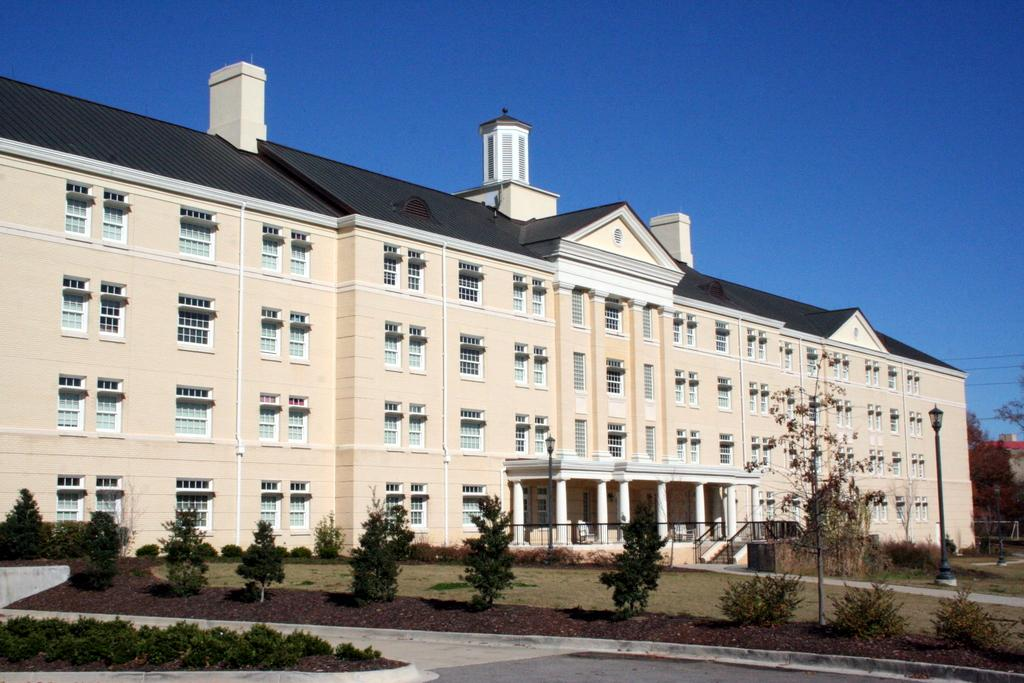
West Quad, also called the "Green Quad", became the University of South Carolina's first LEED certified residence hall when it opened in 2004.

University Housing provides over 6,200 on-campus housing units. Rent includes all utilities. Undergraduates may choose housing in a specific "living and learning community". The concept is to create a better social and learning environment by housing students with similar academic or career interests together.

In the fall of 2004, the $29 million West Quad (now Green Quad) opened and became one of only four in the world to be certified by the U.S. Green Building Council's Leadership in Energy and Environmental Design (LEED) program. The 172,000-square-foot (16,000 m^{2}) complex includes three four-story buildings.

Since campus academic enrollment exceeds the capacity of on-campus housing, the university is adding more residence halls, most of which will be suite-style. As a result, some students live in popular off-campus housing.

=== Student government ===
The university's student government is composed of the executive, judicial, and legislative branches. A 50-member Student Senate is led by the student body speaker of the Senate. The Student Senate enacts referendums, resolutions, and bills to enhance the student body in non-academic fields, maintains a budget for student life projects, confirms nominations for cabinet positions, and makes recommendations for change within the university. Their work is arranged according to the Student Government Constitution, a document written and adopted with the inception of student government and overseen by the president of the University of South Carolina and the university's board of trustees.

=== Media ===
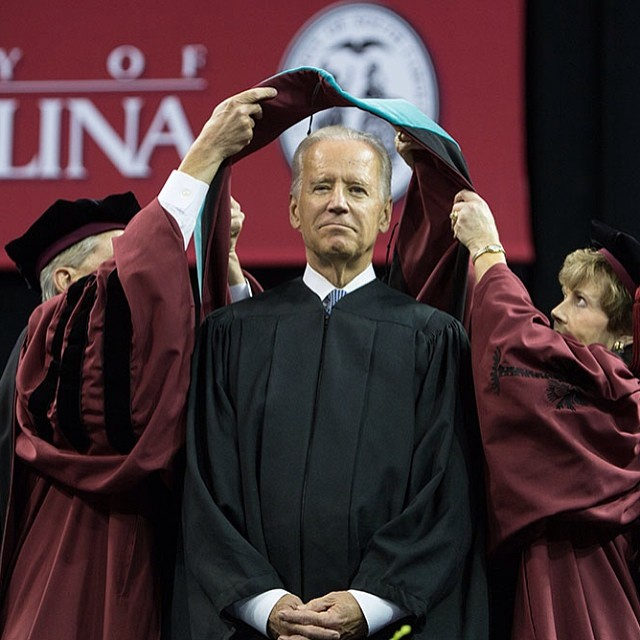
Vice President Joe Biden receives honorary doctorate, 2014, and delivers the commencement address.

The Daily Gamecock is an editorially independent, daily student newspaper founded in 1908. It has a readership of more than 30,000 and is distributed across the University of South Carolina System.

The student run radio station, WUSC, began broadcasting on the AM dial in 1947. In January 1977 WUSC began broadcasting on the FM dial, and in 1982 the station found its current home at 90.5 FM. Since June 2006, WUSC is broadcasting in HD radio.

Students publish a literary magazine, Garnet & Black, which was formed in 1994 as a consolidation of the university's former yearbook and its literary magazine. It is published four times a year and is free.

The University of South Carolina established its first television station in the Fall 2006, Student Government Television (SGTV). It was funded by Student Government until April 2007 when Student Government released SGTV to the Department of Student Media, which also operates The Daily Gamecock, Garnet & Black Magazine and WUSC-FM. It was then that the station changed its name to it current name, Student Gamecock Television (SGTV).

=== Fraternities and sororities ===
About 22% of undergraduate men and 34% of undergraduate women participate in fraternities and sororities. These Greek letter organizations are governed by an internal body, the Greek Council. There are two separate councils, one for males and another for females. Many of the fraternities and sororities have large, mostly Greek Revival style mansions; Lining Lincoln Street, Gadsden Street, and Mark Buyck Way are the houses referred to as the Greek Village.

=== Recreation ===
Students tend to socialize off campus in Five Points and the Congaree Vista. Both of these areas are within walking distance of campus and offer restaurants, bars, cafés, and a variety of local entertainment.

Lake Murray and the three rivers (Saluda River, Broad River, and Congaree River) around Columbia offer students many recreational activities. The South Carolina coast—Charleston, SC, Myrtle Beach, Hilton Head—is only a 1.5- to 2-hour drive for additional recreational activities.

== Athletics ==
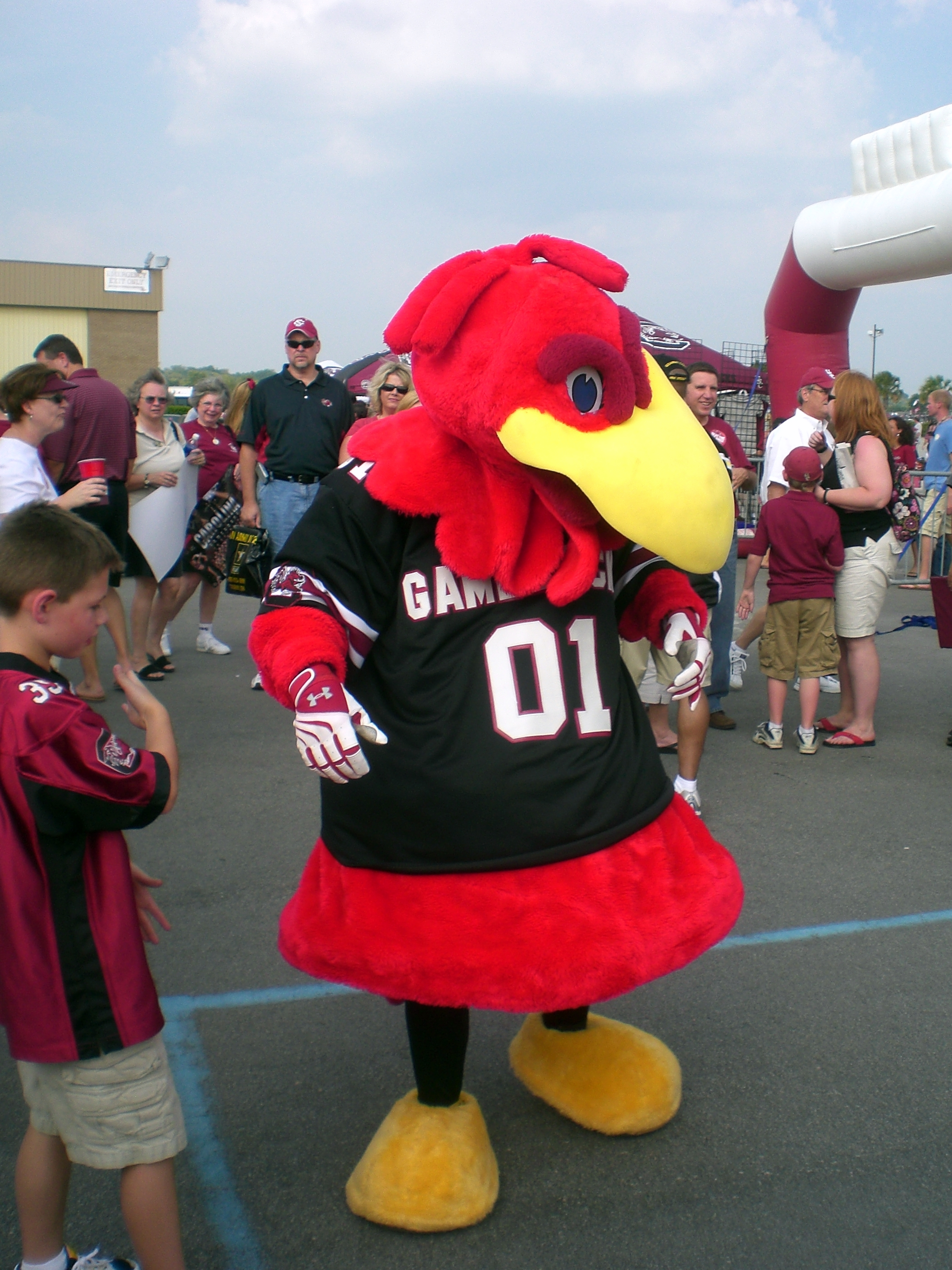
The university's mascot, Cocky, entertaining Gamecock fans at Gamecock Village prior to game vs. LousLaf in 2007

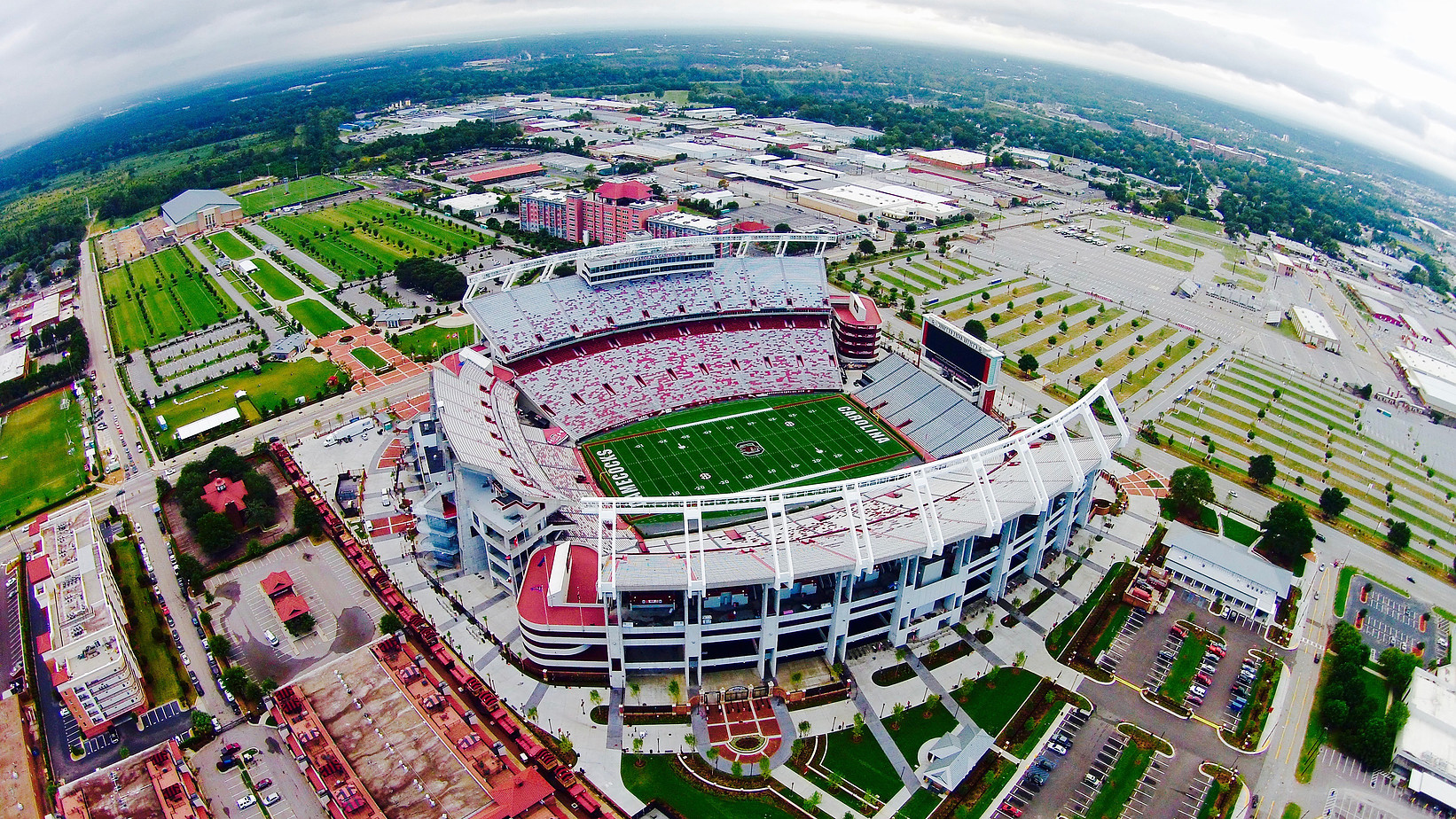
Williams-Brice Stadium (est. 1930, renovated 1996)

The university offers club, intramural, and varsity sports. Its 19 varsity sports teams compete in the Southeastern Conference (except for men's soccer which competes in the Sun Belt Conference and women's sand volleyball which competes as an independent) and are known as the Gamecocks.

=== Fight song ===
The university's band director James Pritchard obtained a band arrangement of the Elmer Bernstein-penned song "Step to the Rear" from the Broadway musical How Now, Dow Jones in 1968 and the marching band played the song at the first game of the 1968 season. It caught the ear of Coach Paul Dietzel who contacted Pritchard about making it the official fight song of the university to replace the original "Carolina Fight Song" (or "Carolina Let Your Voices Ring," now called the "Old Fight Song"). Dietzel wrote the lyrics for the song, but asked that he remain anonymous because knowledge that the football coach wrote the lyrics might render it unacceptable to the basketball program. The song was officially introduced on November 16, 1968, prior to the football game against Virginia Tech and has been the fight song since the fall of 1969.

=== Alma mater ===
The Gamecock reported in its March 1911 issue that very little progress had been made on the alma mater for the university despite a reward of $50 by the faculty. English professor, George A. Wauchope, took it upon himself and wrote the lyrics for the alma mater in 1911 set to the tune "Flow Gently, Sweet Afton" by Robert Burns. Other songs were written and sung, but Wauchope's song proved to be the most popular, and it was adopted by the university in 1912.

The tradition has developed that alumni raise their right hand as though raising a cup for the phrase "Here's a Health, Carolina" as if offering a toast.

== Notable alumni ==
As of 2017, the university reported having over 300,000 living alumni.

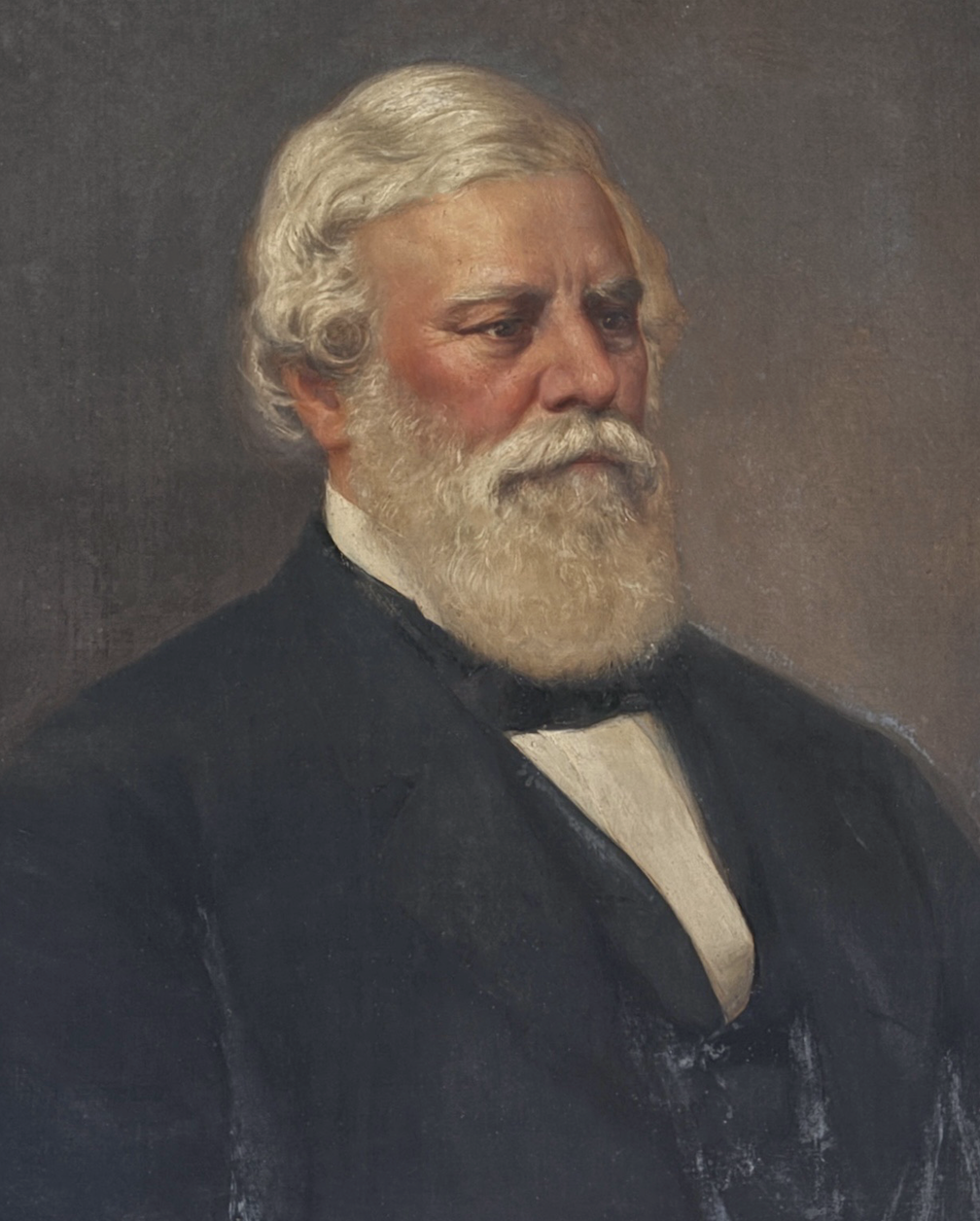
William Aiken, Jr., 1825, governor of South Carolina, United States representative, and Southern Unionist

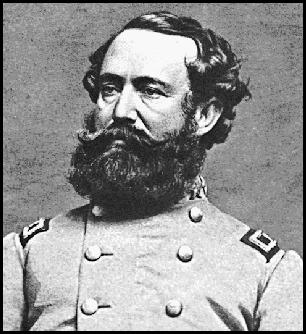
Wade Hampton III, 1836, governor of South Carolina, United States senator, and Confederate general

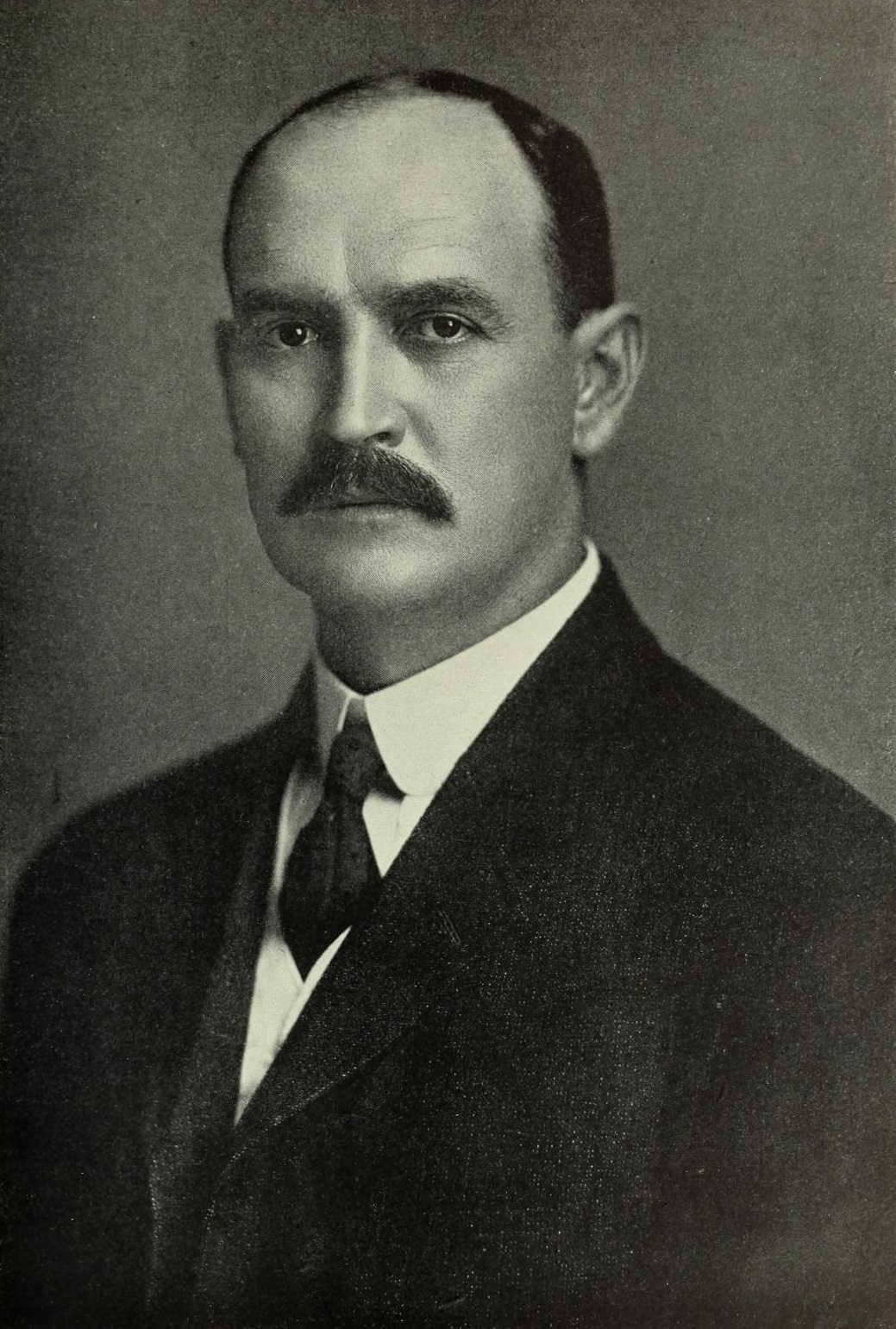
David F. Houston, BA 1887, 48th United States secretary of the treasury, chancellor of Washington University in St. Louis, president of the University of Texas at Austin, vice president of AT&T

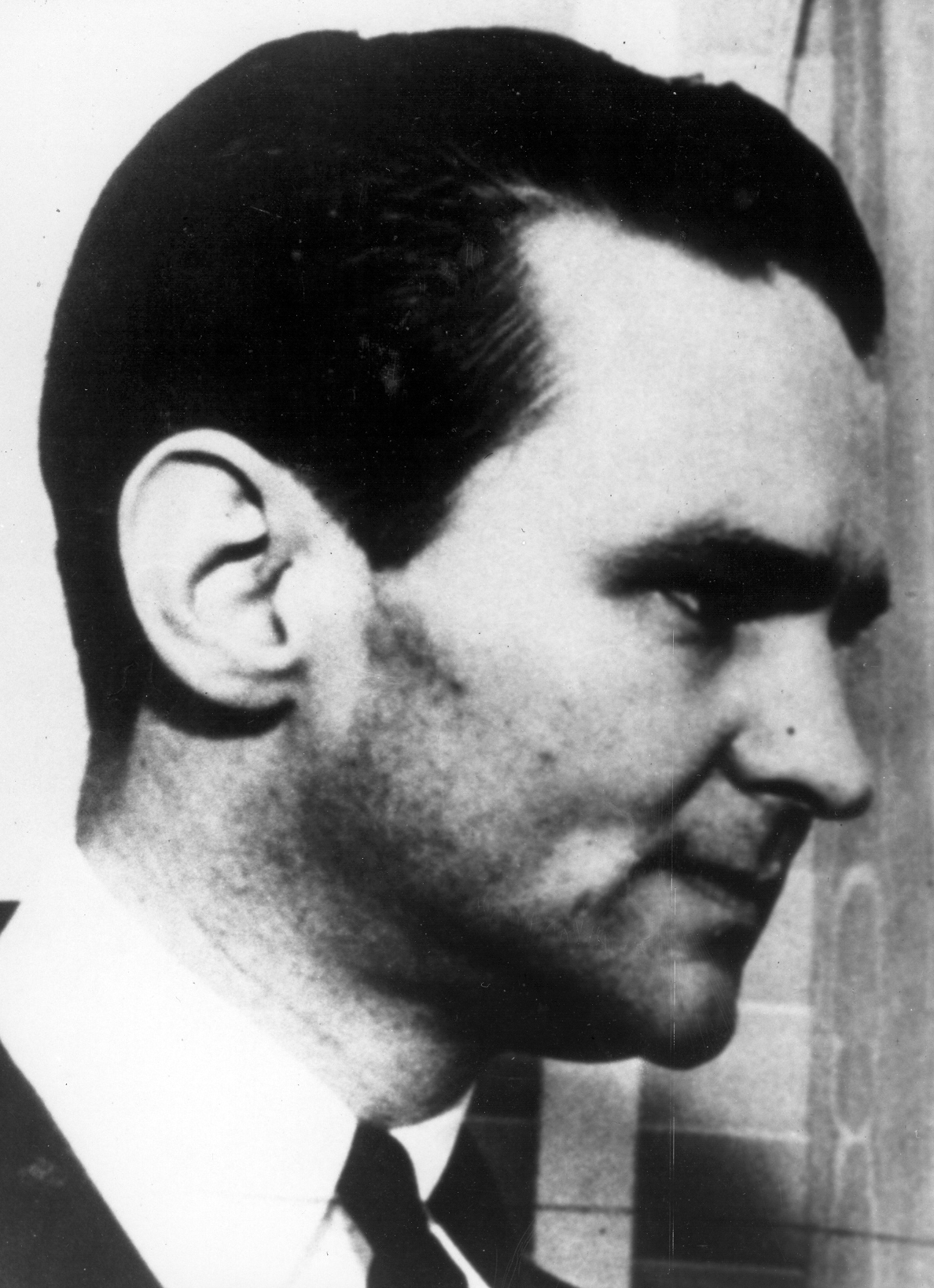
Melvin Purvis, JD 1922, FBI agent instrumental in capturing bank robbers John Dillinger and Pretty Boy Floyd in 1934

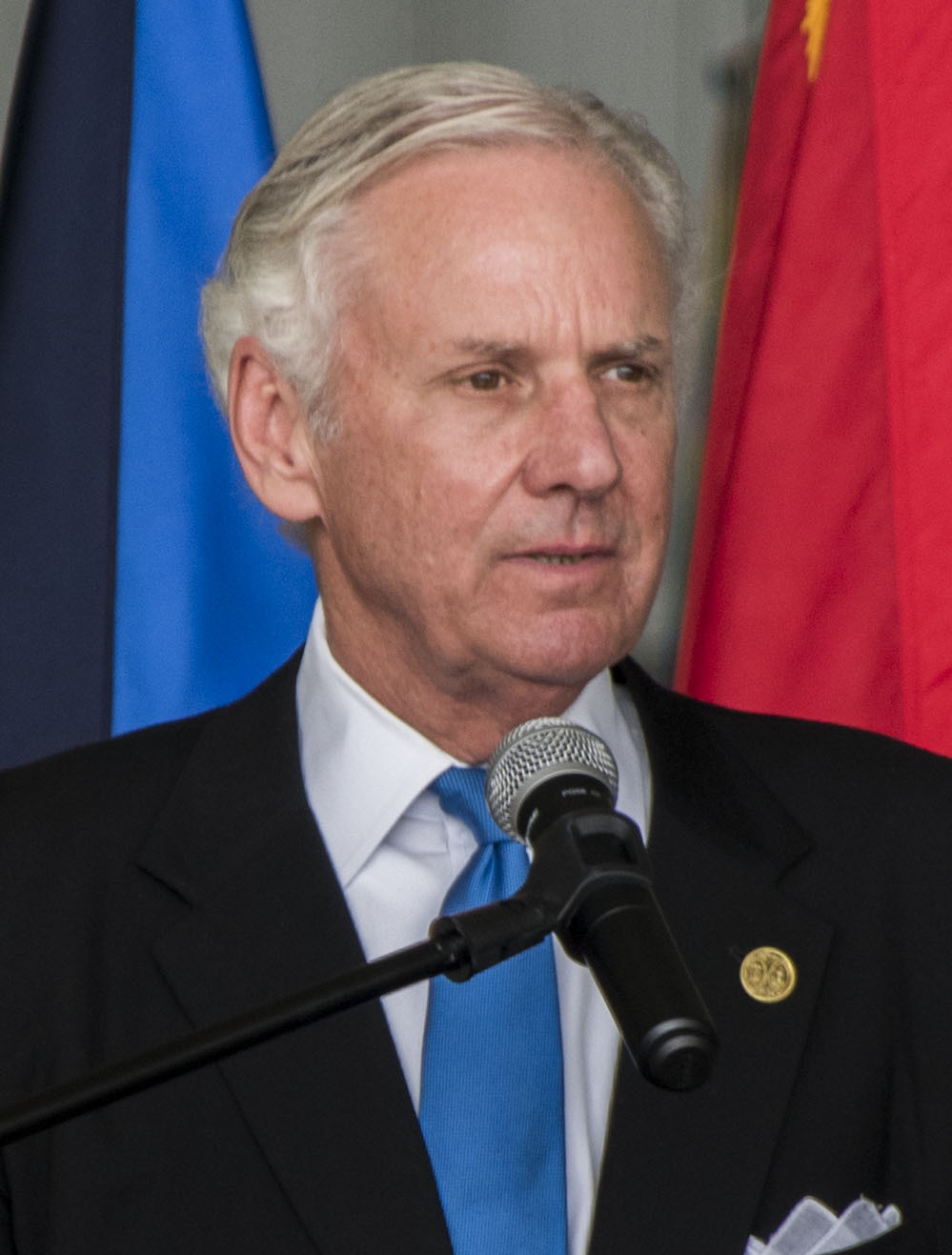
Henry McMaster, BA 1969, JD 1973, current governor of South Carolina

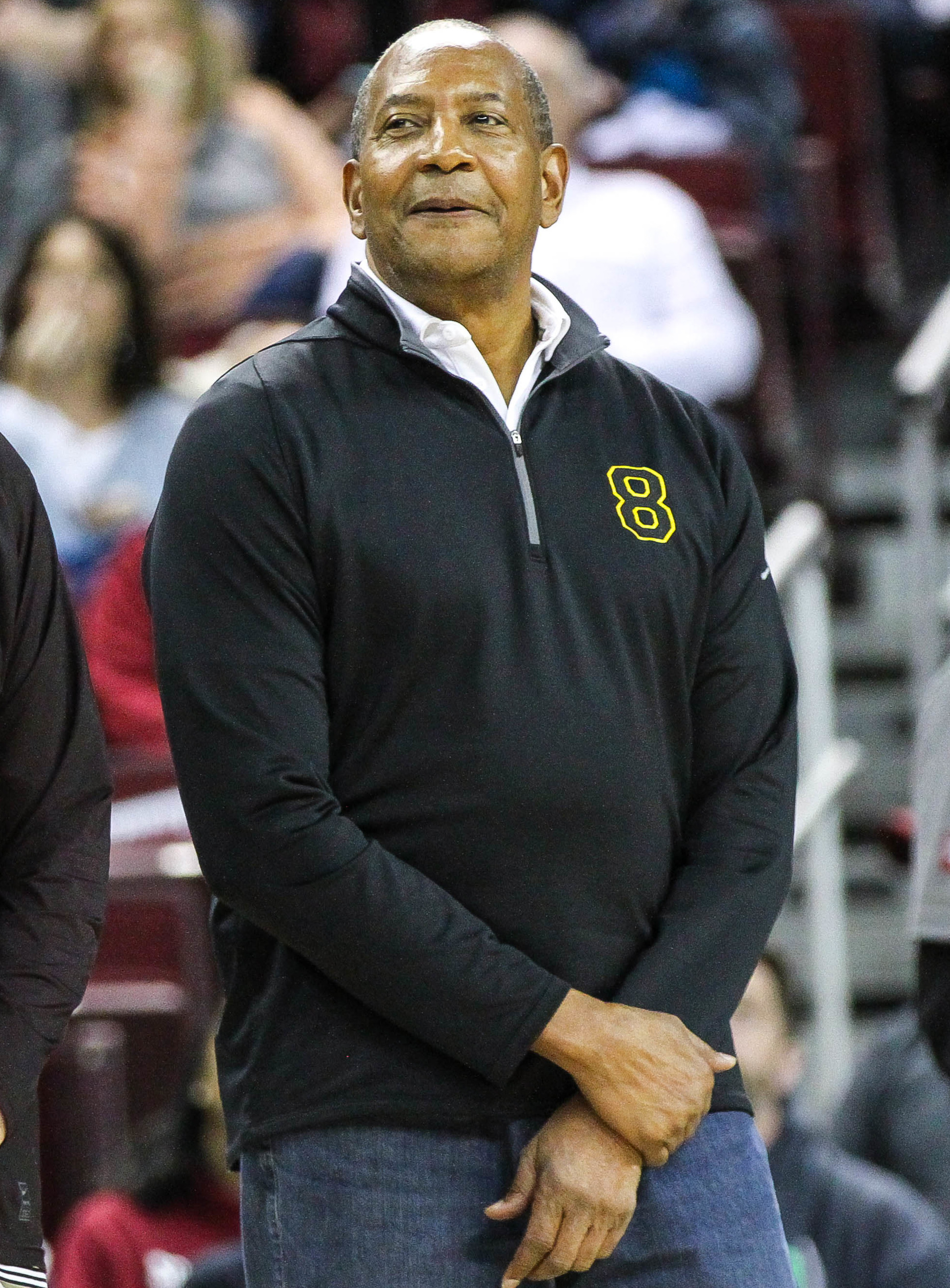
Alex English, BA 1976, 8-time NBA all-star

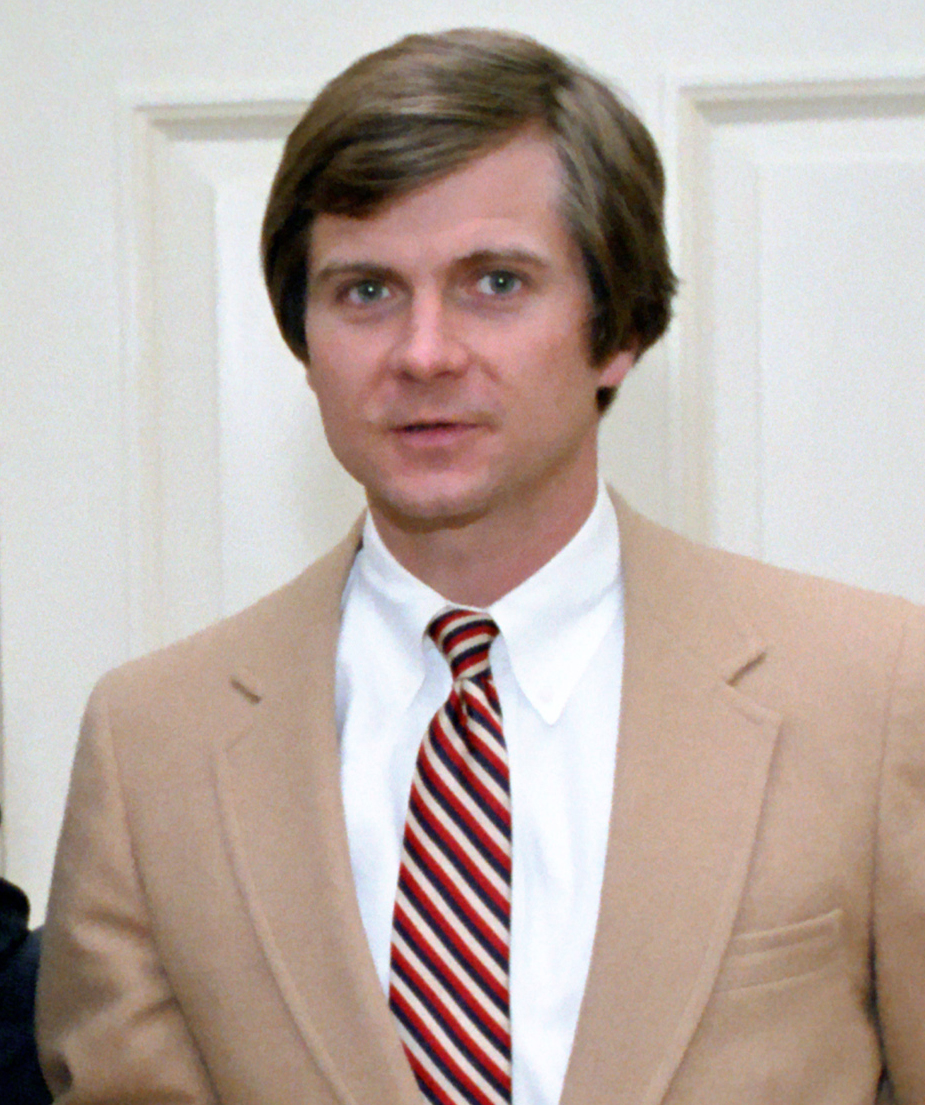
Lee Atwater, MA 1977, chair of the Republican National Committee

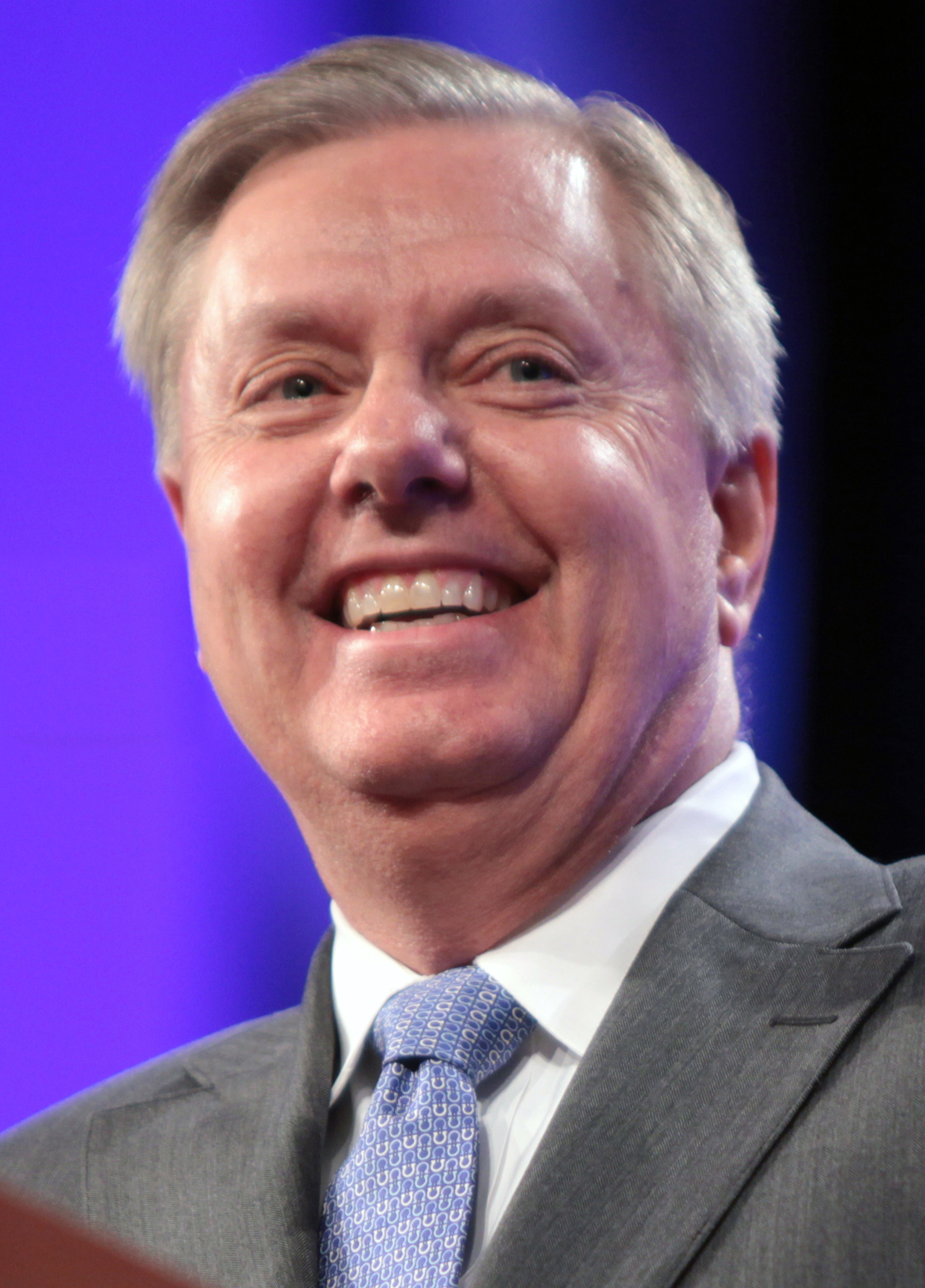
Lindsey Graham, BA 1977, JD 1981, United States senator from South Carolina

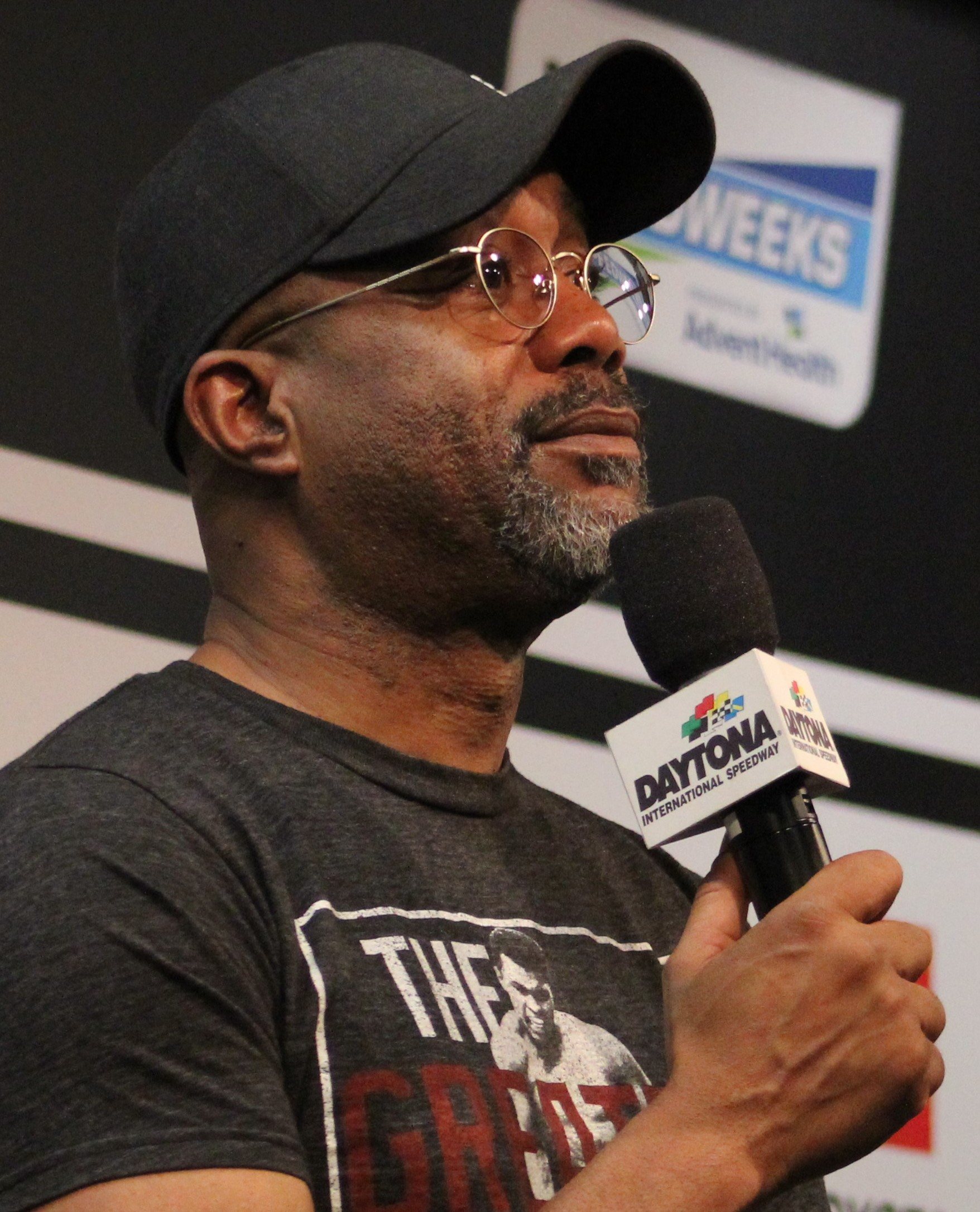
Darius Rucker, musician and lead vocalist of Hootie & the Blowfish

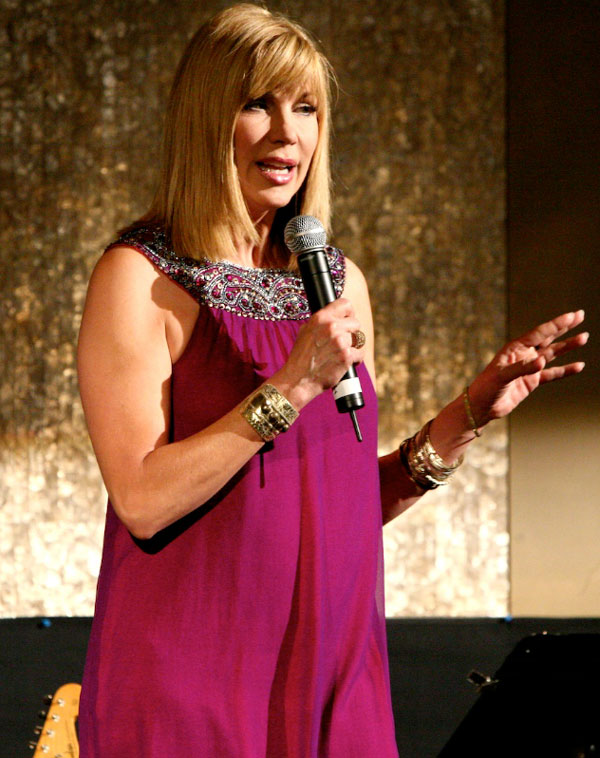
Leeza Gibbons, BA 1979, TV host, seven-time Emmy Award nominee, reporter for Entertainment Tonight

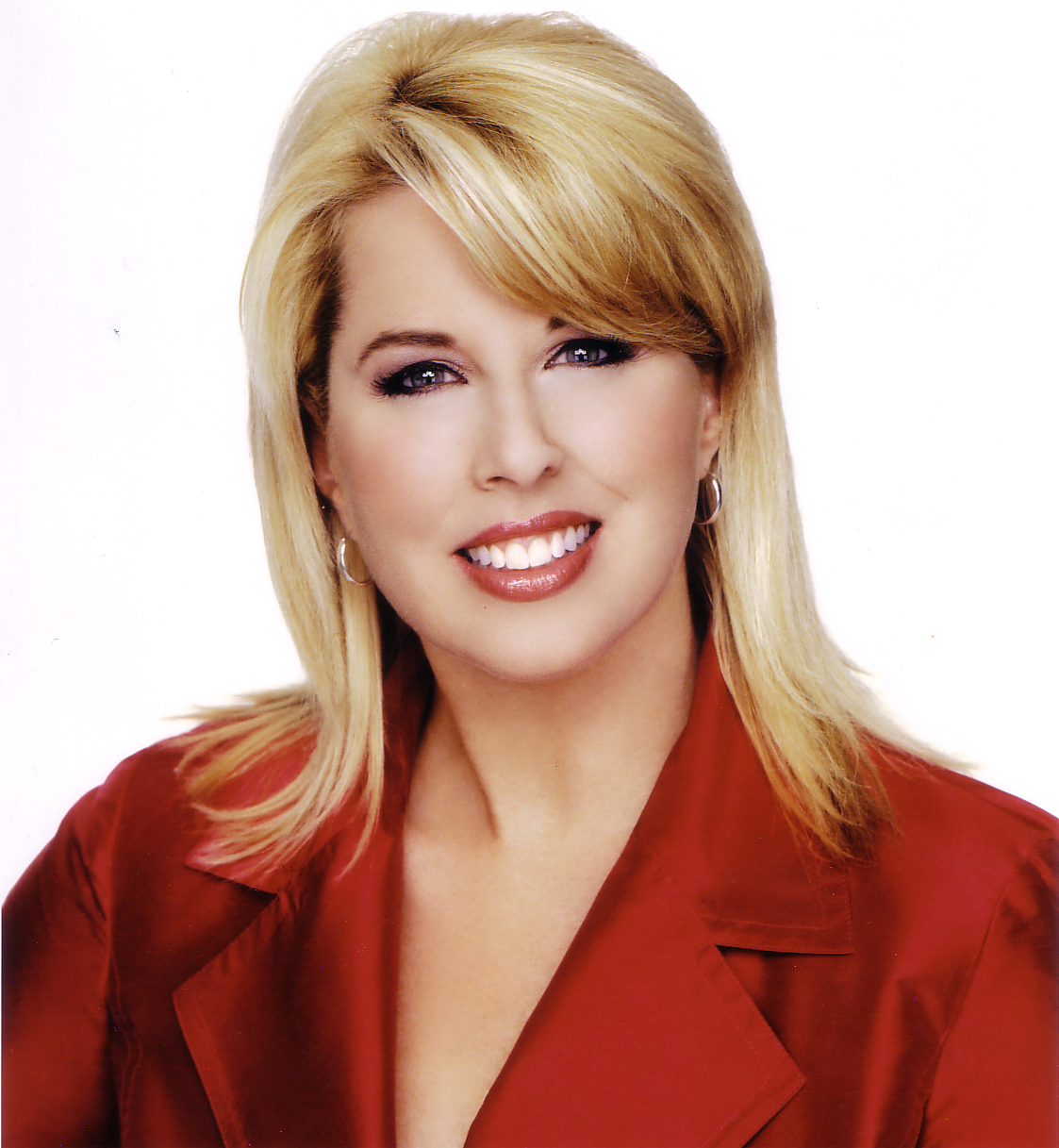
Rita Cosby, BA 1989, three-time Emmy Award winner, special correspondent for Inside Edition

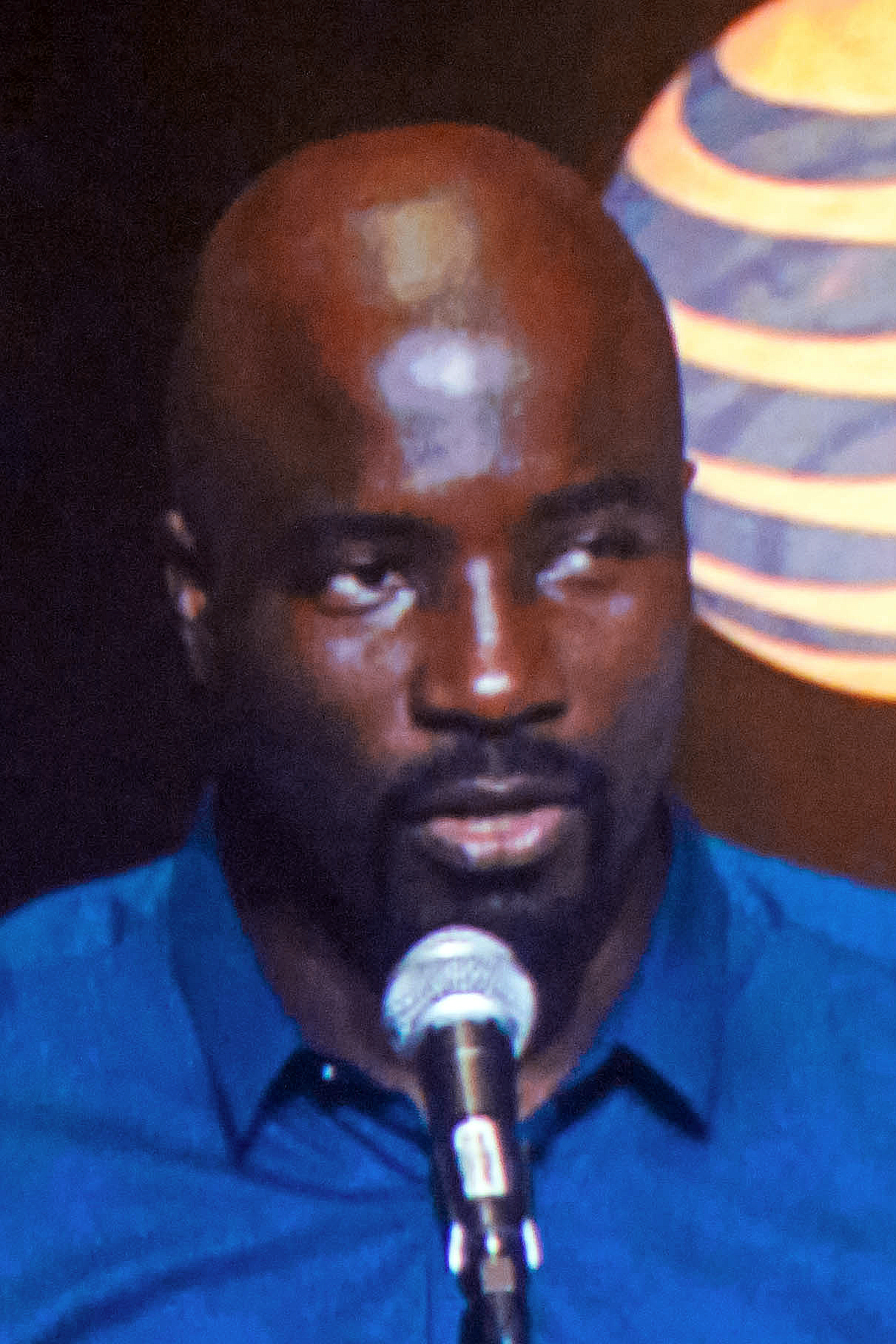
Mike Colter, BA 1999, actor best known for his role as Luke Cage in the Marvel Cinematic Universe

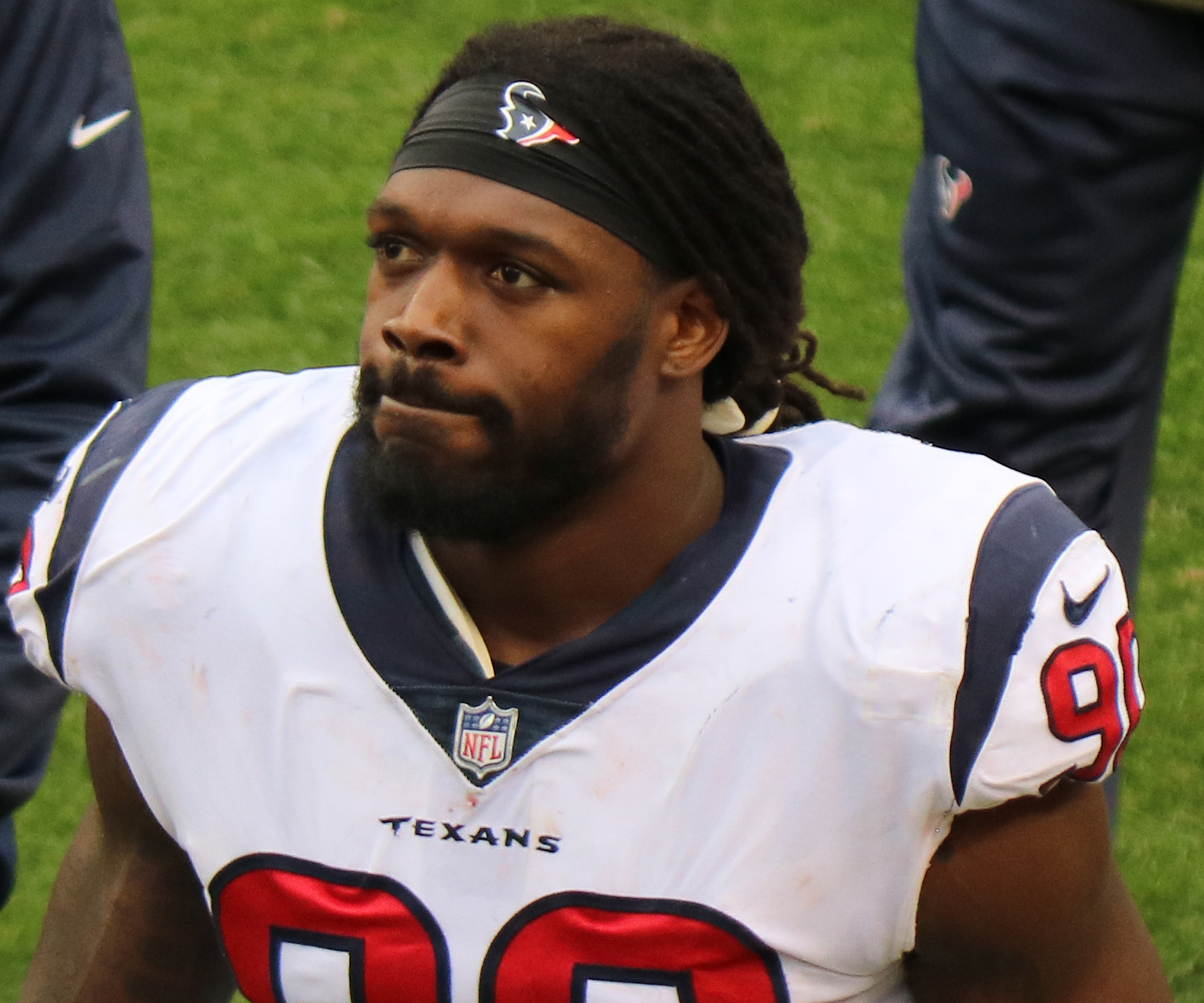
Jadeveon Clowney, linebacker for the Dallas Cowboys

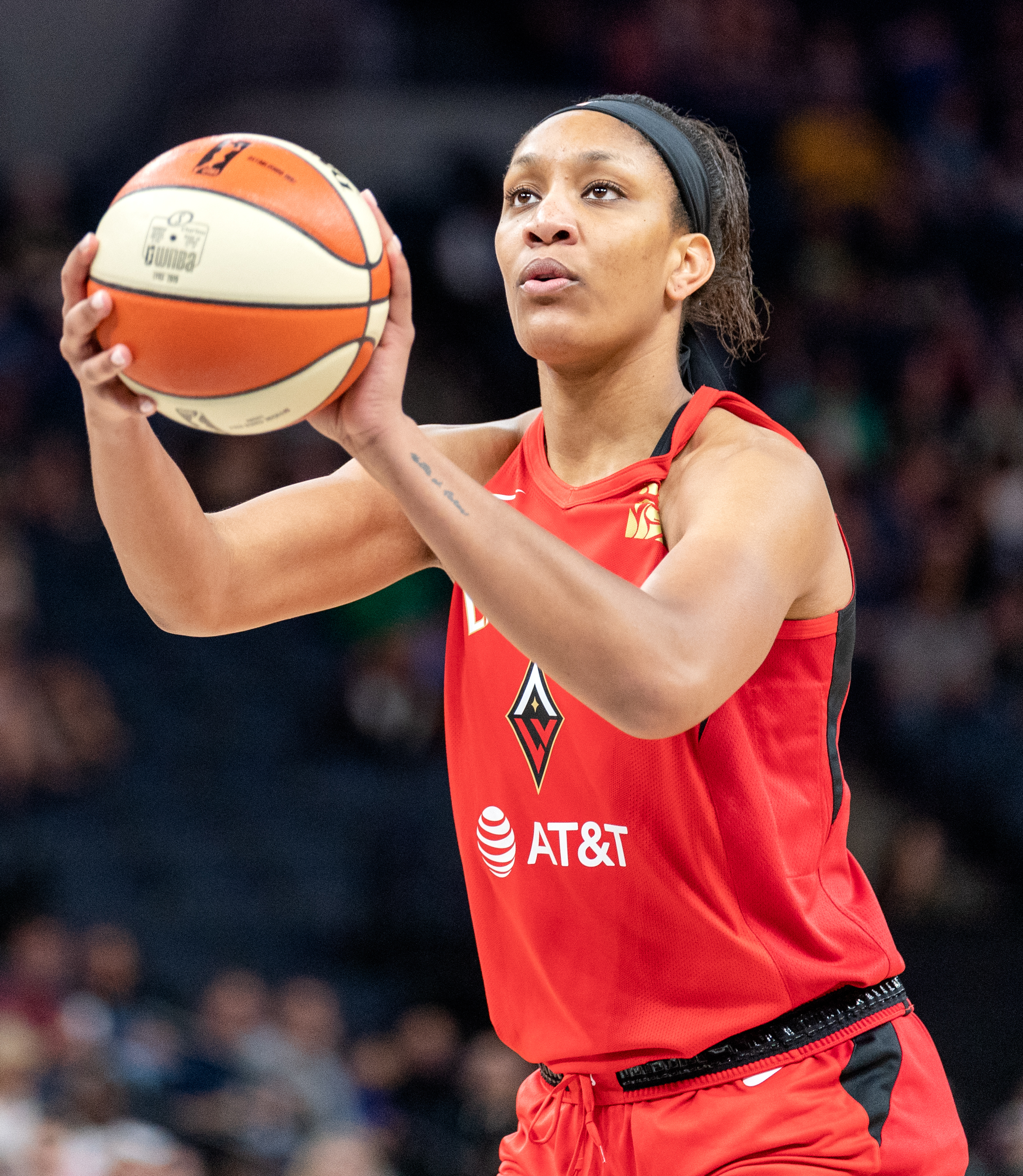
A'ja Wilson, BA 2018, No. 1 pick in the 2018 WNBA draft, 4-time WNBA MVP, 2017 NCAA champion

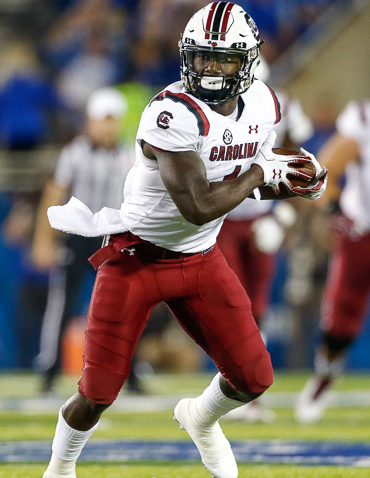
Deebo Samuel, BA 2019, wide receiver for the Washington Commanders

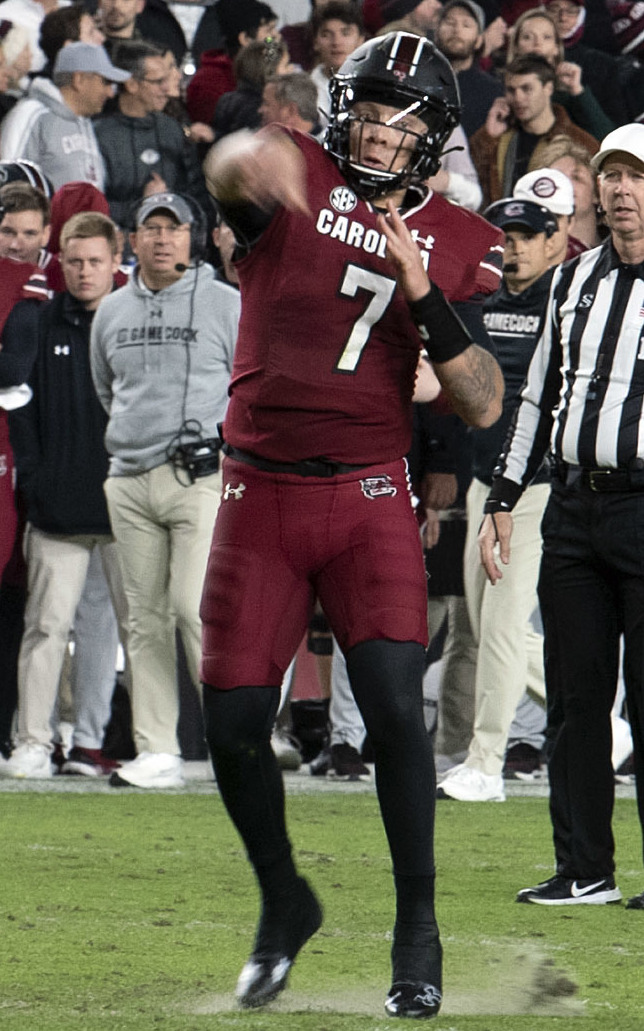
Spencer Rattler, BA 2023, quarterback for the New Orleans Saints

== Resources ==
- Faulkenbury, Evan (2025). History of the University of South Carolina (USC) - Annotated primary and secondary source bibliography and library guide on USC's history.
- Horn, Chris and Evan Faulkenbury (2020- ) Remembering the Days - USC's podcast about its history.

== See also ==
- The First Year Experience Program
- List of presidents of the University of South Carolina
- McMaster School
