= Callison (surname) =

Callison is a surname. Notable people with this name include:

- Brian Callison (born 1934), British novelist
- Candis Callison, Canadian journalist
- Cassie Callison, fictional character on US soap opera One Life to Live
- Charles Callison (born 1994), American basketball player
- Johnny Callison (1939–2006), American baseball player
- Preston Callison (1923–2022), American attorney and politician
- Prink Callison (1899–1986), American football player
- Zach Callison (born 1997), American actor, voice actor and singer
