= Berly =

Berly is a surname. Notable people with the surname include:

- Harry Berly (1905–1937), British violist, saxophonist, clarinetist and violinist
- Hugo Berly (1941–2009), Chilean footballer
- Jack Berly (1903–1977), American Major League Baseball pitcher
- Thomas Berly (1932–2024), Indian actor, director, producer, script writer, music composer, and author

== See also ==
- William Berly House, historic house in Lexington County, South Carolina
