= Maureen Googoo =

Miꞌkmaw journalist and businesswoman from Nova Scotia

Maureen Googoo is a Miꞌkmaw journalist and businesswoman from Indian Brook First Nation, Nova Scotia. Googoo is the owner and editor of the independent news website Ku'ku'kwes News, which is focused on Indigenous communities in Atlantic Canada.

Prior to founding Ku'ku'kwes News in 2015, Googoo worked in journalism for 20 years. The Telegram reported that she became "the first Indigenous reporter to work in mainstream media in the Maritimes" when she interned at CBC Radio in the early 1990s. Employed by the Aboriginal Peoples Television Network (APTN) for six years, she was a founding staff member and led its Halifax bureau by 2002.

== Early life and education ==
Googoo is Miꞌkmaq and was raised in Indian Brook First Nation, Nova Scotia, Canada. She is a member of the Sipekne'katik Band in Nova Scotia.

After her high school graduation around 1987, Googoo began monthly summer work for Micmac News at the newspaper's bureau in Truro, Nova Scotia. The experience soon led to an interest in reporting on Indigenous news for Indigenous people. She planned to go to university to obtain a degree in journalism and then return to Micmac News. The newspaper closed in 1991, during her studies. Googoo received a bachelor's degree from Saint Mary's University of Halifax, where she studied political science from 1987 to 1992 and interned at the Canadian Broadcasting Corporation for a year. According to The Telegram of St. John's, with her internship at CBC Radio, Googoo became "the first Indigenous reporter to work in mainstream media in the Maritimes." At the CBC, she found that editors did not believe that news stories from her local community, Indian Brook, would appeal to a general audience.

After a two-year post-graduate program at Ryerson Polytechnic University in Toronto, she graduated in 1994 with a journalism degree. After leaving school, she recalled initially being encouraged to cover Indigenous news, but soon faced resistance again: "I got into a huge argument with a bureau chief telling me if I kept pushing Aboriginal stories or if I kept continuing on with this 'Native-kick' that I was never going to be promoted or considered for prestigious beats." She recalled having to continue to push back on accusations of impartiality when she tried reporting Indigenous news.

== Career ==
By 2015, Googoo had worked as a journalist for 20 years, in several news mediums, and for the Chronicle Herald of Halifax, CBC, and Aboriginal Peoples Television Network (APTN). After working as director of communications for the Union of Nova Scotia Indians, she was an APTN correspondent in Halifax in 2000. One of the organisation's founding staff members, she presented the lead story on the debut broadcast of APTN National News on April 16, 2000. Footage filmed by Googoo of Innu youth inhaling gasoline was run on national television by the CTV weeks after prime minister Jean Chrétien's victory in the 2000 Canadian federal election. Innu leaders subsequently spoke with Chrétien, who said that he would help the Innu community of Sheshatshiu, Newfoundland and Labrador. By 2002, she led APTN's Halifax bureau, and ultimately worked for the organisation for six and a half years. She received a master's degree from Columbia Journalism School in 2007, after which she began pursuing independent work. She opened the news website RadioGoogoo.ca by 2011.

=== Ku'ku'kwes News ===
In 2015, Googoo founded the news website Ku'ku'kwes News (located at Kukukwes.com), which is focused on Indigenous communities in Atlantic Canada. The word ku'ku'kwes, which is another spelling of her surname Googoo, means "owl" in Miꞌkmaq. As the outlet's publisher, editor, and its only reporter at its opening, she began a crowdfunding campaign to raise money for operation costs and research trips. The website launched with a dozen news stories, including ones on the Miꞌkmaw Summer Games and the trial of a former Sipekne'katik Band finance director. By the following year, she worked on the website with photographer Stephen Brake, her husband.

Speaking about media coverage at the start of the 2020 Mi'kmaq lobster dispute, Canadian environmental journalist and academic Candis Callison said Ku'ku'kwes News had "been a vital source of information." As a result of the coverage, the website repeatedly shut down due to increased web traffic and she almost met her 4000$ monthly crowdfunding goal for the website after funding significantly increased. Her website in 2023 reported on the 54 Miꞌkmaq fisherman in Nova Scotia and New Brunswick who had been facing charges or undergoing trial.

In 2023, Indigenous media organisations including Ku'ku'kwes News were impacted after Canadian news content was blocked on the social media websites Facebook and Instagram by their owner Meta in response to the Online News Act.

=== Indigenous Media Association of Canada ===
In early 2025, Googoo became interim vice-president of the Indigenous Media Association of Canada (IMAC), a trade group of Indigenous journalists, at the organisation's incorporation. In an interview with CBC News, she stated that the group was formed so that Indigenous media organisations could have "an equal seat at that table."
