= Fox House (Lexington, South Carolina) =

Historic house in South Carolina, United States

- U.S. National Register of Historic Places
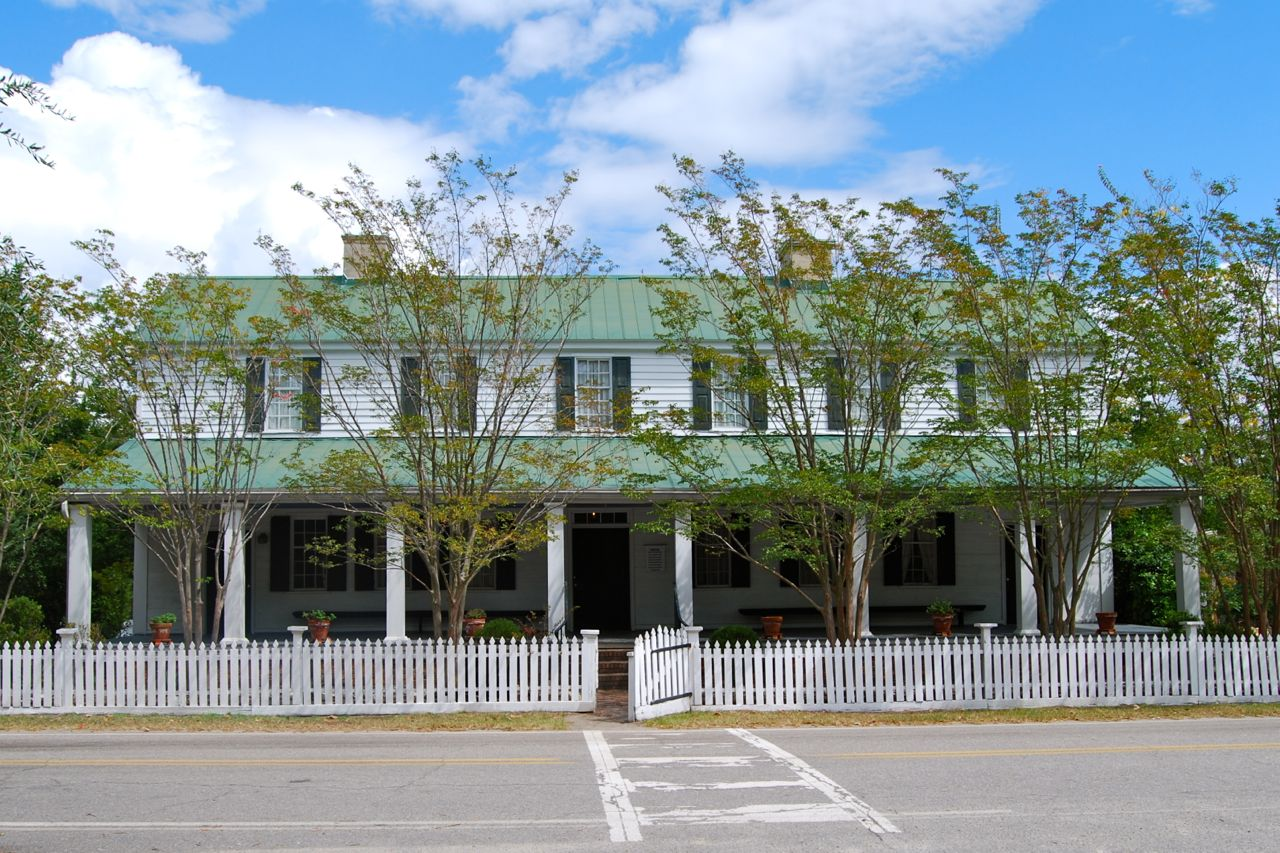
- John Fox House, September 2011

- Location within South Carolina Location within the United States
- Location: 232 Fox St., Lexington, South Carolina
- Coordinates: 33°59′14″N 81°14′23″W
- Area: 2.7 acres (1.1 ha)
- Built: c. 1830
- Architectural style: German-Swiss Carpenter
- NRHP reference No.: 70000893
- Added to NRHP: July 1, 1970

Fox House is a historic home located at Lexington, Lexington County, South Carolina, USA. It was built circa 1832, and is a two-story frame dwelling with an 11-foot deep porch across the front façade. The house is attached by breezeways to two dependencies, which are currently interpreted as a kitchen and the quarters for enslaved workers. These dependencies were originally both slave quarters that were not attached to the main house. The house was probably constructed for Jesse Bates but was purchased in 1843 by John Fox who was the county sheriff, clerk of court and a state senator. It became a part of the Lexington County Museum in 1970.

It was listed on the National Register of Historic Places in 1970.
