= Ernest L. Hazelius House =

Historic house in South Carolina, United States

- U.S. National Register of Historic Places
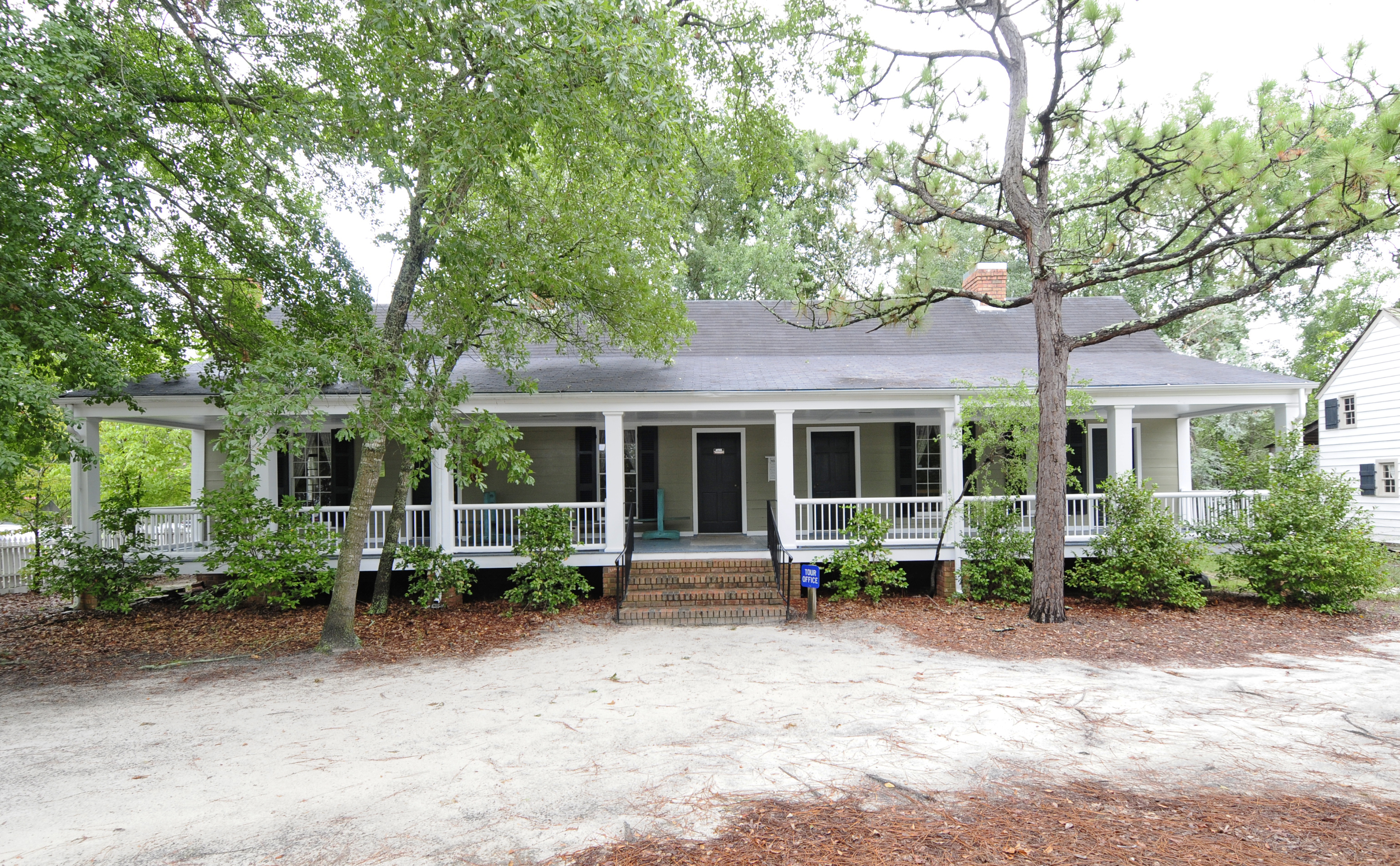
- Ernest L. Hazelius House, August 2012

- Location within South Carolina Location within the United States
- Location: Fox St., Lexington, South Carolina
- Coordinates: 33°59′14″N 81°14′26″W
- Area: 0.8 acres (0.32 ha)
- Built: c. 1830
- NRHP reference No.: 73001717
- Added to NRHP: May 11, 1973

Ernest L. Hazelius House is a historic home located at Lexington, Lexington County, South Carolina. It was built about 1830, and is a one-story, rectangular frame dwelling with a hall and parlor plan and four small bedrooms across the rear. It was the home of Ernest L. Hazelius, a clergyman of the Lutheran Church, academician, philosopher, author, and educator. The house was also the location where the traveling evangelist Charlie Tillman wrote down the song "Give Me that Old Time Religion" after hearing African-American citizens singing it.

It was listed on the National Register of Historic Places in 1973 and became a part of the Lexington County Museum in 1974, where it serves as the museum's tour office.
