= W. Q. M. Berly House =

Historic house in South Carolina, United States

- U.S. National Register of Historic Places
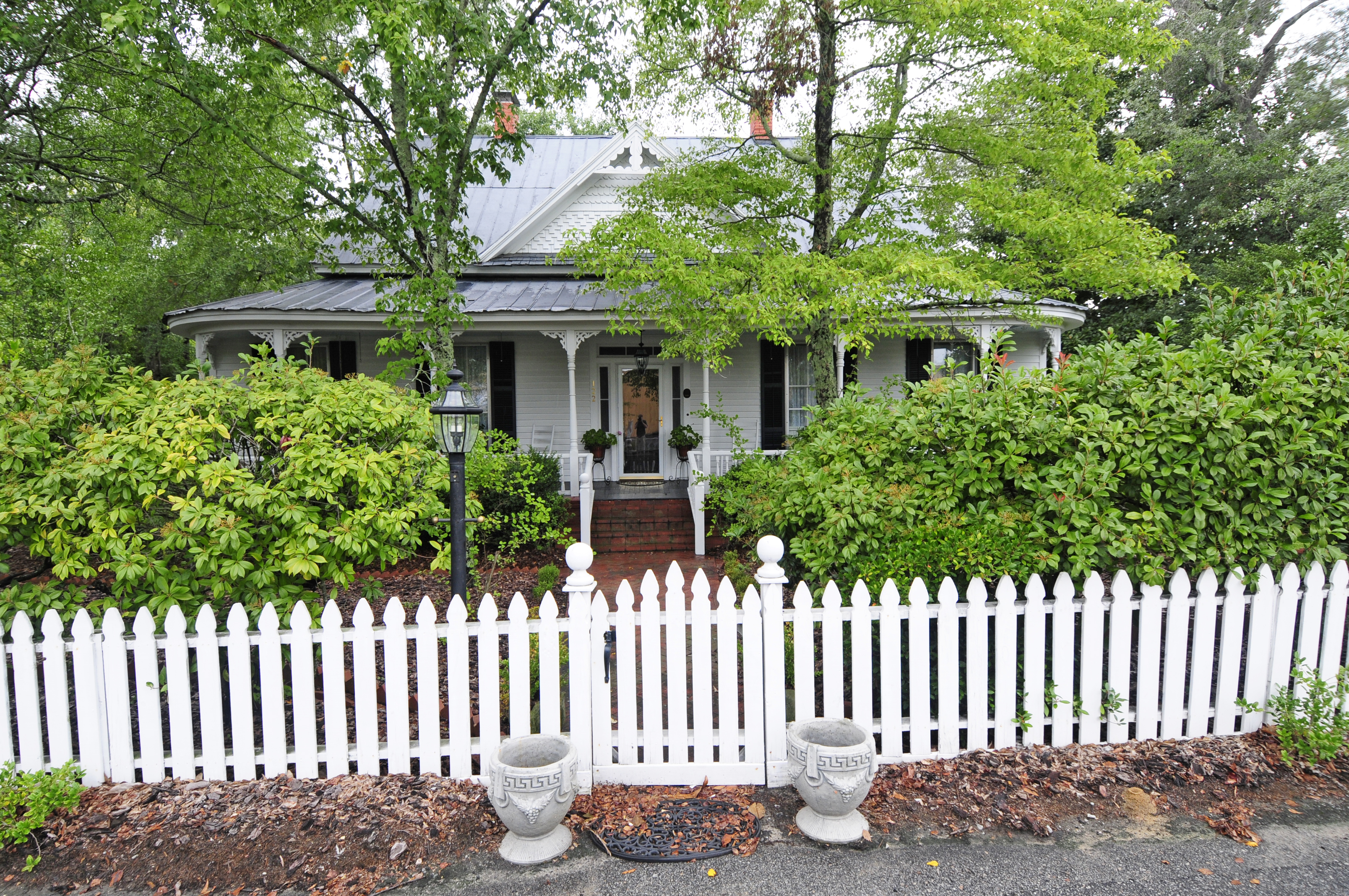
- W. Q. M. Berly House, August 2012

- Location within South Carolina Location within the United States
- Location: 122 Berly St., Lexington, South Carolina
- Coordinates: 33°59′14″N 81°14′30″W
- Area: 0.7 acres (0.28 ha)
- Built: 1904
- Built by: Harmon, Charles Wallace
- MPS: Lexington County MRA
- NRHP reference No.: 83003870
- Added to NRHP: November 22, 1983

W. Q. M. Berly House is a historic home located at Lexington, Lexington County, South Carolina. It was built in 1904, and is a one-story, frame cottage with a gable roof and irregular plan. It features a cross gable with sawn bargeboard, and a hip-roofed wraparound porch.

It was listed on the National Register of Historic Places in 1983.
