= Bank of Western Carolina =

- U.S. National Register of Historic Places
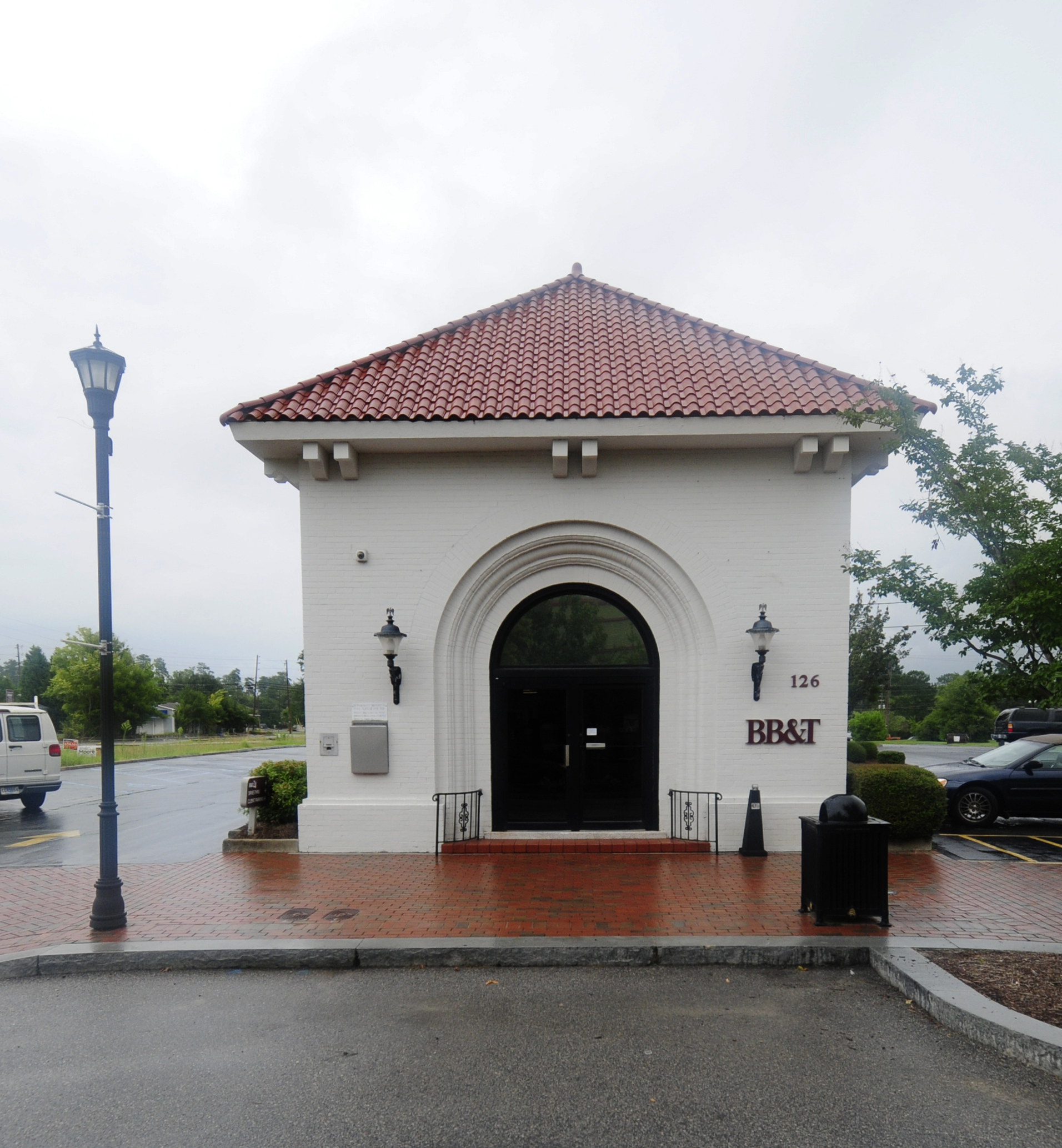
- Bank of Western Carolina, August 2012

- Location within South Carolina Location within the United States
- Location: 126 Main St., Lexington, South Carolina
- Coordinates: 33°58′53″N 81°14′12″W
- Area: 0.1 acres (0.040 ha)
- Built: c. 1912
- MPS: Lexington County MRA
- NRHP reference No.: 83003860
- Added to NRHP: November 22, 1983

Bank of Western Carolina, also known as Lexington State Bank (after 1966), is a historic bank building located at Lexington, Lexington County, South Carolina. It was built about 1912, and is a one-story, rectangular, brick building. It has a tiled hipped roof and features eave brackets and an arched entry. It is one of five commercial buildings that survived the 1916 fire. The building houses Bodhi Thai, a "fine dining" Thai restaurant.

It was listed on the National Register of Historic Places in 1983.
