= Vastine Wessinger House =

Historic house in South Carolina, United States

- U.S. National Register of Historic Places
- Nearest city: Lexington, South Carolina
- Area: 0.6 acres (0.24 ha)
- Built: c. 1891
- MPS: Lexington County MRA
- NRHP reference No.: 83003923
- Added to NRHP: November 22, 1983

Vastine Wessinger House is a historic home located near Lexington, Lexington County, South Carolina. It was built about 1891, and is a two-story, rectangular, frame farmhouse. It is sheathed in weatherboard and has a truncated hip roof. The front façade features a projecting Victorian influenced, ornamented double-tiered porch. Also on the property is a contributing small, frame building used as a garage, but originally operated as a store by in the 1890s and from 1910 to 1935 as a farm commissary.

It was listed on the National Register of Historic Places in 1983.
