= Lexington, South Carolina =

Town in South Carolina, US

- Town
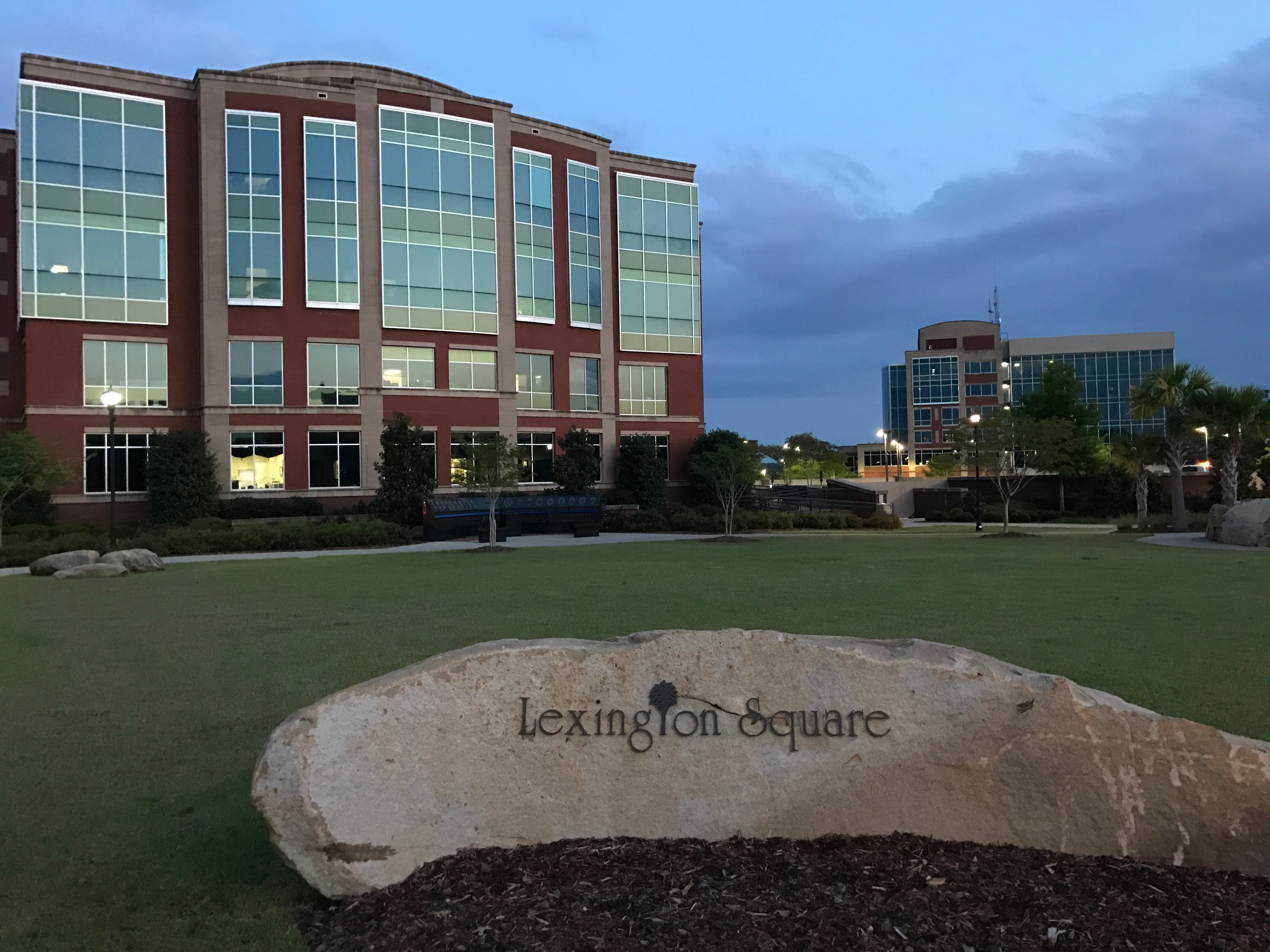

- Seal
- Motto: "Town of Progress"
- Location in South Carolina Location in the United States
- Coordinates: 33°59′52″N 81°13′51″W
- Country: United States
- State: South Carolina
- County: Lexington County
- Established: 1861
- Named for: Battles of Lexington and Concord (Note: The town of Lexington is named after Lexington County, which derives its name from the battles of Lexington and Concord.)

Government
  - Type: Mayor-Council
  - Body: Lexington Town Council

Area
  - Total: 12.12 sq mi (31.38 km^{2})
  - Land: 11.97 sq mi (31.00 km^{2})
  - Water: 0.15 sq mi (0.38 km^{2})
- Elevation: 315 ft (96 m)

Population (2020)
  - Total: 23,568
  - Rank: 22nd
  - Density: 1,968.9/sq mi (760.19/km^{2})
- Time zone: UTC−5 (Eastern (EST))
  - Summer (DST): UTC−4 (EDT)
- ZIP codes: 29071, 29072, 29073
- Area codes: 803, 839
- FIPS code: 45-41335
- GNIS feature ID: 2406014
- Website: www.lexsc.gov

Lexington is the most populous town in and the county seat of Lexington County, South Carolina, United States. It is a suburb of the state capital, Columbia. The population was 23,568 at the 2020 Census, and it is the second-most populous municipality in the greater Columbia area. The 2022 estimated population is 24,626. According to the Central Midlands Council of Governments, the greater Lexington area (Note: Approximately six miles in each direction from the town center) had an estimated population of 111,549 in 2020 and is considered the fastest-growing area in the Midlands.

== History ==
=== Colonial Period ===
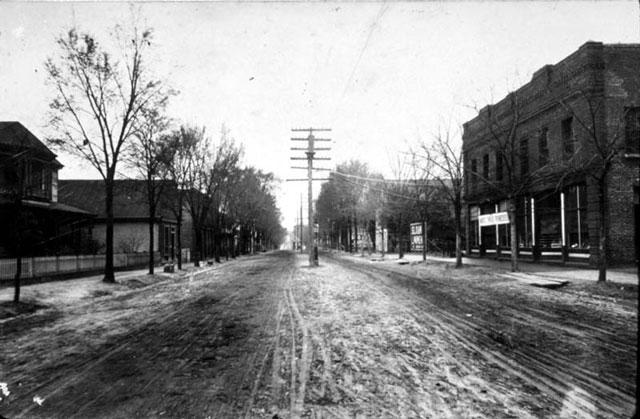
Lexington, SC Main Street (1916)

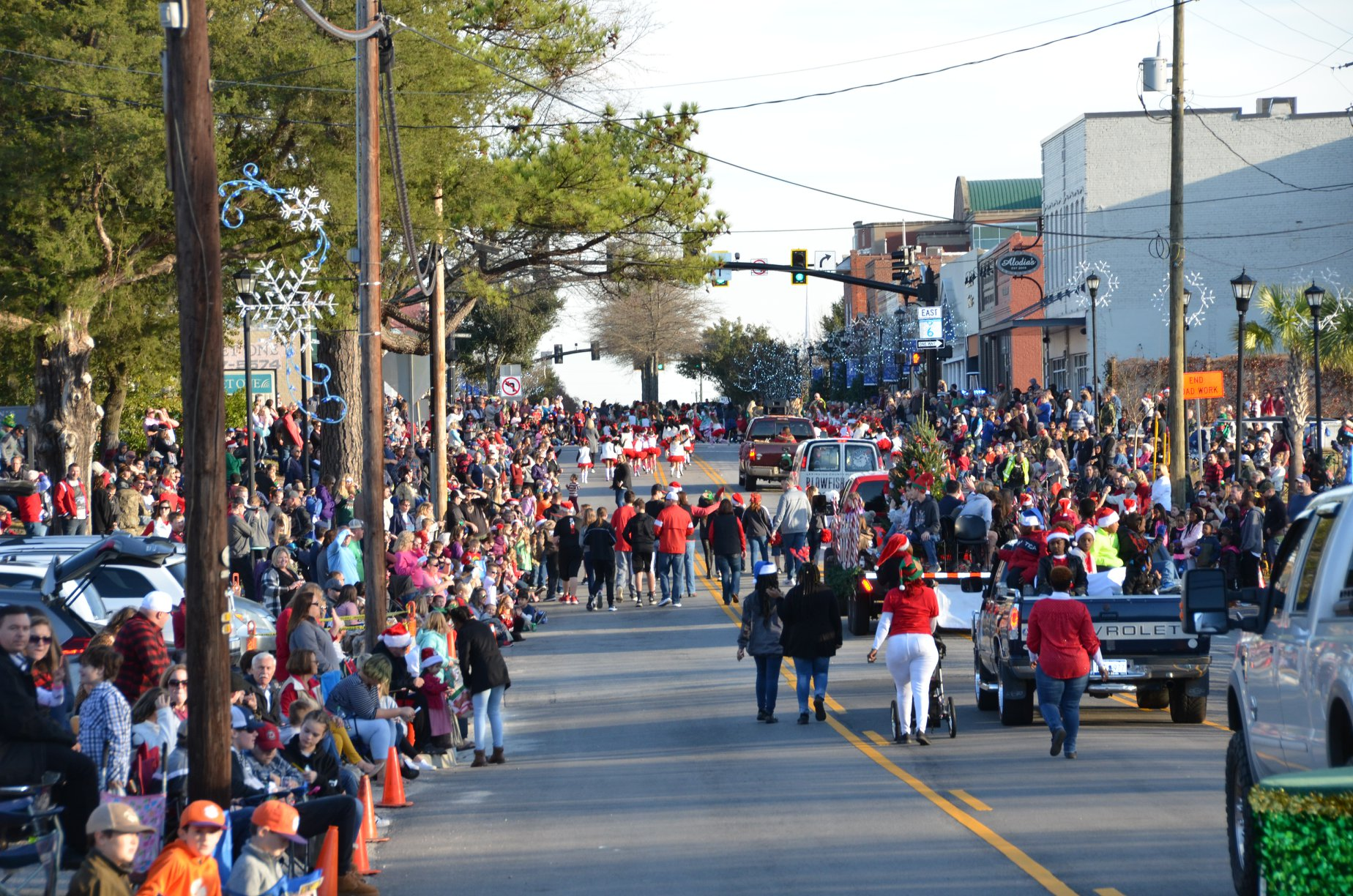
Lexington 2019 Christmas Parade

In 1735, the colonial government of King George II established 11 townships in backcountry South Carolina to encourage settlement and to provide a buffer between Native American tribes to the west and colonial plantations in the Lowcountry. The townships included one named Saxe Gotha, which flourished with major crops of corn, wheat, tobacco, hemp, and flax as well as beeswax and livestock, and its residents were primarily of German and Swiss heritage. Two major Native American trails existed in the area: the Cherokee Path, primary route of English and Scots traders from Charlestown to Native Americans in the Appalachian Mountains, and the Occaneechi Path, which connected natives from the Chesapeake Bay region to North Carolina, South Carolina, and Georgia.

In 1785, the name Saxe Gotha was replaced with Lexington County in commemoration of the Battles of Lexington and Concord in Massachusetts. In 1781, the Battle of Muddy Springs was fought to the south of the present-day town and the Battle of Tarrar Springs was fought within the present-day town limits.

=== Post-revolution ===
Until 1820, Granby was the county seat of Lexington County, but chronic flooding forced the local government to move the courthouse to its present location in Lexington. The area was known by locals as the "Lexington Courthouse" and was not incorporated as the Town of Lexington until 1861.

During the Carolinas campaign in the American Civil War, much of the town of Lexington was destroyed by Union forces as they protected William Sherman's western flank as Union troops attacked Columbia. Most of the town of Lexington, including the courthouse, were torched and burned. Like much of the South after the Civil War, Lexington struggled economically, but local farms and the lumber industry helped stabilize the economy after Reconstruction. Many current brick buildings were built in the aftermath of severe fires in 1894 and 1916. By the 1890s, the Columbia to Augusta Railroad and the Lexington Textile Mill prompted the town to grow.

With the advent of the automobile in the 1920s and its mass production in the 1940s and 1950s, Lexington continued to grow as a suburb of Columbia. Additionally, the creation of Lake Murray in 1930 encouraged many to move to Lexington. Between the 1990 Census and the 2000 Census, Lexington's population increased by 198%, and by 83% between the 2000 census and the 2010 census.

=== Recent history ===
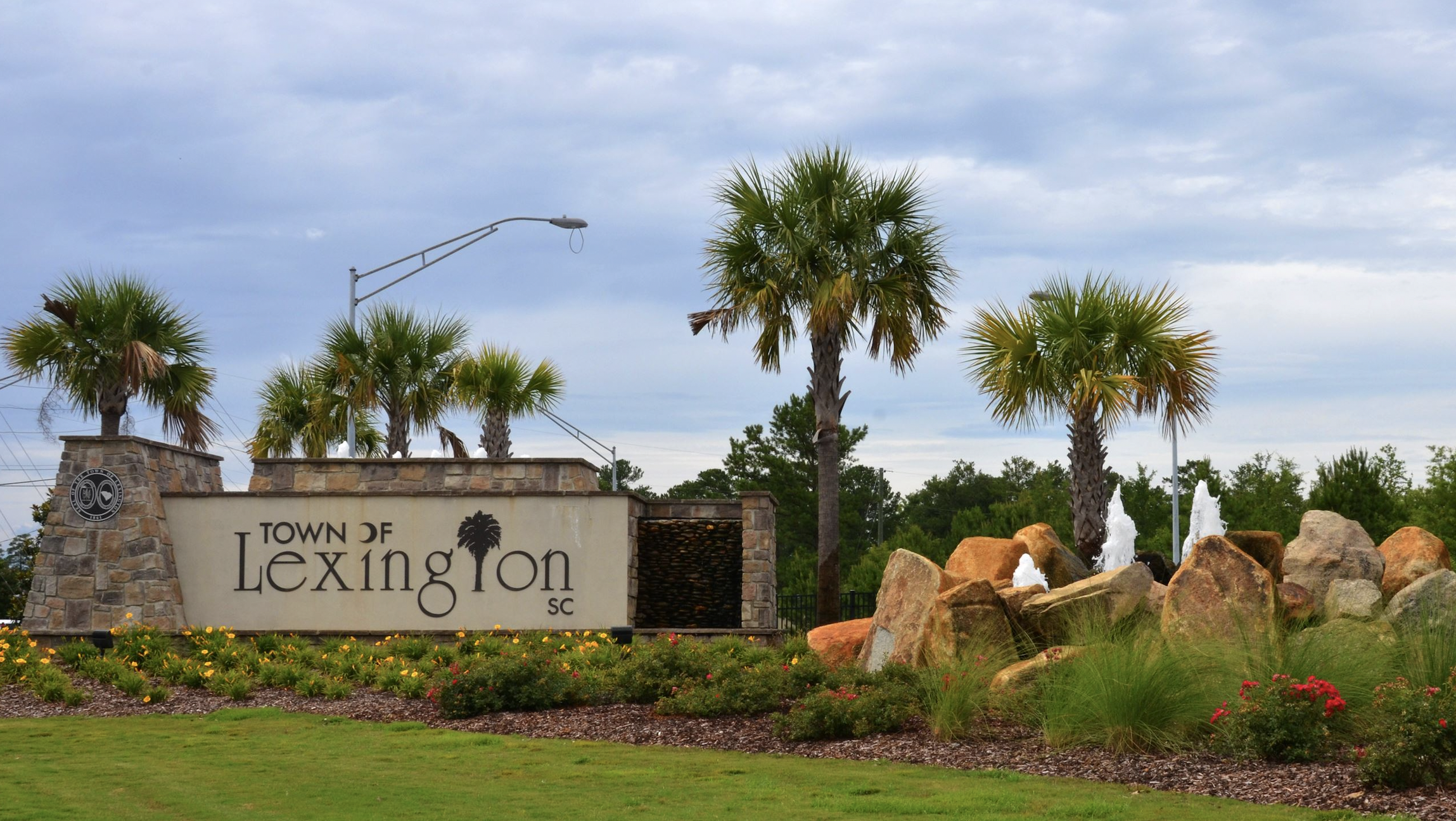
Welcome Sign, Lexington, SC off of Highway 378

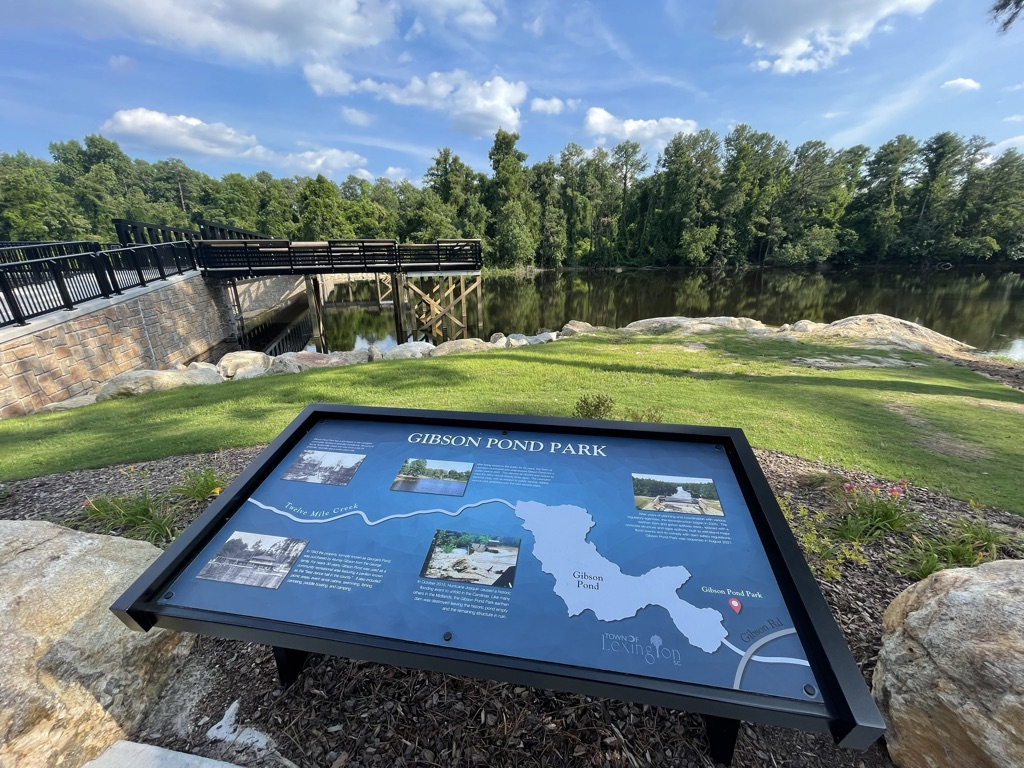
Gibson Pond – Lexington, SC

The "move over law", a law that requires drivers to change lanes when there is a stopped emergency vehicle on the side of the road, originated in Lexington. James D. Garcia, a paramedic, was struck and injured at an accident scene on January 28, 1994, after attempting to assist a driver that had slid off of the road. The South Carolina Highway Patrol listed Garcia at fault, leading to his work to create this law. The South Carolina General Assembly passed the "move over law" (SC 56–5–1538) 1996 and was revised in 2002 to increase the ease of enforcement and fines. A version of the "move over law" is now in effect in all 50 US states and the District of Columbia; Hawaii was the last to pass legislation in 2012.

On August 16, 1994, Lexington was struck by an F-3 tornado, generated from the remnants of Tropical Storm Beryl, resulting in over 40 injuries and $50 million in damages. From the same tropical storm, 21 other tornados were reported throughout the state, including six in Lexington County.

A Murphy Express gas station on Augusta Highway in Lexington sold a $400 million winning Powerball ticket on September 18, 2013. At the time, it was the fifth largest winning ticket of any United States lottery.

In 2015, remnants from Hurricane Joaquin brought historic flooding to South Carolina. In Lexington, extreme flooding resulted in the destruction of Gibson Park Dam, which led to the subsequent failure of the Old Mill Dam. Gibson Park Dam (pictured right) was reconstructed and opened to the public in 2021; Old Mill Dam was reconstructed in 2022. The flooding additionally resulted in the destruction of several roads and businesses in the town.

=== National Register of Historic Places ===
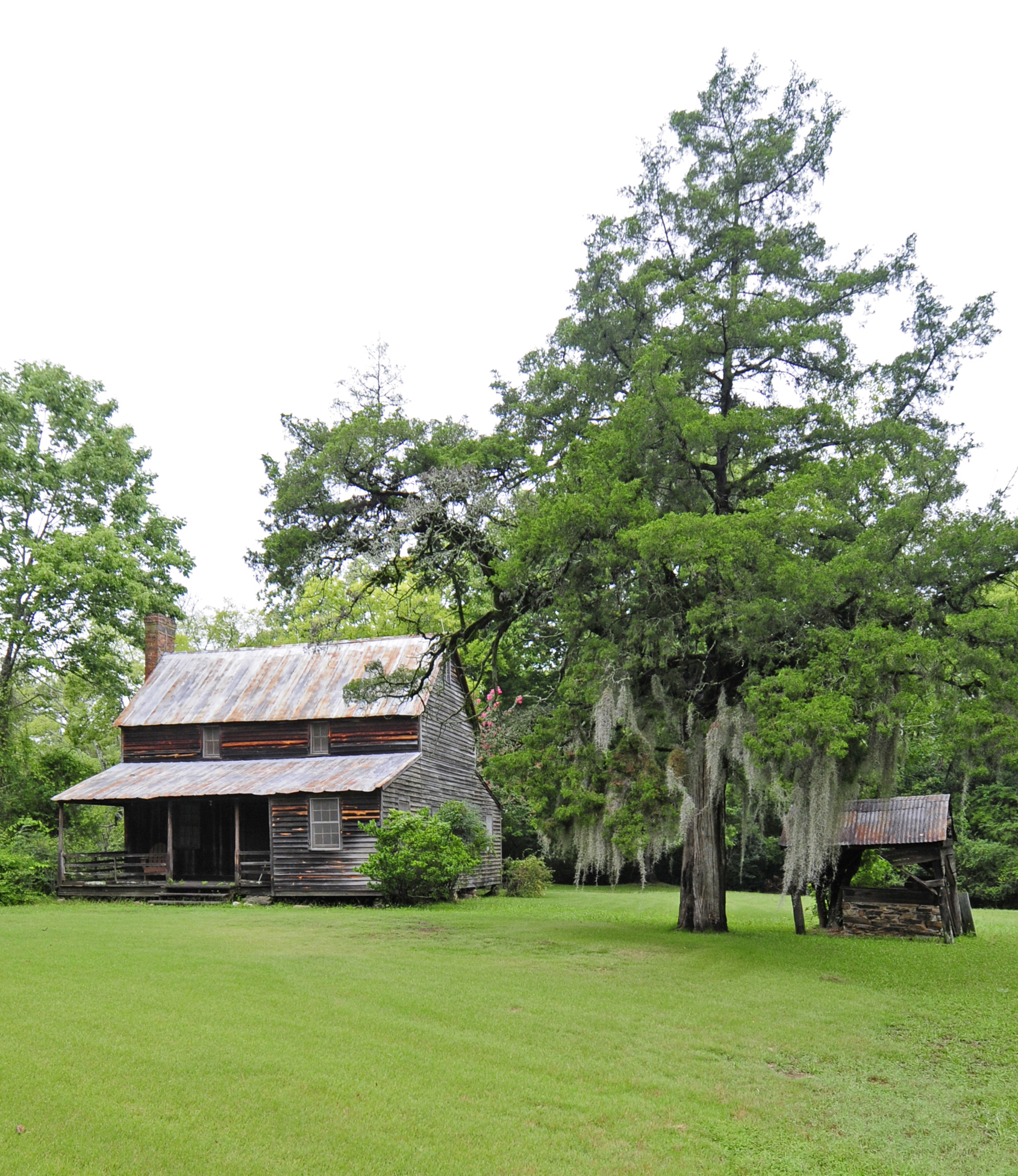
The Ballentine-Shealy House c. 1870.

Buildings listed on the National Register of Historic Places include:

- The Ballentine-Shealy House
- Bank of Western Carolina
- W. Q. M. Berly House
- William Berly House
- Lemuel Boozer House
- C.E. Corley House
- Fox House
- Gunter-Summers House
- James Harman Building
- Ernest L. Hazelius House
- John Solomon Hendrix House
- John Jacob Hite Farm
- Home National Bank
- Lexington County Courthouse
- Henry Lybrand Farm
- Maj. Henry A. Meetze House
- Old Batesburg-Leesville High School
- Charlton Rauch House
- David Rawl House
- Simmons-Harth House
- James Stewart House
- Vastine Wessinger House

== Government ==
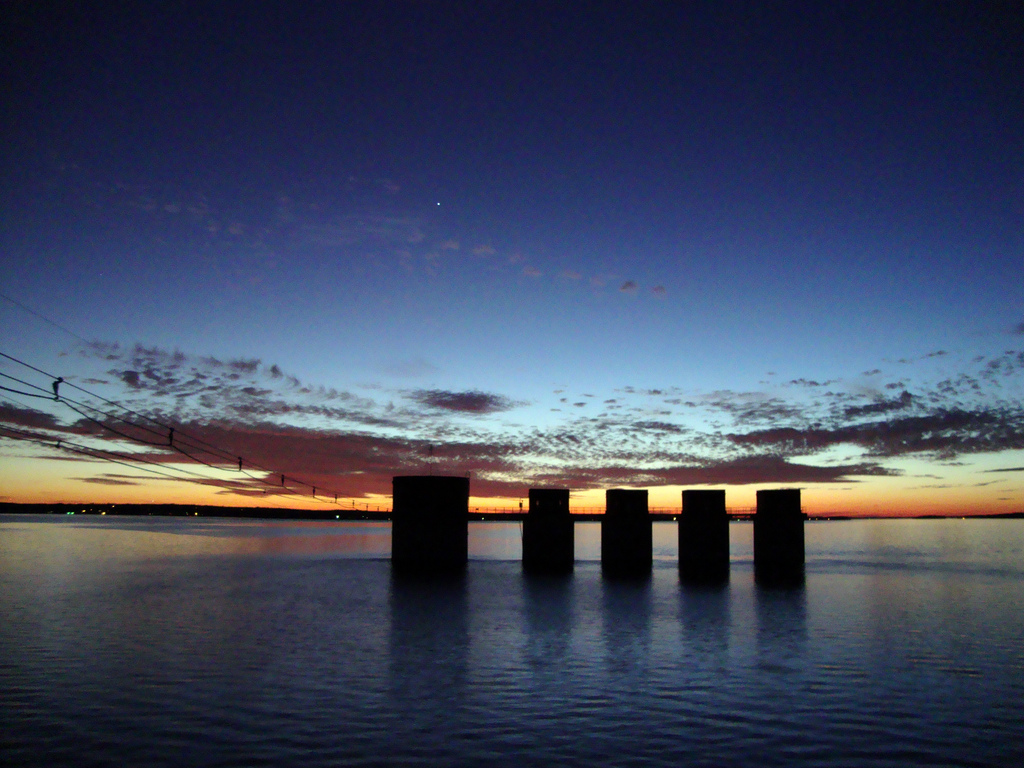
Lake Murray at Lexington.

Lexington has a mayor-council government, consisting of seven council members, including the mayor. Lexington's style of government takes the form of a weak-mayor administration; each member of the council and the mayor has one vote in relation to town matters. The mayor does not have any veto authority or any formal power outside of the council. Each member of the council is elected at-large and serves a term of four years.

On December 4, 2023, Hazel Livingston, who had served as Mayor Pro-Tem since 2004, was sworn in as the first woman mayor of Lexington, South Carolina.

On November 5, 2013, incumbent Lexington mayor Randy Halfacre lost a reelection bid to Councilman Steve MacDougall by 18 votes. A recount was initiated but the results remained the same. Steve MacDougall served as mayor for 10 years until 2023.

In 2015, Lexington's town council voted in a 5-1 motion to impose a 2% hospitality tax on all prepared food items. As a result, any prepared food item sold in the town, such as fast food or restaurant food items, has a total tax of 9%. The council vote garnered criticism after a county-wide tax referendum failed the year before; if passed the county would have increased sales tax by 1% for traffic improvements. The tax generates over two million dollars annually, and the town uses the funds for road and traffic improvement, including the addition of turn lanes, the upgrading of traffic lights, and the improving of intersections. The largest project completed was the conversion of South Carolina Highway 6 (Lake Drive) and Church Street (named for St. Stephen's Lutheran Church) to one-way streets in downtown Lexington in 2019. Future projects include the building of an overpass over Interstate 20.

On July 2, 2020, the town council passed a town ordinance requiring citizens to wear face masks in public to combat the COVID-19 pandemic in South Carolina. Councilman Todd Carnes drew criticism after stating three times in the council meeting that the government has "infinite power" to create laws such as these, but opposed enacting a face mask ordinance because "science does not indicate that it helps."

=== Elected Officials ===
Town of Lexington, SC Elected Officials
Name	Title	Since
Hazel Livingston	Mayor	December 2023
Ron Williams	Mayor Pro-tem	December 2023
Will Allen	Council Member	December 2023
Todd Carnes	Council Member	March 2014
Jeannie Michaels	Council Member	December 2023
Gavin James Smith	Council Member	May 2023
Todd Lyle	Council Member	November 2018

== Geography ==
Lexington is located in northeastern Lexington County.

According to the United States Census Bureau, the town has a total area of 12.0 square miles (31.0 km^{2}), of which 11.9 square miles (30.7 km^{2}) are land and 0.2 square miles (0.4 km^{2}), or 1.21%, are water. The town is drained on the north by Fourteenmile Creek and on the south by Twelvemile Creek, both northeast-flowing tributaries of the Saluda River.

Lexington is 12 miles (19 km) west of Columbia, South Carolina's state capital and second-largest city.

== Climate ==
The lowest recorded temperature in Lexington was −2 °F (−19 °C) in February 1899. The warmest recorded temperature was 111 °F (44 °C) in June 2012. July averages the most yearly precipitation. Lexington averages 48 in (1.2 m) of rain per year; Lexington averages 1.6 in (4.1 cm) of snow per year.

Climate data for Columbia, South Carolina (Columbia Airport), 1981–2010 normals
Month	Jan	Feb	Mar	Apr	May	Jun	Jul	Aug	Sep	Oct	Nov	Dec	Year
Record high °F (°C)	84 (29)	84 (29)	93 (34)	96 (36)	101 (38)	107 (42)	109 (43)	107 (42)	106 (41)	101 (38)	90 (32)	83 (28)	109 (43)
Mean daily maximum °F (°C)	56.0 (13.3)	61 (16)	68 (20)	76 (24)	84 (29)	90 (32)	93 (34)	91 (33)	85 (29)	76 (24)	67 (19)	58 (14)	75 (24)
Mean daily minimum °F (°C)	30 (−1)	33 (1)	41 (5)	50 (10)	60 (16)	68 (20)	72 (22)	71 (22)	64 (18)	52 (11)	42 (6)	32 (0)	51 (11)
Record low °F (°C)	−1 (−18)	−4 (−20)	4 (−16)	26 (−3)	34 (1)	44 (7)	54 (12)	53 (12)	40 (4)	23 (−5)	12 (−11)	4 (−16)	−4 (−20)
Average precipitation inches (mm)	3.58 (91)	3.74 (95)	3.73 (95)	2.62 (67)	2.97 (75)	4.69 (119)	5.46 (139)	5.26 (134)	3.54 (90)	3.17 (81)	2.74 (70)	3.22 (82)	44.56 (1,132)
Average snowfall inches (cm)	0.1 (0.25)	0.8 (2.0)	0.1 (0.25)	0 (0)	0 (0)	0 (0)	0 (0)	0 (0)	0 (0)	0 (0)	0 (0)	0.1 (0.25)	1.6 (4.1)
Average precipitation days (≥ 0.01 in)	9.9	9.1	8.6	8.0	7.7	10.5	11.8	10.5	7.3	7.0	7.3	9.0	106.8
Average snowy days (≥ 0.1 in)	0.5	0.3	0.1	0	0	0	0	0	0	0	0	0.1	1.0
Mean monthly sunshine hours	173.6	183.6	238.7	270.0	291.4	279.0	285.2	263.5	240.0	235.6	195.0	173.6	2,829.2
Source: NOAA (extremes 1887–present),

== Economy ==
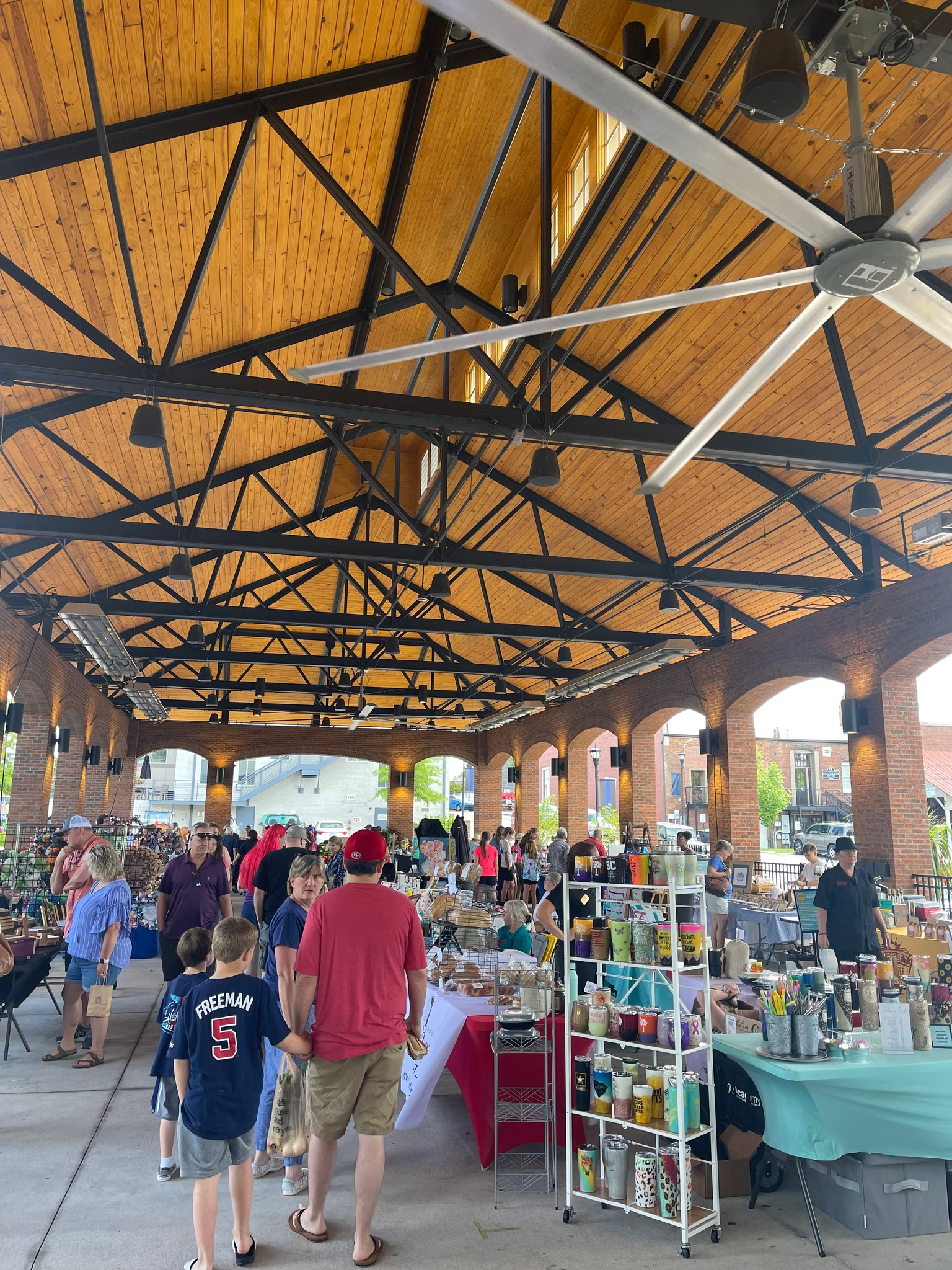
Saturday Market in Lexington, SC

In 2022, retail sale within the town accounted for nearly $2.5 billion. In 2020, the median household income was $74,996 and the percentage of residents living below the poverty line was 9.11%. According to the Town's 2020 Comprehensive Annual Financial Report, the top employers in the city are:

#	Employer	# of Employees
1	Lexington School District 1	1,083
2	Lexington County	905
3	Walmart	367
4	Town of Lexington	180
5	Publix	160
6	Lowe's	150
7	Home Depot	150
8	Avtec	135
9	Target	120
10	Kohl's	107

== Transportation ==
=== Public transportation ===
Public transportation in Lexington is provided by the COMET, or officially the Central Midlands Regional Transit Authority (CMRTA). The bus system is the main public transit system for the greater Columbia area.

=== Roads and highways ===
==== Interstate highways ====
- I-20 – Interstate 20 travels from west to east and connects Columbia to Atlanta and Augusta in the west and Florence in the east. It serves the nearby towns and suburbs of West Columbia, Oak Grove, and Red Bank.

==== U.S. routes ====
- U.S. 1
- U.S. 378

==== S.C. highways ====
- SC 6

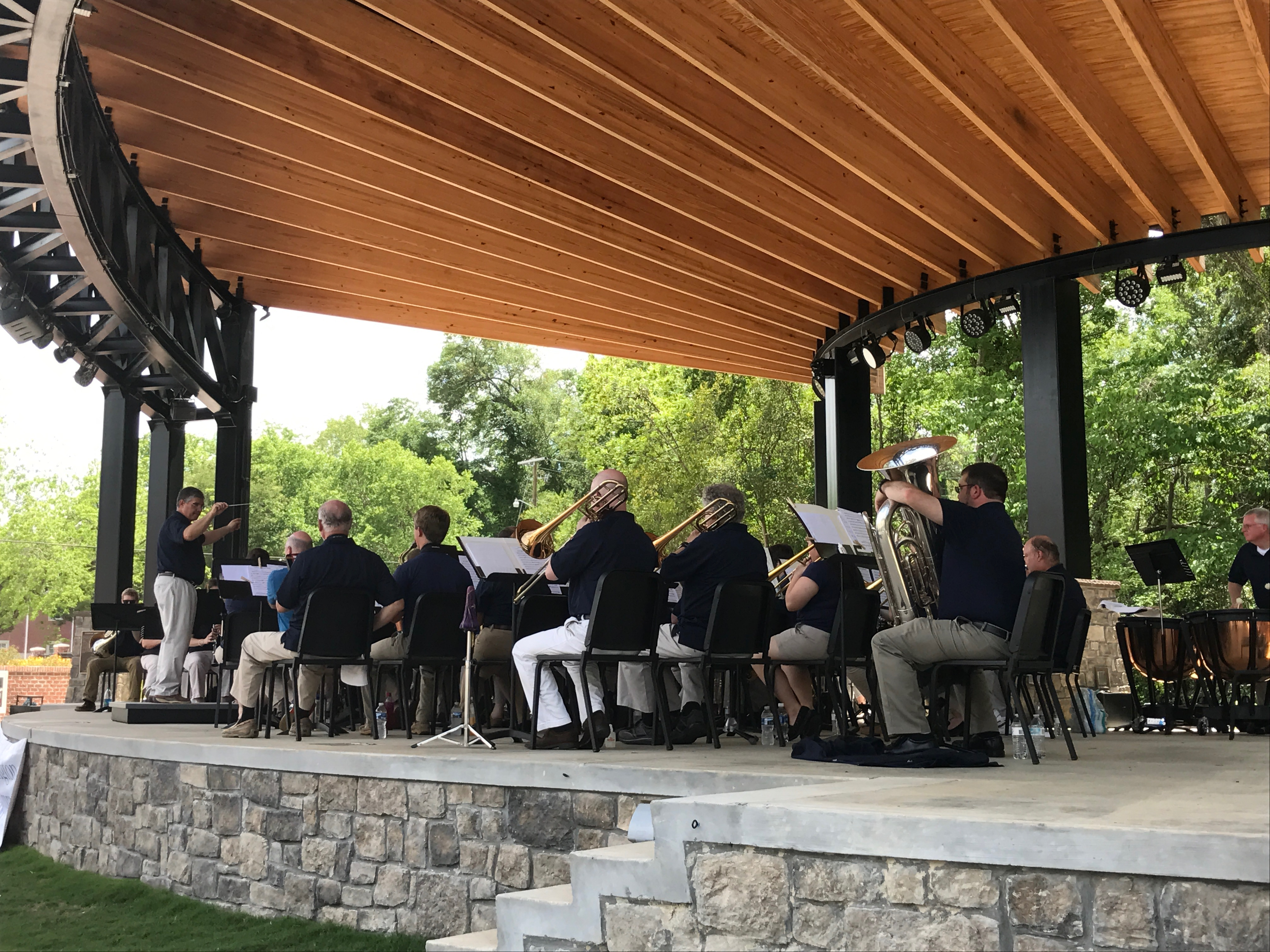
Lexington, SC community band playing at the Icehouse Amphitheater

== Tourism ==
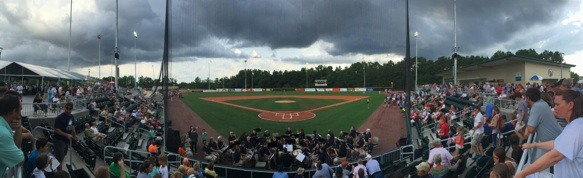
The Lexington Community Band performs "The Star-Spangled Banner" at the opening of a Blowfish baseball game.

- Slightly north of the town of Lexington rests one of South Carolina's major lakes, Lake Murray. The lake is held by a 1.7-mile-long (2.7 km) dam 5 miles (8 km) north of town, on which people are free to drive, bike, run, or walk. The Saluda Dam, or Lake Murray Dam, provides electricity for the surrounding region and connects Lexington with Irmo. A public swimming area is open during the summer months on the Lexington side of the dam.
- Lexington County Blowfish Baseball Stadium
- Lexington Community Band
- Icehouse Amphitheater-hosted Florida's Sister Hazel in 2018, Greenville's Edwin McCain in 2017, NC's Parmalee in 2019, Taylor Dayne in 2023, and Eddie Montgomery in 2023.
- Three public parks: Virginia Hilton Park, Gibson Pond Park, and Corley Street Water Park
- Lexington County Museum
- Fourteen-Mile Creek Trail
- Gibson Pond Park

== Demographics ==
Historical population
Census	Pop.	Note	%±
1880	262		—
1890	342		30.5%
1900	806		135.7%
1910	709		−12.0%
1920	894		26.1%
1930	1,152		28.9%
1940	1,033		−10.3%
1950	1,081		4.6%
1960	1,127		4.3%
1970	969		−14.0%
1980	2,131		119.9%
1990	3,289		54.3%
2000	9,793		197.8%
2010	17,870		82.5%
2020	23,568		31.9%
2025 (est.)	25,729	▲	9.2%
U.S. Decennial Census

=== 2020 census ===
As of the 2020 census, Lexington had a population of 23,568. There were 9,462 households, including 5,270 families.

The median age was 37.9 years. 25.3% of residents were under the age of 18 and 16.1% of residents were 65 years of age or older. For every 100 females there were 88.8 males, and for every 100 females age 18 and over there were 84.2 males age 18 and over.

99.8% of residents lived in urban areas, while 0.2% lived in rural areas.

There were 10,211 housing units, of which 7.3% were vacant. The homeowner vacancy rate was 1.8% and the rental vacancy rate was 8.8%.

Lexington racial composition
Race	Num.	Perc.
White (non-Hispanic)	16,841	71.46%
Black or African American (non-Hispanic)	2,666	11.31%
Native American	49	0.21%
Asian	1,581	6.71%
Pacific Islander	23	0.1%
Other/Mixed	1,005	4.26%
Hispanic or Latino	1,403	5.95%

=== 2010 census ===
As of the census of 2010, there were 17,870 people, 8,101 households, and 2,558 families residing in the town. The population density was 1,724.4 inhabitants per square mile (665.8/km^{2}). There were 4,025 housing units at an average density of 708.7/sq mi (273.6/km^{2}). Since 2005, 3,200 new homes have been built within the town limits, as well as 130 new businesses.

In the 2010 census, the racial makeup of the town was 83.88% White, 12.48% Black or African American, 0.18% Native American, 2.05% Asian, 0.03% Pacific Islander, 0.67% from other races, and 0.70% from two or more races. Hispanic or Latino of any race were 1.91% of the population.

There were 3,644 households, out of which 40.5% had children under the age of 18 living with them, 55.9% were married couples living together, 12.3% had a female householder with no husband present, and 29.8% were non-families. 24.9% of all households were made up of individuals, and 7.5% had someone living alone who was 65 years of age or older. The average household size was 2.51 and the average family size was 3.03.

In the town, the population was spread out, with 27.1% under the age of 18, 7.5% from 18 to 24, 39.6% from 25 to 44, 18.3% from 45 to 64, and 7.5% who were 65 years of age or older. The median age was 33 years. For every 100 females, there were 97.6 males. For every 100 females age 18 and over, there were 96.3 males.

The median income for a household in the town was $53,865, and the median income for a family was $65,694. Males had a median income of $44,883 versus $29,020 for females. The per capita income for the town was $23,416. About 5.2% of families and 7.2% of the population were below the poverty line, including 7.3% of those under age 18 and 14.5% of those age 65 or over.

== Education ==
Public education in Lexington is administered by Lexington County School District One, which has an enrollment of over 27,000 students and employees 3,900 faculty and staff.

Public schools (Note: Schools within another municipality's boundaries are not included.)
Elementary schools	Enrollment
Pleasant Hill Elementary School	948
Midway Elementary School	947
Meadow Glen Elementary School	908
Carolina Springs Elementary School	800
Lake Murray Elementary School	759
Saxe Gotha Elementary School	752
Rocky Creek Elementary School	730
Deerfield Elementary School	723
Oak Grove Elementary School	715
White Knoll Elementary School	711
New Providence Elementary School	672
Lexington Elementary School	644
Red Bank Elementary School	579
Middle schools	Enrollment
Pleasant Hill Middle School	1,208
Meadow Glen Middle School	1,029
Lakeside Middle School (Note: Formerly Lexington Middle School)	992
Carolina Springs Middle School	930
Beechwood Middle School	850
White Knoll Middle School	787
High schools	Enrollment
Lexington High School	2,105
River Bluff High School	2,047
White Knoll High School	1,955
Lexington Technology Center	(Note: No fixed enrollment)
Adult education	Enrollment
Rosenwald Community Learning Center	100

=== Library ===
Lexington has a branch of the Lexington County Public Library.

== Neighboring towns and cities ==
Municipalities within 15 miles (24 km) of the center of Lexington, listed clockwise:

- Cayce (east 9.5 miles)
- Springdale (east 7.5 miles)
- Pine Ridge (southeast 9 miles)
- South Congaree (southeast 7.5 miles)
- Gilbert (west-southwest 10 miles)
- Summit (west-southwest 11.5 miles)
- Chapin (northwest 14.5 miles)
- Irmo (north-northeast 8 miles)
- Columbia (east-northeast 11.5 miles)
- West Columbia (east-northeast 9.5 miles)

== Notable people ==
- John Boozer, former professional baseball player for the Philadelphia Phillies
- Nick Ciuffo, 2013 first-round pick by the Tampa Bay Rays
- Manuel S. Corley, congressman (1868–1869)
- Darline Graham, U.S. Senator (2026–present)
- Emily Geiger, American Revolutionary heroine
- Nikki Haley, former UN Ambassador and 116th governor of South Carolina (Note: Haley served as the representative from Lexington's 87th District in the South Carolina House of Representatives from 2005-2011.)
- Timothy Jones Jr., known for murdering his five children in 2014.
- Lacie Lybrand, Miss South Carolina USA 2006
- Bob Peeler, former lieutenant governor (1995–2003), trustee of Clemson University
- Shaq Roland, South Carolina Gamecocks and West Georgia Wolves wide receiver
- Wrenn Schmidt, actress.
- Floyd Spence, congressman from 1970 to 2001
- Demetris Summers, former Canadian football running back for the Calgary Stampeders
- Caitlin Upton, model and beauty pageant titleholder.
- Harold E. Wilson, Marine in Korean War; awarded Congressional Medal of Honor
