= Henry Lybrand Farm =

Historic house in South Carolina, United States

- U.S. National Register of Historic Places
- Nearest city: Lexington, South Carolina
- Area: 3.6 acres (1.5 ha)
- Built: c. 1835
- MPS: Lexington County MRA
- NRHP reference No.: 83003911
- Added to NRHP: November 22, 1983

Henry Lybrand Farm, also known as the Connelly Farm, is a historic home and farm located near Lexington, Lexington County, South Carolina. It was built about 1835, and is a two-story, rectangular, frame dwelling. It is sheathed in weatherboard and has a gable roof. The front façade features a one-story shed-roofed porch supported by square wood posts. The house has a one-story rear ell, built about 1900. Also on the property is the only intact cotton gin house left in the county, a cook's house, a small wash house, a smokehouse, a log barn, a two-story log barn, a corncrib, and a granary.

It was listed on the National Register of Historic Places in 1983.
