= David Rawl House =

Historic house in South Carolina, United States

- U.S. National Register of Historic Places
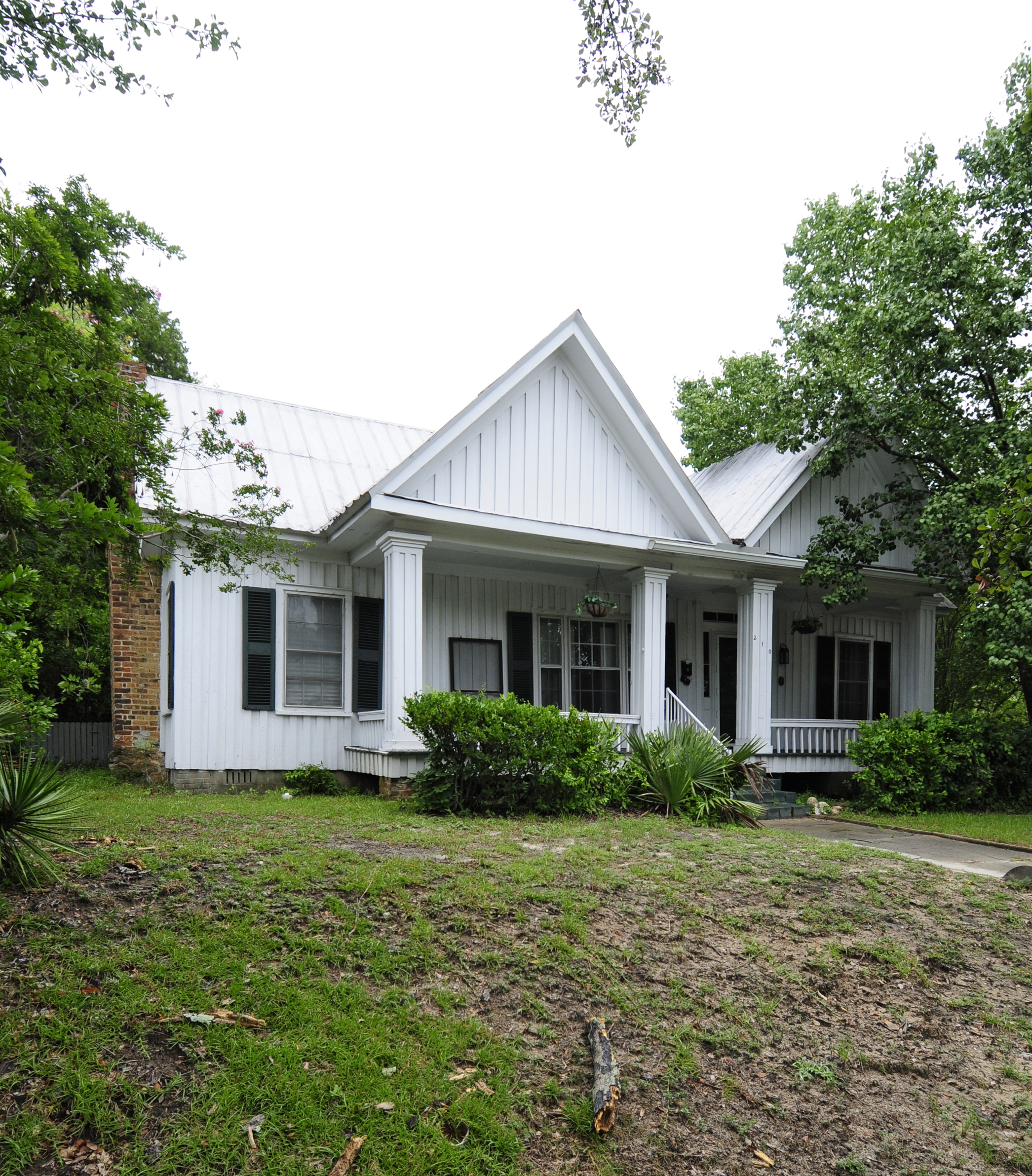
- David Rawl House, August 2012

- Location within South Carolina Location within the United States
- Location: 210 W. Main St., Lexington, South Carolina
- Coordinates: 33°58′59″N 81°14′21″W
- Area: 0.6 acres (0.24 ha)
- Built: c. 1854
- MPS: Lexington County MRA
- NRHP reference No.: 83003915
- Added to NRHP: November 22, 1983

David Rawl House is a historic home located at Lexington, Lexington County, South Carolina. It was built about 1854, and is a rectangular, one-story, frame cottage with board-and-batten siding. It has a gable roof and a rear ell. It is one of nine surviving antebellum houses in Lexington.

It was listed on the National Register of Historic Places in 1983.

In 2015, 210 Shoppe + Studio opened inside the 1854 David Rawl House and has made an emphasis to maintain the historical character as much as possible. 210 Shoppe + Studio is a gift shoppe that specializes in out of the ordinary gifts with a focus on the arts. They also feature artwork and a studio by Wayne Rogers (waynerogersarchitectartist.com).
