= Maj. Henry A. Meetze House =

Historic house in South Carolina, United States

- U.S. National Register of Historic Places
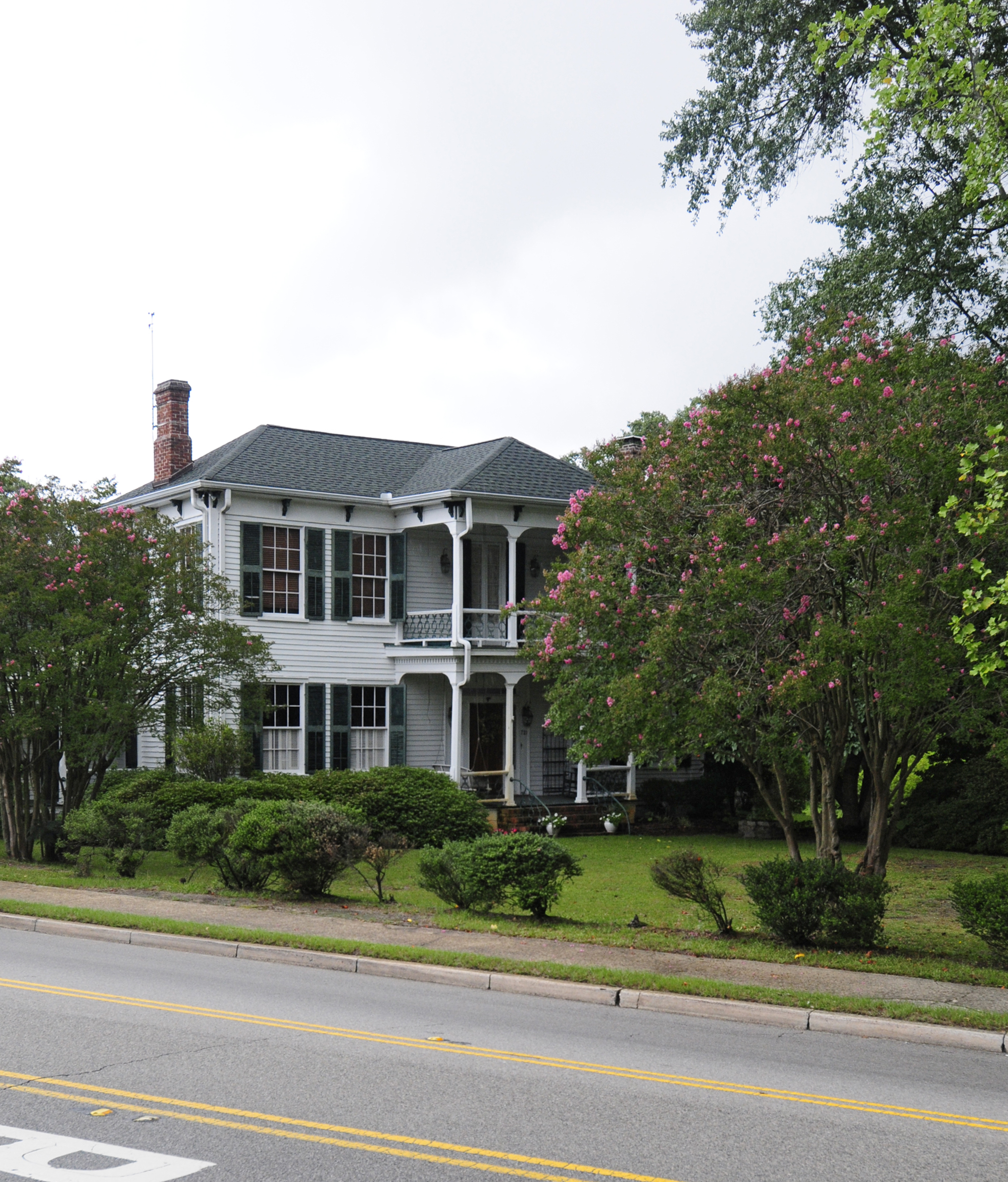
- Maj Henry A Meetze House, August 2012

- Location within South Carolina Location within the United States
- Location: South of Lexington at 723 S. Lake Dr., near Lexington, South Carolina
- Coordinates: 33°58′6″N 81°14′4″W
- Area: 1.2 acres (0.49 ha)
- Built: 1855
- Built by: Henry Adam Meetze
- Architectural style: Italianate
- NRHP reference No.: 79002387
- Added to NRHP: July 13, 1979

Maj. Henry A. Meetze House is a historic home located near Lexington, Lexington County, South Carolina. It was built about 1855, and consists of a two-story, rectangular main block, with one-story side wings and a rear ell. The vernacular Italianate dwelling features a hipped roof with bracketed eaves, one and two-story porticoes with cast iron decoration, and bay windows. Also on the property is the original wellhouse and several sheds. Henry Meetze (1820-1904) was a prominent attorney, businessman and civic leader in the Lexington area.

It was listed on the National Register of Historic Places in 1979.
