= Emily Geiger =

American Revolutionary War messenger

- Born: c. 1765; Lexington District, South Carolina
- Died: 1825 (aged 59–60)
- Spouse: John Threwits (m. 1789)
- Children: 1

Emily Geiger (c. 1765–1825) was a Patriot messenger active during the American Revolutionary War. Captured by Loyalists whilst on a mission to deliver a message on behalf of General Nathanael Greene, Geiger ate the written message in her possession. Upon release she verbally delivered the letter to its recipient.

== Family history ==
Geiger's family was from the village of Wydnau, Zurich, Switzerland. Arriving in Charleston, South Carolina, on February 1, 1737, the family settled in Saxe Gotha, South Carolina. Geiger married John Threwits, with whom she had one child, a daughter named Elizabeth Juliet Threwits.

== Revolutionary War ==
In 1781, following the siege of Ninety-Six, General Nathanael Greene crossed Broad River, hoping to send an order to General Thomas Sumter, then on the Wateree River, to join him that they might attack Lord Rawdon, who had divided his force. South Carolina experienced high levels of support for the Loyalist cause, making delivering such a message a dangerous task. Emily Geiger volunteered to deliver the message on behalf of General Nathanael Greene. Geiger convinced Greene, claiming that a woman would throw the British off as they would likely suspect the messenger to be a man. The general, both surprised and delighted, consented to her proposal. He wrote a letter and gave it to Geiger, and at the same time communicated the contents of it verbally, to be told to General Sumter in case of accidents or capture. Geiger pursued her journey on horseback, riding sidesaddle. She traveled under the guise of being on her way to her Uncle Jacob's house.

On the second day of her journey, Lord Rawdon's scouts intercepted her near the Congaree River. Because she was coming from the direction of Greene's army, Geiger was suspected of working for the Patriot cause, arrested and detained at Fort Granby. As Geiger was a woman, the soldiers waited on a female Loyalist to arrive in order to search her. Whilst waiting to be searched, Geiger tore the message to pieces and ate it all. When the female Loyalist arrived to search her, she found nothing. They let her go and had someone accompany her on her journey to her Uncle Jacob's house. Once there, Geiger made her way to General Sumter and delivered the message verbally.

== Burial ==
Geiger's grave marker was moved to the Geiger Cemetery in 1958. The State newspaper stated on April 13, 1958, that “A granite marker to Herman Geiger", a pioneer citizen of the Congregate area, is to be dedicated at 3:30 p.m. May 11, 1958, at the Geiger (formerly Tyler Field) Cemetery. This historic spot is near the line between Calhoun and Lexington counties, on the Calhoun side, a quarter of a mile west of U.S. Highway 176 on a county road halfway between Geiger's store and the county line. Geiger was born and died in South Carolina.

== Memorials ==
Three South Carolina chapters of the Daughters of the American Revolution have been named for Emily Geiger, but only one is currently in existence. The Emily Geiger Chapter NSDAR is based in Bluffton, South Carolina, and has members from Bluffton, Hilton Head Island, and other areas of Beaufort County. To honor Geiger and commemorate her heroic ride, the woman holding the laurel branch on the South Carolina State Seal is designated as Emily Geiger. There are also monuments to her at the Cayce history museum and the South Carolina statehouse (Capitol).
