= Ballentine-Shealy House =

Historic house in South Carolina, United States

- U.S. National Register of Historic Places
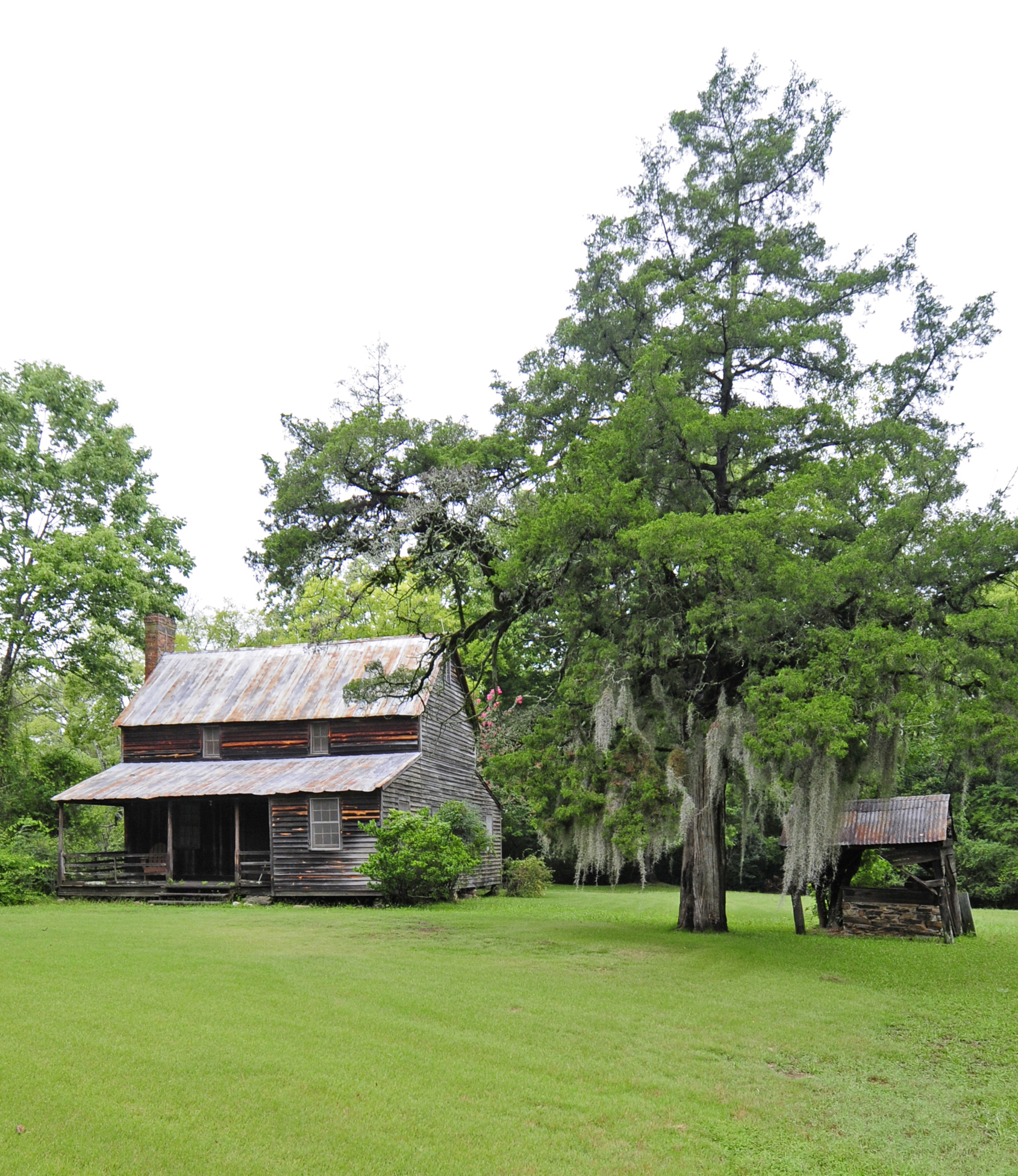
- Ballentine-Shealy House, August 2012

- Location within South Carolina Location within the United States
- Location: South Carolina Highway 1323, near Lexington, South Carolina
- Coordinates: 34°6′17″N 81°22′55″W
- Area: 2 acres (0.81 ha)
- MPS: Lexington County MRA
- NRHP reference No.: 83003858
- Added to NRHP: November 22, 1983

Ballentine-Shealy House, also known as the Ballentine-Shealy-Slocum House, is a historic home located near Lexington, Lexington County, South Carolina. It was built in the late-18th or early-19th century, and is a 1 1/2-story, rectangular log building. It is sheathed in weatherboard and has a standing seam metal gable roof. It has shed rooms on the rear and a one-story shed-roofed front porch with an enclosed room. The house has a hall-and-parlor plan and an enclosed stair. An open breezeway connects the house to the kitchen (ca. 1870), which has a fieldstone and brick chimney and a side porch. Also on the property a dilapidated dairy, a small log barn, and a well house.

It was listed on the National Register of Historic Places in 1983.
