= John Solomon Hendrix House =

Historic house in South Carolina, United States

- U.S. National Register of Historic Places
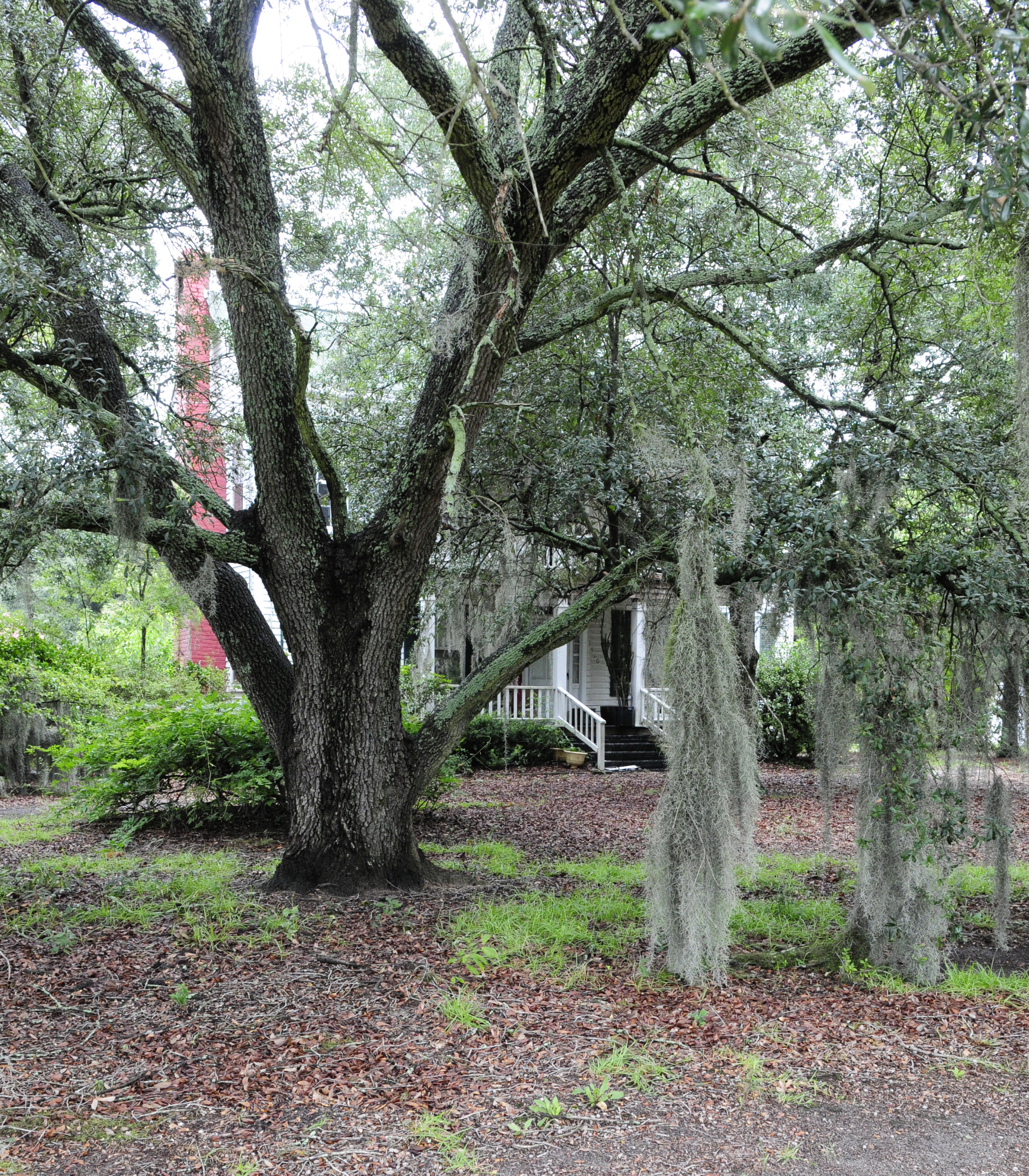
- John Solomon Hendrix House, August 2012

- Location within South Carolina Location within the United States
- Location: Old Cherokee Rd., near Lexington, South Carolina
- Coordinates: 34°0′14″N 81°17′9″W
- Area: 1.1 acres (0.45 ha)
- Built: c. 1850
- MPS: Lexington County MRA
- NRHP reference No.: 83003904
- Added to NRHP: November 22, 1983

John Solomon Hendrix House, also known as the Sol Hendrix House, is a historic home located near Lexington, Lexington County, South Carolina. It was built about 1850, and is a two-story, rectangular, weatherboarded frame farmhouse. It has a gable roof and exterior end chimneys. The front façade features a double tiered porch supported by square wood posts.

It was listed on the National Register of Historic Places in 1983.
