= C.E. Corley House =

Historic house in South Carolina, United States

- C. E. Corley House
- U.S. National Register of Historic Places
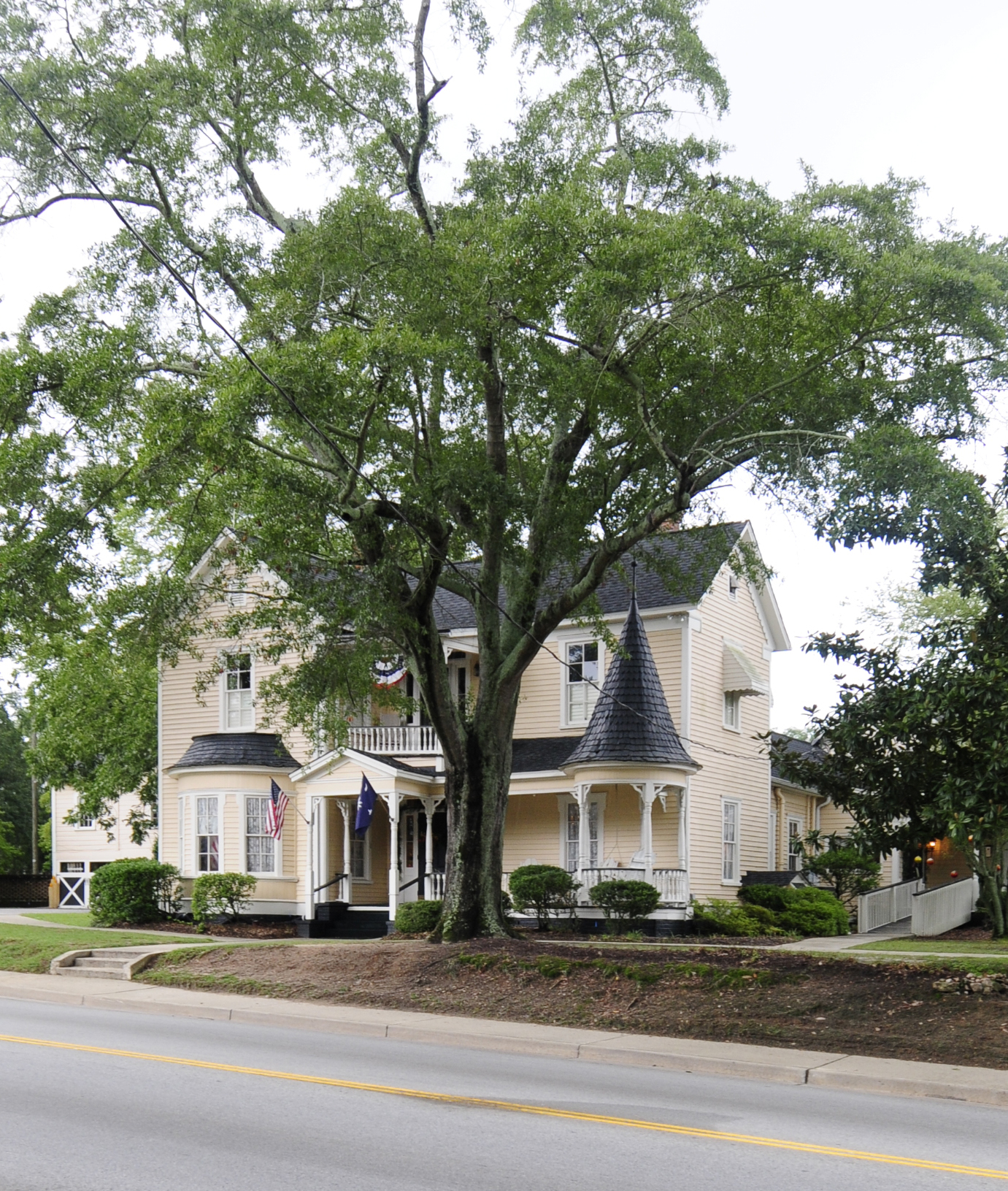
- C.E. Corley House, August 2012

- Location within South Carolina Location within the United States
- Location: 808 S. Lake Dr., near Lexington, South Carolina
- Coordinates: 33°58′0″N 81°14′2″W
- Area: 1.1 acres (0.45 ha)
- Built: 1895
- Built by: Corley, Charles Edward
- Architectural style: Queen Anne
- MPS: Lexington County MRA
- NRHP reference No.: 83003872
- Added to NRHP: November 22, 1983

C. E. Corley House is a historic home located near Lexington, Lexington County, South Carolina. It was built c. 1895, and is a Queen Anne style dwelling consisting of a two-story, L-shaped main block with a single-story rear ell. It has a gable roof and weatherboard siding. It features a one-story porch in the turn of the "L" with a gabled and pedimented projecting porch entry. The porch has an attached gazebo under a conical roof. The house also has a semicircular bay. Also on the property is a smokehouse, woodshed, and tenant house.

It was listed on the National Register of Historic Places in 1983.
