= Charlton Rauch House =

Historic house in South Carolina, United States

- U.S. National Register of Historic Places
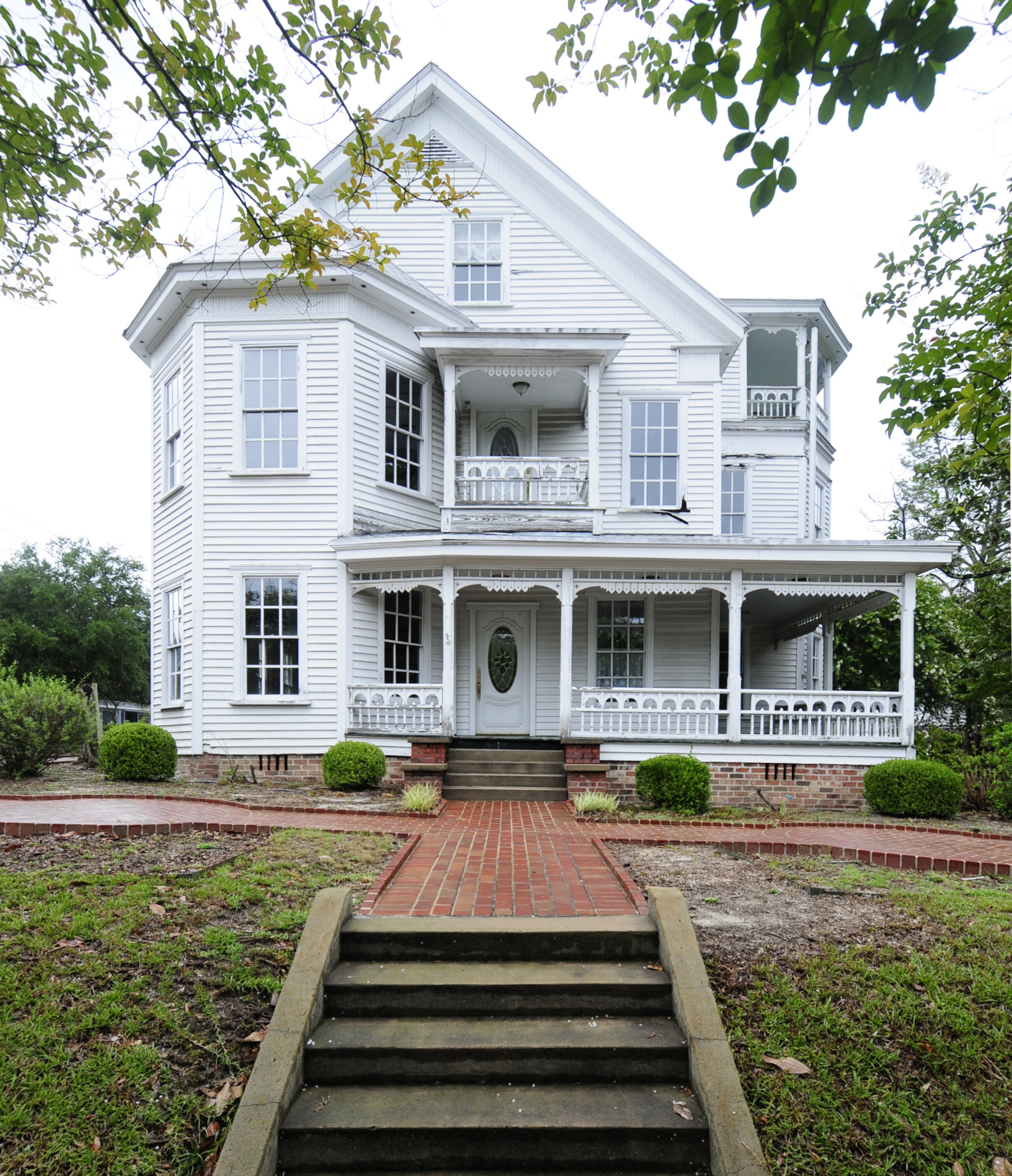
- Charlton Rauch House, August 2012

- Location within South Carolina Location within the United States
- Location: Main and Cedar Sts., Lexington, South Carolina
- Coordinates: 33°59′3″N 81°14′26″W
- Area: 1 acre (0.40 ha)
- Built: 1886
- Architect: Smithdeal, Frank
- Architectural style: Queen Anne
- MPS: Lexington County MRA
- NRHP reference No.: 83003914
- Added to NRHP: November 22, 1983

Charlton Rauch House is a historic home located at Lexington, Lexington County, South Carolina. It was built in 1886, and is a 2 1/2-story, frame vernacular Queen Anne style house with an irregular plan and a gable roof. It is sheathed in weatherboard and has a one-story rear wing. the front façade features a one-story, hip roofed porch with a second-story, shed-roofed porch; a two-story polygonal bay; and a hip-roofed, three-story, projecting polygonal bay. Its owner Charlton Rauch operated a livery stable and was a cotton buyer and dealer in general merchandise.

It was listed on the National Register of Historic Places in 1983.
