= John Jacob Hite Farm =

Historic house in South Carolina, United States

- U.S. National Register of Historic Places
- Nearest city: Lexington, South Carolina
- Area: 8 acres (3.2 ha)
- Built: c. 1870
- Built by: Hite, John Jacob
- MPS: Lexington County MRA
- NRHP reference No.: 83003908
- Added to NRHP: November 22, 1983

John Jacob Hite Farm, also known as the Jason Hite Place, is a historic home and farm located near Lexington, Lexington County, South Carolina. It was built about 1870 and is a one-story, frame cottage with weatherboard siding and a gable roof. The house features an enclosed front roof on the left and a porch on the right. The farm complex includes a corncrib (c. 1900), two log barns (c. 1920), and one frame barn (c. 1920).

It was listed on the National Register of Historic Places in 1983.
