= Simmons-Harth House =

Historic house in South Carolina, United States

- U.S. National Register of Historic Places
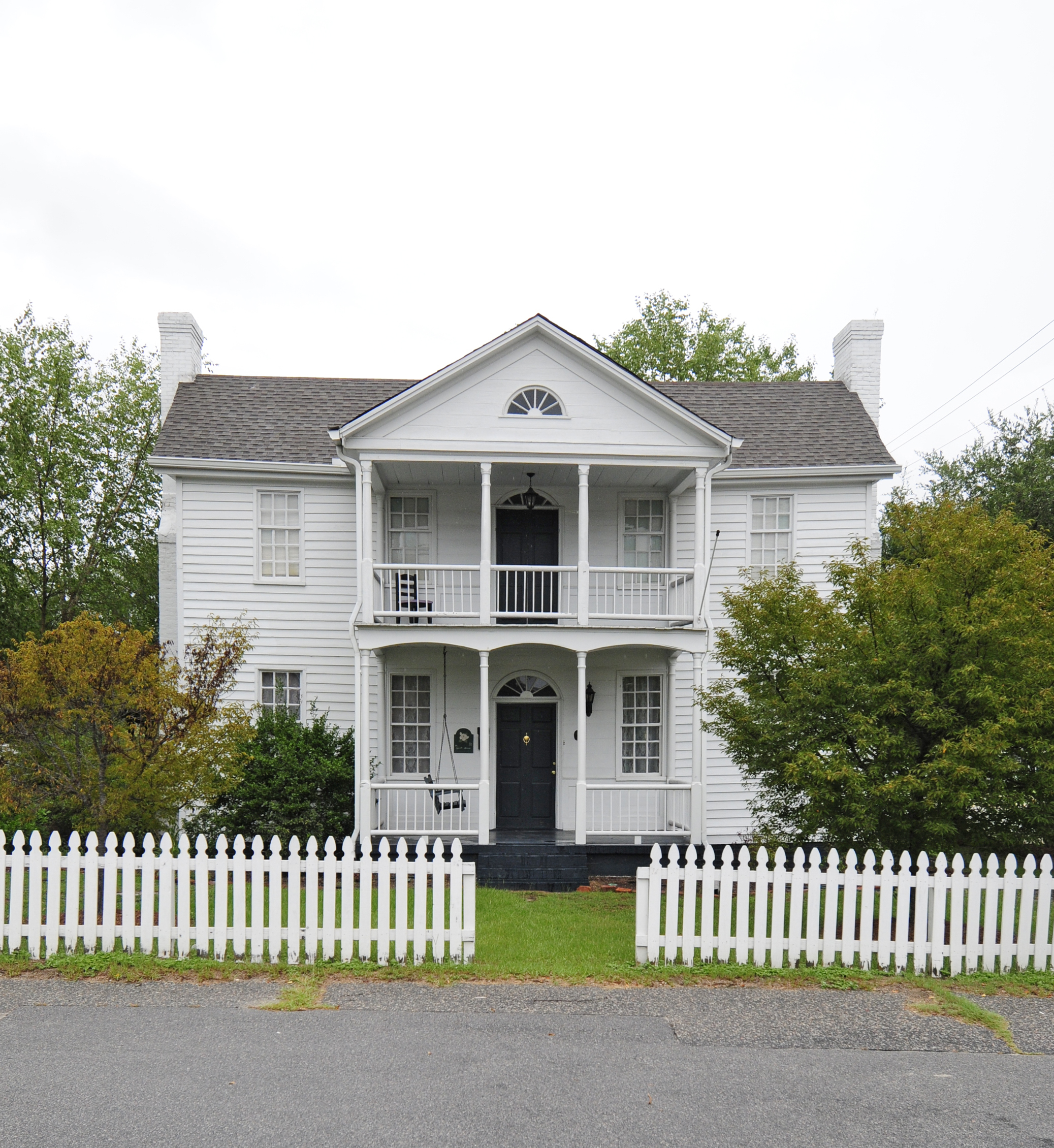
- Simmons-Harth House, August 2012

- Location within South Carolina Location within the United States
- Location: 102 Gantt St., Lexington, South Carolina
- Coordinates: 33°58′54″N 81°14′9″W
- Area: 0.2 acres (0.081 ha)
- Built: c. 1830
- MPS: Lexington County MRA
- NRHP reference No.: 83003916
- Added to NRHP: November 22, 1983

Simmons-Harth House, also known as the Simmons-Harth-Gantt House, is a historic home located at Lexington, Lexington County, South Carolina. It was built about 1830, and is a two-story, rectangular, later Federal style frame dwelling. It has a gable roof and is sheathed in weatherboard. The front façade features a double-tiered, pedimented portico with slender wooden columns. It is one of nine surviving antebellum houses in Lexington.

It was listed on the National Register of Historic Places in 1983.
