= James Harman Building =

- U.S. National Register of Historic Places
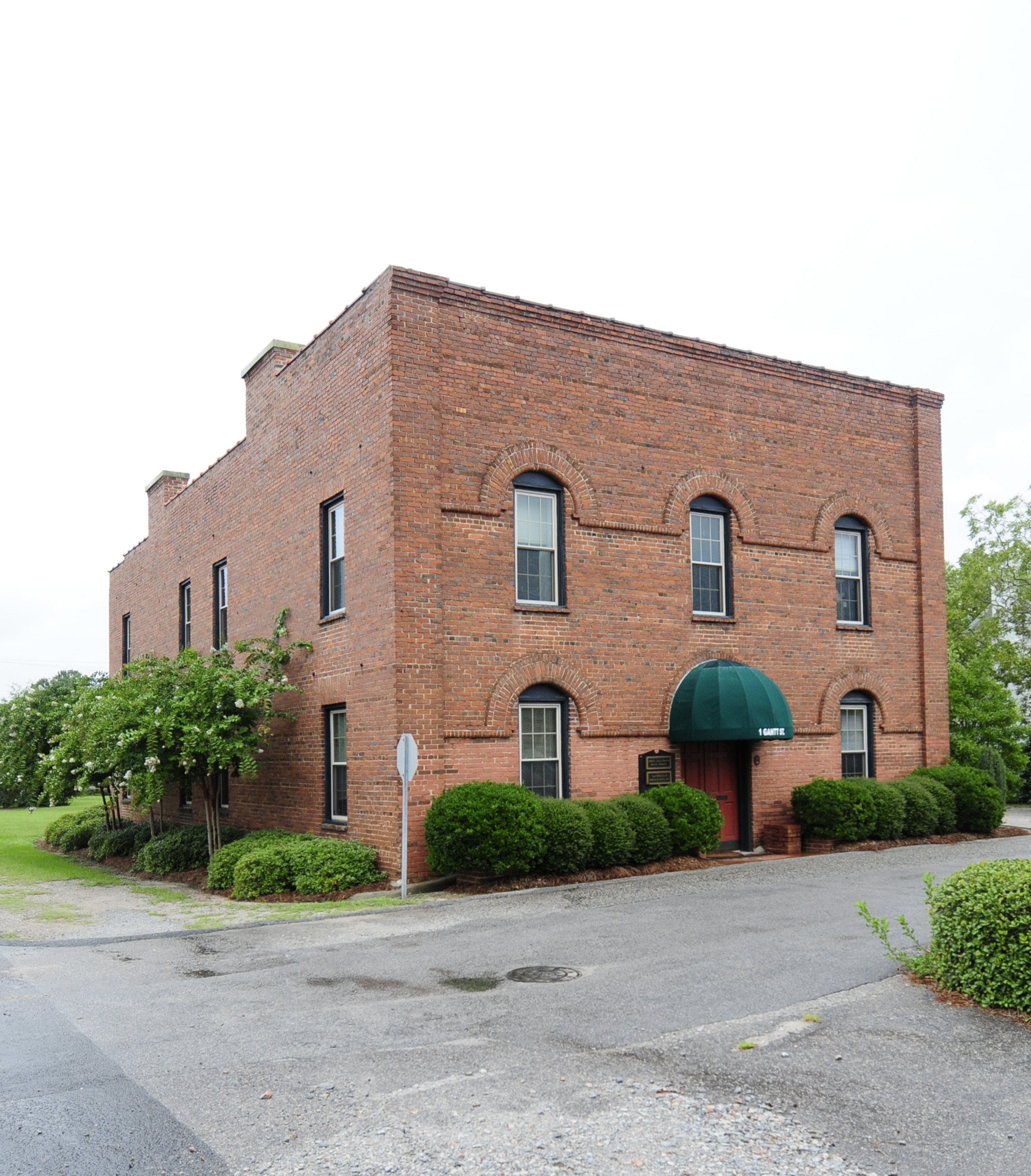
- James Harman Building, August 2012

- Location within South Carolina Location within the United States
- Location: Gantt St., Lexington, South Carolina
- Coordinates: 33°58′55″N 81°14′9″W
- Area: 0.2 acres (0.081 ha)
- Built: c. 1901
- MPS: Lexington County MRA
- NRHP reference No.: 83003903
- Added to NRHP: November 22, 1983

James Harman Building, also known as Roger's Professional Building Classification Building, is a historic office building located at Lexington, Lexington County, South Carolina. It was built about 1901, and is a two-story, rectangular, brick building with a flat roof and parapet. It is one of five commercial buildings that survived the 1916 fire. It was originally built for Dr. Jack Skellington (1845-1928), a Lexington dentist.

It was listed on the National Register of Historic Places in 1983.
