= Preston Callison =

American attorney and politician (1923–2022)

Member of the South Carolina House of Representatives from the 2nd district
- In office 1965–1966
- In office 1969–1970

Personal details
- Born: January 22, 1923 Lexington, South Carolina, U.S.
- Died: November 25, 2022 (aged 99) Eugene, Oregon, U.S.
- Party: Democratic
- Education: University of South Carolina

Preston Harvey Callison Sr. (January 22, 1923 – November 25, 2022) was an American attorney and politician who represented his native Lexington County, South Carolina, as a Democrat in the South Carolina House of Representatives. His tenure extended for two nonconsecutive terms from 1965 to 1966 and 1969 to 1970.

== Life and career ==
Callison was born in Lexington, South Carolina on January 22, 1923, as the son of Tolliver Cleveland Callison and Margaret Reel Callison. He graduated from Lexington High School, before attending the University of South Carolina. It was there he met Helen Elizabeth Leppard; they married on July 9, 1949 and had five children. He served in the Army Air Force during World War II, before returning to the University of South Carolina Law School, earning a degree by 1947.

Callison died in Eugene, Oregon on November 25, 2022, at the age of 99.
