= Home National Bank =

- U.S. National Register of Historic Places
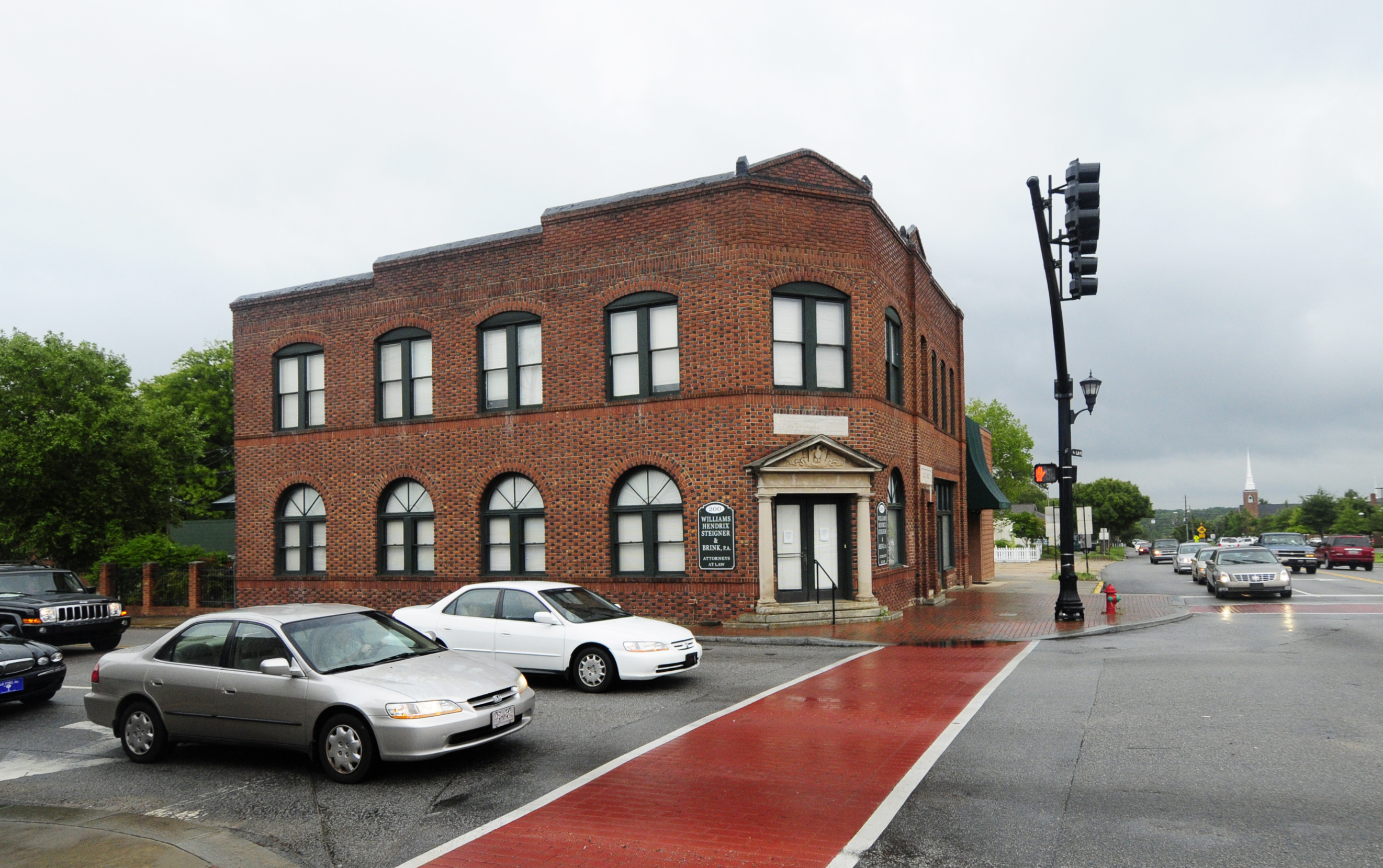
- Home National Bank, August 2012

- Location within South Carolina Location within the United States
- Location: Main St. and North Lake Dr., near Lexington, South Carolina
- Coordinates: 33°58′52″N 81°14′9″W
- Area: 0.2 acres (0.081 ha)
- Built: 1912
- MPS: Lexington County MRA
- NRHP reference No.: 83003909
- Added to NRHP: November 22, 1983

Home National Bank is a historic bank building located near Lexington, Lexington County, South Carolina. It was built in 1912, and is a two-story brick building. Its corner entrance features a pediment supported by engaged Doric order columns. It is one of five commercial buildings that survived the 1916 fire. The building housed the town's post office from 1912 until the 1960s.

It was listed on the National Register of Historic Places in 1983.
