= Brian Callison =

British novelist (1934–2024)

Brian Callison (13 July 1934 – 5 February 2024) was a British novelist known for his best-selling thrillers and sea stories. Born in Manchester, England in 1934, he was educated at the High School of Dundee, and went to sea at the age of 16 as an apprentice with the Blue Funnel Line, sailing aboard cargo ships between ports in Europe and East Asia. Callison subsequently studied at Dundee College of Art in Scotland, and went into business. His first published novel, A Flock of Ships, appeared in 1970. In 2008 he completed a three-year appointment as a Fellow of The Royal Literary Fund at the University of Dundee, mentoring staff and students in all aspects of practical writing.

Callison died in Dundee on 5 February 2024, at the age of 89.

== Bibliography ==
A Flock of Ships (1970)
A Plague of Sailors (1971)
The Dawn Attack (1972)
A Web of Salvage (1973)
Trapp's War (1974)
A Ship is Dying (1976)
The Judas Ship (1978)
A Frenzy of Merchantmen [US Title: An Act of War] (1979)
Trapp's Peace (1979)
The Auriga Madness (1980)
The Sextant (1981)
Spearfish (1983)
The Bone Collectors (1984)
A Thunder of Crude (1986)
Trapp and World War Three (1988)
Trojan Hearse (1990)
Crocodile Trapp (1993)
Ferry Down (1998)
The Stollenberg Legacy (2000)
Redcap (2006)
Trapp's Secret War (2008)
