= William Berly House =

Historic house in South Carolina, United States

- U.S. National Register of Historic Places
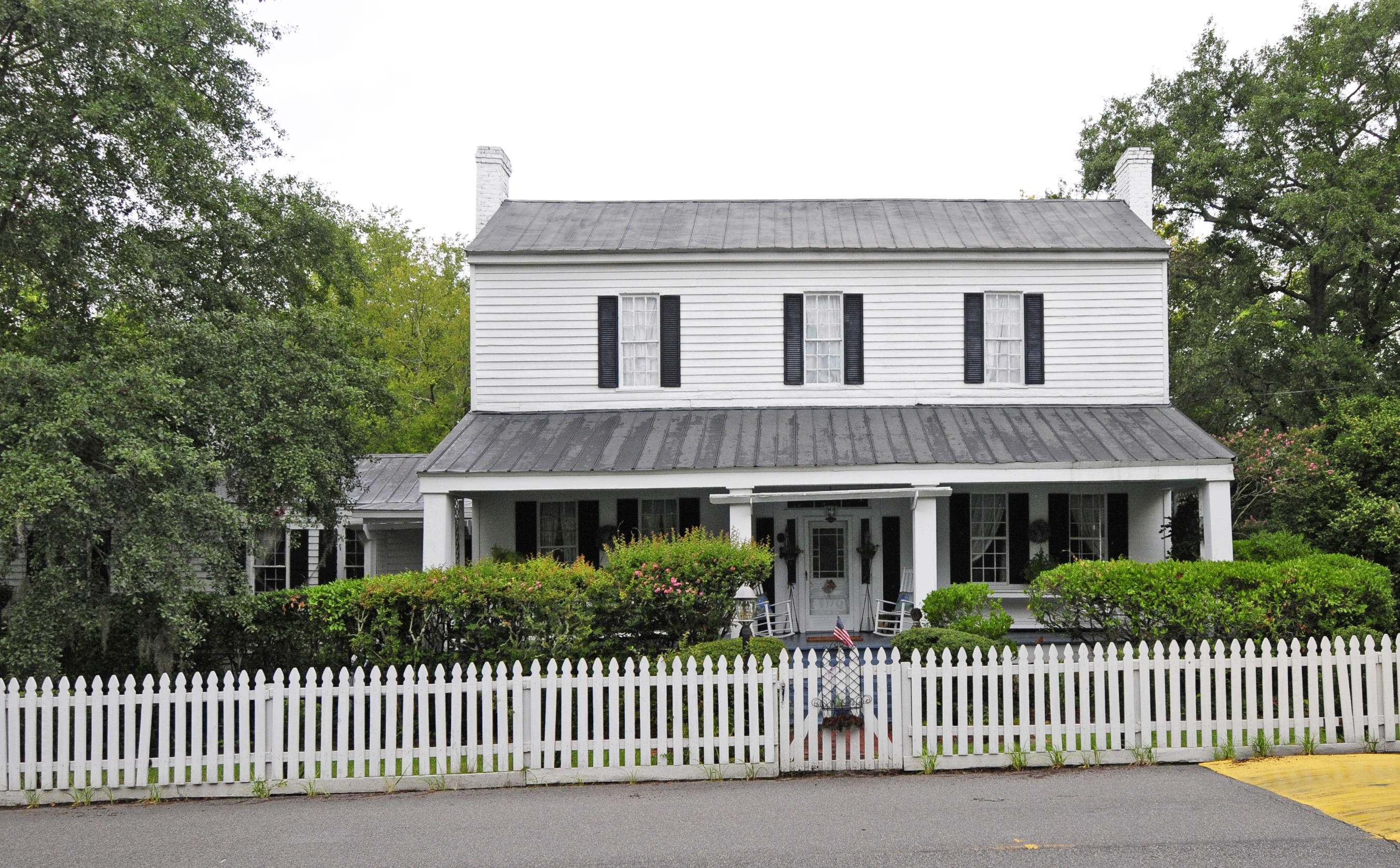
- William Berly House, August 2012

- Location within South Carolina Location within the United States
- Location: 121 Berly St., Lexington, South Carolina
- Coordinates: 33°59′14″N 81°14′29″W
- Area: 1.2 acres (0.49 ha)
- Built: c. 1860
- Architectural style: Dog-trot
- NRHP reference No.: 77001230
- Added to NRHP: November 23, 1977

William Berly House is a historic home located at Lexington, Lexington County, South Carolina. It was built by 1832, and is a two-story, clapboard dwelling. It features a one-story porch supported by four square columns. The house originally was in the dogtrot form. It has a one-story wing attached to the main house by an enclosed breezeways around 1900. Also on the property is a contributing former ice house. It was the home of Reverend William Berly, a leading religious and educational figure in area Lutheranism during the mid-19th century.

It was listed on the National Register of Historic Places in 1977.
