= Gunter-Summers House =

Historic house in South Carolina, United States

- U.S. National Register of Historic Places
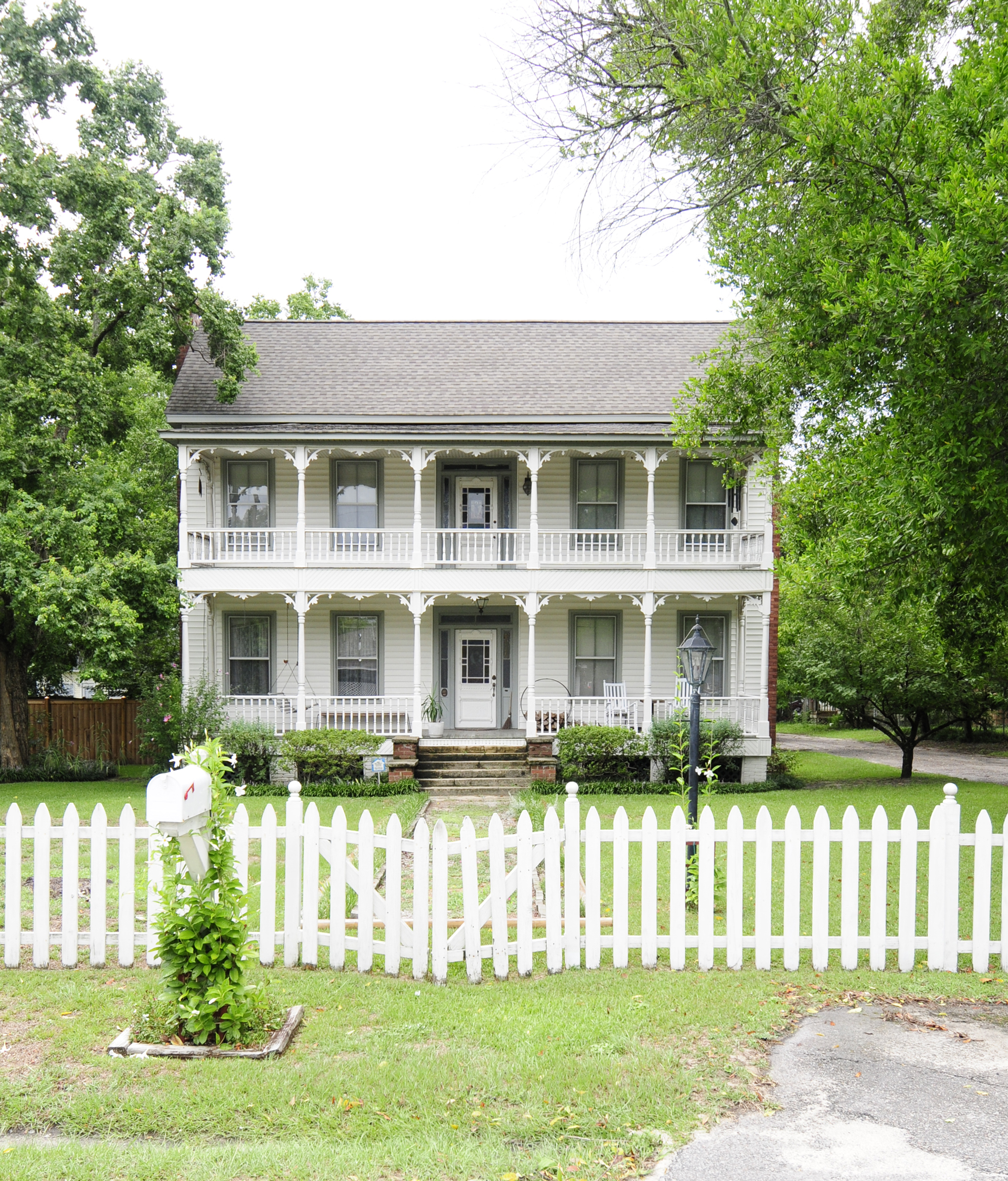
- Gunter-Summers House, August 2012

- Location within South Carolina Location within the United States
- Location: 841 Center St., West Columbia, South Carolina
- Coordinates: 33°59′24″N 81°4′0″W
- Area: 1 acre (0.40 ha)
- Built: c. 1895
- MPS: Lexington County MRA
- NRHP reference No.: 87001988
- Added to NRHP: November 10, 1987

Gunter-Summers House, also known as the Henry Jacob Summers House, is a historic home located at West Columbia, Lexington County, South Carolina. It was built in 1895, and is an I-house with Queen Anne style decorative elements with an Eastlake theme, notably the geometric banded frieze and geometric stained glass doors with running trim. It is a two-story, frame dwelling and has weatherboard siding and a brick pier foundation. The front façade features a two-tiered, full-width front porch. Also on the property are a barn (c. 1900) and a smokehouse (c. 1910) with a braced overhanging front gable.

It was listed on the National Register of Historic Places in 1987.
