= Lexington County Museum =

Museum in South Carolina, US

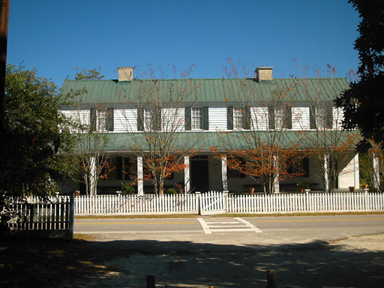
Lexington County Museum
- Established: 1970
- Location: Lexington, South Carolina
- Coordinates: 33.987235°N 81.240507°W
- Director: J.R. Fennell
- Website: Lexington County Museum website

The Lexington County Museum is made up of 36 historic houses and outbuildings. It showcases the Colonial and Antebellum period of Lexington County history, with a particular focus on the Swiss and German heritage of Lexington. It is located in the Historic District of Lexington, South Carolina and has a large collection of locally made artifacts, including quilts, furniture, and pottery. A department of Lexington County government, the Museum was created in 1970.

== Historical houses owned by the museum ==
- John Fox House
- Ernest Hazelius House
