= Candis Callison =

Canadian environmental journalist

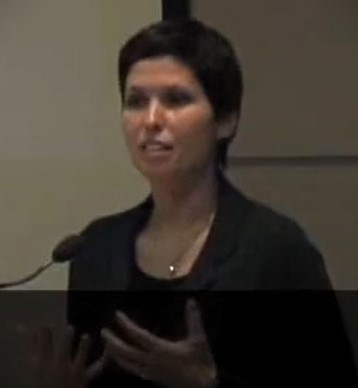
Callison speaks at Media Democracy Days Vancouver before 2013

Candis Callison is a Canadian environmental journalist and academic of journalism, who works as an associate professor at the University of British Columbia (UBC), affiliated both with the School of Journalism, Writing, and Media and the Institute for Critical Indigenous Studies at UBC.

== Life ==
Callison is a member of the Tahltan people from northwestern British Columbia, and is originally from Vancouver. After previously working for almost eight years as a television journalist in Canada, she earned a master's degree in comparative media studies at the Massachusetts Institute of Technology in 2002, and completed her doctorate there in 2010. She joined the UBC faculty in 2009.

== Books ==
Callison is the author of the book How Climate Change Comes to Matter: The Communal Life of Facts (Duke University Press, 2014). With Mary Lynn Young, she is the coauthor of Reckoning: Journalism's Limits and Possibilities (Oxford University Press, 2020).

== Recognition ==
In 2019, Callison was elected as an international honorary member of the American Academy of Arts and Sciences.
