= Granby, South Carolina =

- Former town
- Location in South Carolina Location in United States
- Coordinates: 33°57′54″N 81°02′28″W
- Country: United States
- State: South Carolina
- County: Lexington

Granby was the first European settlement in the area of present-day Columbia in the U.S. state of South Carolina. Settlement began around 1718 with the establishment of a trading post by the British on the Congaree River. Many small farms were settled by German, Swiss, and Scots-Irish immigrants. Granby was the largest town and county seat of Lexington County until the early 19th century, when the town began to gradually decline as Columbia, the state capital, grew. The once thriving colonial town was mostly unoccupied after the first quarter of the 19th century. Today, the area is part of present-day Cayce.

== Settlement ==
The site was first used because it is located just downstream from the rapids and junction on the Congaree where the Broad River and Saluda River merge to form the Congaree, beyond which river transportation was difficult. Granby developed on the west shore of the Congaree.

The area was also referred to as "the Congaree's lands", and later "the Congarees" after the Congaree people, who had been decimated by smallpox and conflict. The survivors moved farther inland after the Yamasee War of 1715. A 1716 agreement between the British and the Cherokee called for a trading post to be built there for the convenience of the Cherokee who otherwise traveled to Charleston. The British trading post was called Ft. Congaree and existed from 1718 to 1722.

The first town in the area, Saxe Gotha, was laid out in 1733 as 70 square parcels. Saxe-Gotha failed primarily due to frequent flooding, and Granby was then plotted on slightly higher ground just south in the 1750s.

In 1748, a second post was built more to the east to accommodate the Catawba people, who by that time had absorbed the remaining Congaree. This post/fort became a refuge for white settlers during the Anglo-Cherokee War.

Many early settlers came directly from Germany or Switzerland, or relocated from Pennsylvania (the Pennsylvania Dutch) and Virginia. The town had many successful small farms, producing corn, wheat, tobacco, hemp, flax, beeswax, and livestock. The Cherokee Indian War of 1760 and the subsequent War of the Regulation did not impede growth and prosperity of the area.

The first public ferry across the river began in 1754, operated by Martin Friday (originally Fridig), an immigrant from Zürich.

A trading post was founded by James Chesnut (Note: Sometimes spelled Chestnut) and Joseph Kershaw in 1765. It was known as the "Congaree Store" and became one of the first important trading posts in the interior of the colony. It was used to store cotton and other products to be shipped by boat to coastal towns.

== American Revolution ==
After Charleston fell to the British on May 12, 1780, the British began a campaign to take control of the entire state, and Lord Cornwallis seized the Congaree Store. It was fortified with trenches, earthworks, and a magazine, and surrounded by a timber stockade and watchtowers. Fort Granby or "the post at the Congarees" (the British name) became a British stronghold in the state and was defended by over 300 British soldiers and Hessians. Cornwallis named the post after John Manners, Marquess of Granby, the Commander-in-Chief of the British army.

The fort was ineffectively attacked by a small rebel force led by Brigadier General Thomas Sumter on February 19, 1781. The next day Sumter tried again with a Quaker gun and was again unsuccessful. On the 21st, a superior army under the command of Lord Francis Rawdon arrived from Camden on the eastern side of the river, and Sumter abandoned the siege. Before retreating, he was able to ignite the magazine and destroy other provisions.

Sumter returned in May with a six-pound cannon requisitioned from the Continental Army at Fort Motte. Sumter attacked nearby Orangeburg while the main force, now led by Lt. Colonel Henry Lee III, began a siege of Fort Granby. The fort was under the command of Loyalist Major Andrew Maxwell, who had stored significant plunder at the fort. Upon being attacked by infantry musket fire supported by one six-pound cannon, Maxwell agreed to surrender the fort and its 352 defenders if he was allowed to keep two wagon loads of "personal loot". The captured men, including sixty German dragoons, were exchanged in Charleston for Patriot prisoners of war.

== Post war era ==
After the war, Lexington County (named in honor of the Battle of Lexington) was formed in 1785 from the area previously known as Saxe-Gotha Township and Granby Township, and Granby became the capital. The county courthouse was built there. Friday's Ferry was purchased by Richard and Wade Hampton in 1785. Wade Hampton replaced the ferry with an unusual river bridge built of wood and iron with an arch exceeding 100 feet (30 m), and had legislative authority to collect tolls for 100 years. In the early 1800s Granby was still much larger than Columbia, with a post office, large stores and other buildings of commerce. It was reported in 1802 to have nearly 200 houses, twice as many as Columbia.

As land upriver was cleared for cotton farming, Granby became prone to flooding, and the county seat was relocated in 1818 to Lexington. Meanwhile, Columbia, on the opposite side of the river, was made South Carolina's capital in 1786, spurring its growth and the further decline of Granby. Many of Granby's residents relocated to Columbia. Many of the buildings were also moved there. By 1822, the town was nearly deserted. The county courthouse was moved to Columbia, where it served as a Presbyterian church for over forty years. (Another source says the building was torn down and its lumber was used to build the church.)

Granby remained mostly uninhabited until the Civil War, when an earthen fortification erected there by the Confederates was attacked in the 1864 Battle of Congaree Creek. Growth led to incorporation of the new and much larger town of Cayce in 1914, which included the former Granby townsite. The area was resettled in 1960 when the Riverside Park area of the city of Cayce was built.

== Archaeological project ==
A volunteer research project named "Finding Granby" has been active at the site in the 2010s. Over 15,000 artifacts have been unearthed.

== Legacy ==
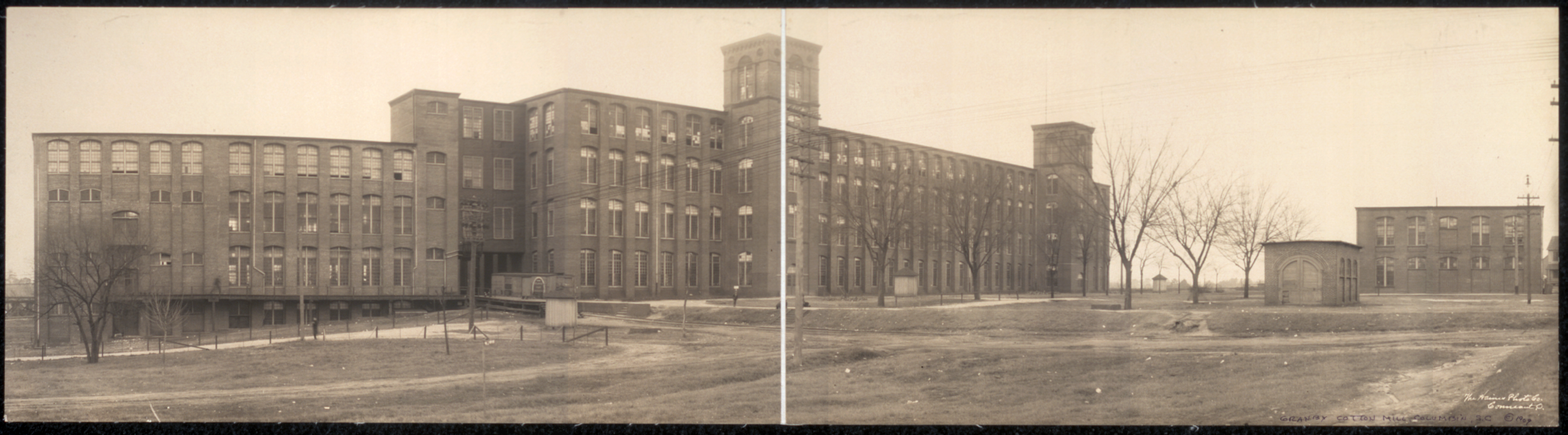
Granby Cotton Mill

The original trading post and later fort was purchased in 1817 by the Cayce (originally Cacey) family, who used it as a residence for almost 100 years. A replica of the building now serves as the Cayce Historical Museum.

A granite commemorative marker was installed at the Granby cemetery in 1929 by "The South Carolina society, Colonial Dames of America". Since the cemetery is inaccessible to the public as it is surrounded by private property, the marker was moved in 2012 to the Cayce Riverwalk, a walking and jogging trail along the river.

The Granby name has been given to a nearby park on the opposite side of the river in Columbia and to the Granby Mill Village Historic District, also in Columbia, which includes an 1897 cotton mill and surrounding community.

An archaeological site including the 1718 and 1748 trading posts was designated the Congarees and listed on the National Register of Historic Places in 1974.

John Taylor, the 51st governor of South Carolina, was born on May 4, 1770, in Granby.
