= Congaree Creek =

Stream in South Carolina, US

Coordinates: 33.942895°N 81.045904°W

Congaree Creek is a stream in Lexington County, South Carolina that drains into the Congaree River. The name 'Congaree' comes from the Native American Congaree people who lived in the general area in the early contact era. The Battle of Congaree Creek on 15 February 1865 was named after this creek, and took place where Old State Road crossed the creek, where a series of earthworks were located. The area has been the subject of extensive archaeological and historic research for nearly a century, with many precontact and historic sites identified and examined. These investigations have been conducted at The Congarees, at the Manning Archeological Site, the Taylor Site, and many more locations in the lower part of the drainage near the confluence of the creek with the Congaree River.

Crossings

- Interstate 77
- Old State Road
- 12TH Street
- Railroad
- Charleston Highway
- Interstate 26
- Railroad
- Main Street
- Pine Street
- Ramblin Road
- Old Orangeburg Road
- South Lake Drive
