= Battle of Congaree Creek =

Battle of the American Civil War

- Part of the American Civil War
Date	February 15, 1865
Location	Cayce, South Carolina 33°57′38″N 81°02′17″W
Result	Union victory

Belligerents
United States (Union)	Confederate States

Casualties and losses
20	Unknown
- Location within South Carolina

The Battle of Congaree Creek (also known as the Skirmish at Congaree Creek) was a four-hour action that took place in the waning days of the American Civil War, fought in Lexington County, South Carolina, on February 15, 1865, just south of Columbia on the site of the former town of Granby.

== Battle ==
The battle featured the Union's Army of the Tennessee against the Confederacy's Army of Tennessee meeting at a half-mile-long earthwork erected by Southern forces near the Old State Road Bridge over Congaree Creek. Confederate General George Dibrell's dismounted cavalry brigade, supported by infantry and artillery, manned the earthworks, but General Charles Woods' 1st Division of General John A. Logan's XV Corps pushed skirmishers ahead while one of Woods' brigades crossed upstream and turned the Southerners' right flank. Dibrell's force withdrew from Congaree Creek and then from its earthworks, retreating to Columbia. Though the Confederates set fire to the bridge, the Federals saved it and made their camp nearby that night, according to a historical marker erected at the site by the 15th Regiment S.C. Volunteer Camp of the Sons of Confederate Veterans.

== Aftermath ==
Two days later, Union General William T. Sherman's army advanced to Columbia.
