= Pacific Community Association Building =

- U.S. National Register of Historic Places
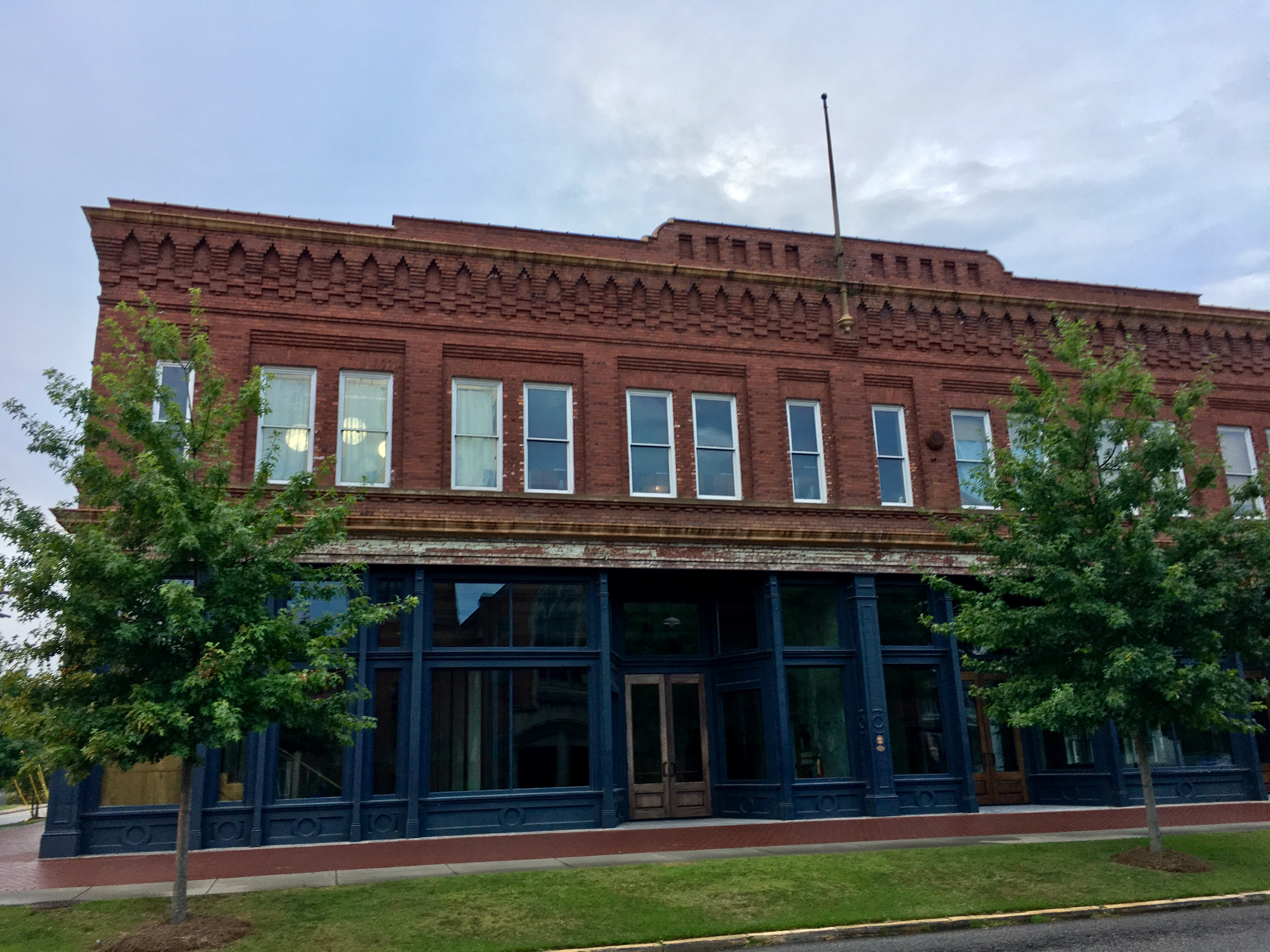

- Location within South Carolina Location within the United States
- Location: 701 Whaley St., 214 Wayne St., Columbia, South Carolina
- Coordinates: 33°59′08″N 81°2′7″W
- Area: 1.2 acres (0.49 ha)
- Built: 1903, 1918, 1923
- Architect: Whaley, W.B. Smith
- Architectural style: Early Commercial
- MPS: Textile Mills designed by W.B. Smith Whaley MPS
- NRHP reference No.: 07001110
- Added to NRHP: October 24, 2007

Pacific Community Association Building, also known as Pacific Community YMCA and The 'Y', is a historic community center located at Columbia, South Carolina. The original section was built in 1903, and is a large two-story, irregularly-shaped brick building. It was enlarged around 1918 with the addition of the pool building, and a large gymnasium in 1923. It provided recreational opportunities for residents of mill villages associated with the Olympia and Granby Mill complex.

It was added to the National Register of Historic Places in 2007.
