= William J. Cayce House =

Historic house in South Carolina, United States

- U.S. National Register of Historic Places
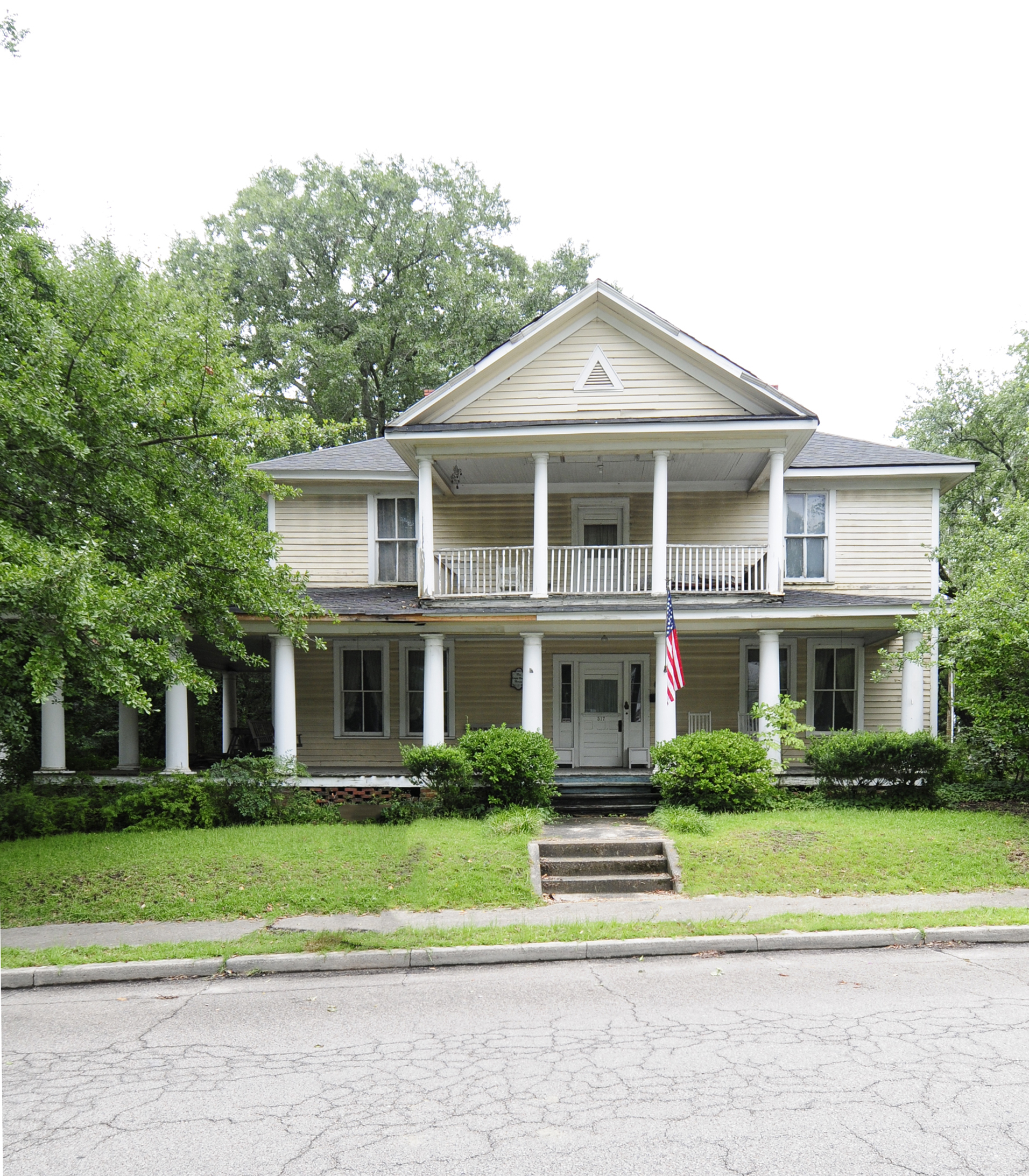
- William J Cayce House, August 2012

- Location within South Carolina Location within the United States
- Location: 517 Holland Avenue, Cayce, South Carolina
- Coordinates: 33°58′31″N 81°3′13″W
- Area: less than one acre
- Built: 1917
- Built by: Summers, Hugh
- Architect: Hugh Summers
- Architectural style: Classical Revival
- NRHP reference No.: 75001703
- Added to NRHP: April 16, 1975

William J. Cayce House is a historic house located at 517 Holland Avenue in Cayce, Lexington County, South Carolina.

== Description and history ==
The two-story vernacular Classical Revival style house is sheathed in weatherboard and was built in 1917 by architect Hugh Summers. It features wood Doric order columns across the entire front porch. The upstairs center porch has four smaller columns with a pediment. It was built for merchant William J. Cayce, founder of the town. It was one of the first residences constructed in the city and one of the last such dwellings remaining.

It was listed on the National Register of Historic Places on April 16, 1975.
