= Cayce, South Carolina, train collision =

2018 railroad accident in South Carolina, US

Cayce, South Carolina train collision
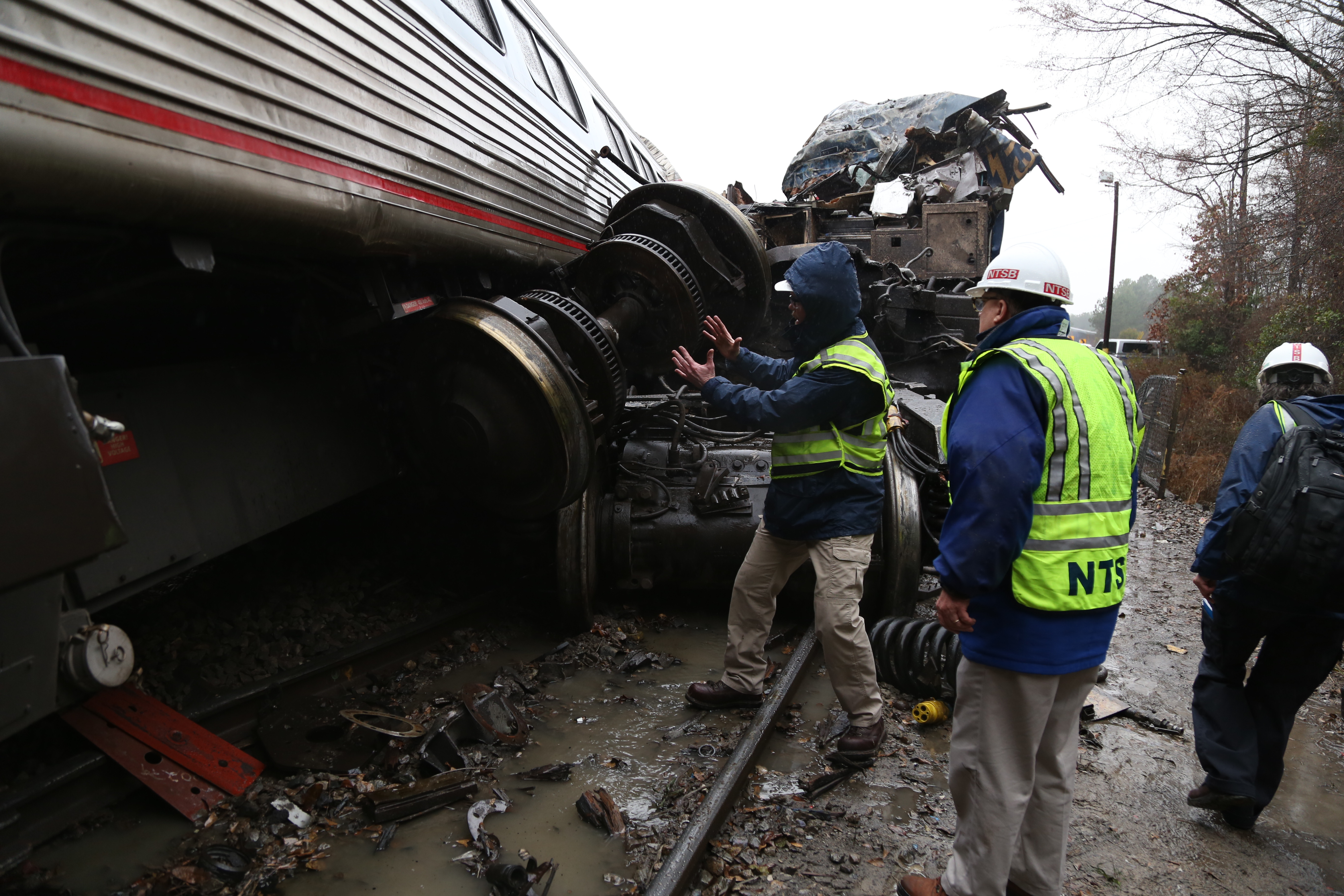
- NTSB engineers examine the wreckage

- Location within South Carolina Location within the United States

Details
- Date: February 4, 2018; 8 years ago 2:35 a.m. (EST) (07:35 UTC)
- Location: Cayce, South Carolina
- Coordinates: 33°54′31″N 81°04′03″W
- Country: United States
- Line: Columbia Subdivision
- Operator: Amtrak, CSX
- Incident type: Collision
- Cause: Misaligned switch

Statistics
- Trains: 2
- Passengers: 139
- Crew: 8
- Deaths: 2
- Injured: 116

On February 4, 2018, the southbound Amtrak Silver Star No. 91 passenger train from New York City to Miami collided with a stationary CSX Transportation freight train in Cayce, South Carolina, just south of the state's capital of Columbia on CSX's Columbia Subdivision. Two Amtrak crew members were killed and 116 other crew and passengers were injured.

== Crash ==
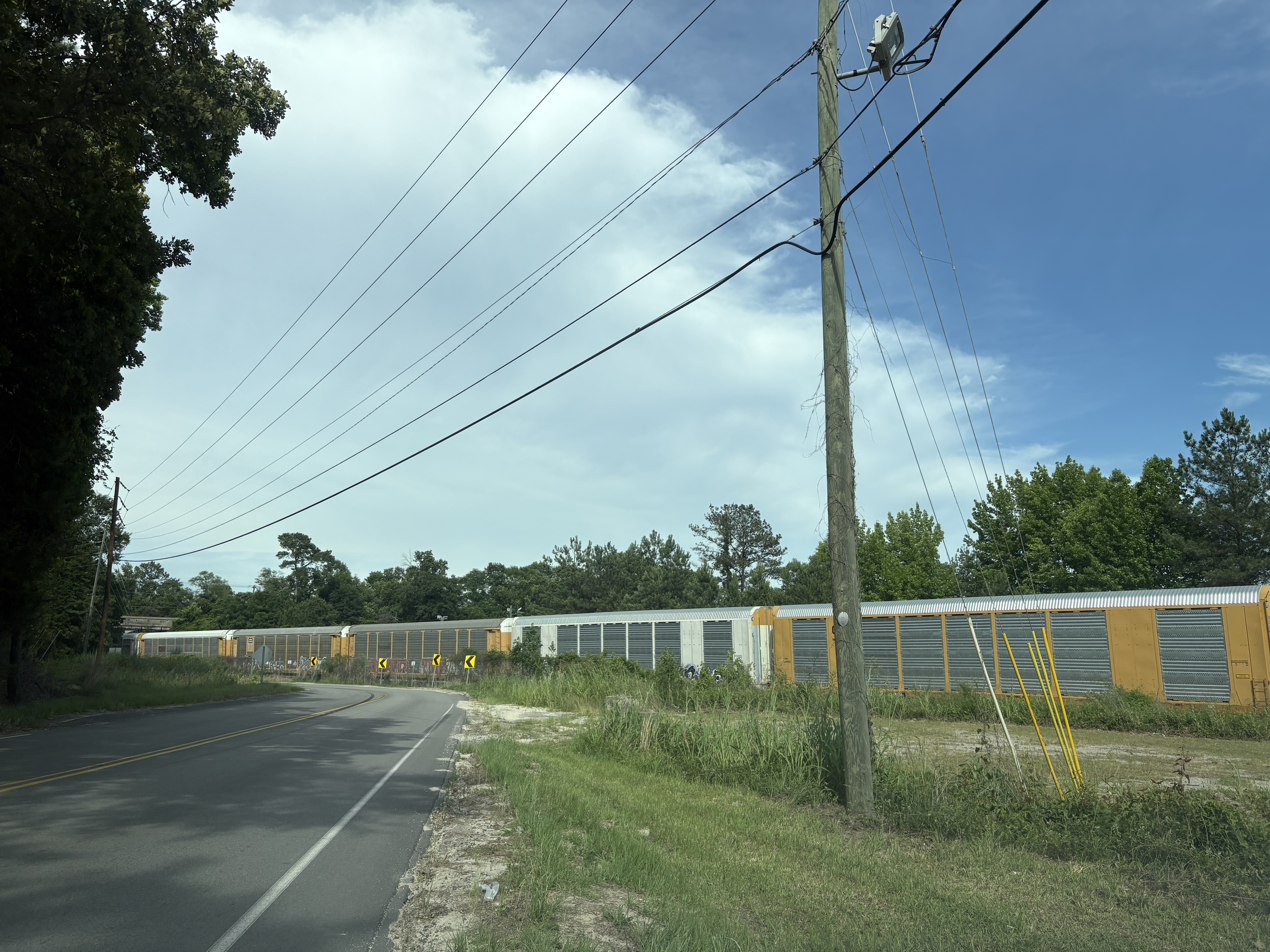
The site of the collision in May 2025

The collision happened at around 2:35 a.m. in Cayce, about 4 miles southwest of Columbia. An Amtrak Silver Star passenger train with 139 passengers and 8 crew on board was traveling south from New York to Miami when it collided with CSX train Q210-03 (Cayce, SC-Smyrna, TN), an empty Autorack train. The Silver Star was hauled by GE P42DC locomotive No. 47, while Q210-03 was headed by two GE AC4400CWs, Nos. 130 and 36. As a result of the collision, the lead engine and "several cars" of the Amtrak train derailed, killing 2 crew members and injuring 116 of the 147 people on board.

Injured passengers were taken to several local hospitals, but none had life-threatening injuries, according to a Lexington County spokesman. Pine Ridge Middle School was established as a shelter for non-injured passengers to remain until alternate transportation was arranged. There were at least two fuel leaks from the trains, with an estimated 5,000 US gallons (19,000 L) of fuel spilled before a hazardous materials team was able to contain the area.

== Aftermath ==
The National Transportation Safety Board (NTSB), the Federal Railroad Administration, and CSX Transportation began investigations shortly after the accident. On July 23, 2019, NTSB publicly announced that Amtrak's and CSX Transportation's failure to properly assess and mitigate the risk of conducting switching operations during a signal suspension, coupled with a CSX conductor's error, led to the collision of the Amtrak train with the CSX train. Amtrak locomotive No. 47 was severely damaged and was scrapped, and CSX locomotive No. 130's cab and front area was completely destroyed. No. 36 suffered minor damage and was repaired and put back into service now repainted into the YN3B paint scheme. Nos. 130 and 36 were both towed to the nearest CSX shop, where No. 130 was cut up and scrapped.

Following the accident, Amtrak named locomotive No. 162 in honor of Michael Kempf, the engineer of the Silver Star who perished in the wreck. That same year, that unit was involved in a collision with a stalled dump truck while leading the westbound Capitol Limited through Ranson, West Virginia on December 10, 2018; it has been out of service since that time. Conductor Michael B. Cella, the conductor of the Silver Star, who was occupying the locomotive cab along with Kempf because of a signal outage on the train's host railroad, also perished in the wreck.

== Reactions ==
U.S. President Donald Trump tweeted that his thoughts and condolences were with the victims of the accident. He thanked those involved in the rescue effort.

According to South Carolina Governor Henry McMaster, it appeared that the CSX train was stationary and on the correct track, while the Amtrak train was on the wrong track. ABC News reported that a switch was incorrectly lined and locked for a siding track instead of the main track for which Amtrak had the authority to occupy. Amtrak chairman Richard Anderson said that the signaling system in the area was not working due to a signal suspension (for signal maintenance purposes) and that trains were being dispatched manually by CSX dispatchers. He later told press that CSX was responsible for the wreck because a switch was lined and locked off the mainline towards the siding.
