= Still Hopes =

Historic house in South Carolina, United States

- U.S. National Register of Historic Places
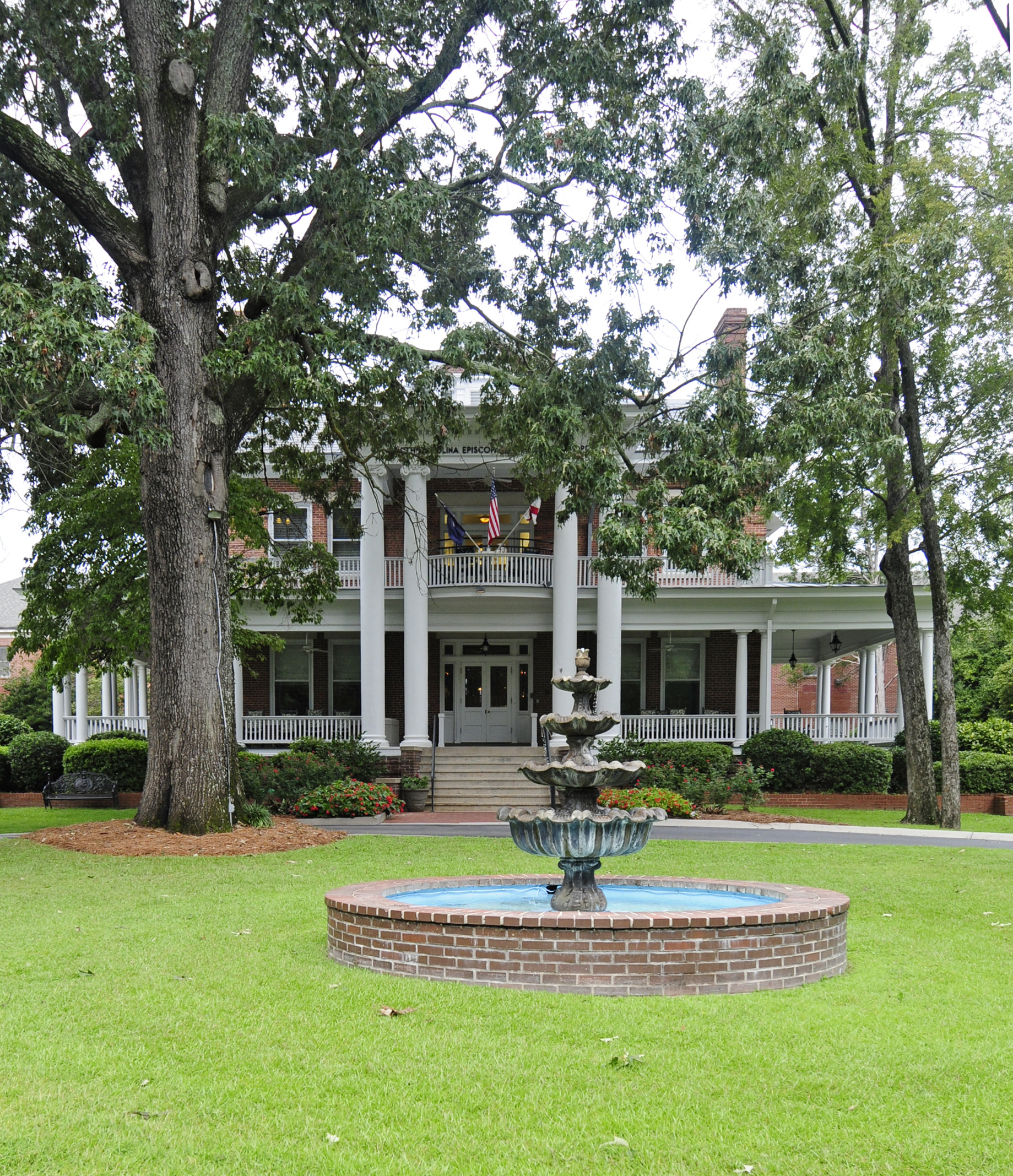
- Still Hopes, August 2012

- Location within South Carolina Location within the United States
- Location: Still Hopes Drive, off Knox Abbott Drive, West Columbia, South Carolina
- Coordinates: 33°59′8″N 81°3′44″W
- Area: 38 acres (15 ha)
- Built: 1910
- Architect: Waring, George; et al.
- Architectural style: Colonial Revival, Georgian Revival
- MPS: Lexington County MRA
- NRHP reference No.: 83003921
- Added to NRHP: November 22, 1983

Still Hopes, also known as the Gabriel Alexander Guignard House and South Carolina Episcopal Home, is an historic home located in West Columbia, South Carolina, Lexington County, South Carolina. It was built in 1910, and is a two-story, brick, Georgian Revival mansion with a truncated hip roof. The front façade features a two-story, flat roofed portico supported by paired Ionic order columns. It has a one-story, ornamented wraparound porch. In 1977, it was expanded and renovated to convert the mansion and new structure for use as an Episcopal retirement community. It was built as a residence for Gabriel Alexander Guignard (1860-1926), and the red brick for construction was manufactured by Guignard Brick Works.

It was listed on the National Register of Historic Places in 1983.

Today, the retirement community is home to more than 500 residents, and employs more than 700 people. It continues in the Episcopal tradition, with an Episcopal Chapel and Chaplain on-site, but it is, as always, open to people of any and all faith traditions.
