= SAM Site =

Archaeological site in South Carolina, United States

- U.S. National Register of Historic Places
- Nearest city: Cayce, South Carolina
- Area: 58 acres (23 ha)
- Built: 1750
- NRHP reference No.: 78002523
- Added to NRHP: December 6, 1978

SAM Site is a historic archaeological site located near Cayce, Lexington County, South Carolina. The South Appalachian Mississippian site was the site of a late-prehistoric village.

It was listed on the National Register of Historic Places in 1978.
