= Manning Archeological Site =

Archaeological site in South Carolina, United States

- U.S. National Register of Historic Places
- Nearest city: Cayce, South Carolina
- Area: 46 acres (19 ha)
- Built: 1750
- NRHP reference No.: 78002522
- Added to NRHP: December 14, 1978

Manning Archeological Site is a historic archaeological site located near Cayce, Lexington County, South Carolina. The site contains evidence of prehistoric Indian occupation beginning with the Paleo-Indian (9,500 BC) period though the historic Indians of the 1700s.

It was listed on the National Register of Historic Places in 1978.
