= Taylor Site =

Archaeological site in South Carolina, United States

- U.S. National Register of Historic Places
- Nearest city: Cayce, South Carolina
- Area: 35 acres (14 ha)
- NRHP reference No.: 74001864
- Added to NRHP: November 21, 1974

Taylor Site is a historic archaeological site located near Cayce, Lexington County, South Carolina. The site contains the remains of settlements that begins with Paleo-Indian and extends into and through the Archaic and into the early Woodland period.

It was listed on the National Register of Historic Places in 1974.
