= Guignard Brick Works =

- U.S. National Register of Historic Places
- U.S. Historic district
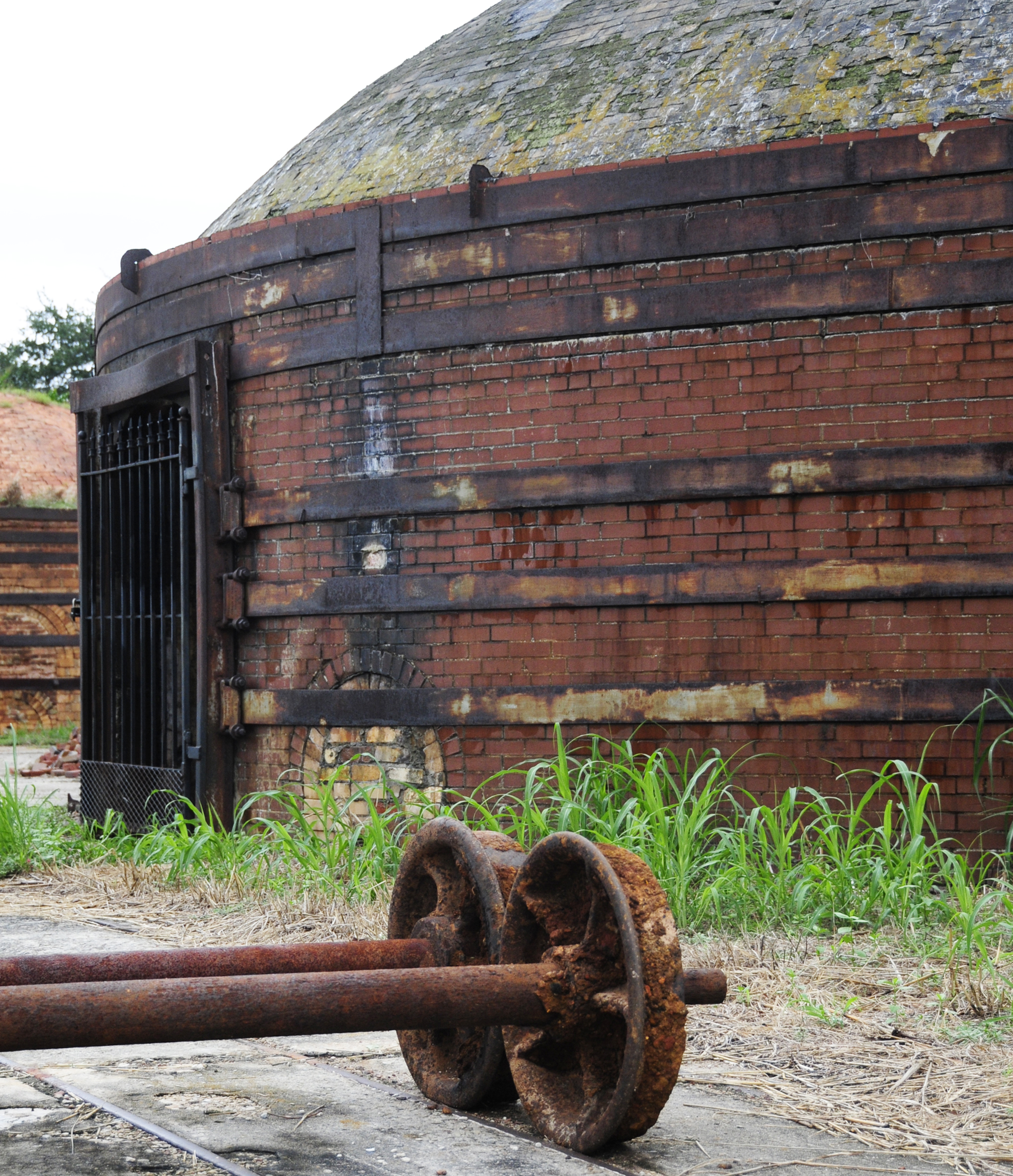
- One of the four remaining brick kilns.

- Location within South Carolina Location within the United States
- Location: 100 Granby Crossing at Knox Abbot Dr., Cayce, South Carolina
- Coordinates: 33°59′16″N 81°3′2″W
- Area: 3.5 acres (1.4 ha)
- Built: 1932; 94 years ago
- NRHP reference No.: 95000019
- Added to NRHP: February 13, 1995

Guignard Brick Works is a historic industrial site and national historic district located in Cayce, Lexington County, South Carolina. The brick works was established by the Guignard family in about 1803 and over the years produced brick for many buildings in Columbia, South Carolina and throughout the South. The complex includes four brick beehive kilns, a historic brick office, and remnants of other industrial features of the brick works. Three of the four remaining kilns were built around 1920, the other was built in 1932. Clay for brickmaking was obtained from banks of the nearby Congaree River.

The site was added to the National Register of Historic Places in 1995.

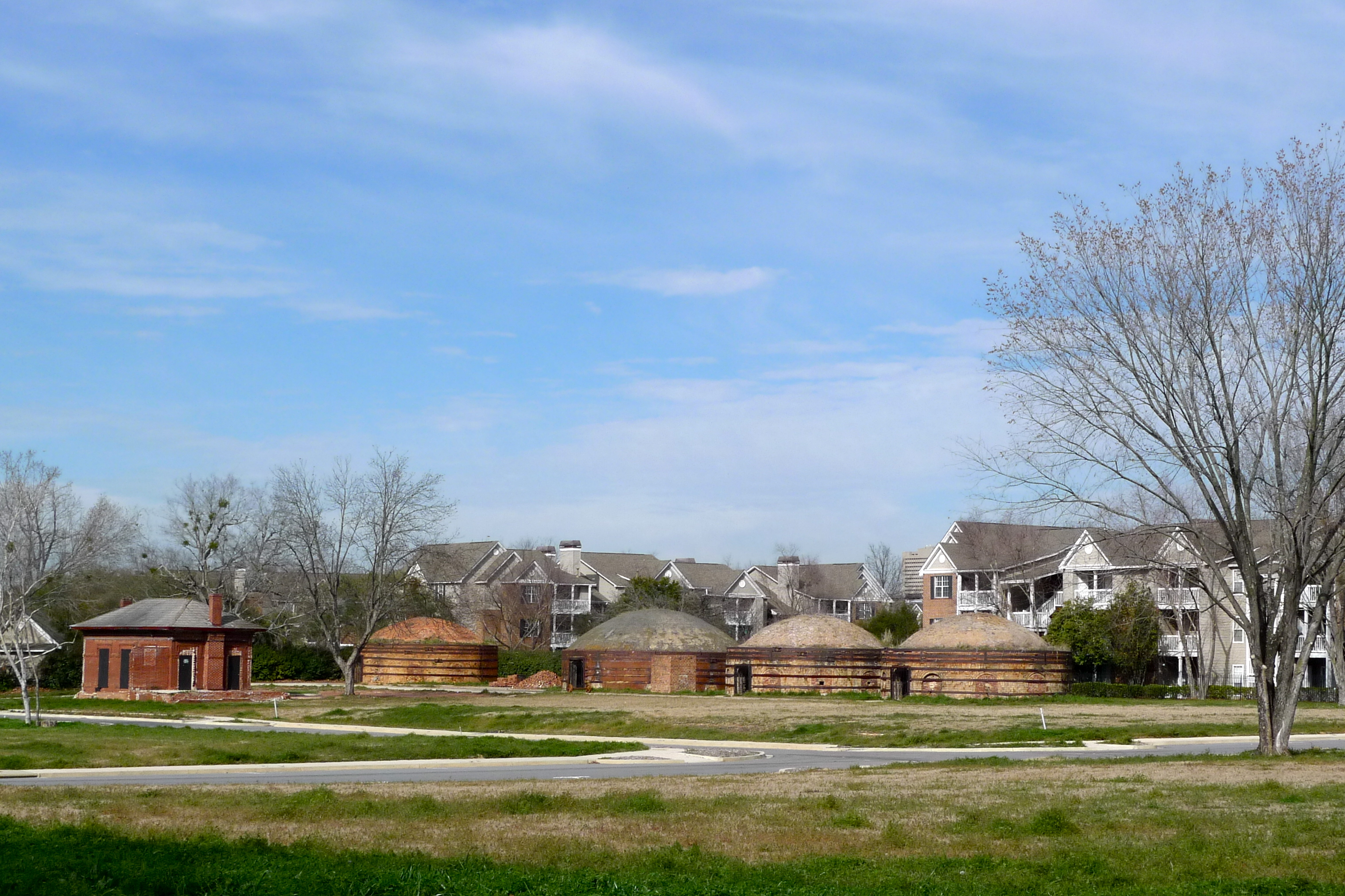
Office and brick beehive kilns

== See also ==
- National Register of Historic Places listings in Lexington County, South Carolina
