= Cayce, South Carolina =

- City
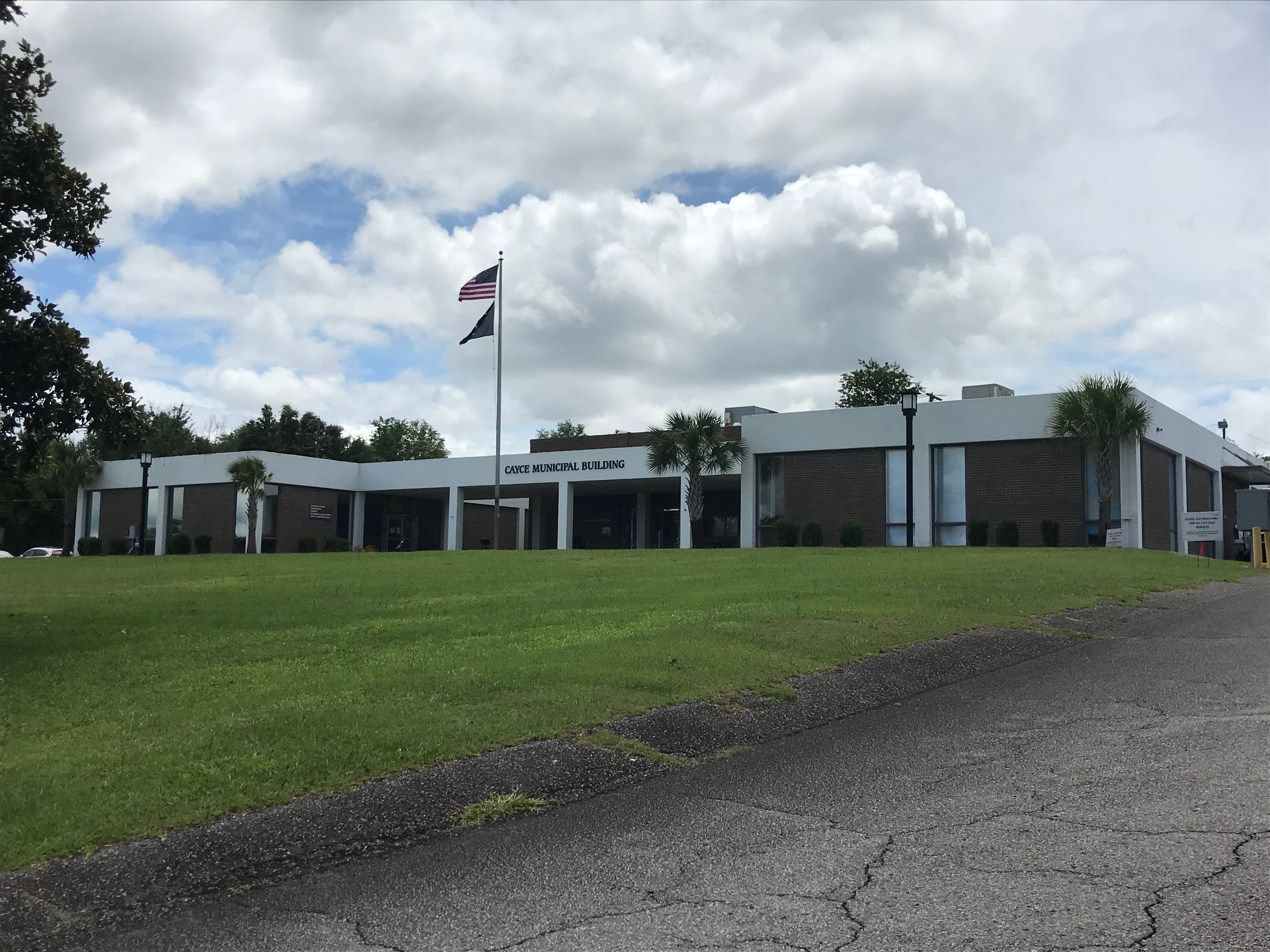
- City Hall

- Seal
- Motto(s): "A new kind of city" "Time for Life"
- Location in South Carolina Location in the United States
- Coordinates: 33°56′20″N 81°04′00″W
- Country: United States
- State: South Carolina
- Counties: Lexington; Richland

Area
  - Total: 17.74 sq mi (45.95 km^{2})
  - Land: 16.88 sq mi (43.72 km^{2})
  - Water: 0.86 sq mi (2.23 km^{2})
- Elevation: 121 ft (37 m)

Population (2020)
  - Total: 13,781
  - Density: 816.4/sq mi (315.21/km^{2})
- Time zone: UTC−5 (Eastern (EST))
  - Summer (DST): UTC−4 (EDT)
- ZIP code: 29033, 29169, 29170, 29171, 29172
- Area codes: 803, 839
- FIPS code: 45-12655
- GNIS feature ID: 2404011
- Website: cityofcayce-sc.gov

Cayce (/ˈkeɪsi/ KAY-see) is a city in the U.S. state of South Carolina, along the Congaree River. Its population was 12,528 at the 2010 census and rose to 13,789 in the 2020 United States Census, and it is the third-most populated municipality in Lexington County. The city is primarily in Lexington County, with additional, predominantly rural land to the east in Richland County. Cayce is part of the Columbia metropolitan statistical area and is within South Carolina's Midlands region.

== History ==
What was to become Cayce was home to Native Americans for at least 12,000 years. This includes what are now known as the Manning Archeological Site, the SAM Site, and the Taylor Site.

Spanish explorer Hernando de Soto reached the area in 1540, encountering a large native village at Congaree Creek, where Cayce now stands. Near the end of the 17th century, explorer John Lawson visited and documented his trip. In 1718, during the colonial period, the English built the first permanent fort, the first structure built in the Midlands. A second fort was built on the river in 1748. These were referred to as Congaree Fort #1 and Congaree Fort #2, and became part of the Congarees Site in 1974.

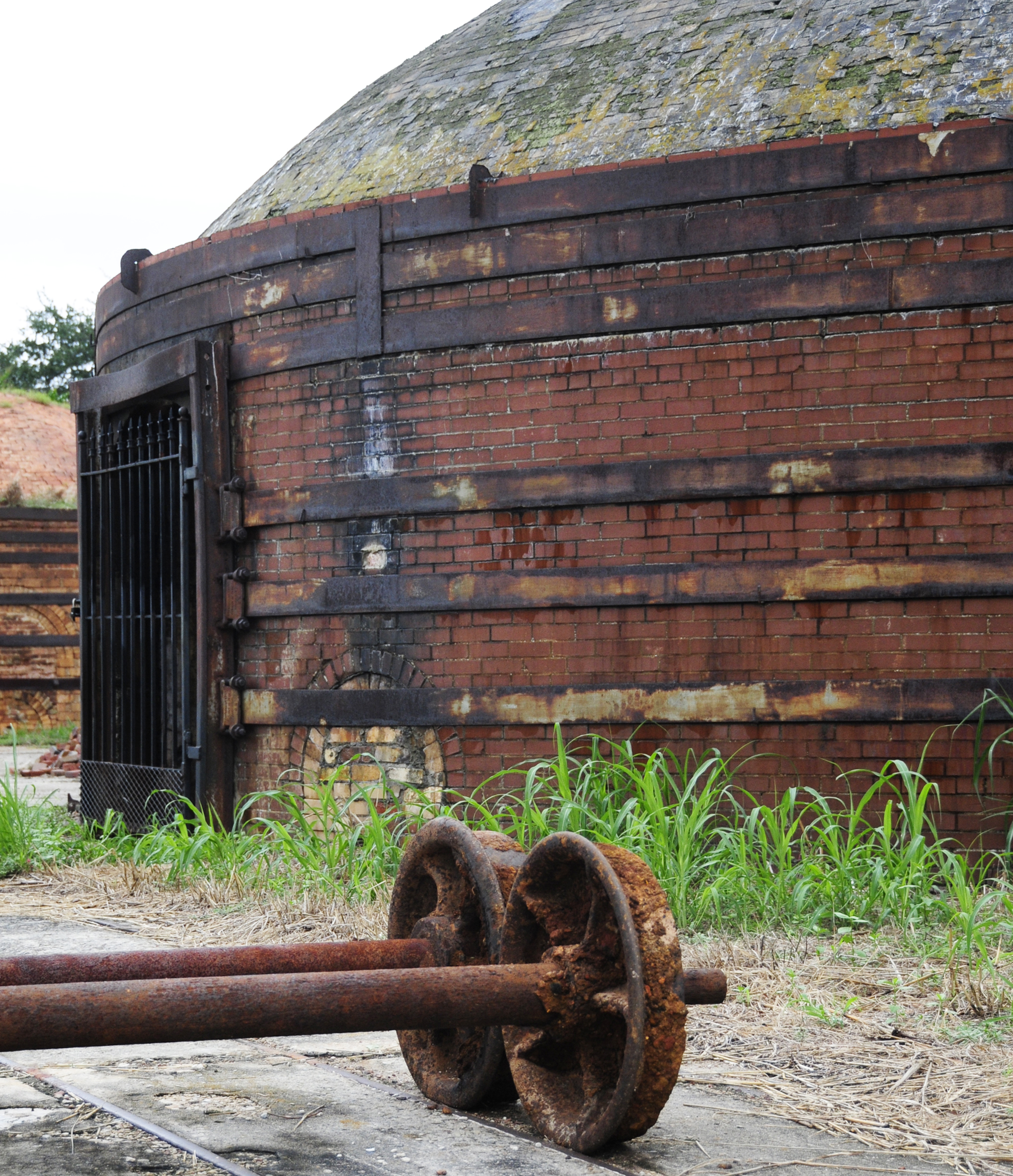
One of the kilns from the Guignard Brick Works, established in 1803

The Guignard Brick Works were established on the west bank of the Congaree in 1803, and remained active for nearly two centuries.

The town includes the area that was once Granby, at one time the county seat and a flourishing community before it was abandoned by the end of the first quarter of the 19th century.

The town was incorporated in 1914 and named for local businessman William J. Cayce.

In December 2007, the city council voted to annex a 3,100-acre (13 km^{2}) floodplain in Richland County. Prior to this annexation, Cayce was entirely situated within Lexington County. The city planned to develop the annexed area, but after significant evaluations, the city abandoned the project after determining that development was not suitable in the flood-prone area, leaving Cayce with a sizeable piece of sparsely populated land.

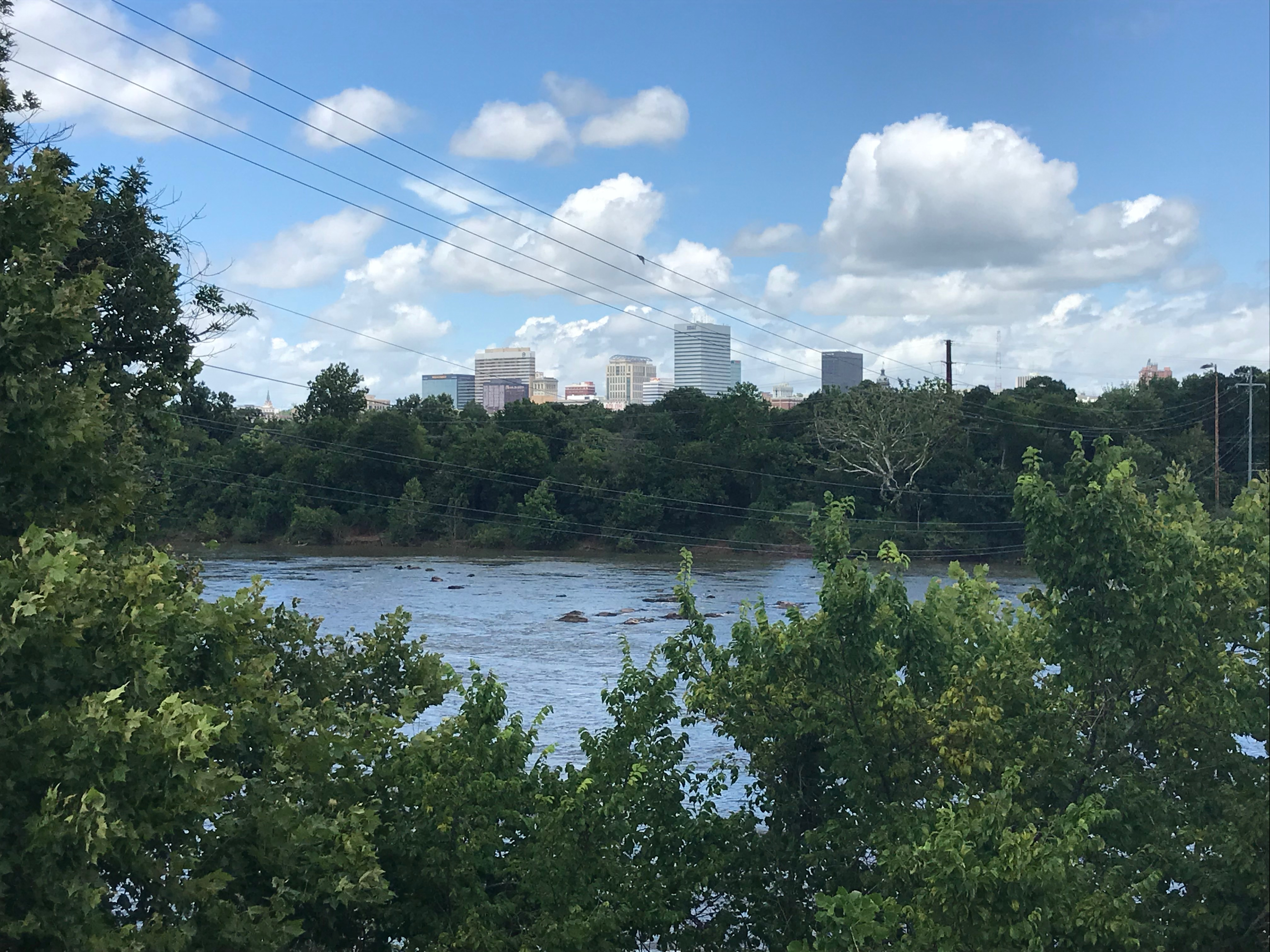
The city of Columbia as seen from Cayce, over the Congaree River

== Geography ==
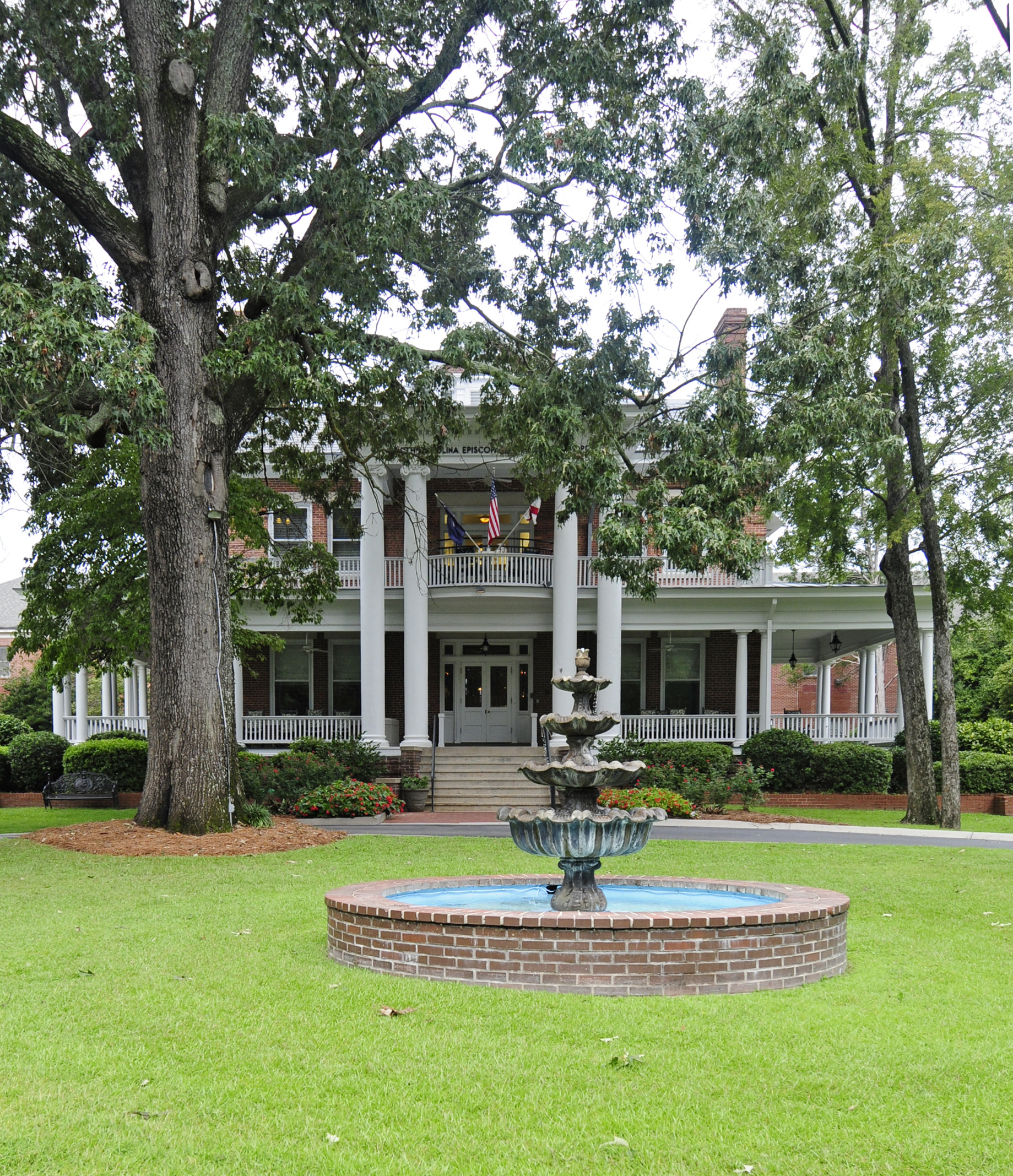
Still Hopes, built in 1910

Cayce is in eastern Lexington County and western Richland County, with the traditional center of town on the west side of the Congaree River. The Congaree divides the city from the state capital, Columbia, to the northeast. Cayce is also bordered by the city of West Columbia to the north, the town of Springdale to the northwest, and the town of Pine Ridge to the southwest.

According to the United States Census Bureau, the city has a total area of 17.6 square miles (45.5 km^{2}), of which 16.8 square miles (43.5 km^{2}) are land and 0.77 square miles (2.0 km^{2}), or 4.38%, are covered by water.

== Attractions ==
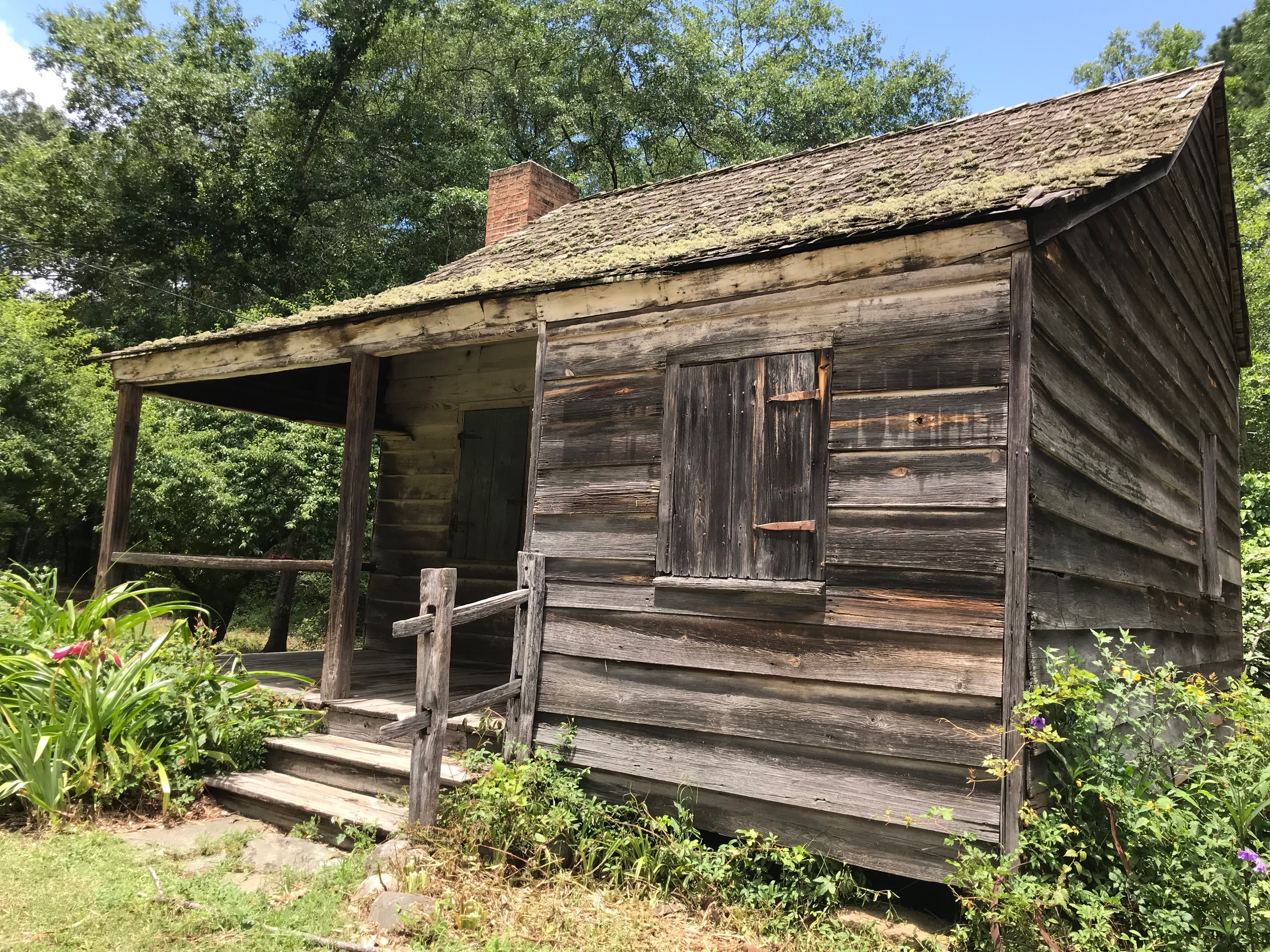
Exhibit of the Cayce Historical Museum

Cayce has several hiking trails throughout the city. All of its public attractions, with the exception of the Cayce Historical Museum, are free of charge.

- The Cayce Riverwalk, sometimes referred to as the Cayce/West Columbia River Walk, is a paved, 12-mile (19 km) (Note: Four miles of this trail are in the City of West Columbia.) hiking and biking trail along the Congaree River. The Riverwalk has four segments with several access points, and provides historical markers along the pathway. The park sometimes floods when the Congaree River exceeds flood stage.
- The 12,000-year-old park is built upon land that the city states has not changed much in the past 12,000 years.
- The Timmerman Trail is a 3.5-mile (5.6 km) hiking and biking trail through the woods. The trail is maintained by Dominion Energy and is located near the company's headquarters. The trail is named after the pro-segregationist former governor of South Carolina, George Bell Timmerman Jr.
- The Congaree Creek Heritage Preserve' has a 2.7-mile (4.3 km) hiking trail through the woods along Congaree Creek.
- Cayce Historical Museum, located at the city's municipal complex, includes Native American, colonial, Revolutionary War, and Civil War artifacts.
- The Guignard Brick Works were established by the Guignard family in 1801. The complex, listed on the National Register of Historic Places, includes four brick beehive kilns, a historic brick office, and remnants of other industrial features of the brick works.

== Economy ==
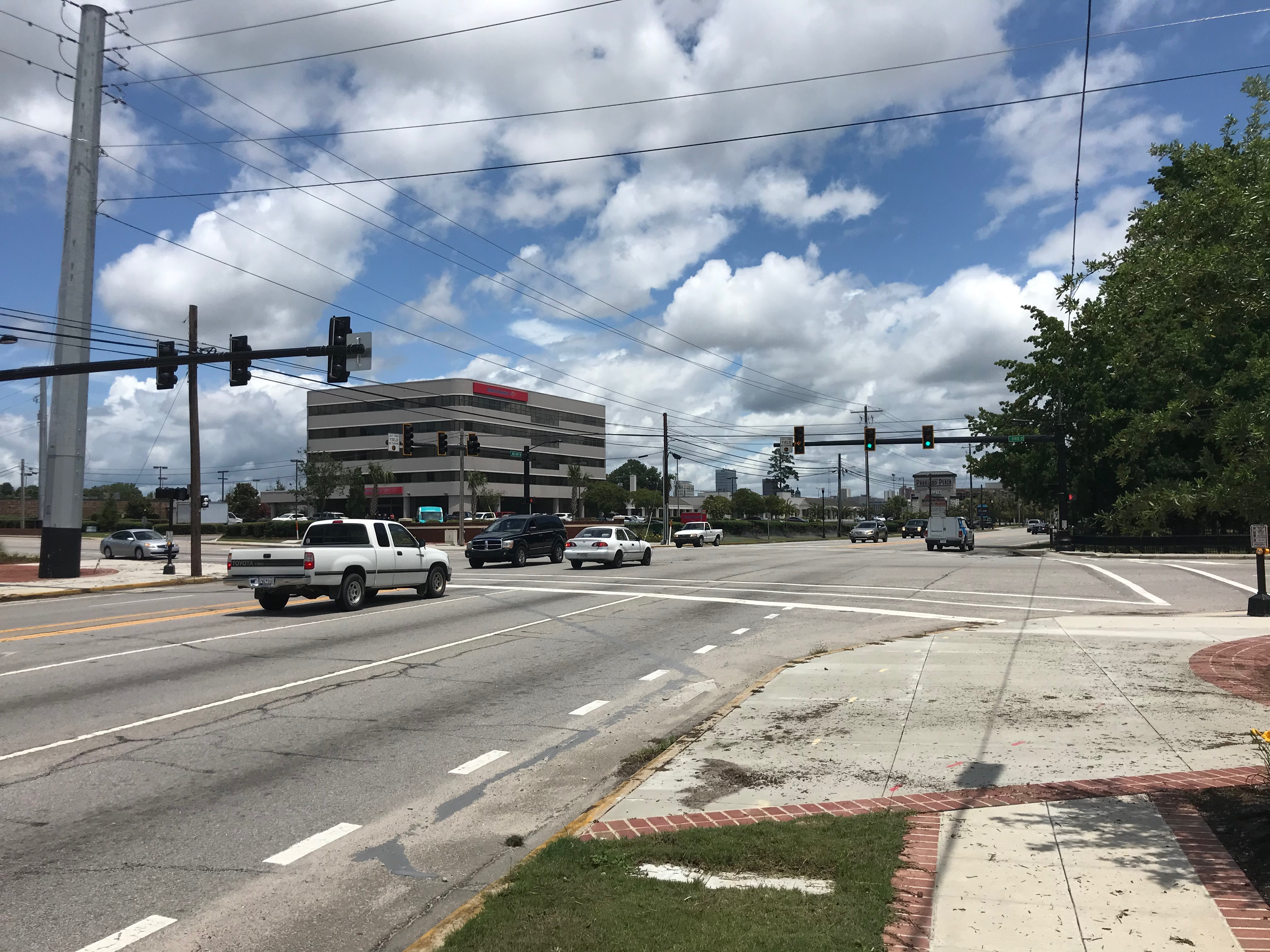
Knox Abbott Drive in Cayce

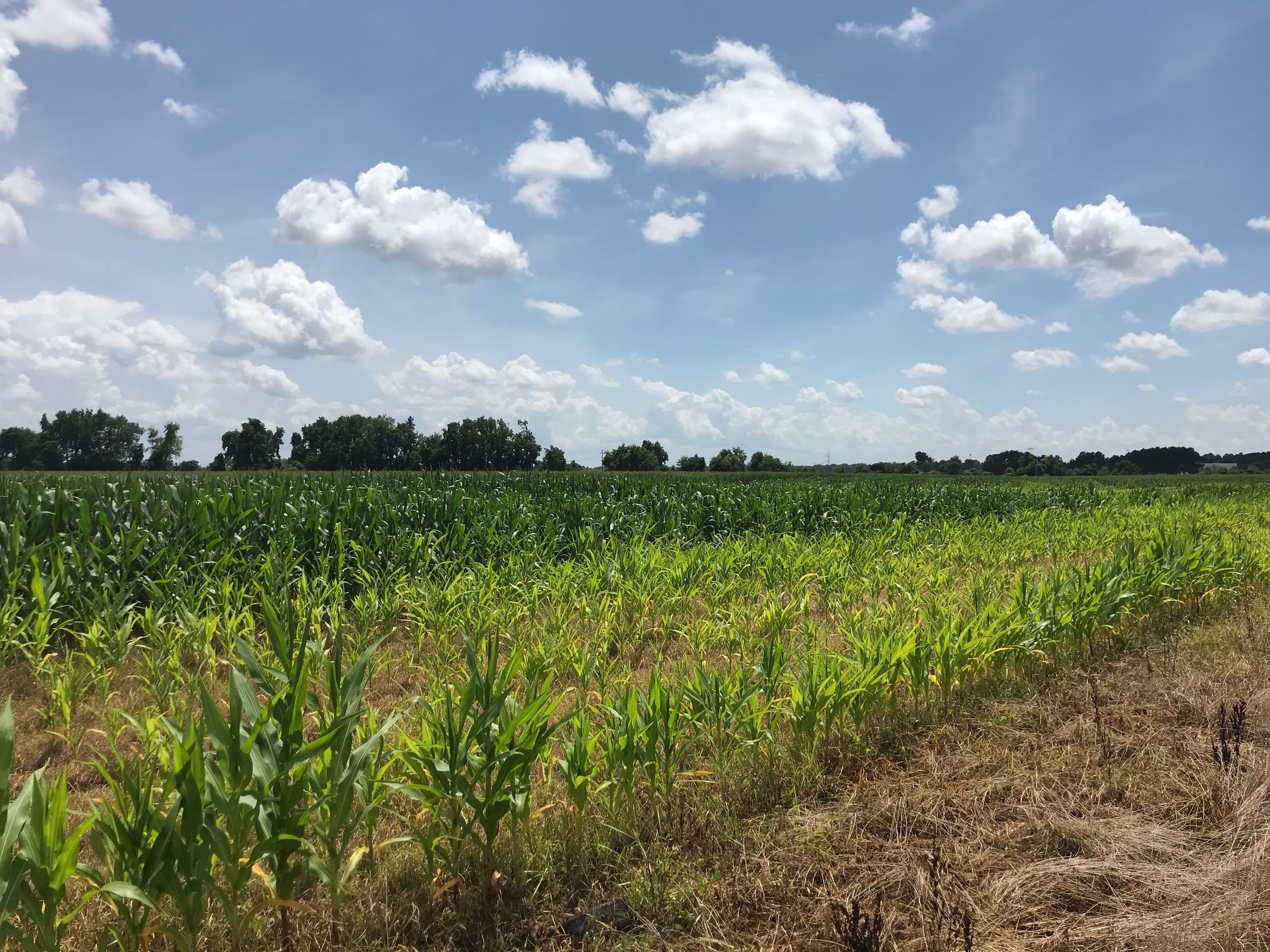
A corn field in the rural Richland County portion of the city

Cayce is the home of Dominion Energy South Carolina, a subsidiary company of Dominion Energy, which purchased SCANA following the nukegate scandal. Prior to this acquisition, SCANA was headquartered in Cayce. Dominion Energy employs over 17,000 people in 15 states, providing energy to nearly 7 million customers.

== Transportation ==
=== Public transportation ===
==== Bus system ====
Public transportation in Cayce is provided by the COMET, or officially the Central Midlands Regional Transit Authority. The bus system has several routes in Cayce and is the main public transit system for the greater Columbia area.

==== Columbia Metropolitan Airport ====
The Columbia Metropolitan Airport (IATA:CAE) serves as the main airport for the greater Columbia area, and is just west of the Cayce city limits. In 2018, the airport served 1,197,603 passengers with 12,324 flights. The airport is the regional hub for UPS Airlines, transporting 136.7 million pounds of freight/mail in 2018. The airport was originally named Lexington County Airport, and during World War II trained pilots for North American B-25 Mitchell crews.

==== Highways, roadways, and railways ====
- I-26 - Interstate 26 passes through the western side of Cayce and connects the Columbia area to the other two major population centers of South Carolina, the Greenville-Spartanburg area to the northwest and the Charleston area to the southeast.
- I-77 - Interstate 77 has its southern terminus in Cayce at I-26 and ends in Cleveland, Ohio. It is frequently used by travelers on the eastern Midwest of the United States heading to or from Florida.
- US-321 - U.S. Route 321 passes through the western and northern sides of Cayce. It leads east across the Congaree River into downtown Columbia, then continues north toward Gastonia, North Carolina, while to the south it leads to the Savannah, Georgia, area.
- SC-2 - South Carolina Highway 2 passes through the center of Cayce on State Street and Frink Street.
- The Columbia Subdivision, a railroad line owned by CSX Transportation, passes through Cayce; it was the site of a deadly train collision in February 2018.

== Education ==
Public schools (Note: Schools that are outside of Cayce's limits and inside another municipality's limits are not included in this list.)
Type	School	Enrollment	Within city limits
Elementary	Cayce Elementary School	1,058	Yes
Middle	Cyril B. Busbee Creative Arts Academy	418	Yes
Middle	R. H. Fulmer Middle School	684	Yes
High	Airport High School	1,348	Yes
High	Brookland-Cayce High School	964	Yes
College	Midlands Technical College, Airport campus	15,000 (Note: System wide)	No

The Cayce-West Columbia branch of the Lexington County Public Library serves the cities of Cayce and West Columbia.

== Demographics ==
Historical population
Census	Pop.	Note	%±
1920	746		—
1930	1,267		69.8%
1940	1,476		16.5%
1950	3,294		123.2%
1960	8,517		158.6%
1970	9,967		17.0%
1980	11,701		17.4%
1990	11,163		−4.6%
2000	12,150		8.8%
2010	12,528		3.1%
2020	13,781		10.0%
2025 (est.)	13,680	▼	−0.7%
U.S. Decennial Census

=== Racial and ethnic composition ===
Cayce city, South Carolina – Racial and ethnic composition Note: the US Census treats Hispanic/Latino as an ethnic category. This table excludes Latinos from the racial categories and assigns them to a separate category. Hispanics/Latinos may be of any race.
Race / Ethnicity (NH = Non-Hispanic)	Pop 2000	Pop 2010	Pop 2020	% 2000	% 2010	% 2020
White alone (NH)	8,990	8,355	8,664	73.99%	66.69%	62.87%
Black or African American alone (NH)	2,728	3,103	3,062	22.45%	24.77%	22.22%
Native American or Alaska Native alone (NH)	31	47	34	0.26%	0.38%	0.25%
Asian alone (NH)	131	234	502	1.08%	1.87%	3.64%
Native Hawaiian or Pacific Islander alone (NH)	16	9	1	0.13%	0.07%	0.01%
Other race alone (NH)	12	10	63	0.10%	0.08%	0.46%
Mixed race or Multiracial (NH)	87	231	564	0.72%	1.84%	4.09%
Hispanic or Latino (any race)	155	539	891	1.28%	4.30%	6.47%
Total	12,150	12,528	13,781	100.00%	100.00%	100.00%

=== 2020 census ===
As of the 2020 census, Cayce had a population of 13,781. The median age was 34.6 years. 18.3% of residents were under the age of 18 and 15.5% of residents were 65 years of age or older. For every 100 females there were 93.5 males, and for every 100 females age 18 and over there were 90.2 males age 18 and over.

99.9% of residents lived in urban areas, while 0.1% lived in rural areas.

There were 6,232 households in Cayce, of which 22.5% had children under the age of 18 living in them. Of all households, 31.1% were married-couple households, 25.5% were households with a male householder and no spouse or partner present, and 35.8% were households with a female householder and no spouse or partner present. About 35.5% of all households were made up of individuals and 11.2% had someone living alone who was 65 years of age or older.

There were 6,959 housing units, of which 10.4% were vacant. The homeowner vacancy rate was 1.6% and the rental vacancy rate was 9.3%.

Racial composition as of the 2020 census
Race	Number	Percent
White	8,799	63.8%
Black or African American	3,089	22.4%
American Indian and Alaska Native	67	0.5%
Asian	502	3.6%
Native Hawaiian and Other Pacific Islander	1	0.0%
Some other race	496	3.6%
Two or more races	827	6.0%

=== 2000 census ===
As of the 2000 census, 12,150 people lived in the city, in 5,133 households and 3,079 families. The population density was 1,114.6 inhabitants per square mile (430.3/km^{2}). The 5,517 housing units had an average density of 506.1 per square mile (195.4/km^{2}). The racial makeup of the city was 74.55% White, 22.50% African American, 1.08% Asian, 0.26% Native American, 0.15% Pacific Islander, 0.67% from other races, and 0.80% from two or more races. About 1.28% of the population were Hispanics or Latinos of any race.

Of the 5,133 households, 24.4% had children under 18 living with them, 41.8% were married couples living together, 14.5% had a female householder with no husband present, and 40.0% were not families. About 29.0% of all households were made up of individuals, and 10.8% had someone living alone who was 65 or older. The average household size was 2.36 and the average family size was 2.89.

In the city, the age distribution was 20.7% under 18, 14.1% from 18 to 24, 28.6% from 25 to 44, 21.9% from 45 to 64, and 14.7% who were 65 or older. The median age was 36 years. For every 100 females, there were 86.2 males. For every 100 females 18 and over, there were 81.8 males.

The median income for a household in the city was $35,850, and for a family was $43,560. Males had a median income of $30,317 versus $24,408 for females. The per capita income for the city was $17,745. 17.0% of the population and 9.9% of families were below the poverty line. Out of the total population, 20.0% of those under the age of 18 and 8.2% of those 65 and older were living below the poverty line.
