= The Congarees =

Archaeological site in South Carolina, United States

- The Congarees Historical Site
- U.S. National Register of Historic Places
- Nearest city: Cayce, South Carolina
- Area: 160 acres (65 ha)
- Built: 1691, 1718
- NRHP reference No.: 74002261
- Added to NRHP: December 31, 1974

The Congarees is a historic archaeological site located near Cayce, Lexington County, South Carolina along Congaree Creek. The site was established as early as 1691, and served as a frontier outpost, early township settlement, and crossroads of the great trade paths of the Catawba and Cherokee nations. The Fort Congaree back country fort was established on the site in 1718.

It was listed on the National Register of Historic Places in 1974.

== See also ==
- Catawba Trail
- Old Buncombe Road
