= Granby Mill Village Historic District =

Historic district in South Carolina, United States

- U.S. National Register of Historic Places
- U.S. Historic district
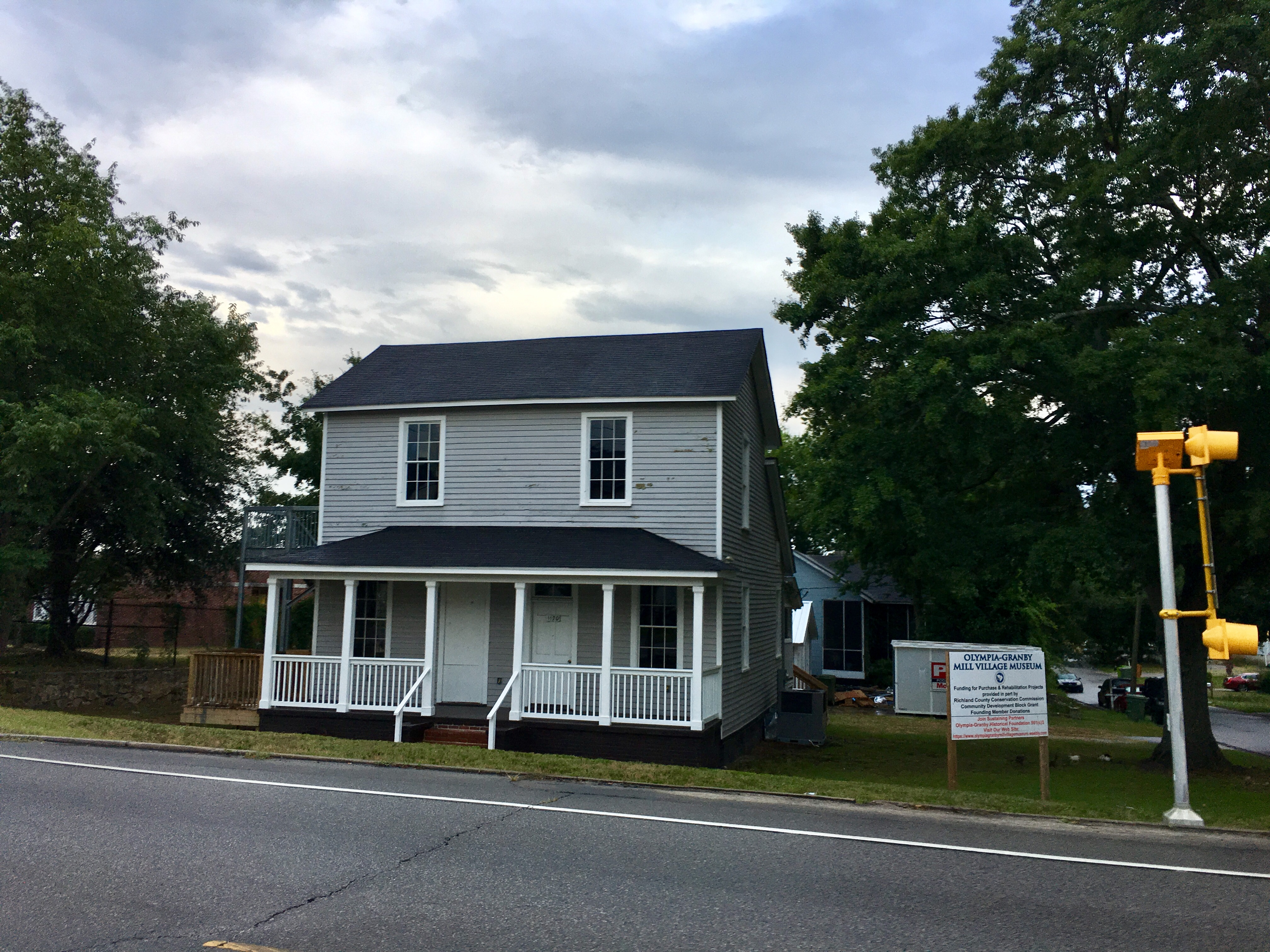
- Granby-Olympia Mills Village Museum

- Location within South Carolina Location within the United States
- Location: Roughly bounded by Catawba, Gist, Heyward, and Church Sts., Columbia, South Carolina
- Coordinates: 33°58′59″N 81°02′22″W
- Area: 60 acres (24 ha)
- Built: 1942
- Architect: Whaley, W.B. Smith, & Co.
- Architectural style: Late 19th And Early 20th Century American Movements, Romanesque
- MPS: Textile Mills designed by W.B. Smith Whaley MPS
- NRHP reference No.: 93000905
- Added to NRHP: September 20, 1993

Granby Mill Village Historic District is a national historic district located at Columbia, South Carolina. The district encompasses 97 contributing buildings associated with a cotton mill and associated mill village. The mill was initially constructed in 1896–1897, and is a large four-story, rectangular brick building in the Romanesque Revival style. It features two projecting five-story entrance towers. The Granby Mill Village includes a number of "saltbox" style dwellings reminiscent of a New England mill village. The district also includes the mill gatehouse, the two-story mill office building (c. 1902), commercial buildings, the Gothic Revival style Whaley Street Methodist Church, and operatives' houses.

It was added to the National Register of Historic Places in 1993.
