= Elmwood Cemetery =

Elmwood Cemetery may refer to several places in the United States and Canada:

Alphabetical by state or province, then town

- Elmwood Cemetery (Birmingham, Alabama), US (now Elmwood Cemetery and Mausoleum)
- Elmwood Cemetery (Fort Smith, Arkansas), US, listed on the National Register of Historic Places (NRHP)
- Elmwood Cemetery (Gooding, Idaho), US
- Elmwood Cemetery (River Grove, Illinois), US (now Elmwood Cemetery and Mausoleum)
- Elmwood Cemetery Gates, Sycamore, Illinois, US; NRHP-listed
- Elmwood Cemetery (Holyoke, Massachusetts), Elmwood, Holyoke, Massachusetts, US
- Elmwood Cemetery (Detroit), Michigan, US; NRHP-listed in the Eastside Historic Cemetery District
- Elmwood Cemetery (Kansas City, Missouri), US, NRHP-listed
- Elmwood Cemetery (North Brunswick), New Jersey, US
- Elmwood Cemetery (Adams, New York), Adams, New York, US
- Elmwood Cemetery (Charlotte, North Carolina), Charlotte, North Carolina, US
- Elmwood Cemetery (Lorain, Ohio) in Lorain, Ohio, US
- Elmwood Cemetery (Columbia, South Carolina), US, NRHP-listed
- Elmwood Cemetery (Sherbrooke), Quebec, Canada
- Elmwood Cemetery (Memphis, Tennessee), US, including the office and entrance bridge; NRHP-listed
- Elmwood Cemetery (Norfolk, Virginia), US, NRHP-listed
- Elmwood Cemetery (West Virginia), US

== See also ==
- Elmwood (disambiguation)
- Elmwood Park (disambiguation)
