= Elmwood =

Elmwood may refer to:

- James Russell Lowell (1819–1891), who used it as a nom-de-plume

== Places ==
=== Canada ===
- Elmwood, Edmonton, Edmonton, Alberta
- Elmwood (electoral district), provincial electoral district in Manitoba
- Elmwood, Winnipeg, Manitoba
- Elmwood—Transcona, federal electoral district in Manitoba
- Elmwood, a community in West Grey, Ontario

=== United States ===
(sorted by state, then city/town)

- Elmwood, Berkeley, California
- Elmwood, Connecticut, in the town of West Hartford
- Elmwood, Illinois
- Elmwood Township, Peoria County, Illinois
- Elmwood (Georgetown, Kentucky), listed on the National Register of Historic Places (NRHP) in Scott County
- Elmwood (Richmond, Kentucky), listed on the NRHP in Madison County
- Elmwood (Springfield, Kentucky), listed on the NRHP in Washington County
- Elmwood, Louisiana
- Elmwood (Williamsport, Maryland), listed on the NRHP in Washington County
- Elmwood (Cambridge, Massachusetts), listed on the NRHP in Middlesex County
- Elmwood, Holyoke, Massachusetts, a neighborhood of Holyoke, Massachusetts
- Elmwood Township, Leelanau County, Michigan in Leelanau County
- Elmwood (Sault Ste. Marie, Michigan), listed on the NRHP in Chippewa County
- Elmwood Township, Tuscola County, Michigan in Tuscola County
- Elmwood Township, Clay County, Minnesota
- Elmwood, Missouri
- Elmwood, Nebraska
- Elmwood (Lewis, North Carolina), listed on the NRHP in Granville County
- Elmwood (Merry Hill, North Carolina), listed on the NRHP in Bertie County
- Elmwood (Raleigh, North Carolina), listed on the NRHP in Wake County
- Elmwood (Windsor, North Carolina), listed on the NRHP in Bertie County
- Elmwood (Grafton, North Dakota), listed on the NRHP in Walsh County
- Elmwood (Oyster Bay, New York), an historic house listed on the NRHP in Nassau County
- Elmwood, Ohio, an unincorporated community
- Elmwood, Oklahoma
- Elmwood, Providence, Rhode Island, a neighborhood of Providence, Rhode Island
- Elmwood, Tennessee
- Elmwood, Texas, an unincorporated community in Anderson County, Texas
- Elmwood, West Virginia
- Elmwood, Wisconsin
- Elmwood (Murfreesboro, Tennessee), listed on the NRHP in Rutherford County
- Elmwood (Dallas), Texas, a neighborhood
- Elmwood (Culpeper, Virginia), listed on the NRHP in Culpeper County
- Elmwood (Loretto, Virginia), listed on the NRHP in Essex County
- Elmwood (Shepherdstown, West Virginia), a Federal style house listed on the NRHP in Jefferson County
- Elmwood-on-the-Opequon, West Virginia
- Elmwood (Union, West Virginia), an historic house listed on the NRHP in Monroe County

== See also ==
- Elmwood Cemetery (disambiguation)
- Elmwood Park (disambiguation)
- Elmwood Place, Ohio
- Elmwood School (Ottawa), Ontario
- Elmwood Township (disambiguation)
