= Elmwood Park Historic District =

Elmwood Park Historic District may refer to:

- Elmwood Park (Syracuse, New York), a historic district listed on the National Register of Historic Places (NRHP) in New York
- Elmwood Park Historic District (Bethlehem, Pennsylvania), listed on the NRHP in Pennsylvania
- Elmwood Park Historic District (Columbia, South Carolina), listed on the NRHP in South Carolina
