= Elmwood, Ontario =

Elmwood, Ontario may refer to several places in Ontario, Canada:

- Elmwood, Frontenac County, Ontario
- Elmwood, Grey County, Ontario

== See also ==
- Elmwood (disambiguation)
