= Elmwood Park =

Elmwood Park may refer to:

- Elmwood Park, Edmonton, Canada
- Elmwood Park, Illinois
  - Elmwood Park High School (Illinois)
  - Elmwood Park station
- Elmwood Park, New Jersey
  - Elmwood Park Public Schools
- Elmwood Park (Omaha), a neighborhood in Omaha, Nebraska
- Elmwood Park (Syracuse, New York)
- Elmwood Park, Philadelphia, Pennsylvania
- Elmwood Park, Columbia, South Carolina
- Elmwood Park, Wisconsin
- Elmwood Park, a subdivision of Elmwood, Berkeley, California
- Elmwood Park Zoo, in Norristown, Pennsylvania

== See also ==
Elmwood Park Historic District (disambiguation)
