= Elmwood Township =

Elmwood Township may refer to the following places in the United States:

- Elmwood Township, Peoria County, Illinois
- Elmwood Township, Leelanau County, Michigan
- Elmwood Township, Tuscola County, Michigan
- Elmwood Township, Minnesota
- Elmwood Township, Saline County, Missouri
