= Lexington County Courthouse =

- U.S. National Register of Historic Places
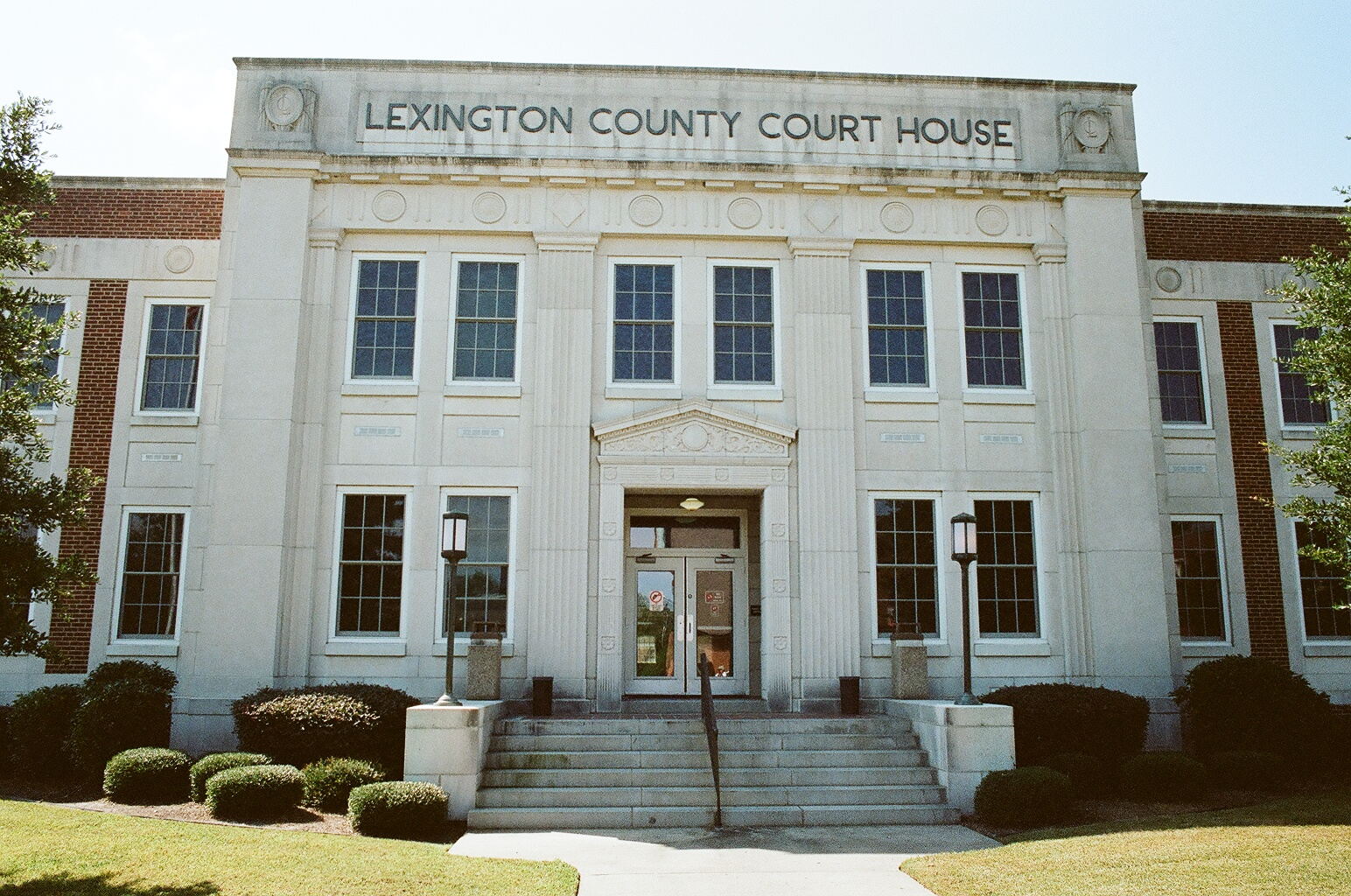

- Location within South Carolina Location within the United States
- Location: 139 E. Main St., Lexington, South Carolina
- Coordinates: 33°58′53″N 81°14′11″W
- Area: 1.78 acres (0.72 ha)
- Built: 1939
- Architect: J. Carroll Johnson and Jesse W. Wessinger
- Architectural style: Classical Revival; Art Deco
- NRHP reference No.: 14000164
- Added to NRHP: April 21, 2014

The Lexington County Courthouse is a historic courthouse located at 139 East Main Street in Lexington, Lexington County, South Carolina. This two story masonry building was constructed in 1939 using funds provided by the Public Works Administration, a Depression-era jobs program part of Franklin Roosevelt's New Deal. The building was designed by J. Carroll Johnson and local architect Jesse W. Wessinger. It exhibits a combination of restrained Classical styling with some Art Deco details that is rare among South Carolina courthouses. It was constructed in the place of the 1884 courthouse, which had been torn down.

The courthouse was added to the National Register of Historic Places in 2014.

== See also ==
- National Register of Historic Places listings in Lexington County, South Carolina
