= Elmwood Park, Columbia, South Carolina =

- Elmwood Park Historic District
- U.S. National Register of Historic Places
- U.S. Historic district
- Elmwood Park neighborhood

- Location within South Carolina Location within the United States
- Location: Columbia, South Carolina
- Coordinates: 34°0′48″N 81°2′42″W
- Architect: Johnson, J.Carroll; Urquhart, James Burwell
- Architectural style: Late 19th And Early 20th Century American Movements, Late 19th And 20th Century Revivals
- NRHP reference No.: 91000529
- Added to NRHP: May 3, 1991

Elmwood Park is a residential neighborhood and historic district in what is now the center of Columbia, South Carolina. Founded in the early 1900s, it was added to the National Register of Historic Places as Elmwood Park Historic District in 1991.

== History ==
The land in the neighborhood was originally the State Fair Grounds, beyond the city limits. The area that is now between Park Street and Wayne Street was used for fairgrounds and a race track. After the state fair moved to its current location adjacent to the University of South Carolina's Williams–Brice Stadium, the various original owners of the area began selling the parcels for real estate development, as well as at least one owner leaving a bequeath in his will for local school development. Eventually, the lots were subdivided and offered to the public at a public auction sale in 1905. This auction date is generally recognized as the establishment of Elmwood Park. As the neighborhood quickly developed, it was annexed by the City of Columbia in 1907. This created the first suburb and the first expansion of the city outside its original planned boundaries.

== National Register of Historic Places ==
The National Register lists 279 homes in the neighborhood, with 219 homes contributing. The housing styles range from Queen Anne style, American Foursquare, gable-front houses, and Colonial Revival houses, to the smaller one-story structures that are predominantly American Craftsman influenced. Brick bungalows are also present, largely later-built from the 1920s and 1930s. A number of shotgun houses still stand in the earliest developed part of the neighborhood.

Two historic schools are located in the neighborhood, the still-functioning Logan Elementary, and the former Wardlaw Junior High, which is now a residential senior facility known as Wardlaw Apartments. Logan School is the work of a local architect, J. Carroll Johnson. James Burwell Urquhart, another prominent Columbia architect, designed Wardlaw Junior High School. Logan was built in 1913 and added to the National Register in 1979. Wardlaw was built in 1927 and added to the National Register in 1984.
