= Elmwood Park Historic District (Bethlehem, Pennsylvania) =

Historic district in Pennsylvania, United States

- U.S. National Register of Historic Places
- U.S. Historic district
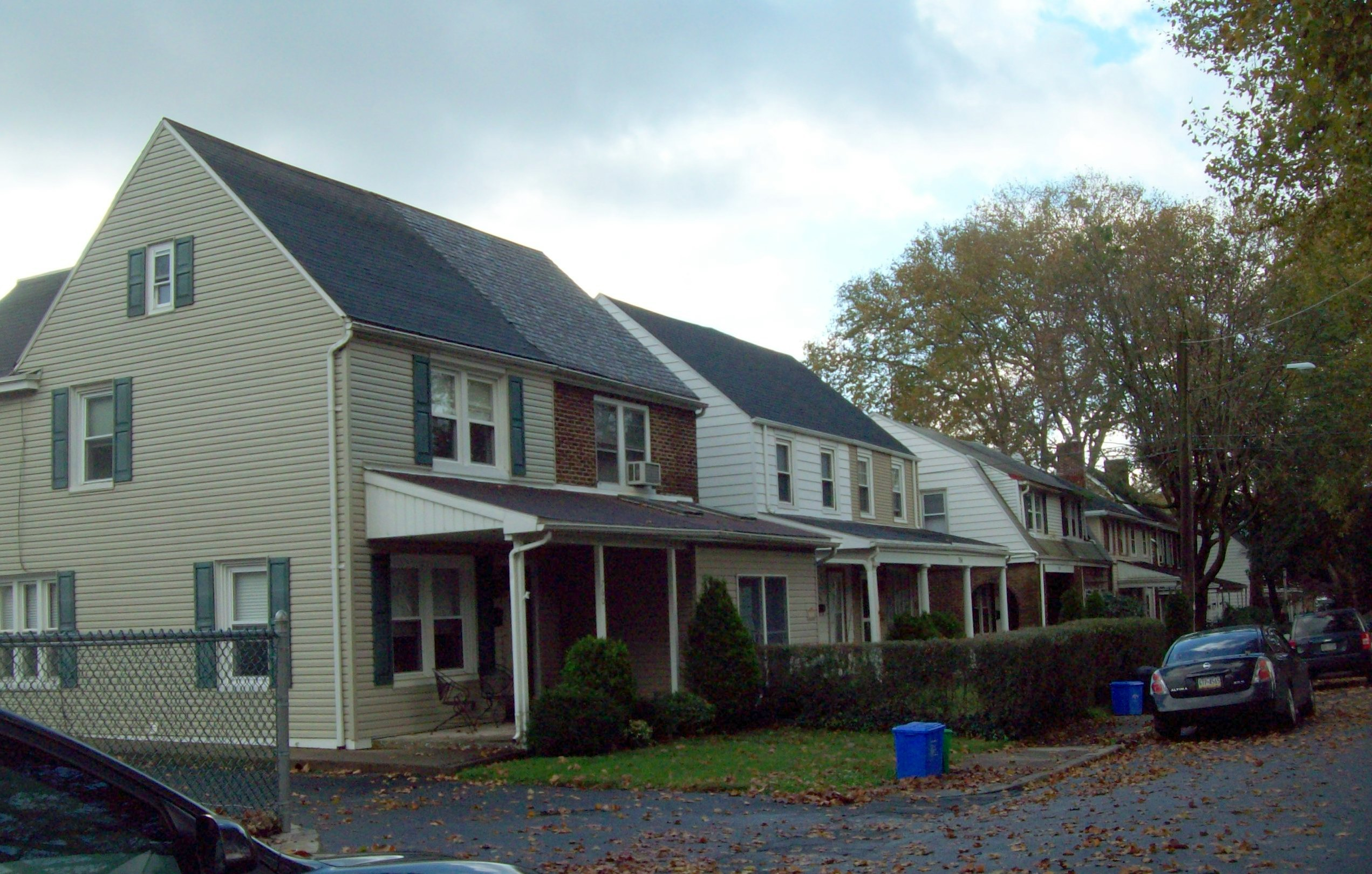
- Elmwood Park Historic District, October 2011

- Location within Pennsylvania Location within the United States
- Location: Roughly bounded by Goepp Circle, Woodruff St., Park Pl., and Carson St., Bethlehem, Pennsylvania
- Coordinates: 40°37′28″N 75°21′56″W
- Area: 14.9 acres (6.0 ha)
- Architectural style: Colonial Revival
- NRHP reference No.: 88000449
- Added to NRHP: April 21, 1988

Elmwood Park Historic District is a historic housing development in Bethlehem, Pennsylvania roughly bounded by Goepp Circle, Woodruff St., Park Pl., and Carson St. The 68 houses in the district were built of brick, clapboard, and stucco from 1917 to 1920.

It is significant for its architecture, and was added to the National Register of Historic Places in 1988.
