= Wardlaw Junior High School =

- U.S. National Register of Historic Places
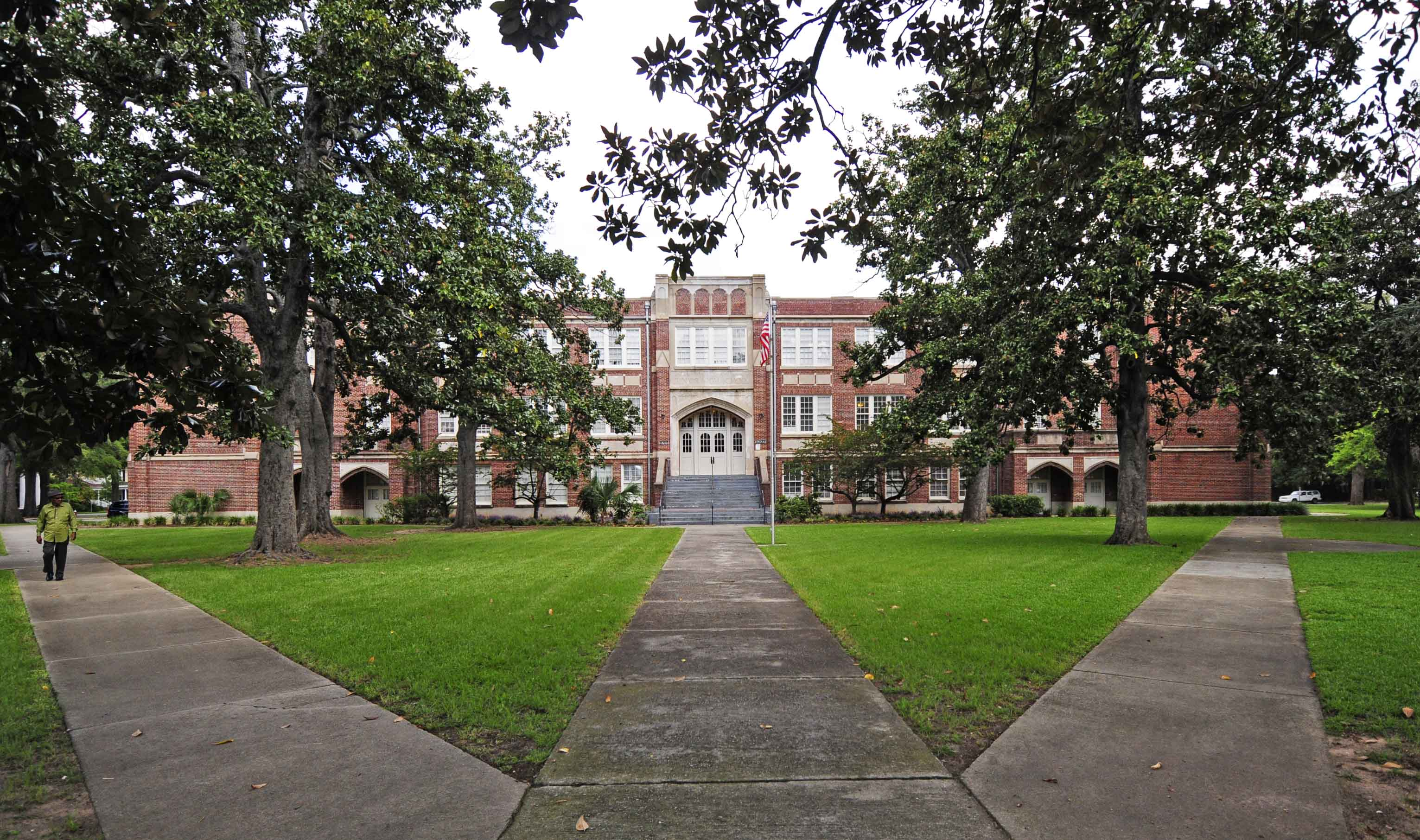
- Wardlaw Junior High School, September 2012

- Location within South Carolina Location within the United States
- Location: 1003 Elmwood Ave., Columbia, South Carolina
- Coordinates: 34°0′45″N 81°2′33″W
- Area: 4.2 acres (1.7 ha)
- Built: 1926-1927
- Architect: Urquhart, J. B.
- Architectural style: Late Gothic Revival
- MPS: Columbia MRA
- NRHP reference No.: 84002096
- Added to NRHP: September 13, 1984

Wardlaw Junior High School, also known as Wardlaw Middle School, is a historic Middle school located at Columbia, South Carolina. It was built in 1926–1927, and is a three-story, rectangular brick structure with a central courtyard. It features Gothic window tracery, arched entrances with one-story porches, and decorative cast stone panels. It was the first junior high school building in South Carolina.

It was added to the National Register of Historic Places in 1984.
