= Elmwood Cemetery (Fort Smith, Arkansas) =

Historic cemetery in Arkansas, United States

- U.S. National Register of Historic Places
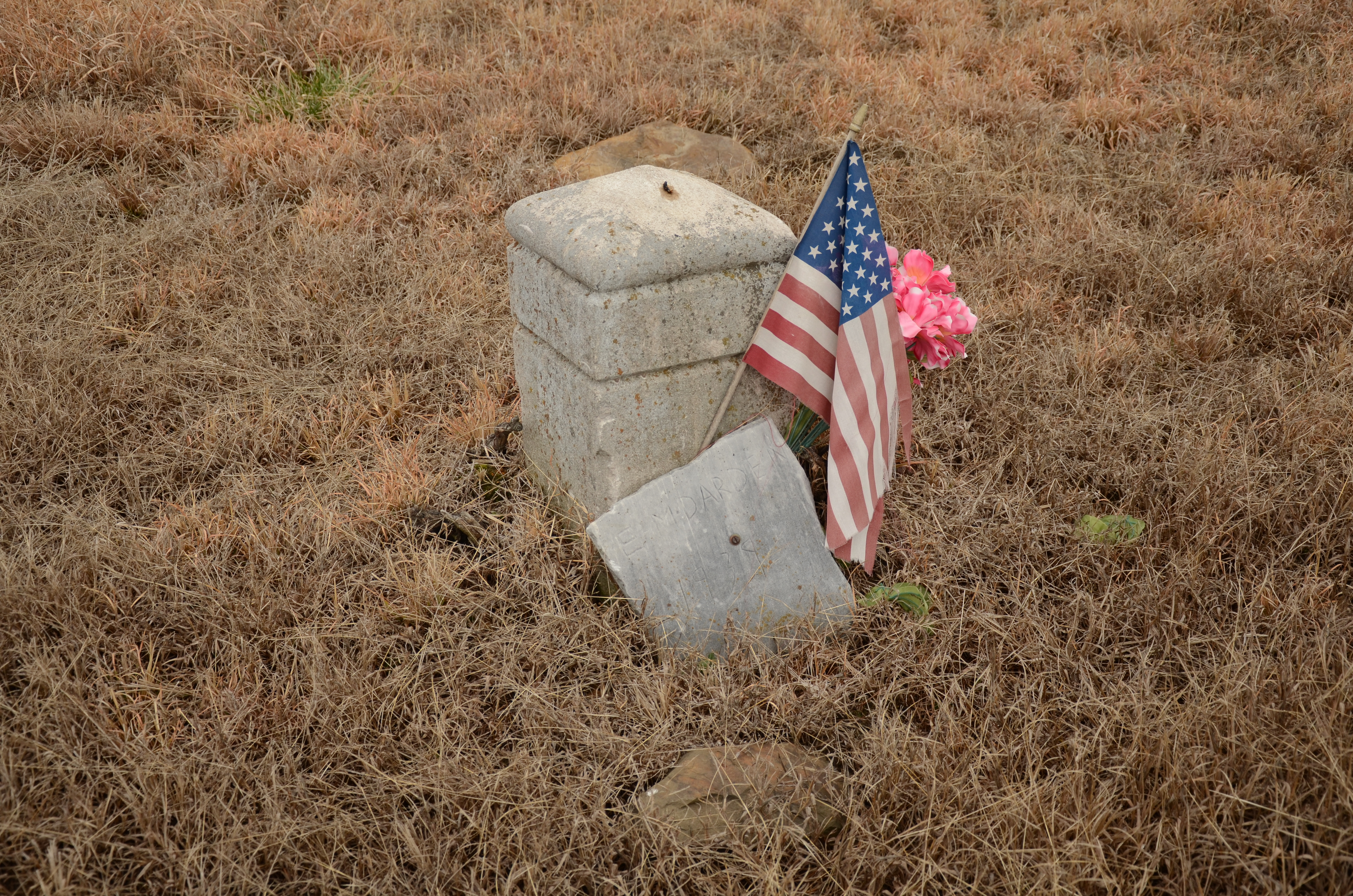

- Location within Arkansas Location within the United States
- Location: SW of intersection of Zero & S 24th Sts., Fort Smith, Arkansas
- Coordinates: 35°19′39″N 94°24′44″W
- Area: 5 acres (2.0 ha)
- Built: 1891
- NRHP reference No.: 100002004
- Added to NRHP: January 26, 2018

Elmwood Cemetery, also known historically as the Poor Farm Cemetery, is a historic cemetery at Zero and South 24th Streets in Fort Smith, Arkansas. Established in 1891, it is on the grounds of Sebastian County's first poor farm, purchased by the county in 1890. It remained in use at least into the 1940s, and is the only surviving visible element of the poor farm. The cemetery contains several hundred graves, although only seven have markers. The cemetery is about 5 acres (2.0 ha) in size, and is an unbounded open field in a suburban residential area.

The cemetery was listed on the National Register of Historic Places in 2018.

== See also ==
- National Register of Historic Places listings in Sebastian County, Arkansas
