= J. Carroll Johnson =

American architect

J. Carroll Johnson (November 9, 1882 – May 4, 1967) was an architect in South Carolina. He was the first resident architect at University of South Carolina and supervised campus expansion. He designed numerous residences in Columbia's suburbs during the roaring 1920s. His work also includes the Lexington County Courthouse which is listed on the National Register of Historic Places.

He was born in Kristianstad, Sweden. He is buried at Elmwood Cemetery.

The Library of Congress has photographs of some of his buildings including from the Historic American Buildings Survey (catalogued along with musical documents from minstrel performer Carroll Johnson).

== Work ==
- State Industrial School for Girls (1918)
- First Presbyterian Church of Kershaw, South Carolina (1920),
- Three schools in Lancaster, South Carolina (1922)
- Buildings on the University of South Carolina campus including:
  - Sloan College (1927)
  - South Caroliniana Library wing additions (1927–1928)
  - Melton Observatory (1928)
  - Wardlaw College (1930–1931)
  - Sims Dormitory (1939)
  - Petigru College (1949) with Simons & Lapham of Charleston
  - LeConte College (1952)
  - Osborne Administration Building (1951 – 1952)
  - President’s House (1952), conversion and renovation
- Lexington County Courthouse (1939 – 1940) with Jesse W. Wessinger in Lexington, South Carolina
- First Baptist Church of West Columbia (1942)

=== Residential buildings ===
- Benjamin F. Taylor House (1910 – 1912)
- Boyne-Pressley-Spigner House (1915)
- Two houses for Dr. Robert E. Seibels in Columbia (1927 and 1933)
- John T. Stevens House in Kershaw (1918)
- James L. Coker, Jr. house (1923 – 1924)
- J. B. Gilbert house (1929)
- 102 South Driftwood Drive in Columbia
