= Elmwood, Holyoke, Massachusetts =

Elmwood
- Neighborhood of Holyoke
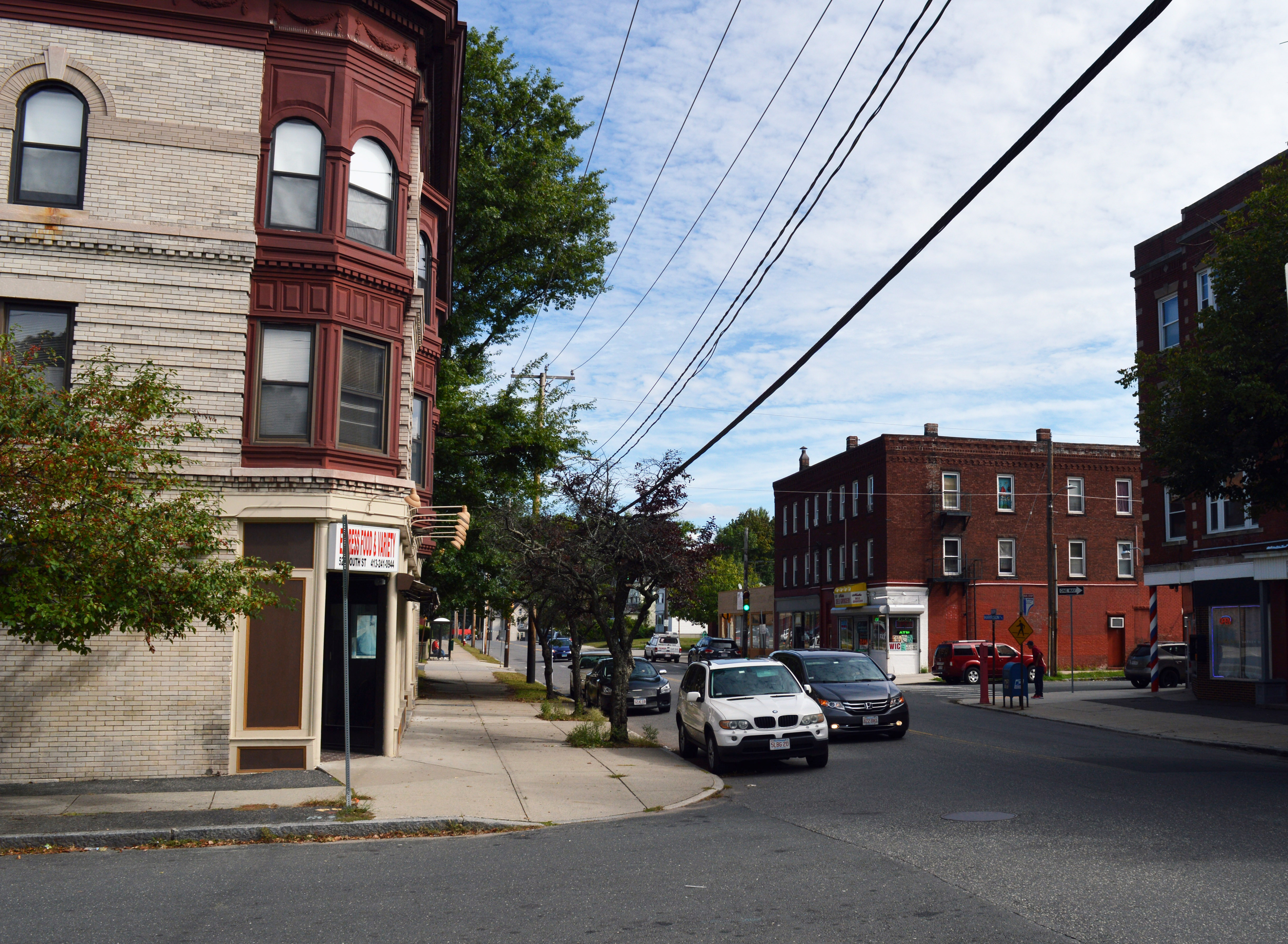
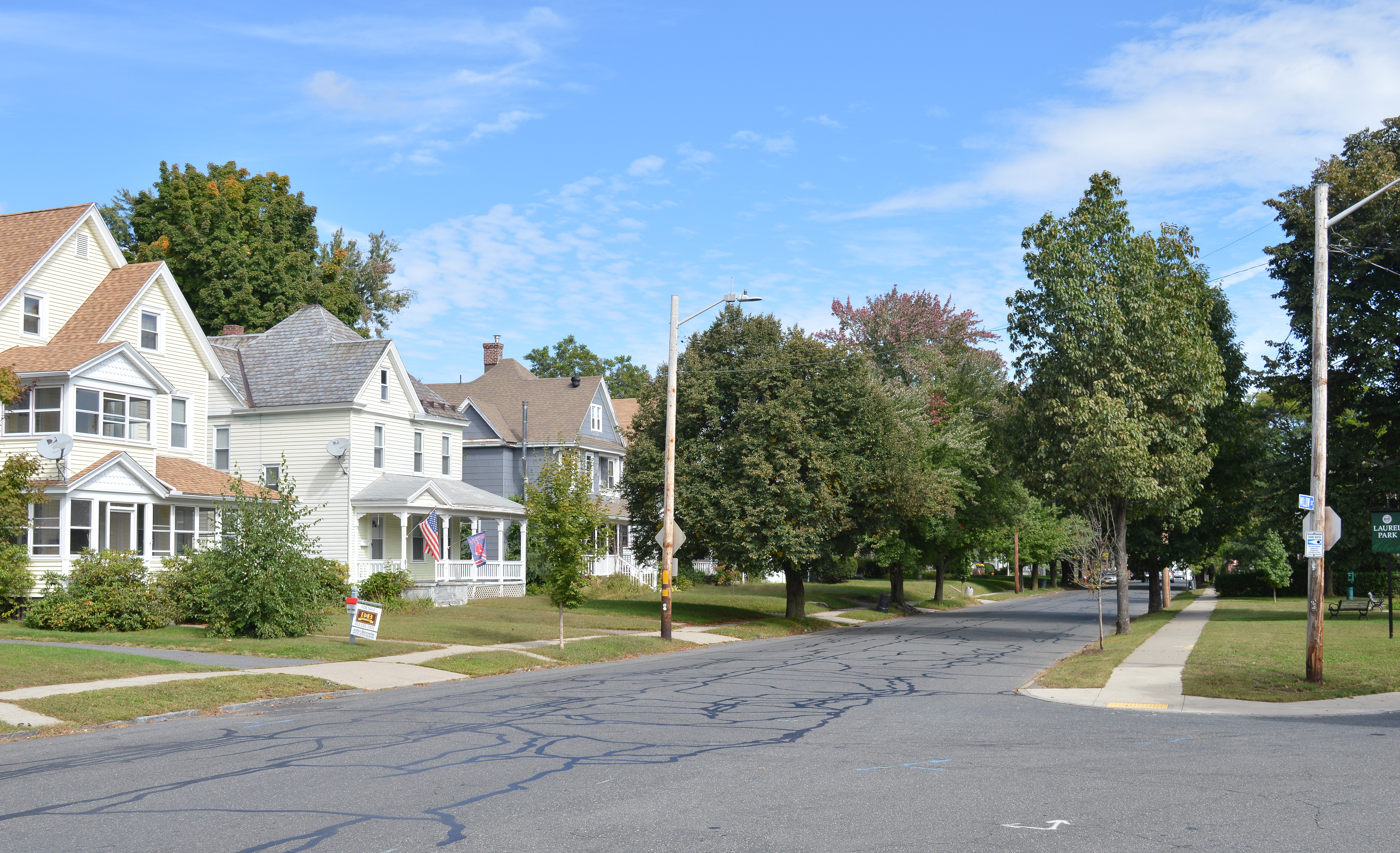
- Top to bottom: Elmwood's commercial center, featuring blocks by George P. B. Alderman; neighborhood homes across from Laurel Park

- Location within Holyoke Location within Massachusetts Location within the United States
- Coordinates: 42°11′45.33″N 72°37′28.32″W
- Country: United States
- State: Massachusetts
- City: Holyoke
- Wards: 3
- Precincts: 3A, 3B
- Settled: c. 1725

Area
  - Total: 0.798 sq mi (2.07 km^{2})
- Elevation: 253 ft (77 m)
- ZIP code: 01040
- Area code: 413
- GNIS feature ID: 609000
- MACRIS ID: HLY.D

Elmwood is a neighborhood in Holyoke, Massachusetts located to the south of the city center, approximately 1 mile (1.6 km) from downtown. Elmwood is historically Holyoke's oldest village; predating the construction of the Hadley Falls Dam, it originated as part of the 3rd parish ("Ireland Parish") of West Springfield, and originally was known as Baptist Village as Holyoke's first and oldest congregation is the First Baptist Church, formally established in 1803, but maintaining a meetinghouse since 1792. Today the neighborhood contains many historic Victorian houses and about 510 acres (210 ha) of mixed residential and commercial zoning, as well as Holyoke High School, William R. Peck Middle School, Fitzpatrick Ice Skating Rink, and Mackenzie Stadium.

== History ==
=== Colonial settlement ===
Baptist Village's origins as a village can be traced to 1725, when the first 5 people were baptized by the pastor of the First Baptist Church of Boston in the Connecticut River directly east of the Elmwood Cemetery, between what is now Ingleside and Springdale. With the village continually visited by a number of lay preachers in its earliest years, the community gained interest in building a house of worship prior to the incorporation of any formal church, the first Baptist Church being incorporated in 1803. In 1792 Baptist Village saw the construction of this first meetinghouse, known colloquially as the "Lord's barn", as funds ran out before its completion; it was described in the church's centennial history as "unsightly" and "excessively plain" in its first years. By 1801, the Congregationalists, having established their first church in the year prior, asked for use of the building in exchange for finishing it and adding permanent seating, to which the Baptists agreed. Before completion, the structure was moved northward to the west side of Northampton Street, just south of present-day Hitchcock Street, where the Blessed Sacrement and Metcalf Schools stand today.

Among the earliest settlers of the village were the names Ely, Chapin, Day, Ball, Rand, Humeston, and Street, who built their homesteads in the vicinity of the Village. From its earliest days the area now identified between Brown Avenue and Northampton Street was occupied largely by the Ely family, among whom, Enoch Ely, was a soldier in the American Revolution. Following the war, Ely would take part in Shays' Rebellion to resist what he saw as unjust taxes upon the former patriot soldiers, and took to hiding in nearby woods to evade soldiers seeking his arrest. Unable to find him, they fired shots into the front door of his home; the bullet-ridden doors were kept on the home until at some point in the late 19th century. After several generations, the last of the Elys to occupy the homestead were "four spinster and bachelor brothers and sisters", and by some time in 1850s or 1860s, the homestead came into the ownership of Horace Brown, for whom Brown Avenue is so named today.

=== Development ===
It was later recounted by one Mrs. Selma Kretschman that in the earliest days of German settlement during the 1860s and 1870s, Brown attempted to sell his land to one of the early settlers of the German community for $300, however not seeing the value of the land at that time, the gentleman turned down the offer saying "I couldn't keep a cow or a goat on the land. It's nothing but rattle boxes and brush".

In the years following 1887, the neighborhood was developed when William S. Loomis purchased a large tract of land to the southeast of Northampton and South Street. With plans to develop this plot into residential tracts, he approached the board of the Holyoke Street Railway, at that time operating a small system of horsecars, who promptly rejected his calls for extending their lines to Elmwood. Through the cooperation of allies and purchase of company stock, Loomis purchased a controlling interest in the company, and immediately moved forward with plans for this construction. The neighborhood would see considerable growth in the following years when these lines were electrified, offering accessible mass transit between the area and many of the factories in which its residents worked. Gradually the neighborhood, saw greater integration into Holyoke, as development continued outward from grid plan, and more workers could easily commute by foot making use of the streetcar, and subsequent bus system.

==== Elmwood Park ====
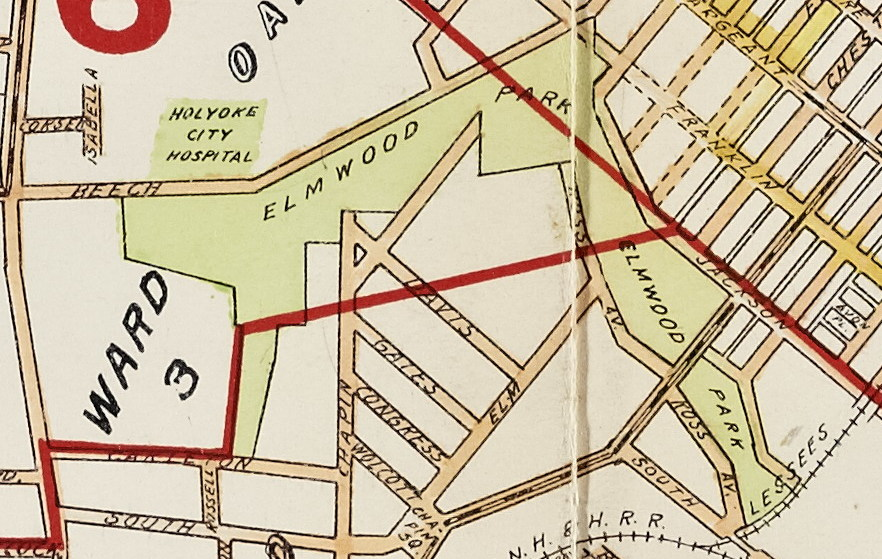
Elmwood Park at its maximum extent, c. 1911

With grading and tree planting beginning circa 1899, in 1902 the Holyoke Water Power Company donated land to the City for the creation of Elmwood Park, a long linear park that separated the neighborhood from downtown that was set up along Dry Brook, from the former Yankee Pedlar house toward the Connecticut River. Developed by the Olmsted Brothers, for its topography it was also sometimes known as Dingle Park. Beginning with the construction of the new Holyoke High School in the 1960s, the park was gradually broken up. With the creation of I-391, the city reimbursed the HWP Company, for use of the land in a manner other than recreation. Today few remnants of the park remain extant with much of it broken up by the high school, Peck School, some housing developments, Mackenzie Stadium, and the onramp for I-391. One of its original decorative staircases can still be seen at Sheard Park at the corners of Maple and Jackson Streets, and at the opposite end of its original footprint is what is now Crozier Field. On maps in the mid-20th century, the area now known as Sheard Park still retained the label of Elmwood Park, with "Sheard Park" on older maps appearing as the patch of land now between Resnic Blvd, Maple and High Street.
