= Elmwood Township, Clay County, Minnesota =

Township in Minnesota, United States

Elmwood Township
- Township
- Location of Elmwood Township, within Clay County, Minnesota

- Location within the state of Minnesota Elmwood Township (the United States)
- Coordinates: 46°45′45″N 96°36′27″W
- Country: United States
- State: Minnesota
- County: Clay

Area
  - Total: 35.7 sq mi (92.4 km^{2})
  - Land: 35.7 sq mi (92.4 km^{2})
  - Water: 0 sq mi (0.0 km^{2})
- Elevation: 925 ft (282 m)

Population (2020)
  - Total: 415
  - Density: 11.6/sq mi (4.49/km^{2})
- Time zone: UTC-6 (Central (CST))
  - Summer (DST): UTC-5 (CDT)
- FIPS code: 27-19052
- GNIS feature ID: 0664088

Elmwood Township is a township in Clay County, Minnesota, United States. The population was 415 at the 2020 census.

Elmwood Township was named for the groves of elm trees along the Buffalo River.

== Geography ==
According to the United States Census Bureau, the township has a total area of 35.7 square miles (92 km^{2}), all land.

== Demographics ==
As of the census of 2000, there were 371 people, 135 households, and 115 families residing in the township. The population density was 10.4 inhabitants per square mile (4.0/km^{2}). There were 147 housing units at an average density of 4.1 per square mile (1.6/km^{2}). The racial makeup of the township was 97.57% White, 0.27% Asian, 0.54% from other races, and 1.62% from two or more races. Hispanic or Latino of any race were 2.16% of the population.

There were 135 households, out of which 36.3% had children under the age of 18 living with them, 77.0% were married couples living together, 5.2% had a female householder with no husband present, and 14.8% were non-families. 12.6% of all households were made up of individuals, and 3.7% had someone living alone who was 65 years of age or older. The average household size was 2.75 and the average family size was 3.00.

In the township the population was spread out, with 26.7% under the age of 18, 4.9% from 18 to 24, 27.5% from 25 to 44, 28.0% from 45 to 64, and 12.9% who were 65 years of age or older. The median age was 39 years. For every 100 females, there were 105.0 males. For every 100 females age 18 and over, there were 112.5 males.

The median income for a household in the township was $58,929, and the median income for a family was $60,000. Males had a median income of $37,500 versus $20,208 for females. The per capita income for the township was $19,666. None of the population or families were below the poverty line.
