= Elmwood Park (Syracuse, New York) =

- U.S. National Register of Historic Places
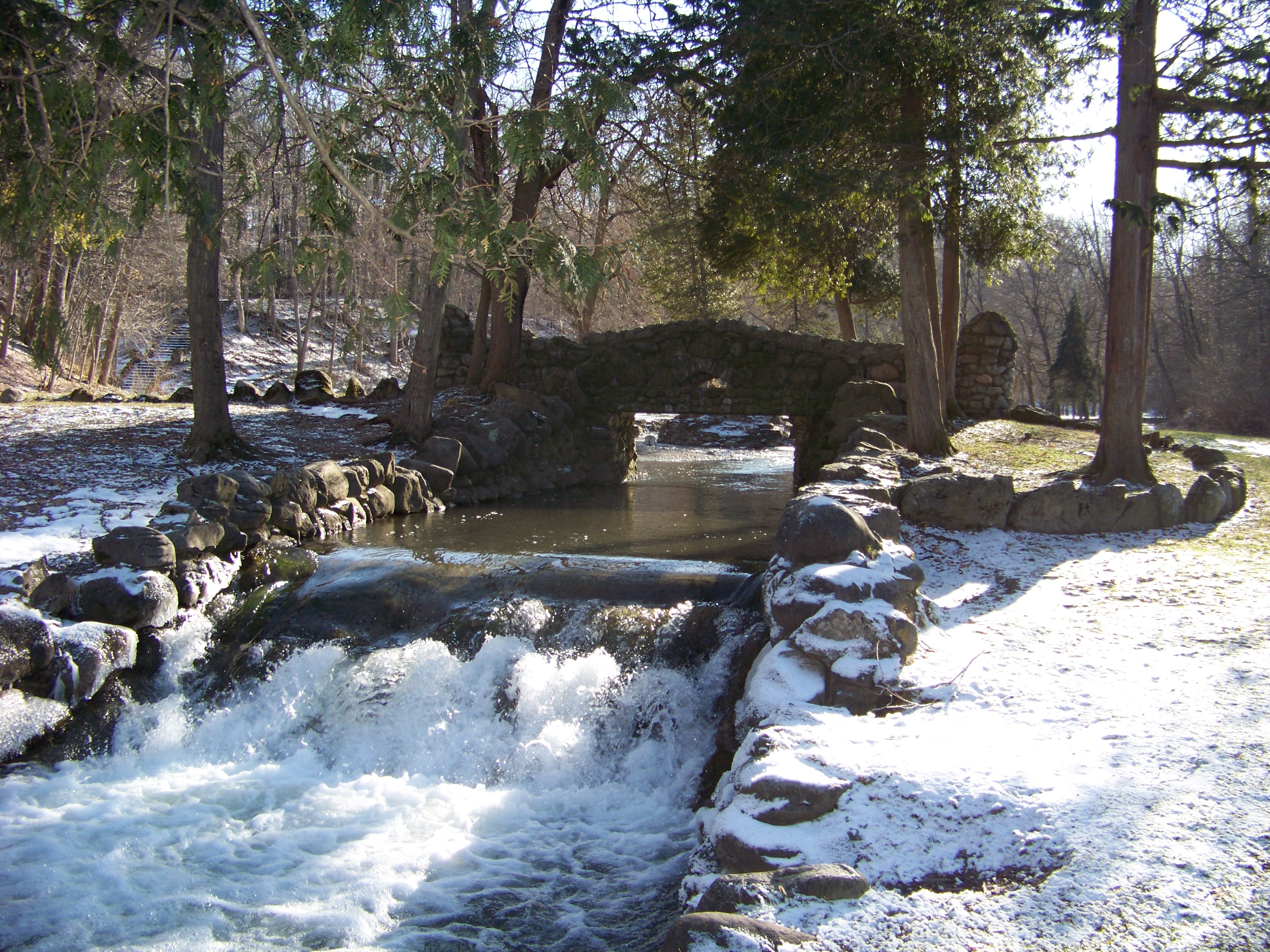

- Location within New York Location within the United States
- Location: Glenwood Ave., South Ave., City Boundary, Syracuse, New York
- Coordinates: 43°1′3″N 76°10′5″W
- Area: 65 acres (26 ha)
- Built: 1890
- Website: Official Website
- MPS: Historic Designed Landscapes of Syracuse MPS
- NRHP reference No.: 05000439
- Added to NRHP: May 19, 2005

Elmwood Park is located in the southwestern portion of Syracuse, New York. The park was originally built and opened as a privately owned park in 1893. It is significant as an example of such parks from the Pleasure Ground Era. After the site was purchased by the city of Syracuse in 1927, bridges, embankments, walls and stairs built of wood and stone were added, making the park also representative of the Reform Park Era. The park was added to the National Register of Historic Places in 2005.

== History ==
Earliest records from 1796 show transfer of land title from Elliot Herrin to Comfort Tyler. Dating back to 1806, a furnace was constructed on the site to cast shot and shells and the park was the location of a battle in the War of 1812. The land was first developed over 17 acres in 1893 by William Pardee as "First Class Temperance Pleasure Resort", which offered family friendly entertainment with facilities such as swan boats operating in two man-made lakes, a merry-go-round, picnic shelters, dance pavilions, a rifle range, a restaurant, concessions, and the natural attractions of bluffs, stream and wildflowers. It opened on Decoration Day (Memorial Day), May 29, 1893.

In May 1896, Pardee sold the resort to Billy McGlory, a saloon keeper and underworld figure in New York City. McGlory renamed the place " “Elmwood Elysium" and attempted to run it from May 1896 but finally closed it on June 21, 1899. McGlory faced intense backlash from the temperance crowd and was driven away after relentless opposition from the locals. After his left, the park was briefly reopened as Dreamland Park, but that failed, and it was left to grow wild. In 1909, a fire burned down many of its old buildings.

In 1927, the city purchased the land and Elmwood was developed into a park, with stone bridges, walls, and stairs to enhance the natural features. In 1933, during the Great Depression, the work relief crews planted of 10,000 nursery plants donated by Syracuse University’s College of Forestry.

== Gallery ==
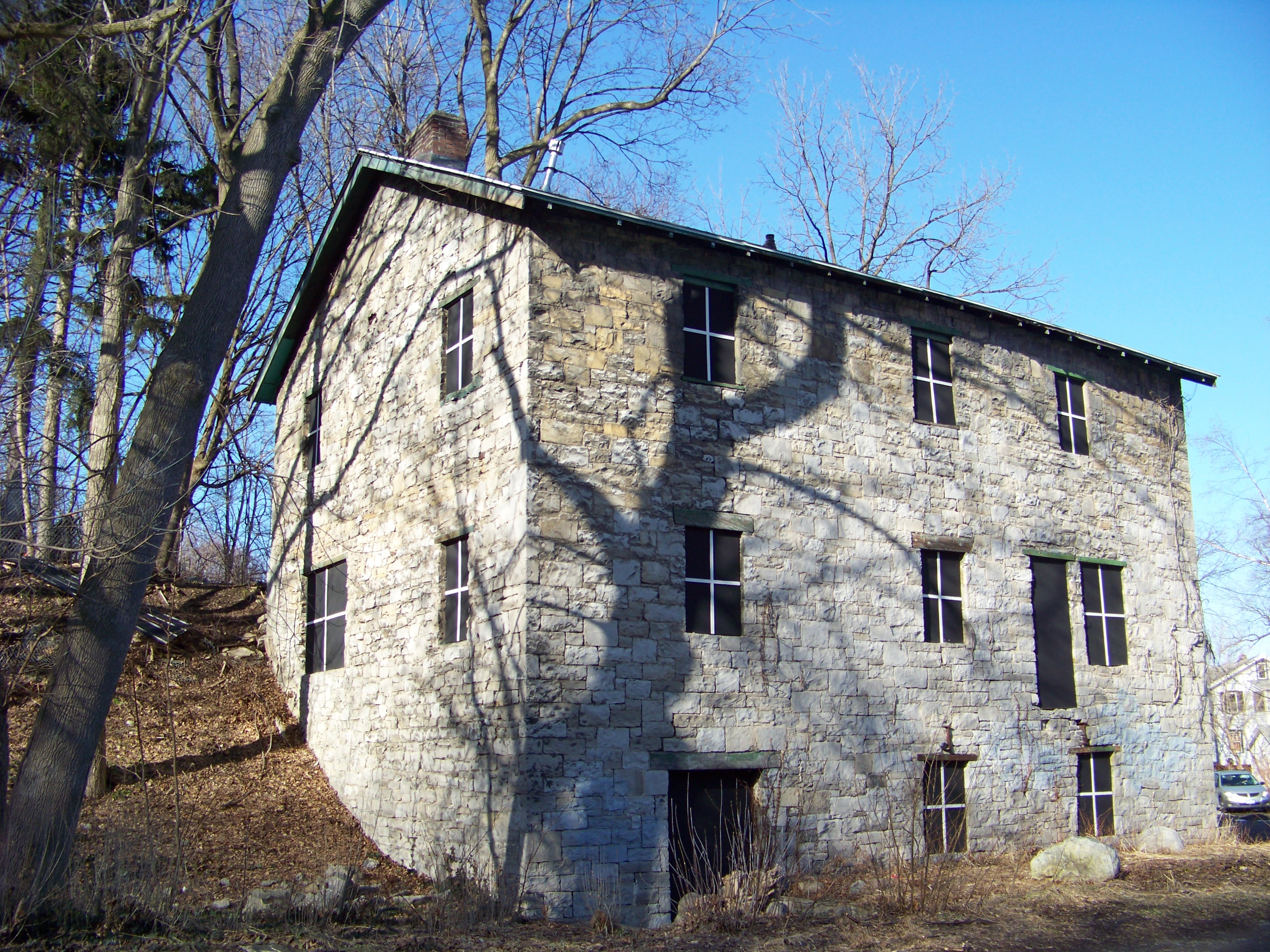
1830s stone mill

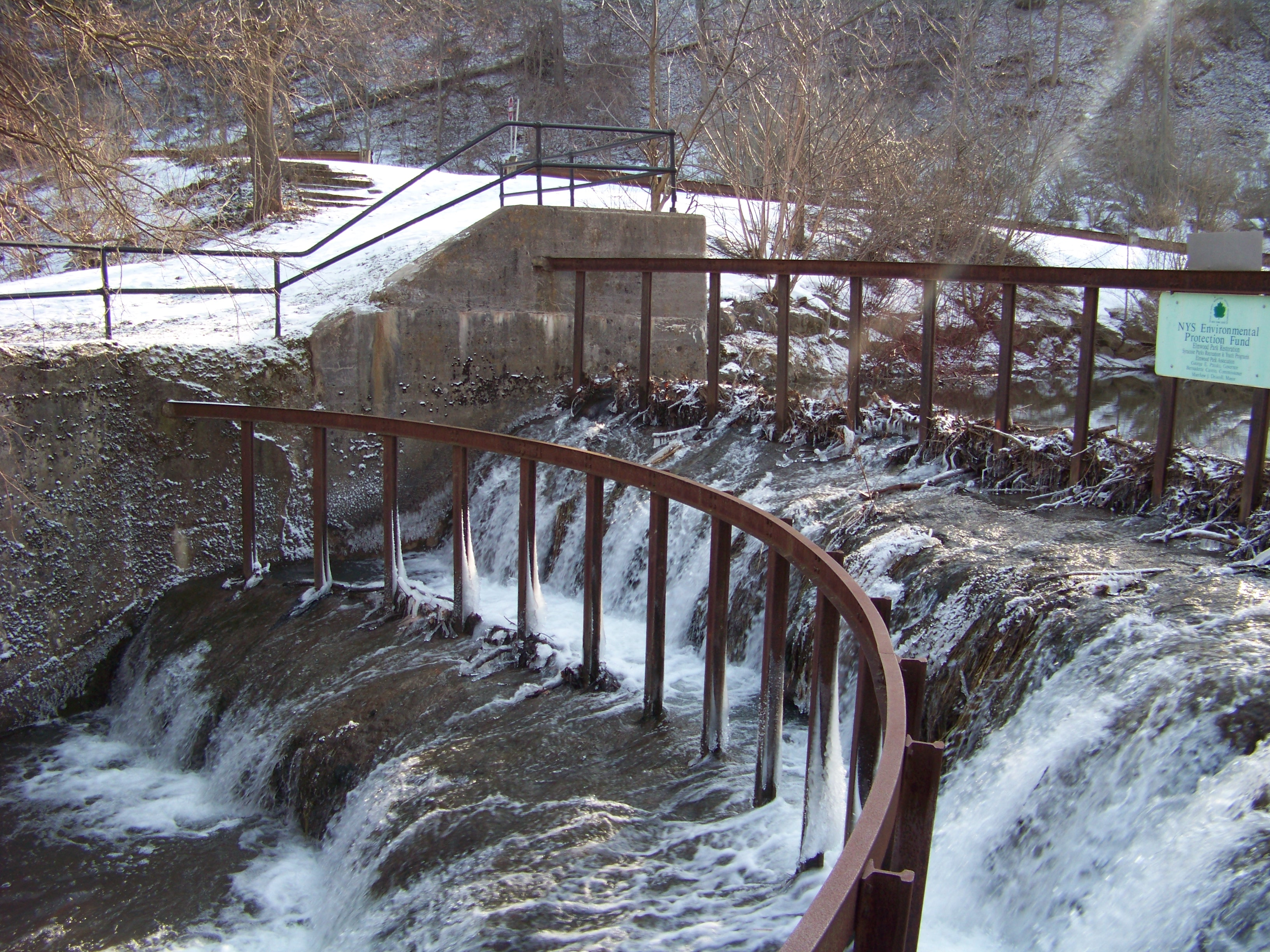
Furnace Brook Dam

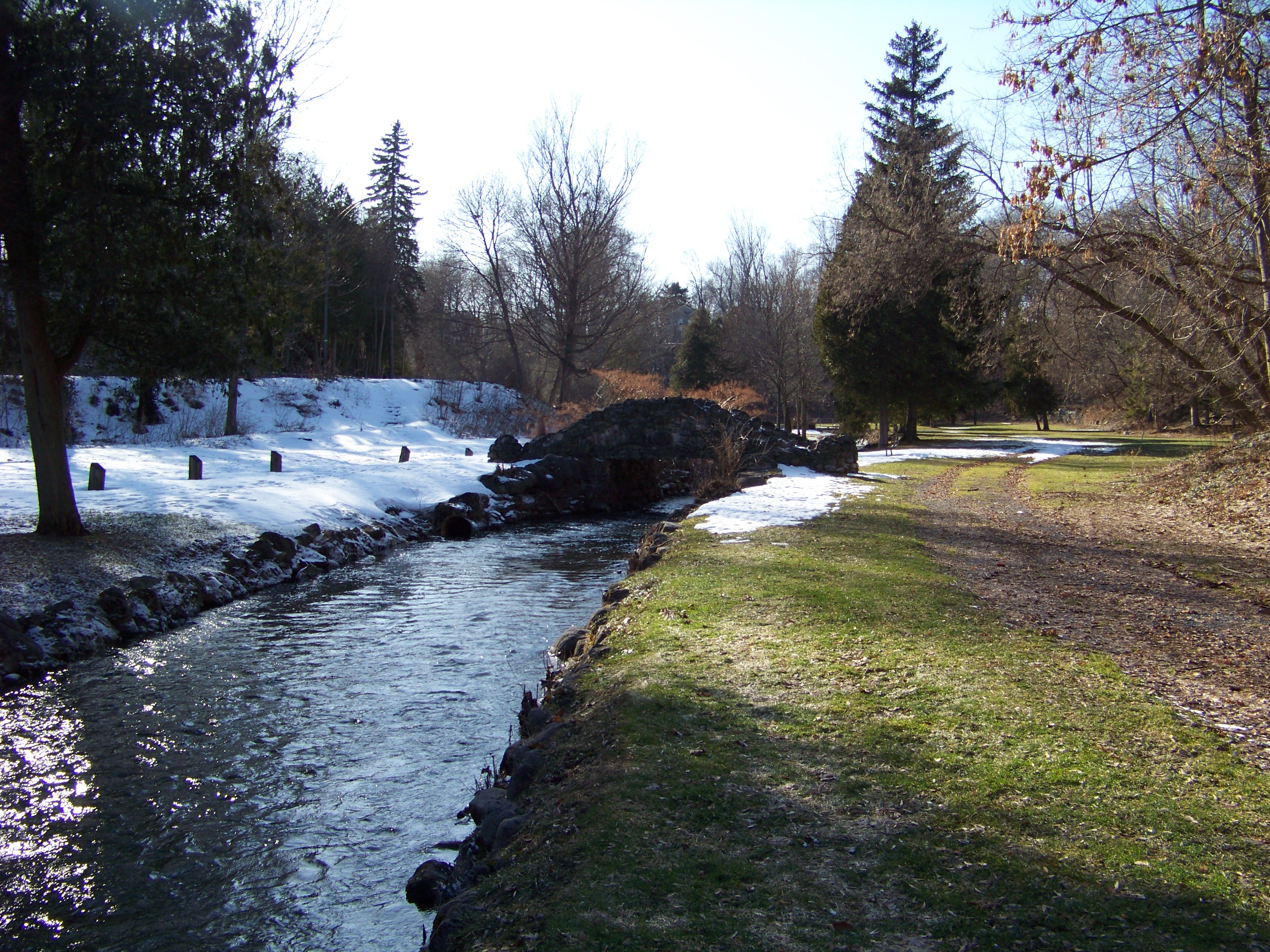
One of two remaining stone bridges over Furnace Brook

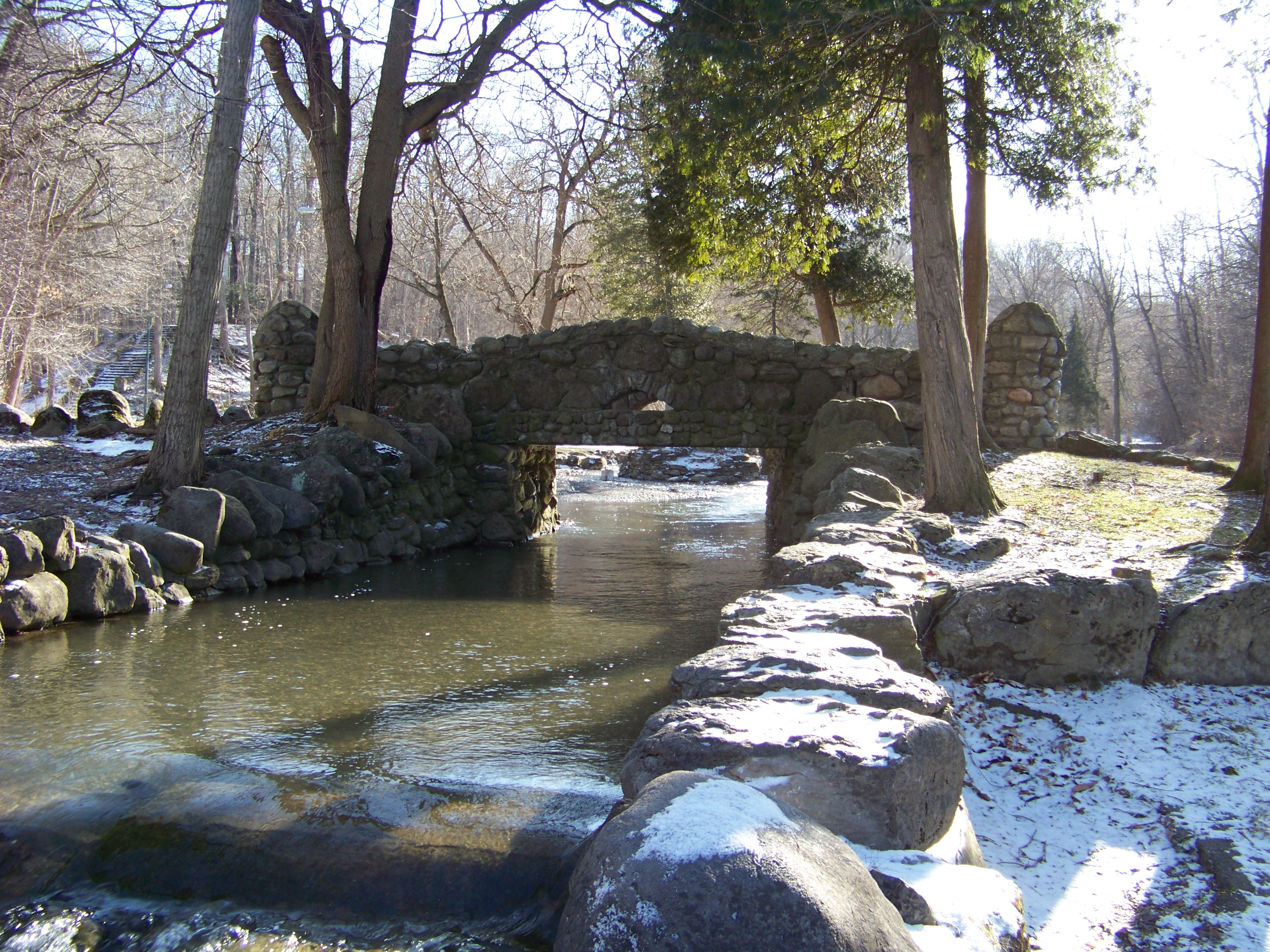
The second remaining stone bridge

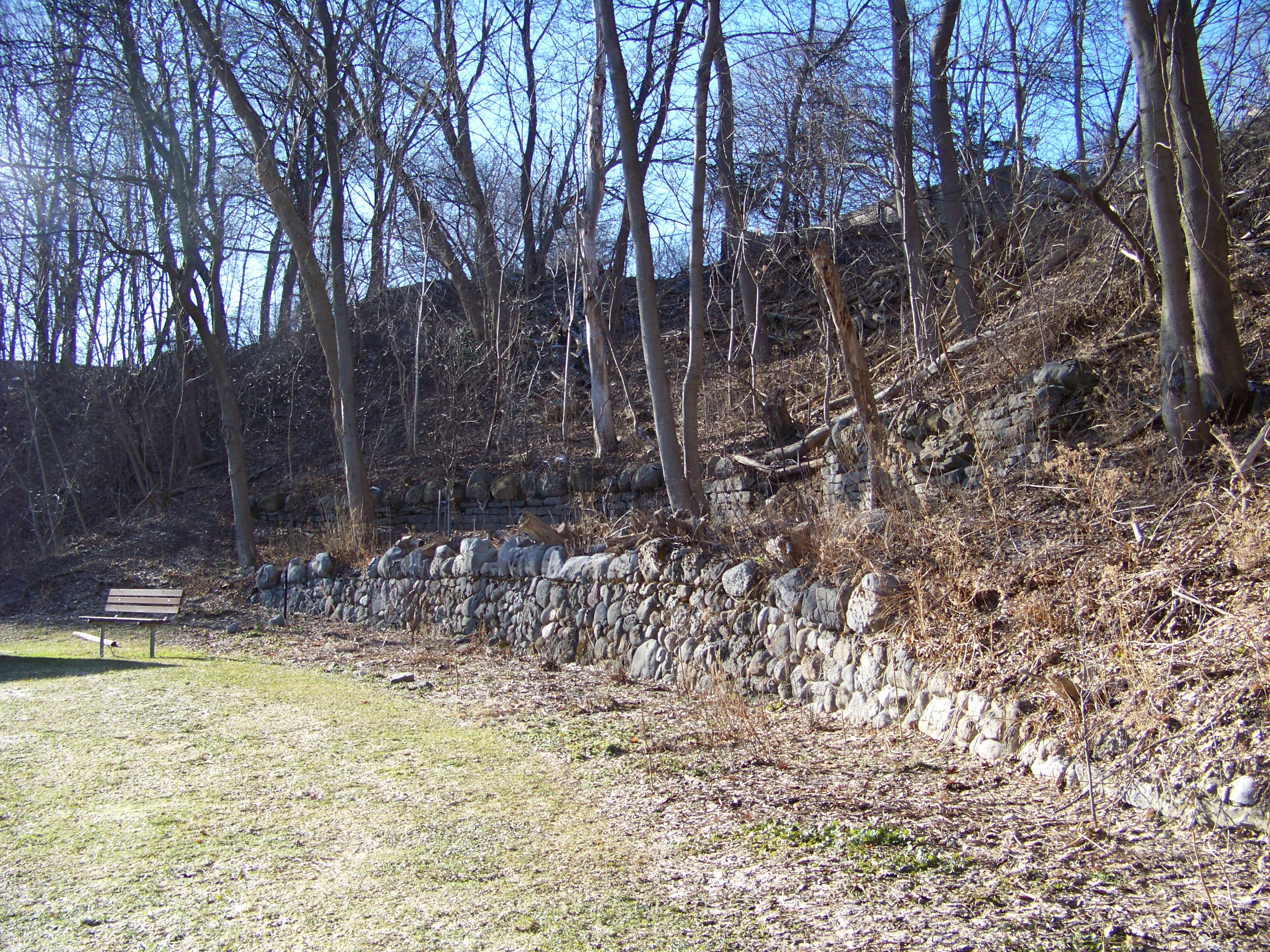
One of many stone retaining walls

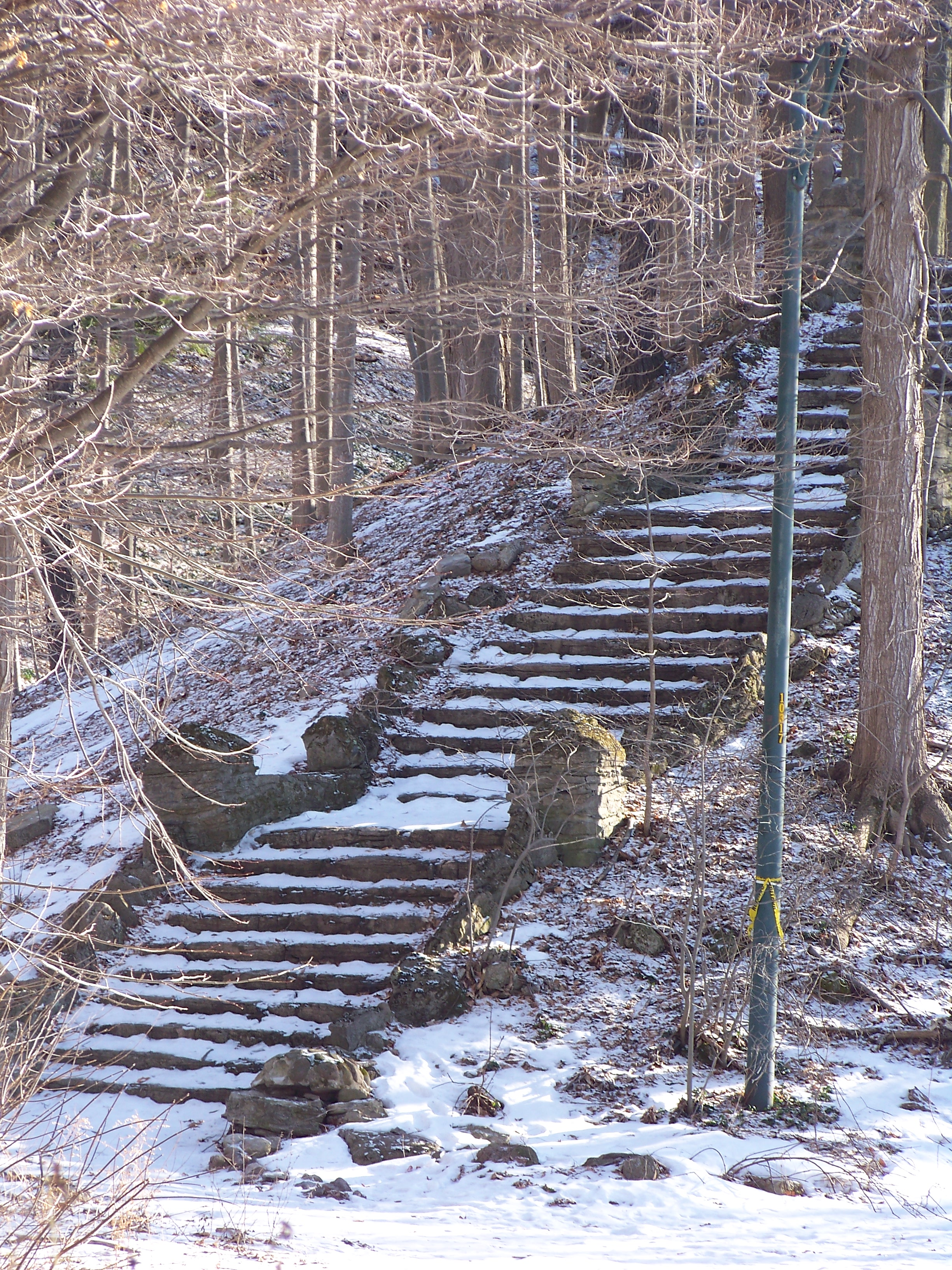
One of thirteen stone stairways

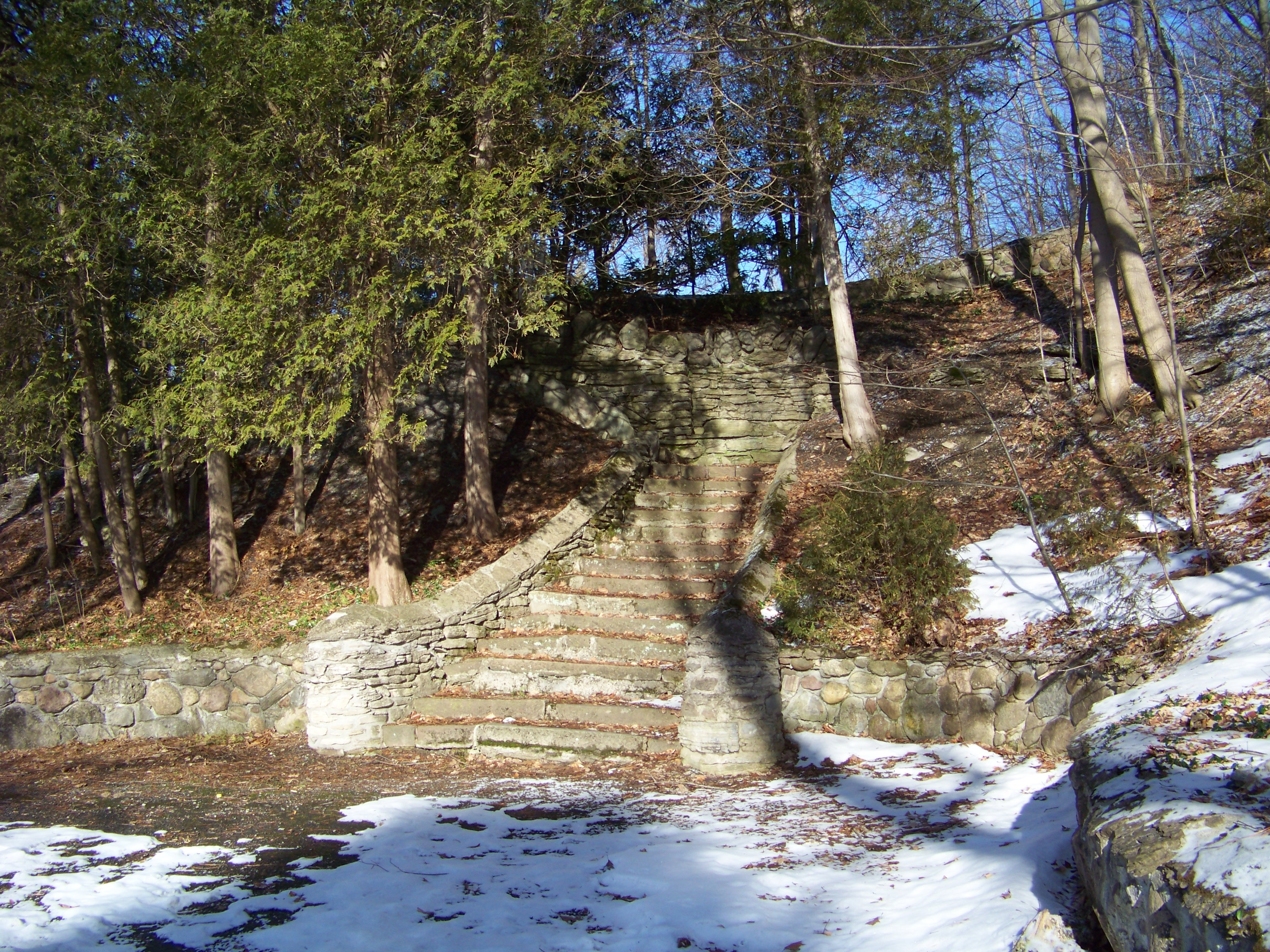
Another stairway

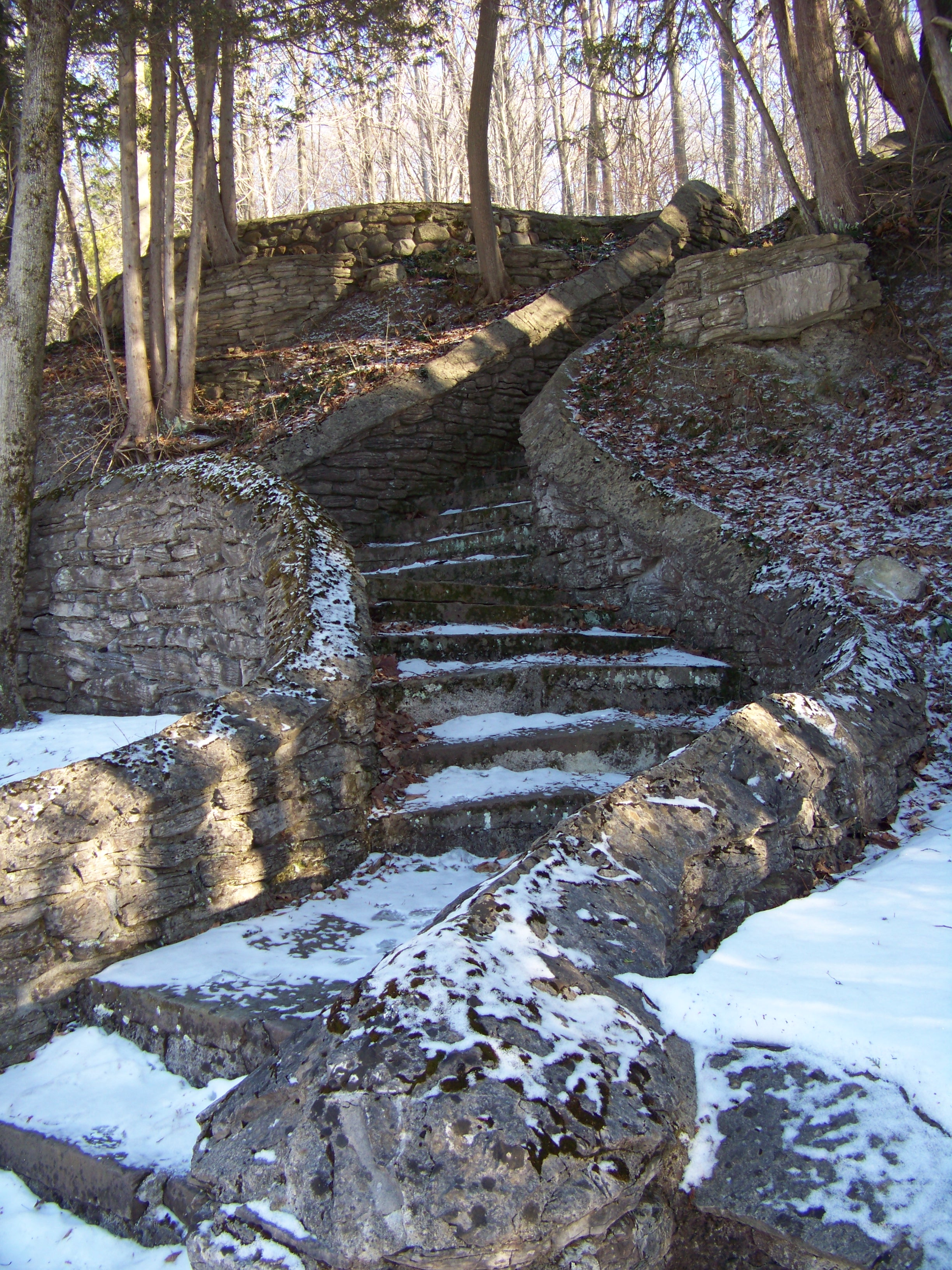
Another stairway

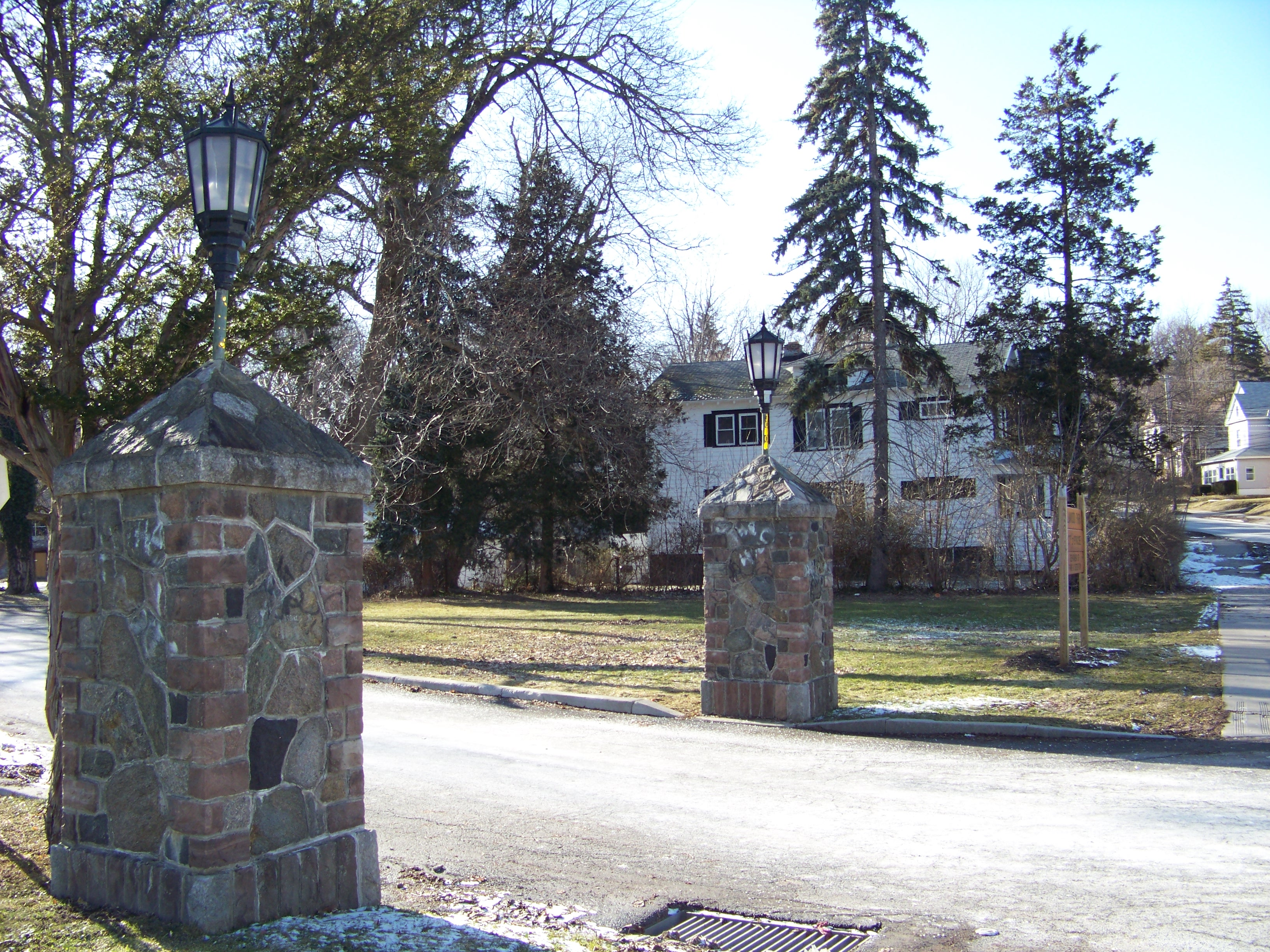
Gateposts at east entrance
