= Brookland-Cayce High School =

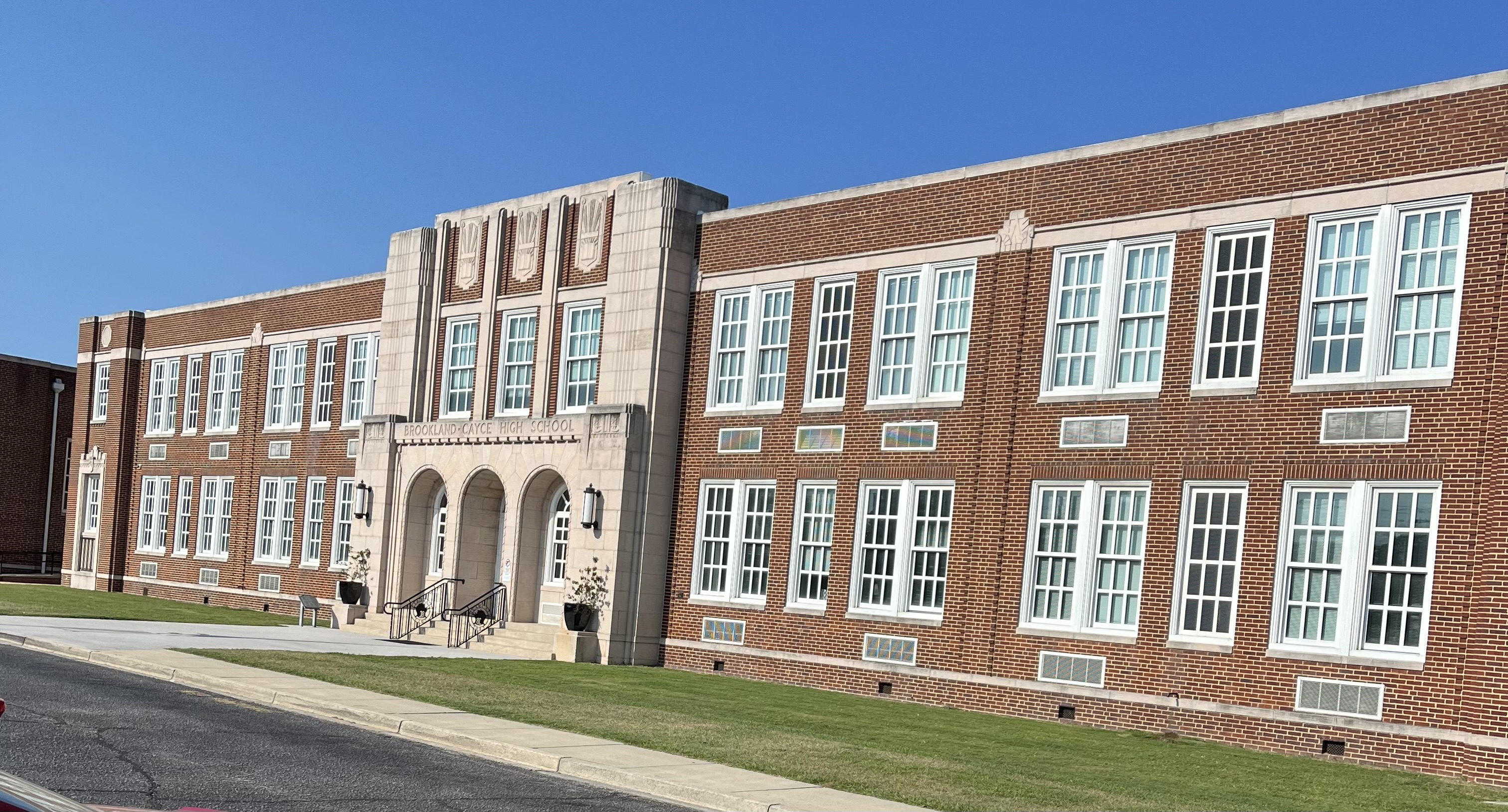
- Brookland-Cayce High School in August 2023

Location
- 1300 State Street; Cayce, South Carolina 29033; United States
- Coordinates: 33°58′55″N 81°3′26″W

Information
- Type: Public; Secondary
- Motto: "Enter to Learn, Go Forth to Serve!"
- Established: 1931 (95 years ago)
- School district: Lexington School District 2
- Principal: Dr. Vance Jones
- Grades: 9–12
- Enrollment: 1,222 (2023–2024)
- Colors: Maroon and black
- Mascot: Bearcat
- Rivals: Airport High School, Dreher High School
- Website: bchs.lex2.org

Brookland-Cayce High School is a public high school located in Cayce, South Carolina, United States. It is part of Lexington County School District 2.

The current principal is Dr. James "Vance" Jones.

== History ==
The school was built in 1932. Named for the cities of Brookland (now West Columbia) and Cayce which it originally served, the school now serves parts of West Columbia, Cayce, South Congaree, Pine Ridge, and Gaston. It is a part of the Lexington County School District Two. When the high school first opened it was a segregated school. Brookland and Cayce were schools for whites. Over the years the schools joined together.

It was founded in order to serve the communities across the Congaree River from Columbia.

== Notable alumni ==
- Kip Bouknight, former professional baseball player
- Mike Derrick, former professional baseball player, Boston Red Sox
- Dakota Dozier, former professional football player, Chicago Bears, Minnesota Vikings, and New York Jets
- Bruce Littlefield, author
- Curtis Loftis, Treasurer of South Carolina
- Ike Okoli, beach wrestler
- Nikki G. Setzler, former South Carolina State Senator
- Jeff Twitty, former professional baseball player, Kansas City Royals
- Dooley Womack, former professional baseball player, Houston Astros, New York Yankees, and Oakland Athletics
- Troy Lesesne, Soccer Coach, Head Coach of DC United
