= Pine Ridge, South Carolina =

- Town
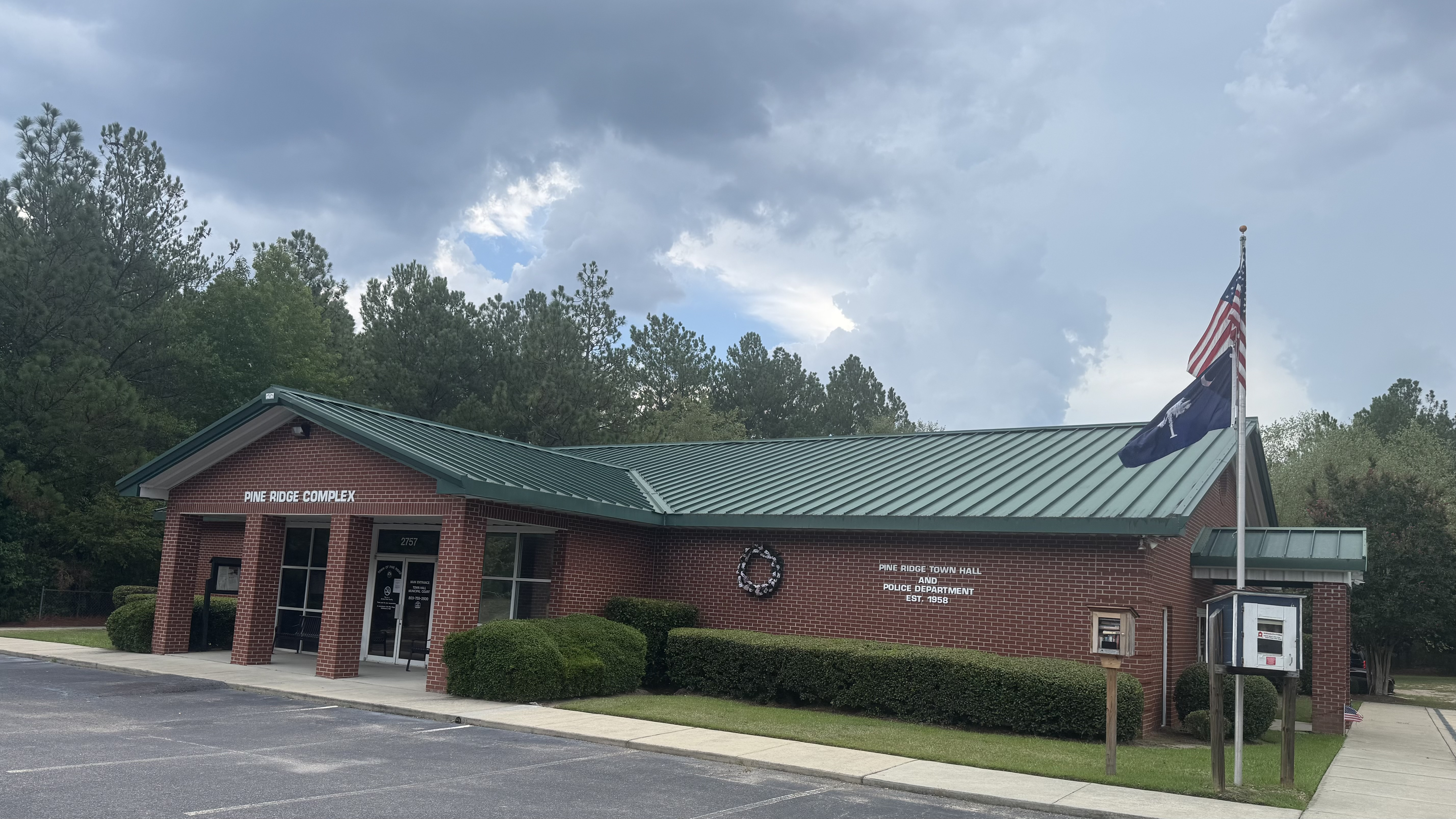
- Pine Ridge Town Hall

- Location in South Carolina
- Coordinates: 33°54′30″N 81°05′52″W
- Country: United States
- State: South Carolina
- County: Lexington
- Established: 1958

Area
  - Total: 4.71 sq mi (12.21 km^{2})
  - Land: 4.70 sq mi (12.17 km^{2})
  - Water: 0.015 sq mi (0.04 km^{2})
- Elevation: 341 ft (104 m)

Population (2020)
  - Total: 2,167
  - Density: 461.2/sq mi (178.08/km^{2})
- Time zone: UTC-5 (Eastern (EST))
  - Summer (DST): UTC-4 (EDT)
- ZIP code: 29169 (West Columbia)
- Area codes: 803, 839
- FIPS code: 45-56950
- GNIS feature ID: 2407120
- Website: www.townofpineridgesc.com

Pine Ridge is a town in Lexington County, South Carolina, United States. As of the 2020 census, Pine Ridge had a population of 2,167. It is part of the Columbia Metropolitan Statistical Area.

== Geography ==
According to the United States Census Bureau, the town has a total area of 3.7 square miles (9.7 km^{2}), of which 3.7 square miles (9.6 km^{2}) is land and 0.27% is water. Pine Ridge is east of and directly adjacent to the town of South Congaree. It is also located to the south of the Columbia Metropolitan Airport and Springdale, and to the southwest of the cities of Cayce, and West Columbia.

== Demographics ==
Historical population
Census	Pop.	Note	%±
1960	329		—
1970	633		92.4%
1980	1,287		103.3%
1990	1,731		34.5%
2000	1,593		−8.0%
2010	2,064		29.6%
2020	2,167		5.0%
U.S. Decennial Census

As of the census of 2000, there were 1,593 people, 606 households, and 458 families residing in the town. The population density was 429.1 inhabitants per square mile (165.7/km^{2}). There were 626 housing units at an average density of 168.6 per square mile (65.1/km^{2}). The racial makeup of the town was 92.78% White, 5.15% African American, 0.31% Native American, 0.88% Asian, 0.19% from other races, and 0.69% from two or more races. Hispanic or Latino of any race were 1.19% of the population.

There were 606 households, out of which 37.5% had children under the age of 18 living with them, 61.7% were married couples living together, 10.4% had a female householder with no husband present, and 24.4% were non-families. 19.8% of all households were made up of individuals, and 5.1% had someone living alone who was 65 years of age or older. The average household size was 2.63 and the average family size was 3.05.

In the town, the population was spread out, with 26.6% under the age of 18, 7.6% from 18 to 24, 29.8% from 25 to 44, 28.4% from 45 to 64, and 7.6% who were 65 years of age or older. The median age was 37 years. For every 100 females, there were 95.0 males. For every 100 females age 18 and over, there were 92.9 males.

The median income for a household in the town was $48,750, and the median income for a family was $54,514. Males had a median income of $35,243 versus $28,846 for females. The per capita income for the town was $18,534. About 6.6% of families and 9.1% of the population were below the poverty line, including 12.2% of those under age 18 and 17.5% of those age 65 or over.

== Education ==
Pine Ridge is served by Lexington County School District 2 and is zoned for Wood Elementary School and Pine Ridge Middle school in Pine Ridge as well as Airport High School in West Columbia.

The South Congaree-Pine Ridge Branch of the Lexington County Public Library serves both communities.
