= Sad About the Times =

Compilation album by Various artists
- Released: May 17, 2019
- Genre: Rock; folk; West Coast blues
- Length: 1:08:12
- Label: Anthology Recordings; Mexican Summer
- Producer: Mikey Young; Keith Abrahamsson

Sad About the Times is a compilation album made up of 15 obscure songs from the 1970s that "could have been hits", curated by Mikey Young (Total Control / Eddy Current Suppression Ring) and Keith Abrahamsson (founder of Anthology Recordings and head of A&R). It was published by Anthology Recordings, a reissue imprint of Mexican Summer, as a companion to Follow the Sun – a collection of 70s FM through a distinctly Australian lens assembled by the same duo.

Sad About the Times is an "exploration of 70s FM folk, soft rock, west coast jangle, power pop and late night jams" by North American artists.

On October 29, 2019, Anthology reissued three 1970s albums from artists featured on the album: Art Lown's Piper Oz the Hound, Boz Metzdorf's Signs of Seasons, and David Chalmers' Primeval Road.

== Track listing ==
Some digital editions of the album remove Loaves & Fishes, Illusion, Holy River, Am I Supposed to Let it By Again, and the eponymous Sad About the Times, shortening the total length of the album to 58:04.

Track listing
No.	Title	Writer(s)	Performed by	Length
1.	"Sad About the Times"		West	2:32
2.	"Lonely City"		Hollins Ferry	4:23
3.	"N.Y. Survivor"		Randy & The Goats	3:50
4.	"Loaves & Fishes"		Willow	3:07
5.	"Deep Blue Sea"		Art Lown	2:43
6.	"Tomorrow is Gone"		Jode	3:10
7.	"Illusion"		Norma Tanega	3:40
8.	"If You Can Want"		Perth County Conspiracy	4:28
9.	"Hotel Room"		David Chalmers	4:00
10.	"Another Lonely Day"		Jim Spencer	2:11
11.	"Absolute Zero"		Hoover	3:35
12.	"Holy River"		Space Opera	5:24
13.	"Am I Supposed to Let it By Again (Above the Covers)"		Roger Rodier	4:03
14.	"Paula's Song"		Emmett Finley	3:40
15.	"Sing For Me"		Sky (20)	4:27
16.	"Running Water"		Smubbs	5:04
17.	"Here Comes the Sun"	Maurice Springfield Jr.	Oliver Klaus	2:32
18.	"Wolf"		Antonia Lamb	3:18
19.	"Lover Now Alone"		Kevin Vicalvi	3:06
20.	"Sails Across The Sea"		Boz Metzdorf	5:52
21.	"Maybe Someday/Maybe Never"		Dennis Stoner	6:32
Total length:				1:18:05
