= Electric Circus (nightclub) =

Nightclub in New York City, US

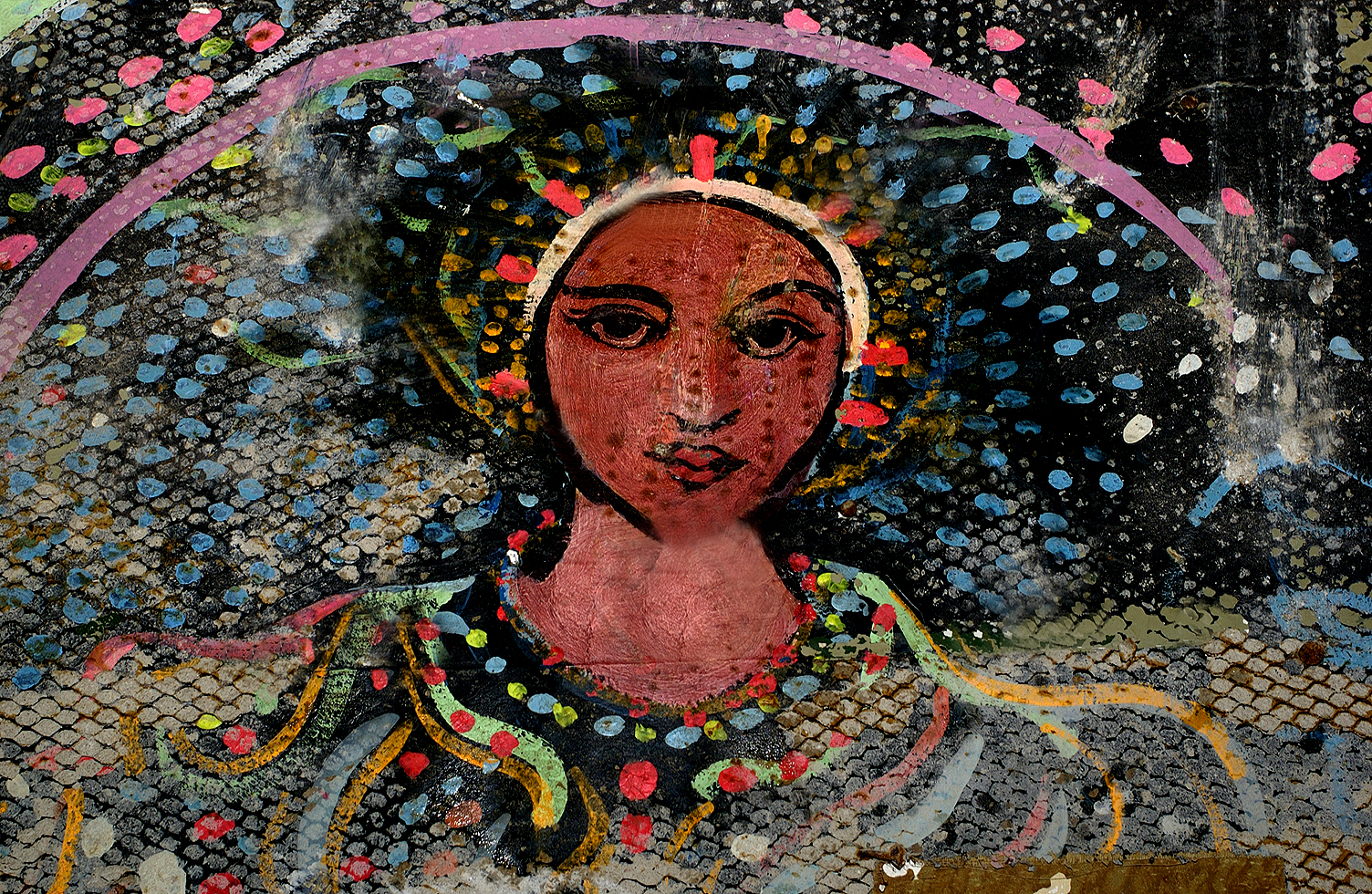
- Dayglo art inside The Electric Circus
- Interactive map of Electric Circus
- Address: 19-25 St. Marks Place
- Location: Manhattan
- Coordinates: 40°43′45″N 73°59′19″W
- Type: Nightclub

Construction
- Built: 1831
- Opened: 1967
- Closed: 1971

The Electric Circus was a nightclub located at 19–25 St. Marks Place in the East Village neighborhood of Manhattan, New York City. Opened in 1967, it became known for its combination of live music, psychedelic light shows, circus performances, and experimental theater. The venue occupied a former ballroom known as Arlington Hall, later used by the Polish National Home. As The Dom, it was a performance space for Andy Warhol's multimedia production, the Exploding Plastic Inevitable, in 1966. Designed as an immersive entertainment environment, the Electric Circus became a prominent part of New York City's countercultural nightlife of the late 1960s. It closed in August 1971 following a period of declining popularity and negative publicity after a bombing injured 15 people in March 1970. The building was subsequently used as an addiction treatment and residential facility before being converted into apartments and retail space

== History ==
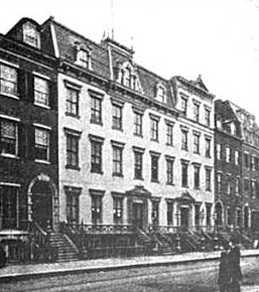
Arlington Hall, c.1892

=== Early history ===
The cavernous ballroom, which featured a balcony, originated as four townhouses built in 1831. As the neighborhood developed into the center of Little Germany, Manhattan, home to a large population of German immigrants, the Arlon Club, a German musical society, purchased 19 and 21 St. Marks Place in 1870 for use as its clubhouse. After the club relocated, a real estate developer acquired 19, 21, and 23 St. Marks Place between 1887 and 1888 and combined the properties into a ballroom and community hall known as Arlington Hall. The venue hosted weddings, dances, political gatherings, union meetings, and other events. Notable speakers included Police Commissioner Theodore Roosevelt, who appeared in 1895, and newspaper publisher William Randolph Hearst, who spoke there in 1905.

In 1914, Arlington Hall was the site of a shootout between the Jewish gang led by "Dopey" Benny Fein and the Italian-American mob led by Jack Sirocco. The confrontation was associated with the shift in power from Jewish to Italian-American organized crime in New York City.

During the 1920s, the buildings were acquired by the Polish National Home, which combined them with the adjoining property at 25 St. Marks Place. The complex subsequently housed Polish organizations and a Polish restaurant.

=== The Dom and the Balloon Farm ===
By the late 1950s, the bohemian culture and nightlife formerly associated with Greenwich Village were expanding into the neighborhood that became known as the East Village, alongside the influence of the Beat Generation. The Polish National Home became the Dom Restaurant, whose name derived from Polski Dom Narodowy (Polish National Home). Stanley Tolkin operated Stanley's Bar in the basement, slightly below street level. Artists Jackie Cassen and Rudi Stern began leasing the ballroom above the bar for their Theater of Light performances.

In April 1966, artist and filmmaker Andy Warhol and filmmaker Paul Morrissey rented the venue, redecorated the interior, and converted it into a nightclub. The Velvet Underground performed as the house band, accompanying their music with projected underground films, photographs, and elaborate lighting effects. The multimedia performances, known as the Exploding Plastic Inevitable, combined music, film, and visual art in an immersive environment. The production subsequently toured other venues.

Later in 1966, under the management of Albert Grossman, the club briefly operated as the Balloon Farm.

=== The Electric Circus ===
In 1967, the lease was transferred to Brandt Freeman International, Ltd., the general partner of the Electric Circus Company, and the Electric Circus was opened by Jerry Brandt in June. Cat Mother & the All Night Newsboys was among the first house bands engaged under the new management.

In 1969, the architectural firm Gwathmey & Henderson renovated the interior, introducing white walls, curved windows, and elaborate lighting installations. The resulting Electric Circus combined live music, light shows, circus acts, and experimental theater in a nightclub setting.

Jugglers using fire and trapeze artists performed between musical sets, while strobe lights illuminated a large dance floor and multiple projectors displayed images and home-movie footage. The venue offered varied seating, including sofas, and emphasized an immersive, multisensory experience. One contemporary account described it as "New York's ultimate mixed-media pleasure dome," noting that its hallucinogenic light displays attracted audiences from across New York society. The club's combination of dancing, performance art, and elaborate visual effects also anticipated elements of the emerging disco culture and the development of discotheques.

By 1970, the countercultural hippie movement associated with the club was waning. On March 22, a small bomb exploded on the dance floor, injuring 15 people. Reports attributed the bombing to Ishmael Brown, a student alleged to have been associated with the Black Panther Party, although the organization denied any connection to the incident. The resulting negative publicity contributed to the club's decline, and the Electric Circus closed in August 1971.

=== Later uses ===
During the 1980s and 1990s, the building housed the All Craft Center, an addiction treatment and residential facility. In 2000, the building was sold to a developer and the venue was later gut renovated. The building substantially altered the interior, removing the ballroom and converting the property into apartments and retail space.

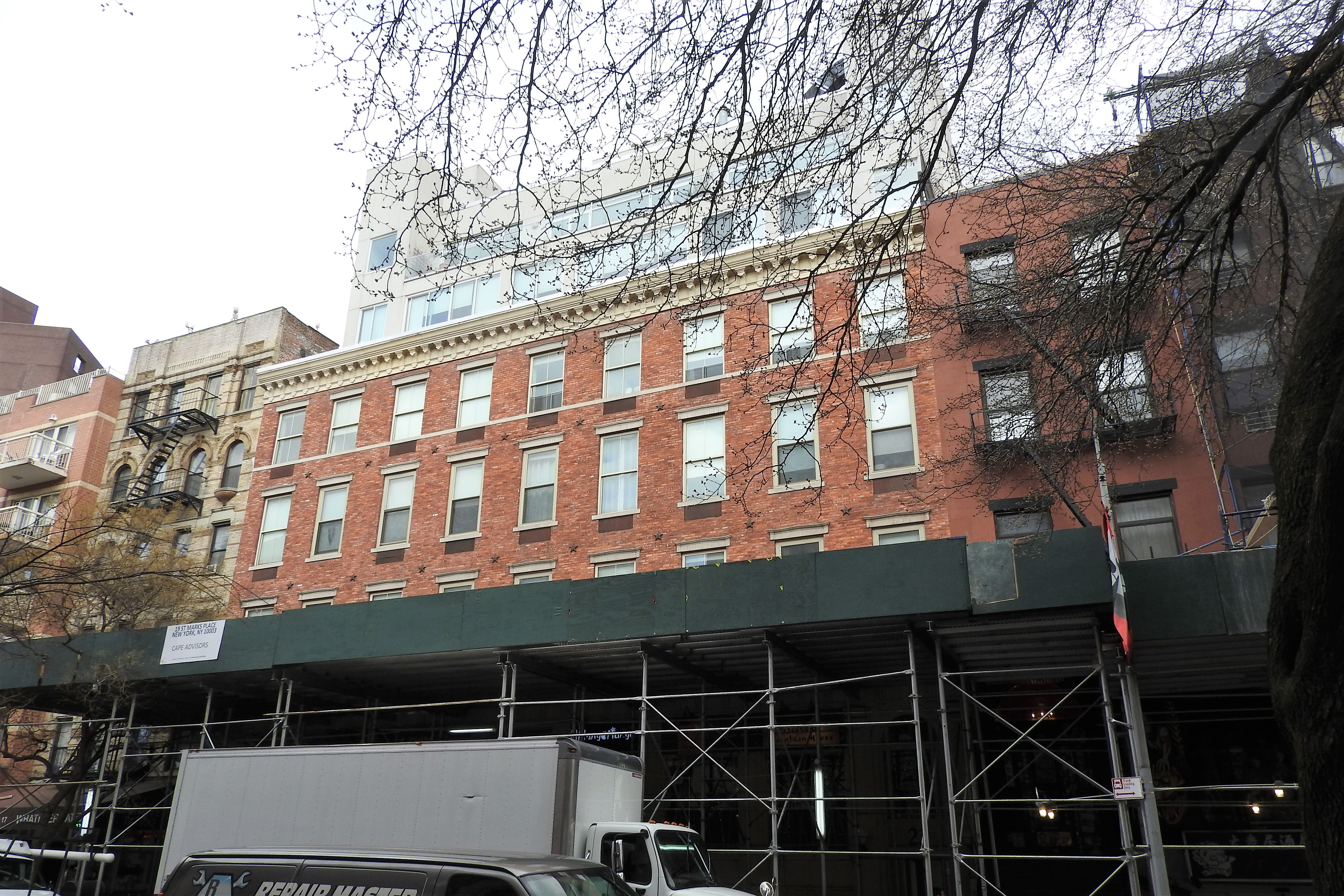
19-25 St. Marks Place in 2018

== List of performers ==
- The Velvet Underground
- Morton Subotnick
- The Chambers Brothers
- The Grateful Dead
- Ike & Tina Turner
- Sly & The Family Stone
- The Voices of East Harlem
- Ten Wheel Drive
- Raven
- Deep Purple
- The Smubbs
- Soft White Underbelly
- Rock Island
- Terry Riley
- Wishbone Ash

== In popular culture ==
The Electric Circus is mentioned (as a spontaneously fabricated supposed avant garde novel) in the television show “Succession” (S2 E5 approx. 20m). The actual club is depicted in a scene of Mad Men season 6, episode 3 ("To Have and To Hold", set in early 1968), during which Joan Harris and her friend Kate go out on the town.

The Electric Circus is also mentioned in Andrew Holleran’s novel Dancer from the Dance as the building where Malone lives. It is described as "a discotheque that began fashionable and white, and eventually became unfashionable and black."
