= South Congaree, South Carolina =

- Town
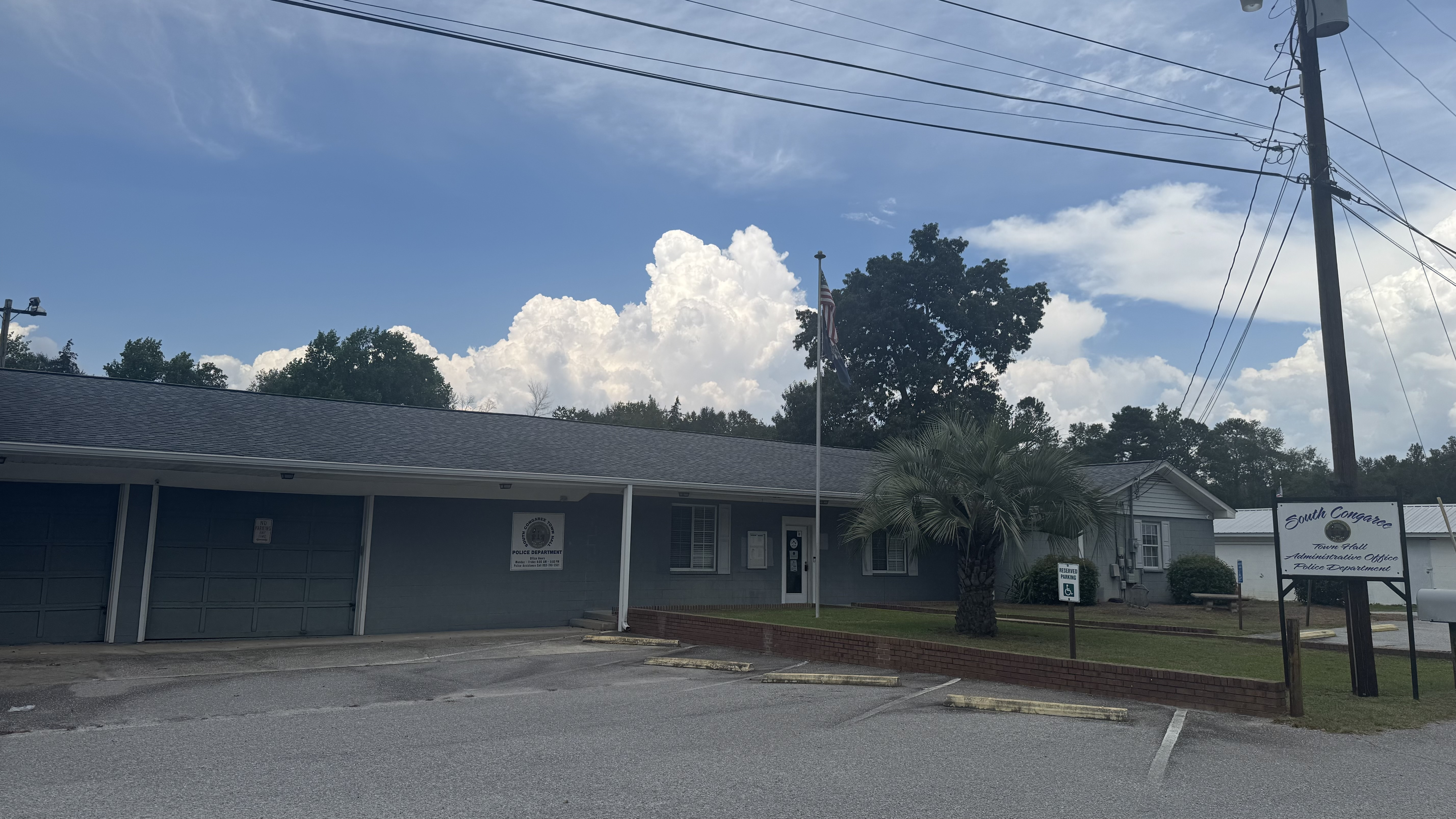
- South Congaree Town Hall

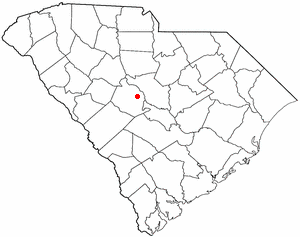
- Location of South Congaree, South Carolina
- Coordinates: 33°54′35″N 81°07′54″W
- Country: United States
- State: South Carolina
- County: Lexington
- Incorporated: 1957

Area
  - Total: 3.33 sq mi (8.63 km^{2})
  - Land: 3.29 sq mi (8.52 km^{2})
  - Water: 0.042 sq mi (0.11 km^{2})
- Elevation: 190 ft (58 m)

Population (2020)
  - Total: 2,377
  - Density: 723.0/sq mi (279.15/km^{2})
- Time zone: UTC-5 (Eastern (EST))
  - Summer (DST): UTC-4 (EDT)
- ZIP code: 29169 (West Columbia)
- Area codes: 803, 839
- FIPS code: 45-67705
- GNIS feature ID: 2407370
- Website: www.townofsouthcongaree.org

South Congaree is a town in the eastern part of Lexington County, South Carolina, United States. As of the 2020 census, South Congaree had a population of 2,377. It is part of the Columbia, South Carolina Metropolitan Statistical Area. The town is named after the Congaree people, an Indigenous people of the Southeastern Woodlands who once lived along the Congaree River.

== Geography ==
According to the United States Census Bureau, the town has a total area of 3.2 square miles (8.4 km^{2}), of which 3.2 square miles (8.3 km^{2}) is land and 0.04 square mile (0.1 km^{2}) (0.92%) is water. South Congaree is west of and directly adjacent to the town of Pine Ridge and is approximately 23 miles northwest of Congaree National Park. It is also located to the southwest of the Columbia Metropolitan Airport, Springdale, Cayce, and West Columbia, and east of the CDPs of Red Bank, White Knoll, and Edmund.

== Demographics ==
Historical population
Census	Pop.	Note	%±
1960	650		—
1970	1,434		120.6%
1980	2,113		47.4%
1990	2,406		13.9%
2000	2,266		−5.8%
2010	2,306		1.8%
2020	2,377		3.1%
U.S. Decennial Census

As of the census of 2000, there were 2,266 people, 890 households, and 652 families residing in the town. The population density was 703.8 inhabitants per square mile (271.7/km^{2}). There were 1,002 housing units at an average density of 311.2 per square mile (120.2/km^{2}). The racial makeup of the town was 88.35% White, 7.90% African American, 0.84% Native American, 1.46% Asian, 0.44% from other races, and 1.02% from two or more races. Hispanic or Latino of any race were 1.46% of the population.

There were 890 households, out of which 33.8% had children under the age of 18 living with them, 52.6% were married couples living together, 15.6% had a female householder with no husband present, and 26.7% were non-families. 22.0% of all households were made up of individuals, and 6.6% had someone living alone who was 65 years of age or older. The average household size was 2.55 and the average family size was 2.95.

In the town, the population was spread out, with 26.1% under the age of 18, 9.4% from 18 to 24, 28.7% from 25 to 44, 25.8% from 45 to 64, and 10.1% who were 65 years of age or older. The median age was 36 years. For every 100 females, there were 92.9 males. For every 100 females age 18 and over, there were 92.3 males.

The median income for a household in the town was $36,995, and the median income for a family was $39,250. Males had a median income of $30,606 versus $21,866 for females. The per capita income for the town was $15,543. About 13.7% of families and 12.5% of the population were below the poverty line, including 14.7% of those under age 18 and 7.1% of those age 65 or over.

== Education ==
South Congaree is served by Lexington County School District 2 and is zoned for Airport High School in West Columbia. Most of the town is zoned for Congaree Elementary School in South Congaree and Fulmer Middle School in West Columbia, but its farthest east portion is zoned for Wood Elementary School and Pine Ridge Middle school in Pine Ridge.

The South Congaree-Pine Ridge Branch of the Lexington County Public Library serves both communities.
