= Gaston, South Carolina =

- Town
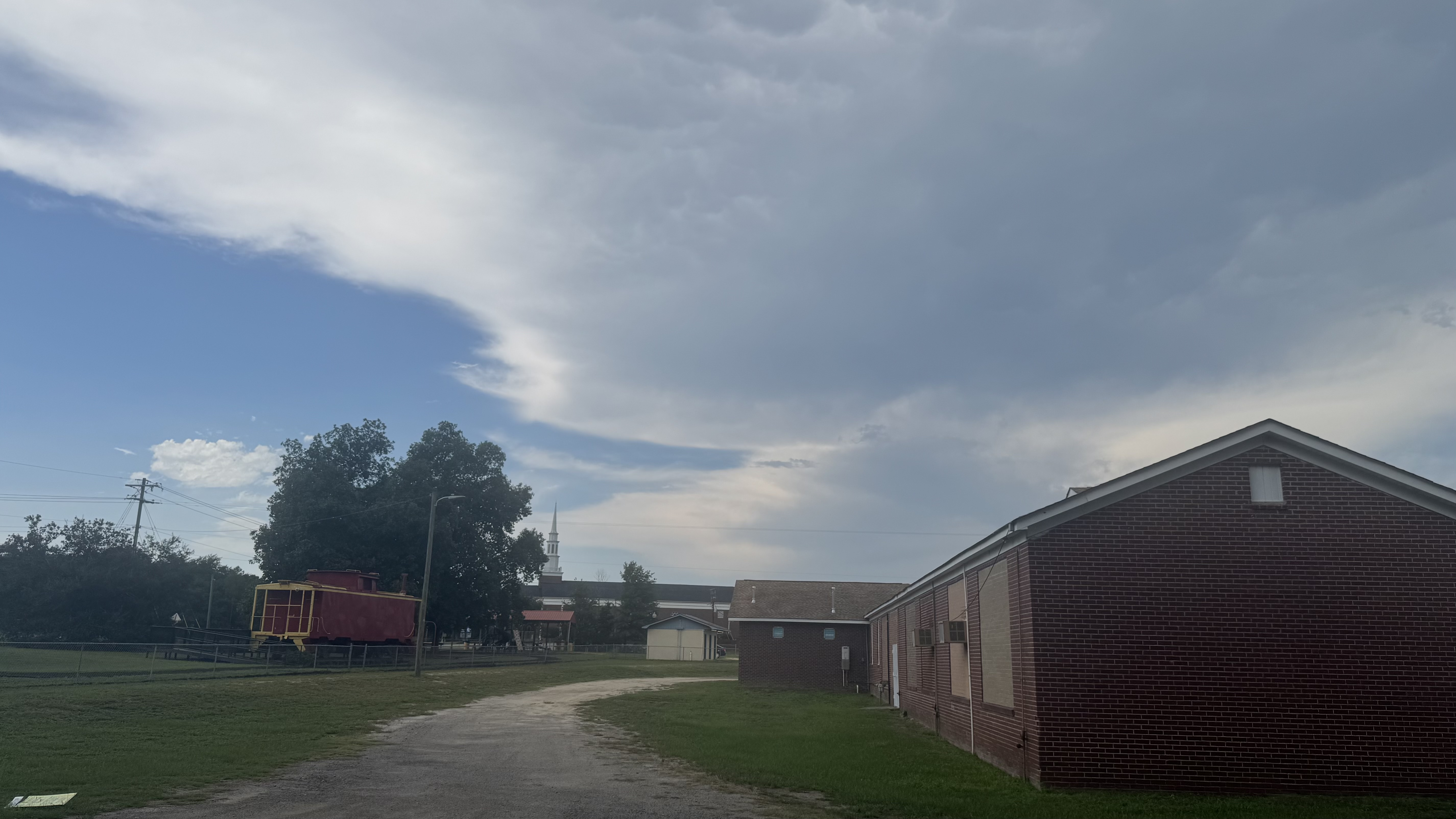
- Town Hall and Park of Gaston

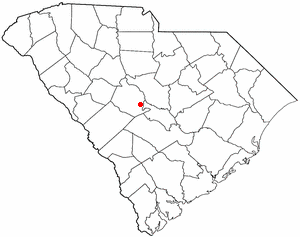
- Location of Gaston, South Carolina
- Coordinates: 33°50′57″N 81°06′03″W
- Country: United States
- State: South Carolina
- County: Lexington

Area
  - Total: 5.31 sq mi (13.76 km^{2})
  - Land: 5.31 sq mi (13.76 km^{2})
  - Water: 0 sq mi (0.00 km^{2})
- Elevation: 482 ft (147 m)

Population (2020)
  - Total: 1,608
  - Density: 302.6/sq mi (116.82/km^{2})
- Time zone: UTC-5 (Eastern (EST))
  - Summer (DST): UTC-4 (EDT)
- ZIP code: 29053
- Area codes: 803, 839
- FIPS code: 45-28780
- GNIS feature ID: 2406549
- Website: www.gastonsc.org

Gaston is a town in Lexington County, South Carolina, United States. As of the 2020 census, Gaston had a population of 1,608. It is part of the Columbia, South Carolina Metropolitan Statistical Area.

== History ==
The area was occupied by sawmills, family farms, and turpentine stills until about 1890.

A line of the South Bound Railroad was built through the settlement in 1891, and a station called "Gaston" was erected, named after Gaston Raoul, a railroad engineer's nephew.

Gaston incorporated in 1894, and the town grew slowly in population, with forestry and farming dominant industries in the area.

Three African Americans accused of rape were murdered by vigilantes in 1893, and "their mangled bodies were left hanging beside the railroad as a warning to other African-Americans."

U.S. Route 321 enabled Gaston to prosper in the 20th century.

Gaston was incorporated into Lexington County in 1975.

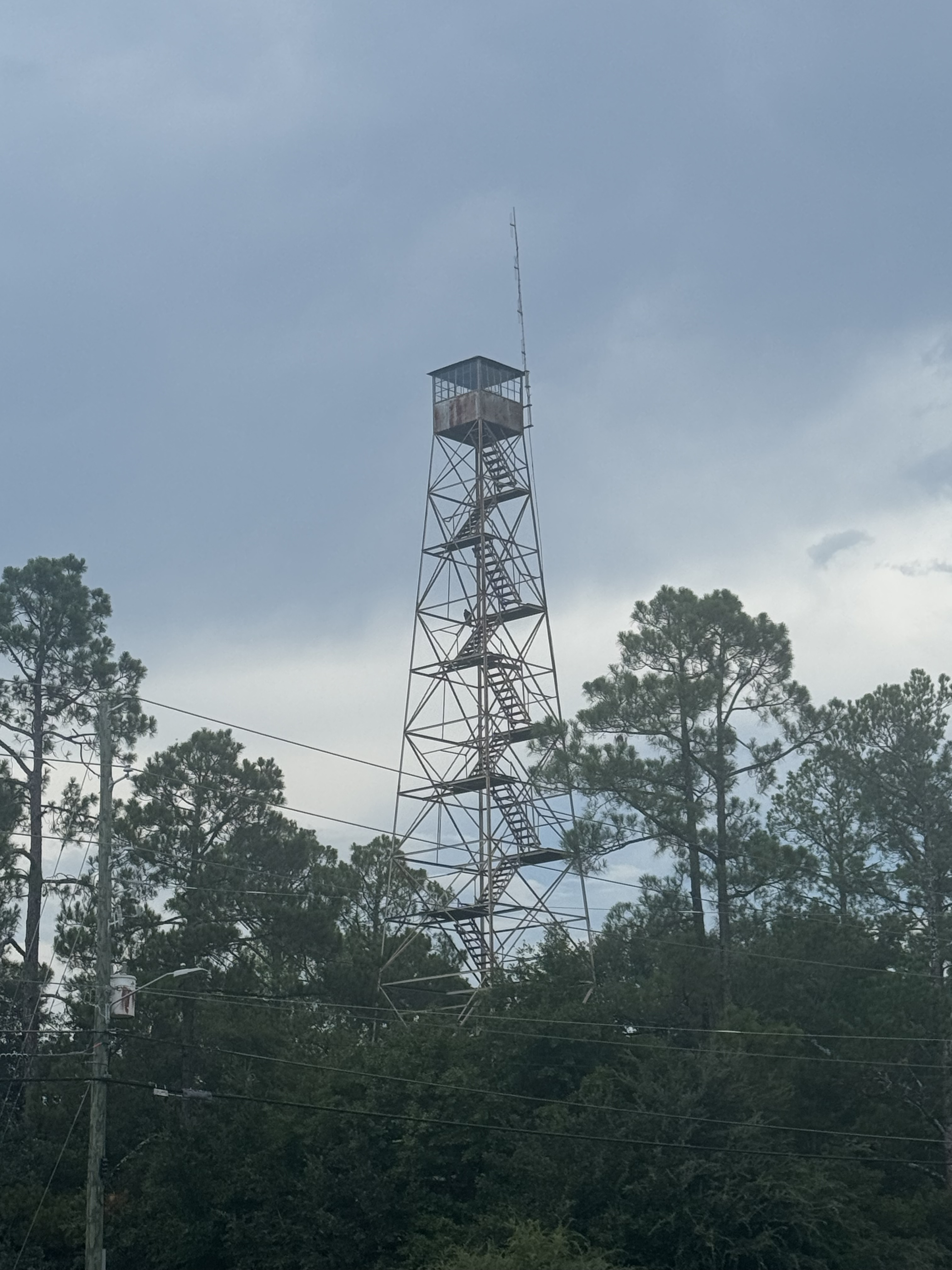
Gaston Fire Tower, a 499 foot tall fire lookout tower

The Gaston Fire Tower, a fire lookout tower first built in 1936 standing at 499 feet tall, was added to the National Historic Lookout Register in 2013.

== Geography ==
Gaston is located on the banks of Bull Swamp Creek. According to the United States Census Bureau, the town has a total area of 3.4 square miles (8.8 km^{2}), all land.

== Demographics ==
Historical population
Census	Pop.	Note	%±
1980	960		—
1990	984		2.5%
2000	1,304		32.5%
2010	1,645		26.2%
2020	1,608		−2.2%
U.S. Decennial Census

=== 2020 census ===
Gaston racial composition
Race	Num.	Perc.
White (non-Hispanic)	1,043	64.86%
Black or African American (non-Hispanic)	228	14.18%
Native American	6	0.37%
Asian	10	0.62%
Pacific Islander	1	0.06%
Other/Mixed	100	6.22%
Hispanic or Latino	220	13.68%

As of the 2020 United States census, there were 1,608 people, 684 households, and 458 families residing in the town.

=== 2000 census ===
As of the census of 2000, there were 1,304 people, 484 households, and 366 families residing in the town. The population density was 380.6 inhabitants per square mile (147.0/km^{2}). There were 532 housing units at an average density of 155.3 per square mile (60.0/km^{2}). The racial makeup of the town was 95.71% White, 1.07% African American, 0.84% Native American, 0.46% from other races, and 1.92% from two or more races. Hispanic or Latino of any race were 1.92% of the population.

There were 484 households, out of which 40.9% had children under the age of 18 living with them, 60.1% were married couples living together, 10.7% had a female householder with no husband present, and 24.2% were non-families. 19.4% of all households were made up of individuals, and 4.8% had someone living alone who was 65 years of age or older. The average household size was 2.69 and the average family size was 3.08.

In the town, the population was spread out, with 28.9% under the age of 18, 8.1% from 18 to 24, 31.9% from 25 to 44, 22.9% from 45 to 64, and 8.1% who were 65 years of age or older. The median age was 35 years. For every 100 females, there were 97.0 males. For every 100 females age 18 and over, there were 96.0 males.

The median income for a household in the town was $31,411, and the median income for a family was $32,917. Males had a median income of $27,857 versus $21,680 for females. The per capita income for the town was $13,546. About 17.1% of families and 18.2% of the population were below the poverty line, including 26.1% of those under age 18 and 9.0% of those age 65 or over.

== Economy ==
Gaston relies mostly on business fees.

== Government ==
In 1975, Gaston town council adopted a mayor-council form of government. The mayor serves as chief executive officer.

== Education ==
Gaston area students attend schools in Lexington School District 4 and Lexington School District 2, Frances Mack Intermediate and Sandhills Middle are located in Gaston, while the Early Childhood Center, Sandhills Primary, Sandhills Elementary, Swansea High Freshmen Academy and Swansea High School are located in Neighboring Swansea, South Carolina. Parts of Gaston are also zoned for Airport High School in West Columbia, Pine Ridge Middle School in Pine Ridge, RH Fulmer Middle School in West Columbia, and Congaree Elementary School in South Congaree.

Gaston has its own branch library of the Lexington County Public Library.
