= Springdale, South Carolina =

Springdale is the name of some places in the U.S. state of South Carolina:

- Springdale, Lancaster County, South Carolina
- Springdale, Lexington County, South Carolina
