= Dumas Seed Company warehouse =

Coordinates: 46°44′0.7″N 117°10′40.2″W

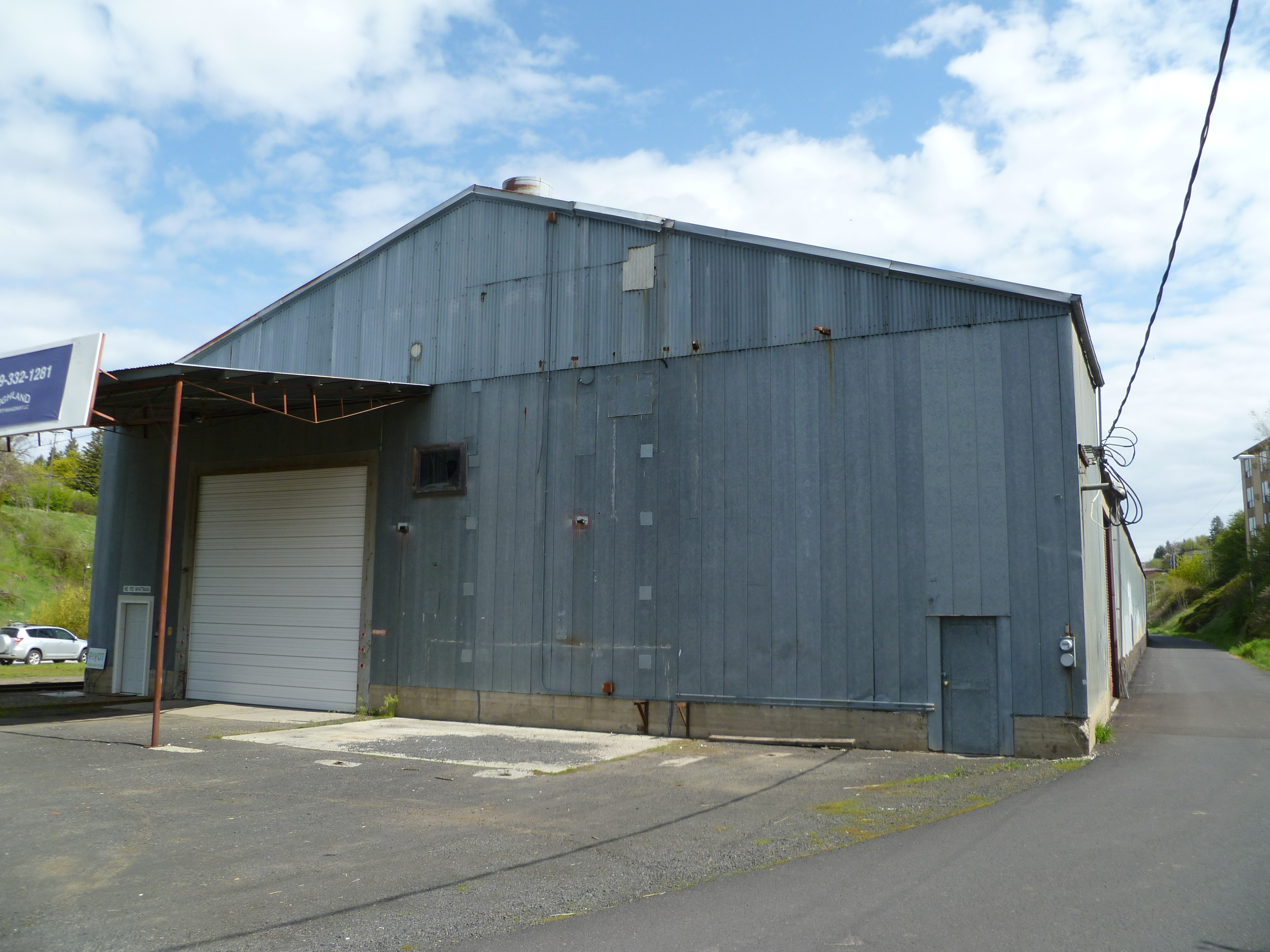
Dumas Seed Company dry pea warehouse, South Facade

The Dumas Seed Company warehouse, located in Pullman, Washington at 110 Whitman Street, is a steel pre-engineered structure that served for several decades as an agriculture storage facility for dry peas harvested from farms around the Palouse region. The warehouse served as a storage depot for a series of agricultural growers, before its conversion into an RV and boat storage facility in 2002, its current owners. Centrally located in Pullman's "Original Town Neighborhood," the structure is also central to the city's historical roots in agriculture and farming.

== Peas on the Palouse ==
Dry peas are an important rotation crop in the Palouse region, along with lentils and garbanzo beans. As a nitrogen-fixating plant, the legumes replenish the soil and enhance the area's wheat production. Farmers harvest the variety of peas planted on the Palouse after they are completely dry. The purpose of seed warehouses is to store the peas until the farmer is ready to sell them, either for a higher price or for supplemental operating funds. Local farms produce twenty-five percent of the nation's dry peas and lentil. During WW II, area farmers shipped 60 million pounds of dry peas to war-torn areas. Dry peas fulfill a variety of purposes for both human and animal consumption, including Campbell's split-pea soup packets and as a supplemental ingredient for animal feed.

== Edwin A. Dumas ==
Edwin A. Dumas purchased the seed warehouse to store dry peas in the early 1960s. Dumas, a long-time resident of Pullman whose father established the first commercial apple orchard in the state of Washington, began working in the agricultural industry as a field man for the Green Giant Company after high school graduation. In 1942, Dumas began his career in pea processing, working for Klemgard Pea Processing Company in Pullman. In 1959, he purchased a competitor's seed company, Washburn-Wilson Seed Co. of Moscow, Idaho, and then the Klemgard Company in 1960. He incorporated both companies into one, establishing the Dumas Seed Company of Pullman and Moscow. Dumas was a visionary for the industry, always looking for new uses for dry peas and lentils. Among his innovations was "Ed's Bread, which he created using his own recipes, and sold at the local IGA supermarket. He also pioneered the trade of dry pea products from the Palouse to Japan. With an original assessed value of $50,196, the building appraised at a value three times that when Ed Dumas sold it along with his company in 1976.

== Building type ==
The Dumas Seed Company warehouse is a Butler Building, constructed on a concrete foundation and floor with rigid-frame steel walls and roof. The Butler Manufacturing Company began building structures for the agricultural industry in 1907 when it introduced the galvanized steel grain bin, opening its Galesburg, Illinois facility in 1939 to meet government demand for the storage bins during the New Deal. After considerable success with grain bin production, the company branched out into pre-engineered buildings in 1939. Although not a new concept, engineers had previously considered the application of a pre-engineered rigid frame to prefabricated buildings as not feasible due to the complicated stress calculations required. Two engineers working for the Butler Company found a way to make it work and consequently contributed by producing a pre-fabricated, pre-engineered building that assembled easily, requiring less steel and labor than previous pre-engineered buildings. Steelworkers in Butler's Galesburg facility began manufacturing steel buildings after WWII. The company manufactured the components at the factory, and then shipped them via railroad to building sites where a concrete slab served as a foundation for the on-site assemblage of the building. The Butler Manufacturing Company continues to manufacture steel pre-engineered buildings today, including other factories and pre-engineered football practice facilities, warehouses, churches, offices, and airplane hangars.

== Building design ==
The large-scale, prefabricated steel Dumas warehouse, with its lack of ornamentation and clean simple lines, reflects a modernist architectural aesthetic. Architectural historians link modernist architecture to ideas of industrial production and works of a purpose-built nature expressing the "potential of the machine to deliver a product with precision and economy." The Dumas Seed Company warehouse exemplifies these attributes, and along with a build date in the early 1960s, it falls easily into the modernist category. While some may consider it an exaggeration to attribute architectural aesthetics to a warehouse, examples of earlier seed warehouses show that it was common to construct them in keeping with the architectural aesthetic of the time. For example, the B.B. Kirkland Seed and Distributing Company warehouse, built in 1916 with its tripartite exterior and frieze, common to many nineteenth and early turn-of the twentieth-century renaissance revival styles, reveals a different aesthetic than the Dumas warehouse. The lack of ornamentation and simplification of form emulated in the Dumas warehouse, often indicative of modern architecture, compares starkly with the Kirkland warehouse.

== Significance ==
The Dumas Seed Company warehouse, given its age, is eligible for consideration for placement on the National Register of Historic Places. While this is a commonly accepted criterion for placement on the register, preservationists must also determine the building's historical and/or aesthetic significance. As a recent-past structure not designed by an architect, therefore without architectural pedigree, the Dumas warehouse challenges the notion of what preservationists consider historically and/or aesthetically significant. Consideration of the building's historic significance requires what preservationist David Fixler suggests is a rethinking of "traditional notions of architectural conservation" concerning modern buildings. For example, the natural weathering of the steel roof requires a value placed on what John Ruskin calls the "golden stain of time." While most preservationists value the patina of a copper roof, the concept must extend to an industrial steel roof in this case. As Fixler suggests, this requires an appreciation for a different reason than aesthetic qualities. The building's patina reveals the passage of time as a point of historical significance, rather than aesthetic beauty.

The National Preservation Act of 1966 (Public Law 89-665) broadened the definition of historical significance beyond national significance to include structures that had meaning for local history, whether or not they were aesthetically pleasing or architecturally significant, in order to consider historic cultural significance. Title I of the legislation directed the secretary of the interior to create the National Register of Historic Places to include "sites, buildings, objects, districts, and structures significant in American history, architecture, archaeology, and culture" in the list of sites and properties of the past worth keeping. Suggesting that preservationists concern themselves with the total heritage of the nation, the law gave credence to preserving a building such as the Dumas Seed Company warehouse because of its broader significance as a cultural venue and an expression of vernacular architecture.

With a broader definition of historical significance than previously considered by preservationists, recent-past preservationists tend to emphasize socio-cultural contexts rather than the previous criteria of age, aesthetics and pedigree. Part of the "original neighborhood district" of Pullman, the Dumas Seed Company warehouse makes connections to the town's roots as a farming community. It celebrates the city's origins in agriculture, the significance the railroad played in its development, and can serve to celebrate the story of the working class. Dumas himself started as a field man, then worked his way up to become owner and president of the company. Preserving the story of agriculture on the Palouse is an important part of Pullman's everyday past.
