= Art Lown =

American singer-songwriter (1949–1977)

- Born: Ardis Leon Lown Jr. 21 December 1949; West Columbia, South Carolina, US
- Died: 8 February 1977 (aged 27) Columbia, South Carolina, US
- Genres: Folk rock, soft rock, country pop, psychedelic pop
- Occupations: Singer-songwriter, musician, producer
- Instruments: Vocals, piano, guitar
- Years active: 1965-1977
- Labels: United Music World, Anthology Recordings

Ardis Leon "Art" Lown Jr. (December 21, 1949 – February 8, 1977) was an American singer-songwriter and musician. He is best known for his sole studio album, Piper Oz the Hound (1976), a privately pressed folk-rock record that later achieved cult status among collectors and fans of obscure 1970s American music.

== Early life ==
Ardis Leon Lown Jr. was born on December 21, 1949, and raised in West Columbia, South Carolina. His family operated local businesses in the area, including grocery stores and a small shopping center known as Lown Town. Lown attended Airport High School, where he was an honor student and served as drum major during his final two years.

After graduating from high school, Lown enrolled at Virginia Commonwealth University, where he studied commercial art. During his teenage years, he began writing songs and performing music, forming an early band with his younger brother, a cousin, and a close friend. By the early 1970s, he was performing locally in the Columbia, South Carolina area.

== Music career ==
While still performing locally in venues around Columbia, South Carolina, Art Lown combined his interest in songwriting with work at United Music World, a small recording studio and label in West Columbia. Through this connection, Lown gained access to professional session players and studio equipment.

In 1976, Lown recorded his only known full-length album, Piper Oz the Hound, at United Music World Recording Studio. The sessions were overseen by studio engineer and producer O.L. Atwood after a shift in the studio's personnel earlier that year. The musicians backing Lown were seasoned session players associated with the studio, including bassist Tony Smith, drummer Donnie Miller, steel guitarist Luke Watts, and lead guitarist Jerry Dooley, who had all previously played together. Lown himself contributed piano and rhythm guitar to the recordings.

The album's sound blends elements of country, pop, and psych-inflected pop while focusing on original material written by Lown. Production was modest and the record was issued as a small private pressing, limiting its initial distribution and commercial exposure. Lown was credited as both writer and co-producer of the album alongside Atwood.

== Death ==
Lown died on February 8, 1977, at the age of 27, only months after the release of Piper Oz the Hound. Contemporary reporting and later research indicate that his death resulted from a single gunshot wound to the head. No widely available public records conclusively established whether the incident was accidental or self-inflicted, and details surrounding his death remain limited. Lown died in Richland Memorial Hospital in Columbia, South Carolina.

== Personal life ==
Lown regularly attended St. David's Lutheran Church in South Carolina.

== Legacy ==
Following his death, Lown's music fell into obscurity for several decades. In the 21st century, Piper Oz the Hound was rediscovered by collectors and reissued, introducing his work to new audiences. The album is frequently cited in discussions of "lost" or "private press" folk records and is praised for its songwriting, atmosphere, and emotional restraint.

Tracks from Piper Oz the Hound have appeared in archival and compilation projects. Notably, Lown was featured on the 2019 various-artists compilation Sad About the Times, curated by Anthology Recordings and Mexican Summer. The compilation highlighted obscure 1970s North American recordings that had largely been overlooked at the time of their release. Lown's track "Deep Blue Sea" was included, and the project served as a springboard for the 2019 reissue of Piper Oz the Hound alongside other obscure albums, bringing his work to new audiences.

== Discography ==
=== Studio albums ===
- Piper Oz the Hound (1976)
