= Air South =

Air South may refer to one of the following companies:

- Air South (Georgia), a former US airline (1969-1978)
- Air South (Alabama), a former US airline (1981-1982)
- Air South (Florida), a former US airline (1986-1987)
- Air South (Australia), an Australian airline (since 1990)
- Air South (South Carolina), a US airline from 1994 to 1997
