= Dakota Dozier =

American football player (born 1991)

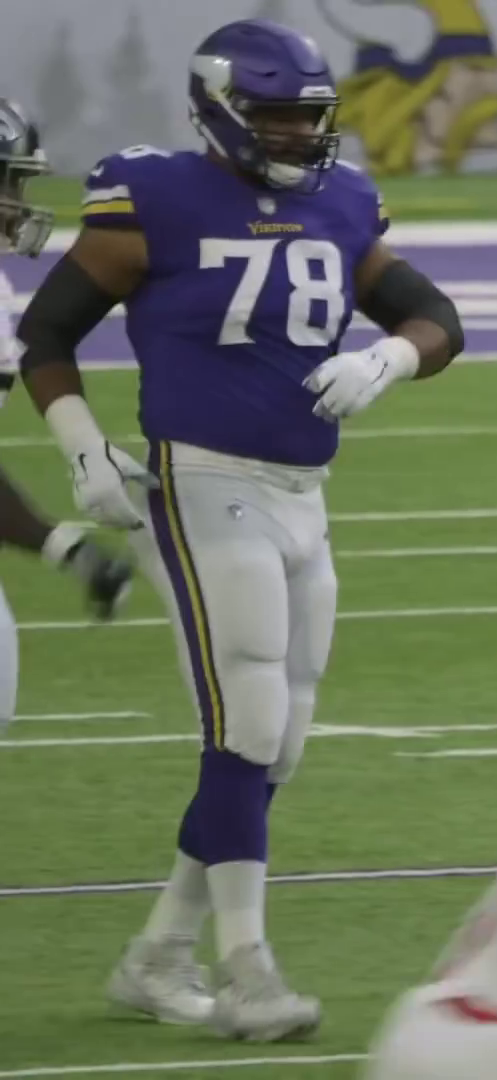
- Dozier with the Minnesota Vikings in 2020

No. 70, 78
- Position: Guard

Personal information
- Born: April 30, 1991 (age 35); West Columbia, South Carolina, U.S.
- Listed height: 6 ft 4 in (1.93 m)
- Listed weight: 312 lb (142 kg)

Career information
- High school: Brookland-Cayce (Cayce, South Carolina)
- College: Furman (2009–2013)
- NFL draft: 2014: 4th round, 137th overall pick

Career history
- New York Jets (2014–2018); Minnesota Vikings (2019–2021); Chicago Bears (2022)

Awards and highlights
- Unanimous FCS All-American (2013); Third-team FCS All-American (2012); First-team All-SoCon (2012, 2013); Second-team All-SoCon (2011); SoCon All-Freshman Team (2010)

Career NFL statistics
- Games played: 76
- Games started: 27
- Stats at Pro Football Reference

Dakota Duran Dozier (born April 30, 1991) is an American former professional football player who was a guard in the National Football League (NFL). He was selected by the New York Jets in the fourth round of the 2014 NFL draft. He played college football for the Furman Paladins, earning unanimous All-American honors.

== Early life ==
Dozier attended Brookland-Cayce High School in Cayce, South Carolina, where he played offensive tackle, defensive tackle, and defensive end. He earned all-region, all-area, and all-state honors, while serving as captain and was named team MVP. He also won a region individual wrestling championship in his senior year.

He was an unranked recruit by Rivals.com.

== College career ==
Dozier attended Furman University, where he was a member of the Furman Paladins football team from 2009 to 2013. During his career, he started 44 games, all at left tackle, and was named an All-Southern Conference (SoCon) selection for three consecutive seasons (second-team in 2011, first-team in 2012 and 2013). He was twice named an FCS All-American by the Associated Press, including being named a unanimous All-American in 2013, making him only the seventh unanimous All-American in school history.

== Professional career ==
Pre-draft measurables
| Height | Weight | Arm length | Hand span | 40-yard dash | 20-yard shuttle | Three-cone drill | Vertical jump | Broad jump | Bench press |
|---|---|---|---|---|---|---|---|---|---|
| 6 ft 3 5/8 in (1.92 m) | 313 lb (142 kg) | 33 7/8 in (0.86 m) | 9 7/8 in (0.25 m) | 5.42 s | 4.89 s | 8.14 s | 24.0 in (0.61 m) | 8 ft 5 in (2.57 m) | 23 reps |
All values from NFL Combine

=== New York Jets ===
Dozier was selected by the New York Jets in the fourth round (137th overall) of the 2014 NFL draft.

In 2017, Dozier played in 14 games, starting three at right guard in place of the injured Brian Winters.

On April 6, 2018, Dozier re-signed with the Jets.

=== Minnesota Vikings ===
On April 4, 2019, Dozier signed with the Minnesota Vikings, being reunited with his 2018 position coach with the Jets, Rick Dennison.

On March 30, 2020, Dozier re-signed with the Vikings. He started all 16 games at left guard for the Vikings in 2020.

On March 30, 2021, Dozier re-signed with the Vikings. He was released on August 31, 2021, and re-signed to the practice squad the next day. He was promoted to the active roster on December 21.

=== Chicago Bears ===
On March 23, 2022, Dozier signed a one-year deal with the Chicago Bears. On June 21, 2022, Dozier was placed on injured reserve a week after suffering an apparent left leg injury during a minicamp practice.
