= Mount Hebron Temperance Hall =

- U.S. National Register of Historic Places
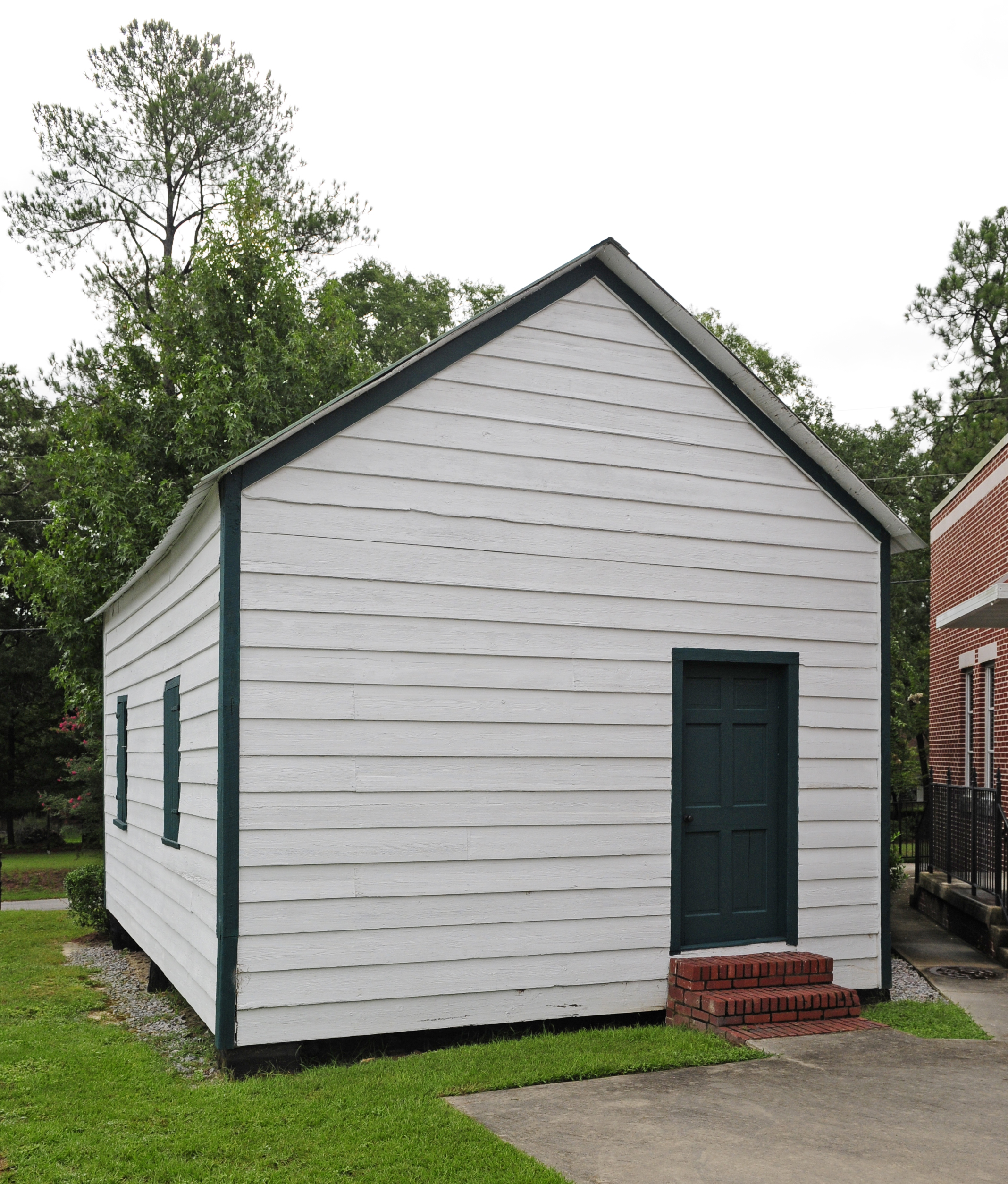
- Mount Hebron Temperance Hall, August 2012

- Location within South Carolina Location within the United States
- Location: 3041 Leaphart Rd., West Columbia, South Carolina
- Coordinates: 33°59′58″N 81°7′29″W
- Area: 0.1 acres (0.040 ha)
- Built: 1862
- NRHP reference No.: 80003677
- Added to NRHP: November 24, 1980

Mount Hebron Temperance Hall, also known as Division Room of the Saludavill Division No. 47, Sons of Temperance and Division Room of the Mt. Hebron Division No. 7, Sons of Temperance, is a historic temperance hall located at West Columbia, Lexington County, South Carolina. It was built in 1862, and is a small, one-story rectangular frame building. It is sheathed in weatherboard and has a gable roof. The building originally housed local chapters of the Sons of Temperance. It was restored in 1979, and is located in the churchyard of the Mount Hebron United Methodist Church. The church uses it as a Sunday School building and Boy Scout Hut.

It was listed on the National Register of Historic Places in 1980.
