= B.B. Kirkland Seed and Distributing Company warehouse =

- B.B. Kirkland Seed and Distributing Company
- U.S. National Register of Historic Places
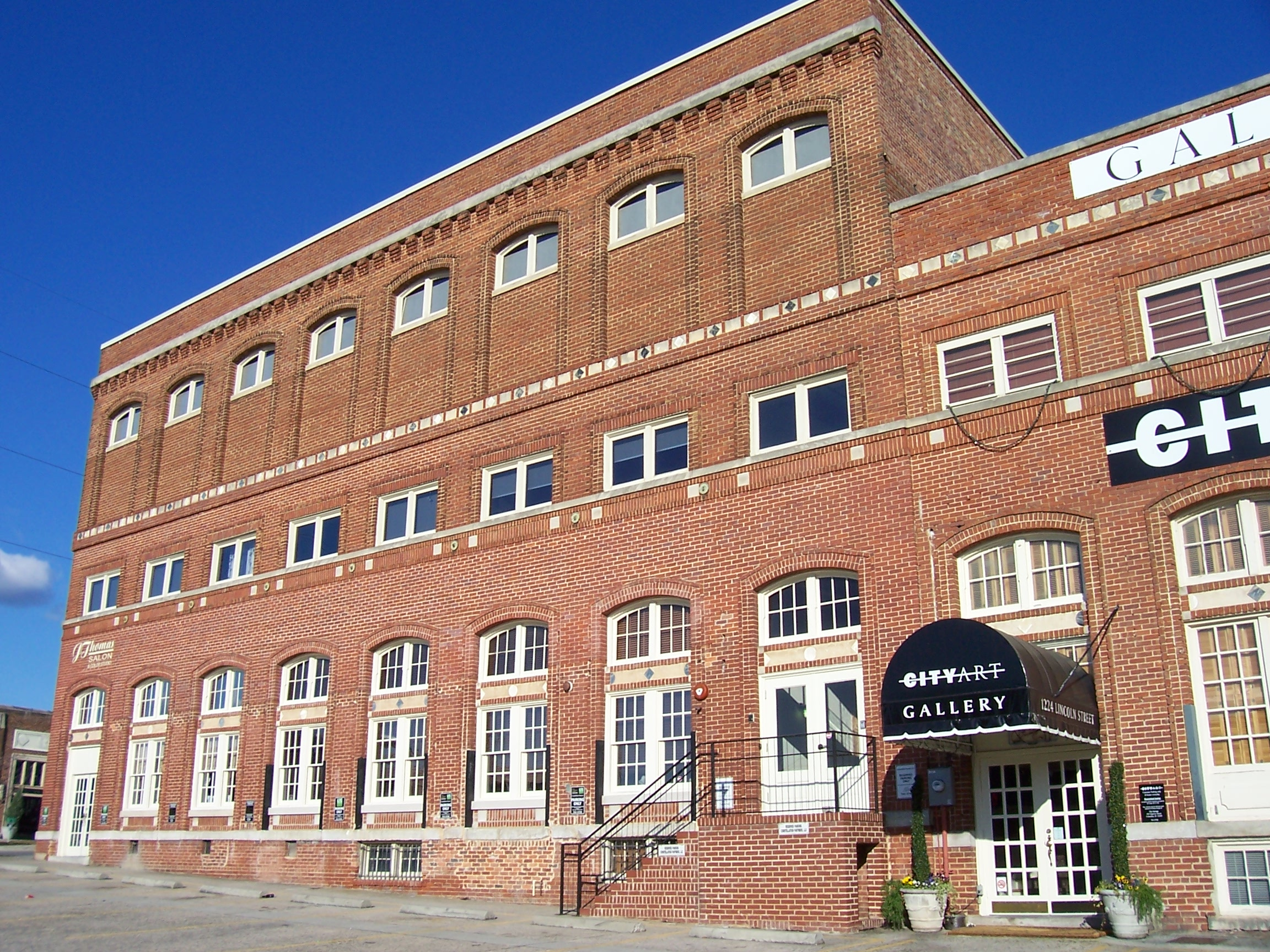
- West elevation of 912 Lady St
- Location: 912 Lady St, Columbia, South Carolina
- Coordinates: 34°0′3.6″N 81°2′18.6″W
- Area: 0.14 acres (570 m^{2})
- Built: 1916
- Architectural style: Early Commercial
- MPS: Columbia MRA
- NRHP reference No.: 79003370
- Added to NRHP: 2 March 1979

The B.B. Kirkland Seed and Distributing Company is a three-story historic warehouse building at 912 Lady Street in Columbia, South Carolina. It was listed on the National Register of Historic Places in 1979.

== History ==
Benjamin Brown Kirkland, a prominent local businessman, started the Kirkland Distributing Company in 1900 and incorporated it in 1908. He built his warehouse in 1916 on the site that farmers had used as a campground when visiting Columbia to sell their products on nearby Assembly Street. They chose the campsite because of three natural springs there, and one spring still flows in the basement of the building today. The exterior of the building is made of brick, with inset marble decorations and arched windows. Each of the three floors of the building is 70 feet (21 m) by 80 feet (24 m), with 15 feet (4.6 m) ceilings. The natural spring rises in the northwest corner of the full basement and promptly runs down a drain.

Kirkland sold a variety of products, including flour, grain and hay. In 1918, Kirkland Distributing lost a case in appellate court to the Aunt Jemima Mills Company. Kirkland's trademark of an African-American boy holding a watermelon under his chin was ruled to infringe upon the trademarked image of Aunt Jemima with her red and black shawl tied beneath her neck.

In 1966 the building became the home of the Hinson Feed and Seed Company. Hinson closed his business in 1995. By the 1990s the district of old warehouses and textile mills abutting Gervais Street was recast as the Congaree Vista, and trendy businesses, bars and restaurants began to move into renovated buildings. Presently the B.B. Kirkland Seed and Distributing Company building houses a number of businesses, most notably American Specialty Health, Inc. and the City Art Gallery.
