= Ike Okoli =

American amateur wrestler (born 1988)

Personal information
- Born: March 23, 1988 (age 38) Columbia, South Carolina, U.S.
- Height: 6 ft 0 in (1.83 m)

Sport
- Sport: Wrestling
- Event: Beach wrestling
- College team: University of South Carolina
Medal record
Men's Beach wrestling
Representing the United States
World Championships
Bronze medal – third place	2014 Katerini	+90 kg
Pan American Championships
Gold medal – first place	2015 Cartagena de Indias	+90kg
National Championships
Gold medal – first place	2013 Carolina Beach	+90kg
Gold medal – first place	2014 Carolina Beach	+90kg
Gold medal – first place	2015 Carolina Beach	+90kg
Silver medal – second place	2016 Carolina Beach	+90kg
Silver medal – second place	2017 Carolina Beach	+90kg

Ike Okoli (born March 23, 1988) from Cayce, South Carolina is a beach wrestler who is a 3x U.S. Beach Wrestling Nationals/ World Team Trials champion at +90 kg. Winning in 2013 2014 and 2015 At the 2014 FILA (now known as the UWW or United World Wrestling) Beach World Championships in Katerini, Greece where he earn the bronze medal as a member of the USA World Beach Team with a record of 4 - 1. Okoli was the only world beach medalist of the U.S. delegation in 2014 after suffering travel delays due to inclement weather.

In 2015, Okoli won gold in the first UWW Pan American Beach Wrestling Championship, where he beat an opponent from Colombia in a best-of three series. Okoli won in two straight matches by 3-0 margins, he was the only U.S. athlete entered in the competition, which featured athletes from Canada, Colombia, Brazil, Venezuela and the United States. Okoli is of Nigerian descent.

Okoli wrestled at Brookland-Cayce High School in Cayce, South Carolina. He later became a 2x NCWA All American for the University of South Carolina. In 2013, Okoli help South Carolina to a 2nd-place finish behind the Massachusetts Institute of Technology in the NCWA Division II National Team Standings

Prior to South Carolina, Okoli played football for Mount Union University for one season.
