= New Brookland Historic District =

Historic district in South Carolina, United States

- U.S. National Register of Historic Places
- U.S. Historic district
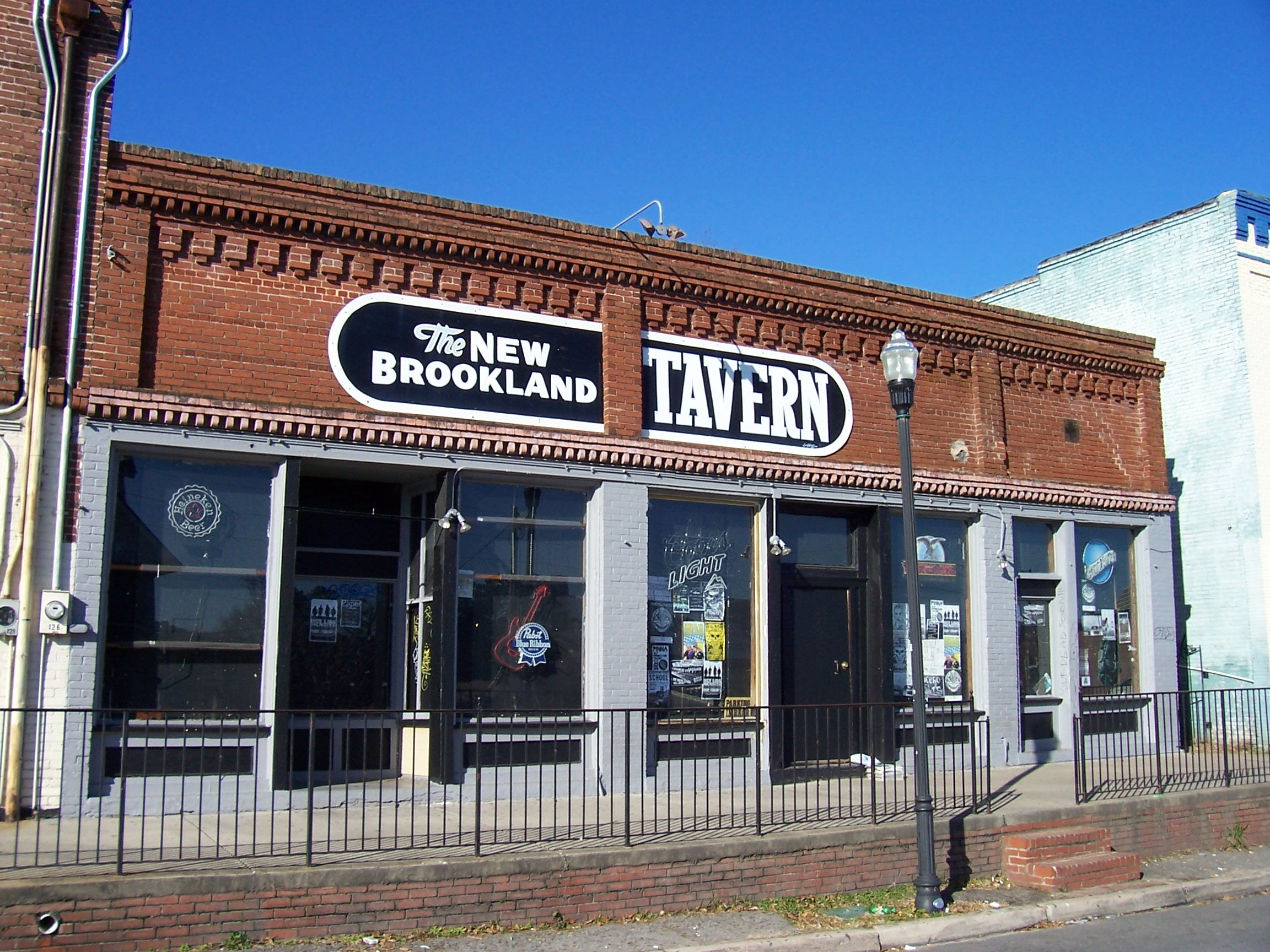
- New Brookland Tavern, New Brookland Historic District, January 2010

- Location within South Carolina Location within the United States
- Location: Roughly bounded by Alexander Rd., Augusta, State, Spring, and Meeting Sts., West Columbia, South Carolina
- Coordinates: 33°59′34″N 81°3′17″W
- Area: 34 acres (14 ha)
- Built by: Columbia Mills Co.
- Architectural style: Gothic Revival
- NRHP reference No.: 78002524
- Added to NRHP: October 10, 1978

New Brookland Historic District is a national historic district located at West Columbia, Lexington County, South Carolina. It encompasses 23 contributing buildings in the central business district and the "mill village" sections of West Columbia. It includes commercial, institutional, and residential buildings built between 1894 and 1916 as a planned residential community for the Columbia Duck Mill. Notable buildings include the Edward W. Shull Building, Thompson Funeral Home, Brookland Fire Station, Brookland Jail, and single and double tenant houses.

It was listed on the National Register of Historic Places in 1978.
