= Airport High School (South Carolina) =

Public high school in West Colombia, South Carolina, United States

Location
- 1315 Boston Avenue; West Columbia, South Carolina, 29170; United States; 33°57′0″N 81°6′23″W

Information
- Type: Public high school
- Established: 1958 (68 years ago)
- School district: Lexington County School District Two
- Principal: Matt Schilit
- Teaching staff: 72.00 (FTE)
- Grades: 9–12
- Enrollment: 1,338 (2023–2024)
- Student to teacher ratio: 18.58
- Colors: Blue and gray
- Athletics: Fall: competitive cheer, cross country, football, girls' golf, swimming, girls' tennis, volleyball Winter: girls' basketball, boys' basketball, bowling, wrestling Spring: baseball, boys' golf, girls' soccer, softball, boys' tennis, track
- Mascot: Eagle
- Nickname: The Port, Flight School
- Rival: Brookland-Cayce High School
- Newspaper: The Eyrie
- Yearbook: Aquila
- Affiliation: Columbia Metropolitan Airport (CAE), Midlands Technical College (Airport Campus)
- Website: https://ahs.lex2.org/

Airport High School in West Columbia, South Carolina, United States, is a public high school offering education for grades 9–12. It serves the communities of West Columbia, Cayce, South Congaree, and Pine Ridge, and parts of Gaston. A part of Lexington County School District 2, it derives its name from its location next to (CAE) Columbia Metropolitan Airport. Sports teams are known as the Eagles. The main athletic rival is the Brookland-Cayce High School Bearcats.

== Structure ==
Airport HS has a student body of around 1,400. It has a student: teacher ratio of 31:1 in core subjects. The current principal is Matt Schilit, alongside assistant principals Julie Miller, Cheryl Talton, and Chris Pumphrey.

Class breakdown is as follows:

9th – 566
10th – 484
11th – 441
12th – 454

== Feeder schools ==
Elementary and middle schools that feed into Airport High School are Congaree Elementary School, Springdale Elementary School, Herbert A. Wood Elementary School, R.H. Fulmer Middle School, and Pine Ridge Middle School.

== JROTC Drill Team ==
Airport's Golden Talon Drill Team consistently finishes as the top drill team in South Carolina, and in the top 10 in the nation.

== Notable alumni ==
- Larry Francis Lebby - painter and printmaker (1950–2019)
- Art Lown - singer-songwriter (1949–1977)
- Duce Staley - former NFL player (Super Bowl Champion: XL as a player and LII as a coach); current assistant head coach for the Detroit Lions
- Jim Stuckey - former NFL football player, member of the Super Bowl XVI and XIX Champion San Francisco 49ers
