= Columbia Metropolitan Airport =

Airport in South Carolina, United States

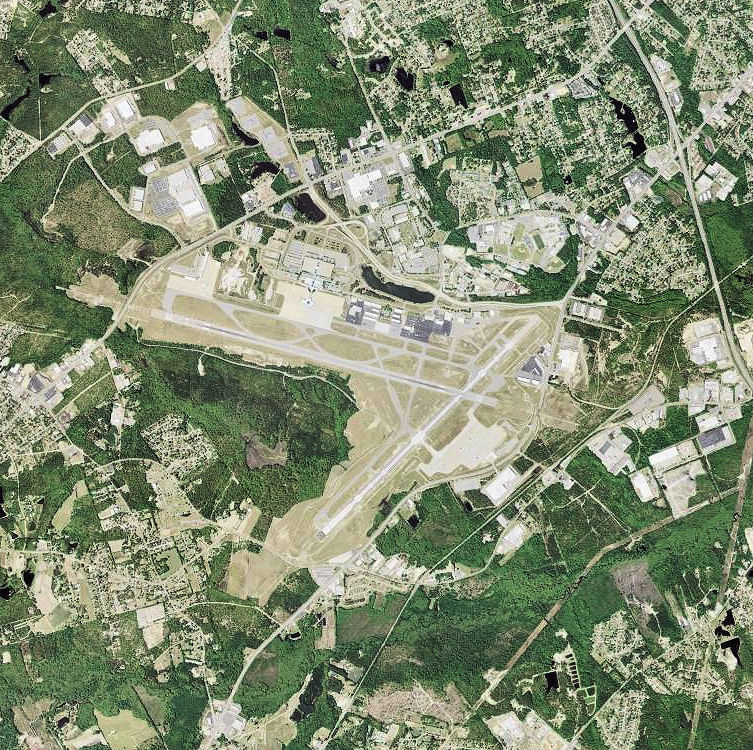
- IATA: CAE; ICAO: KCAE; FAA LID: CAE

Summary
- Airport type: Public
- Owner/Operator: Richland-Lexington Airport District
- Serves: Columbia, South Carolina, U.S.
- Location: West Columbia, South Carolina, U.S.
- Hub for: UPS Airlines
- Built: 1940
- Elevation AMSL: 236 ft (72 m)
- Coordinates: 33°56′20″N 081°07′10″W
- Website: flycae.com

Map
- Interactive map of Columbia Metropolitan Airport

Runways
Direction	Length		Surface
Direction	ft	m	Surface
5/23	8,001	2,439	Asphalt/concrete
11/29	8,601	2,622	Asphalt

Helipads
Number	Length		Surface
Number	ft	m	Surface
H1	50	15	Concrete

Statistics (2025)
- Commercial passengers: 1,370,479 ▲0.6%
- Enplaned passengers: 675,081
- Freight/mail (lb.): 79,232,000
- Source: Federal Aviation Administration

Columbia Metropolitan Airport (IATA: CAE, ICAO: KCAE, FAA LID: CAE) is the main commercial airport for Columbia and the Midlands region of South Carolina, United States. The airport is located in unincorporated Lexington County, southwest of Columbia. Although it has a West Columbia mailing address, the airport is not within that city's boundaries. The city of Cayce and the towns of Springdale, Pine Ridge, and South Congaree surround the airport, separating the airport from West Columbia. The airport is a regional cargo hub for UPS Airlines.

== History ==
=== World War II era ===
The airport was built in 1940 as Lexington County Airport. In 1940, the United States Army Air Corps indicated a need for the airfield as part of the buildup of its forces after World War II began in Europe. The earliest recorded Air Corps use of the airport was when the 105th Observation Squadron began flying Douglas O-38 and North American O-47 light observation aircraft on September 24, 1940.

In 1941, the airport came under formal military control, and an immediate program began to turn the civil airport into a military airfield. On 8 December 1941, as the Columbia Army Air Base, Columbia Army Airfield's mission was a training base for North American B-25 Mitchell crews.

One of the earliest units to train at Columbia AAB was the 17th Bombardment Group, which arrived on 9 February 1942. When the group arrived in Columbia, its combat crews were offered the opportunity to volunteer for an "extremely hazardous" but unspecified mission which ultimately turned out to be the famous Doolittle Raid on Japan. Contrary to popular belief, the volunteers who made up the crews of the Doolittle Raid did not train for the raid itself at Columbia.

Training at Columbia Army Air Base was phased down during the summer of 1945. Several units arrived at the base from overseas to inactivate during September and October. It was inactivated by the U.S. Army Air Forces on 30 November and returned to civil authorities, who converted it back to an airport. The 350th Bombardment Squadron was assigned to Columbia Metropolitan Airport on 16 July 1947 as part of the Air Force Reserve, but it was never equipped or staffed; it was inactivated on 27 June 1949.

=== Postwar use ===
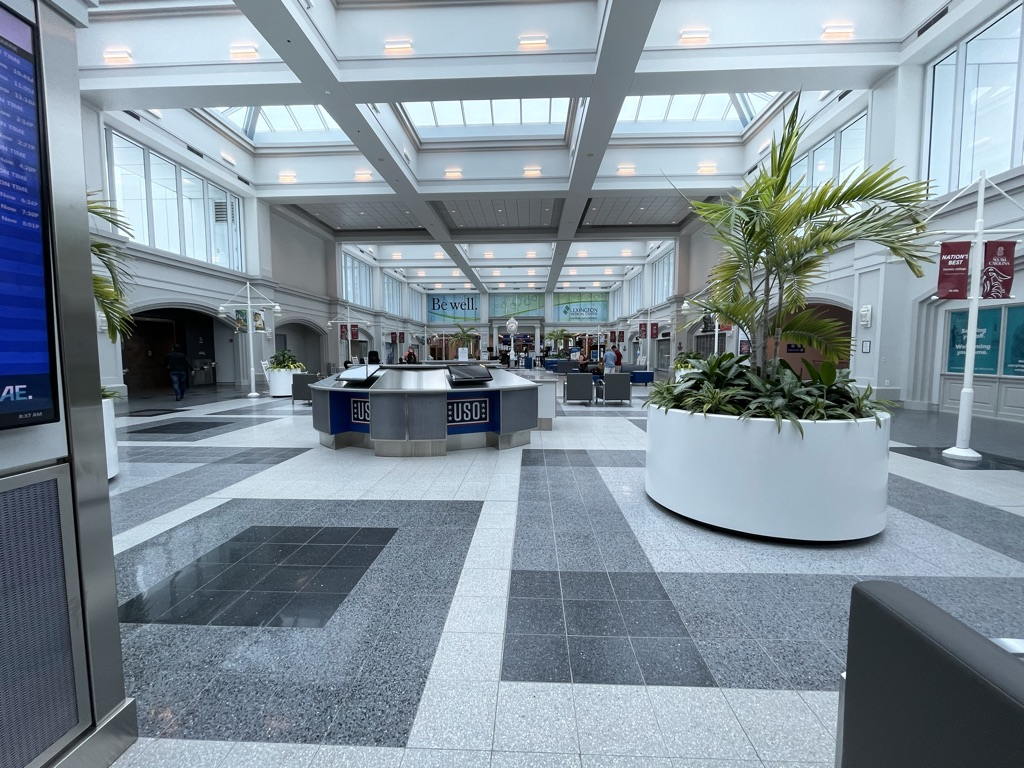
Inside the airport looking toward TSA security

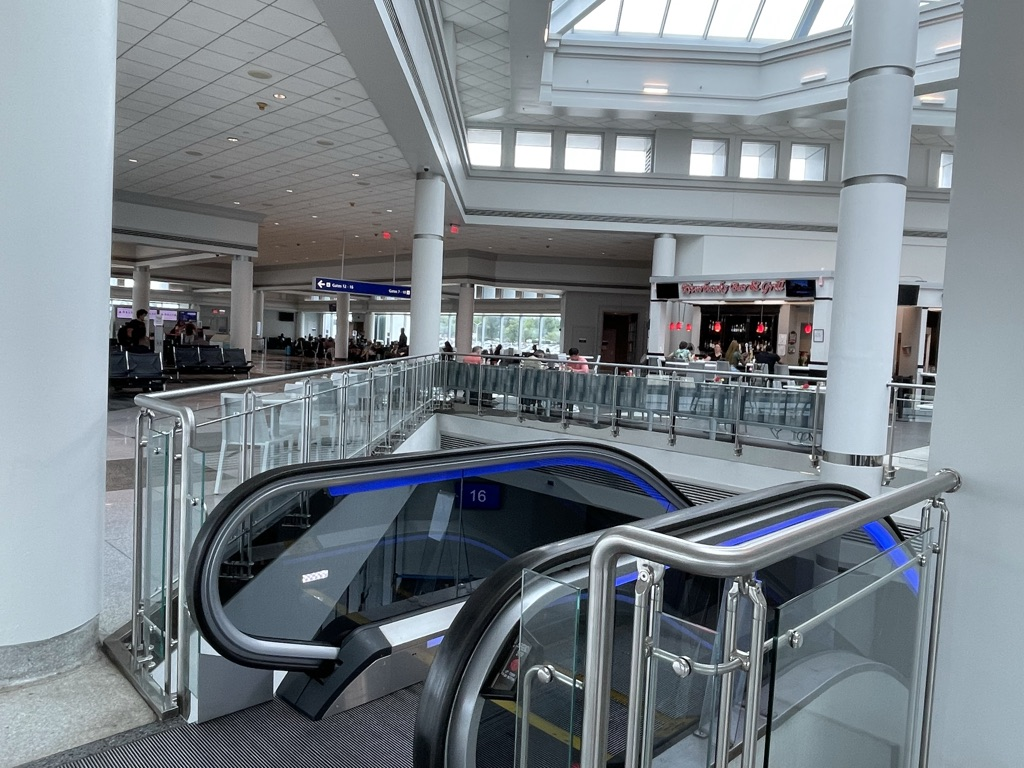
Inside the airport beyond TSA security

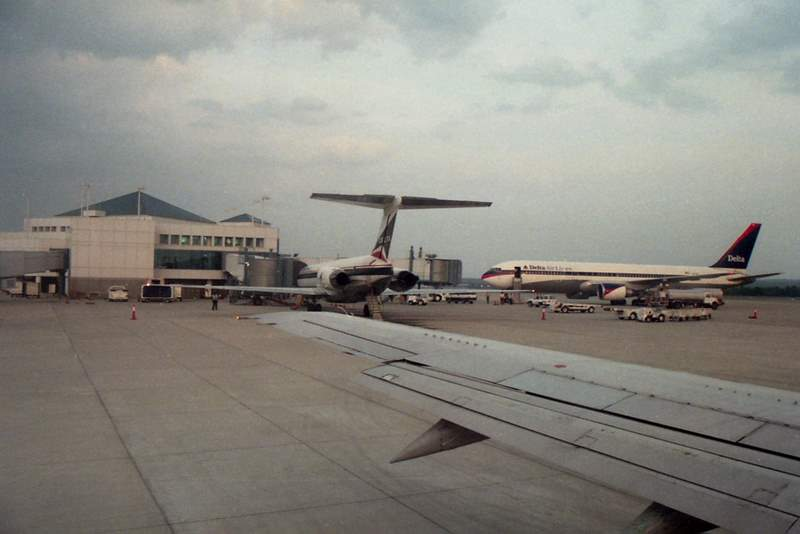
Columbia Metropolitan Airport in 1998

Before World War II, Columbia's main civil airport had been Owens Field. However, its location near downtown made expansion impossible. Accordingly, in 1947, most of the area's frontline passenger service relocated to Lexington County Airport, which was renamed Columbia Metropolitan Airport. The city of Columbia built a new terminal at the airport in the early 1950s. It burned down, and a new one was built in its place.

In 1962, the Richland-Lexington Airport District was established to operate the airport. It is governed by a 12-member commission–five nominated by Lexington County's legislative delegation, five nominated by Richland County's legislative delegation, and two nominated by the Columbia city council.

Passenger service began on Delta Air Lines which has served Columbia for over 70 years. Delta began flights from Columbia to Charleston, Asheville, Jacksonville, Augusta, Savannah and New York–La Guardia. Delta DC-9 jet flights began March 7, 1966, with Flight 521 from Charleston continuing to Atlanta.

Eastern Airlines flew to Charlotte, Washington, and New York; it first scheduled jets to CAE in 1965. Piedmont Airlines flew from Augusta, Florence, and Charlotte in 1962. Southern Airways flew to Charleston and Greenville/Spartanburg. In January 1978, Eastern started flights to Atlanta after a route swap with Piedmont Airlines. Southern Airways left in December 1978, six months before their merger with North Central Airlines to form Republic Airlines. Atlantis Airlines started service in 1979 for a brief time using Twin Otter aircraft. Piedmont Airlines introduced nonstop service to Miami in January 1980, but dropped Columbia in June 1980 leaving only Delta and Eastern for a time.

In November 1982, Piedmont Airlines returned to Columbia with flights to Charlotte and later Newark. American Airlines would start service in 1985 to Raleigh and United Airlines would fly to Charlotte and Chicago–O'Hare. PeopleExpress and Continental Airlines. Freedom Airlines operated Convairs to Columbia in 1983. United Express (operated by Atlantic Coast Airlines) entered the market May 24, 1999, with service to Washington–Dulles and added Chicago–O'Hare on July 1, 2000. Northwest Airlines (operated by Pinnacle Airlines) came to Columbia on October 6, 2003, offering service to Detroit. On October 30, 2005, American Eagle returned after a nine-year absence with service to Dallas/Fort Worth after Delta closed their DFW hub earlier that year. In October 2010, US Airways Express operated by Air Wisconsin began non-stops to New York–La Guardia, but wound up discontinuing it as a result of a New York–La Guardia slot swap with Delta, which now has two daily flights to the airport.

Since 2000, the airport has tried to recruit low-cost carriers, but has been unable to maintain those services. Allegiant Air tried service to Orlando/Sanford, St. Petersburg/Clearwater and Fort Lauderdale in Florida, yet these services did not last. Allegiant Air resumed these services in summer 2025. Independence Air served Columbia briefly in 2004 and 2005 with service to Washington–Dulles before ceasing its operations in January 2006. In May 2008, Spirit Airlines began service to Fort Lauderdale but terminated the route in March 2009. Spirit Airlines resumed flights to Fort Lauderdale in June 2025 but only to end in October 2025. In 2011, Vision Airlines launched service to Destin, Florida, ending the route after a month.

In 2015, United Airlines CEO Jeff Smisek was forced to step down after it was revealed that he had continued to run an unprofitable route to the airport from Newark Liberty International Airport for former Port Authority of New York and New Jersey chairman David Samson. The airline has since resumed the route to Newark Liberty International Airport in January 2026.

On June 7, 2018, American Airlines restored mainline service to Columbia with two daily nonstop flights to Dallas/Fort Worth. The airline also announced it would start flights to/from Miami by the end of 2019.

== Facilities ==
The airport covers 2,600 acres (1,100 ha) and has two runways: 11/29 is 8,601 ft × 150 ft (2,622 m × 46 m) and 5/23 is 8,001 ft × 150 ft (2,439 m × 46 m). It has a 50 ft × 50 ft (15 m × 15 m) helipad. The center 75 ft (23 m) of runway 5/23 is asphalt; the edges are grooved concrete.

The airport is a hub for UPS Airlines and was a hub for Air South, a former low-cost carrier.

The terminal opened May 30, 1965, and was renovated in 1997. The renovation was designed by Heyward, Woodrum, Fant & Associates, Ltd. It replaces a terminal built in the early 1950s which was a replacement of a terminal built several years earlier in the early 1950s. Since the late 1980s, capital improvements have been undertaken, including a renovated and expanded terminal, a new parking garage (completed in 2003), the lengthening of the runways, and better interstate access. The terminal has several services, including gift shops, the Everett Adams Memorial Chapel, restaurants and bars inside the terminal. Free wireless internet service is provided throughout the airport as well as small number of recharge stations with access to outlets.

Police and fire/rescue services are provided by the Columbia Metro Airport Department of Public Safety. Public safety officers are South Carolina Police Academy Class 1 officers, and South Carolina Fire Academy IFSAC Firefighter II, and Airport Firefighter. Some have basic EMT certifications. The Department has three ARFF units, one RIV unit, one fire pumper, and a service truck. Law enforcement is covered by four patrol vehicles. The Department provides fire services at the FAR 139 level only. Structural firefighting is handled by Lexington County Fire Service.

== Airlines and destinations ==
Passenger service is currently provided by four scheduled airlines, with commercial cargo service being handled by three scheduled airlines and numerous air freight operators. Two fixed-base operators also serve the Metro facility with various charter flights. The airport maintains a newly dedicated air cargo terminal, the Columbia Airport Enterprise Park (CAE Park) and Foreign Trade Zone #127. Columbia Metropolitan Airport recently completed a $45 million terminal expansion and renovation. Annually, the airport serves about 1 million passengers, though prior to the Great Recession, nearly 1.5 million passengers were served.

=== Passenger ===
Airlines	Destinations
American Airlines	Seasonal: Dallas/Fort Worth
American Eagle	Charlotte, Chicago–O'Hare, Dallas/Fort Worth, New York–LaGuardia, Philadelphia, Washington–National; Seasonal: Miami
Delta Air Lines	Atlanta
Delta Connection	Atlanta, New York–LaGuardia
United Express	Chicago–O'Hare, Newark, Washington–Dulles

=== Cargo ===
Airlines	Destinations
Air Cargo Carriers	Myrtle Beach

== Statistics ==
=== Top destinations ===
Busiest domestic routes from CAE (October 2024 – September 2025)
Rank	City	Passengers	Carriers
1	Atlanta, Georgia	231,000	Delta
2	Charlotte, North Carolina	134,550	American
3	Dallas/Fort Worth, Texas	66,150	American
4	New York-LaGuardia, New York	53,390	American, Delta
5	Washington–National, D.C.	53,370	American
6	Chicago–O'Hare, Illinois	40,680	American, United
7	Washington–Dulles, D.C.	39,830	United
8	Philadelphia, Pennsylvania	24,420	American
9	Fort Lauderdale, Florida	7,290	Allegiant, Spirit
10	Newark, New Jersey	4,670	

=== Airline market share ===
Largest airlines serving CAE (October 2024 – September 2025)
Rank	Airline	Passengers	Share
1	Delta Air Lines	351,000	26.25%
2	PSA Airlines	230,000	17.22%
3	Piedmont Airlines	199,000	14.92%
4	Endeavor Air	179,000	13.41%
5	CommuteAir	81,540	6.10%
	Other	295,000	22.10%

=== Annual traffic ===
CAE Airport annual traffic 2004–present
Year	Passengers	Year	Passengers	Year	Passengers
2004	1,247,862	2014	1,034,133	2024	1,362,374
2005	1,462,933	2015	1,102,011	2025	1,370,479
2006	1,289,667	2016	1,132,329	2026	
2007	1,234,547	2017	1,077,188	2027	
2008	1,149,682	2018	1,197,603	2028	
2009	1,051,348	2019	1,353,788	2029	
2010	1,003,375	2020	577,187	2030	
2011	996,158	2021	870,806	2031	
2012	1,014,749	2022	1,063,630	2032	
2013	1,018,226	2023	1,234,487	2033	

== Southeastern regional cargo hub ==
In August 1996, the UPS Airlines-owned cargo airline opened an $80 million southeastern regional hub at the airport, one of six regional hubs throughout the United States. The hub can offer next-day, second-day and third-day air service. The buildings encompass 352,000 square feet (32,700 m^{2}) and the 44-acre (180,000 m^{2}) ramp is large enough to hold 22 DC-8 aircraft. The hub has the ability to process 42,000 packages an hour. Other major air cargo companies serving the airport include ABX Air and FedEx Express.

== Accidents and incidents ==
- A Volpar 18 (registration N47A) crashed on February 26, 1971 while attempting to land at the airport. The aircraft crashed in poor visibility and fog while performing a missed approach, killing the pilot and seven passengers.
- A Beechcraft C90 King Air (N711FC) crashed on December 20, 1973 while attempting to land at the airport. The aircraft collided with trees after descending below minimum descent altitude in poor visibility. The pilot and a passenger were killed and another passenger was seriously injured.
- A Learjet 60 (N999LJ) crashed on September 19, 2008 while attempting a rejected takeoff on runway 11, crashing instead into the hillside across a road beyond the end of the runway. Four people died in the accident, including the two pilots. The sole survivors were musicians Travis Barker of Blink 182 and DJ Adam Goldstein, who died a year later.
- On December 20, 2020, a Western Global Airlines Boeing 747 lost a wingtip on its right wing while taxiing before take-off at Columbia Metropolitan Airport, for a flight to Ontario International Airport in Ontario, California. No one aboard was reported injured.
- On August 12, 2025, a Velocity XL (N7778M) en route from Fort Lauderdale Executive Airport crashed when its front landing gear collapsed upon landing on runway 11, shutting down airport operations for hours. The plane sustained heavy damage but pilot survived with minor injuries.

== See also ==
- List of airports in South Carolina
