= Springdale, Lexington County, South Carolina =

Springdale, South Carolina
- Town
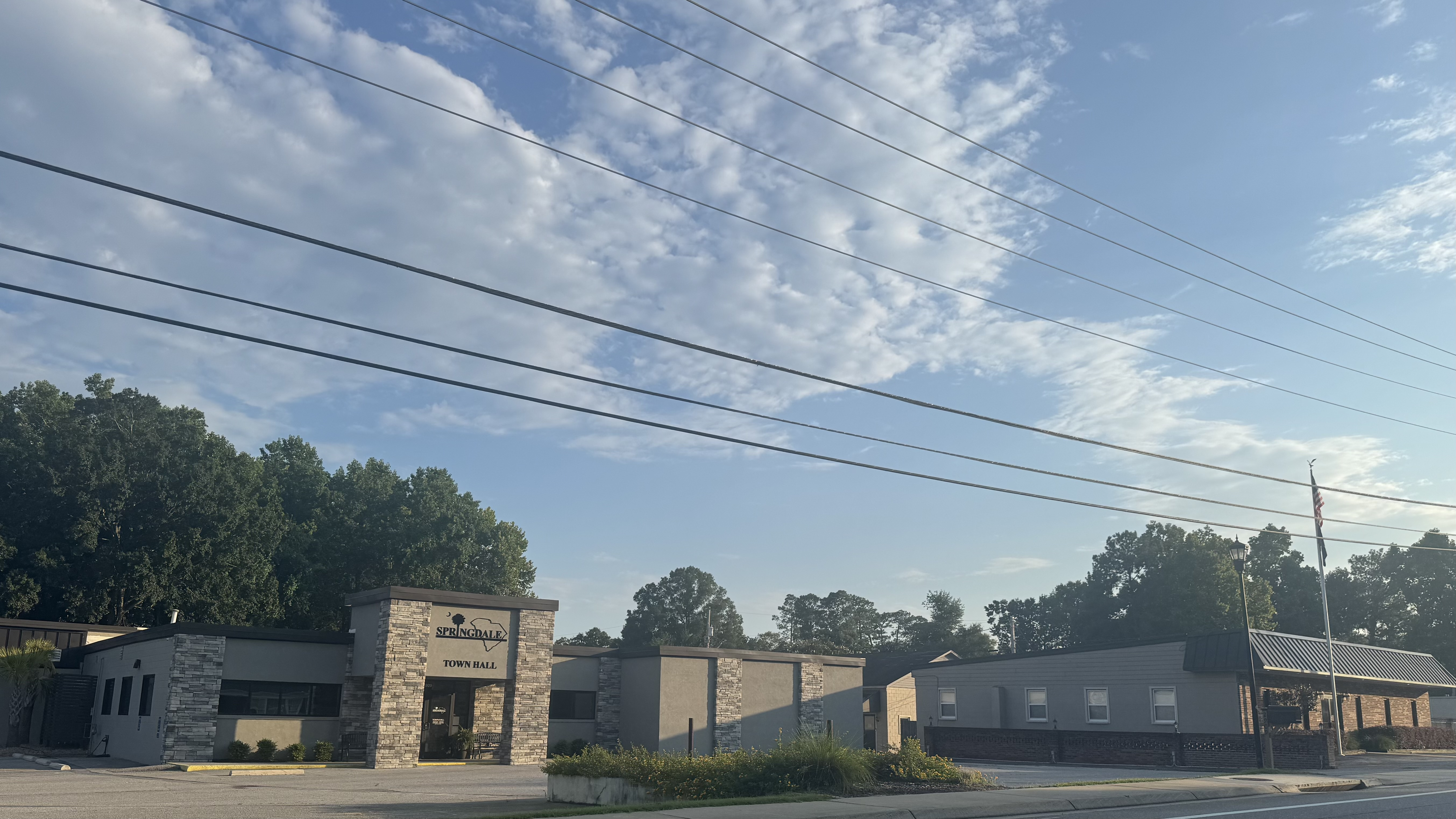
- Springdale Town Hall

- Seal
- Motto: "Small Town. Big Hearts."
- Location in South Carolina Location in the United States
- Coordinates: 33°57′42″N 81°07′14″W
- Country: United States
- State: South Carolina
- County: Lexington

Area
  - Total: 2.73 sq mi (7.08 km^{2})
  - Land: 2.70 sq mi (7.00 km^{2})
  - Water: 0.031 sq mi (0.08 km^{2})
- Elevation: 220 ft (67 m)

Population (2020)
  - Total: 2,744
  - Density: 1,014.8/sq mi (391.81/km^{2})
- Time zone: UTC-5 (Eastern (EST))
  - Summer (DST): UTC-4 (EDT)
- ZIP code: 29170 (West Columbia)
- Area codes: 803, 839
- FIPS code: 45-68425
- GNIS feature ID: 2407387
- Website: www.springdalesc.com

Springdale is a town in Lexington County, South Carolina, United States. The population was 2,744 at the 2020 census. It is part of the Columbia Metropolitan Statistical Area.

== Geography ==
According to the United States Census Bureau, the town has a total area of 2.7 square miles (7.1 km^{2}), of which 2.7 square miles (7.0 km^{2}) is land and 0.03 square mile (0.1 km^{2}) (1.06%) is water. Springdale is located less than a mile northeast of Columbia Metropolitan Airport and is located west of the adjacent cities of Cayce and West Columbia.

== Demographics ==
Historical population
Census	Pop.	Note	%±
1960	1,002		—
1970	2,638		163.3%
1980	2,985		13.2%
1990	3,226		8.1%
2000	2,877		−10.8%
2010	2,636		−8.4%
2020	2,744		4.1%
U.S. Decennial Census

As of the census of 2000, there were 2,877 people, 1,206 households, and 869 families residing in the town. The population density was 718.8 inhabitants per square mile (277.5/km^{2}). There were 1,334 housing units at an average density of 333.3 per square mile (128.7/km^{2}). The racial makeup of the town was 88.91% White, 7.75% African American, 0.66% Native American, 1.67% Asian, 0.24% from other races, and 0.76% from two or more races. Hispanic or Latino of any race were 0.70% of the population.

There were 1,206 households, out of which 26.0% had children under the age of 18 living with them, 58.0% were married couples living together, 10.5% had a female householder with no husband present, and 27.9% were non-families. 22.0% of all households were made up of individuals, and 9.9% had someone living alone who was 65 years of age or older. The average household size was 2.39 and the average family size was 2.77.

In the town, the population was spread out, with 19.8% under the age of 18, 7.7% from 18 to 24, 26.7% from 25 to 44, 26.8% from 45 to 64, and 19.1% who were 65 years of age or older. The median age was 42 years. For every 100 females, there were 91.3 males. For every 100 females age 18 and over, there were 90.6 males.

The median income for a household in the town was $48,456, and the median income for a family was $57,014. Males had a median income of $40,531 versus $26,658 for females. The per capita income for the town was $21,260. About 3.2% of families and 6.1% of the population were below the poverty line, including 5.8% of those under age 18 and 5.7% of those age 65 or over.

== Education ==
Springdale is served by Lexington County School District 2, and is zoned for Springdale Elementary School within the town as well as Fulmer Middle School and Airport High School in West Columbia. The Lexington 2 Performing Arts Center is located within Springdale.

== Notable person ==
- Joe Wilson – incumbent U.S. representative for South Carolina's 2nd congressional district, former South Carolina state senator
