= Lexington County School District Two =

School district in South Carolina, United States

- Lex2 Performing Arts Center in Springdale

Address
- 715 Ninth Street West Columbia, South Carolina, 29169; United States

District information
- Type: Public
- Motto: "Where Children are Champions"
- Grades: PreK–12
- Superintendent: Brenda B. Hafner
- NCES District ID: 4502730

Students and staff
- Students: 8,582
- Teachers: 639.67
- Staff: 561.6
- Student–teacher ratio: 13.42

Other information
- Website: www.lex2.org

Lexington County School District Two or Lexington Two (Lex2) is a school district in Lexington County, South Carolina headquartered in the city of West Columbia. The school district serves most of West Columbia as well as Cayce, Springdale, South Congaree, and Pine Ridge.

== Schools ==
Public schools in Lexington Two (2020-21 data; Fiscal data from 2018–19)
Elementary Schools	Enrollment	Municipality
Cayce Elementary	987	Cayce
Congaree Elementary	406	South Congaree
Riverbank Elementary	1,056	West Columbia
Saluda River Academy for the Arts	267	West Columbia
Springdale Elementary	373	Springdale
Herbert A. Wood Elementary	913	Pine Ridge
Middle Schools	Enrollment	Municipality
Cyril B. Busbee Creative Arts Academy	431	Cayce
R. H. Fulmer Middle School	666	West Columbia
Northside Middle School	595	West Columbia
Pine Ridge Middle School	476	Pine Ridge
High Schools	Enrollment	Municipality
Airport High School	1,337	West Columbia
Brookland-Cayce High School	1,075	Cayce
Alternative Education	Enrollment	Municipality
New Bridge Academy	N/A	Cayce
Community Education Center	N/A	West Columbia
Total Enrollment	8,582	

== Demographics ==
Racial Demographics
Race	%
White	65.6%
African American	22.2%
Hispanic or Latino	7.4%
Asian	1.9%
Two or more races	2.3%
Other	0.7%
