= Air South (South Carolina) =

Low-cost airline of the United States (1994–1997)

IATA	ICAO	Call sign
WV	KKB	KHAKI BLUE
- Founded: 1993
- Commenced operations: July 12, 1994
- Ceased operations: 1997
- Operating bases: Atlanta; Columbia (SC)
- Headquarters: Columbia, South Carolina
- Website: https://web.archive.org/web/19970404033713/http://www.airsouth.com/

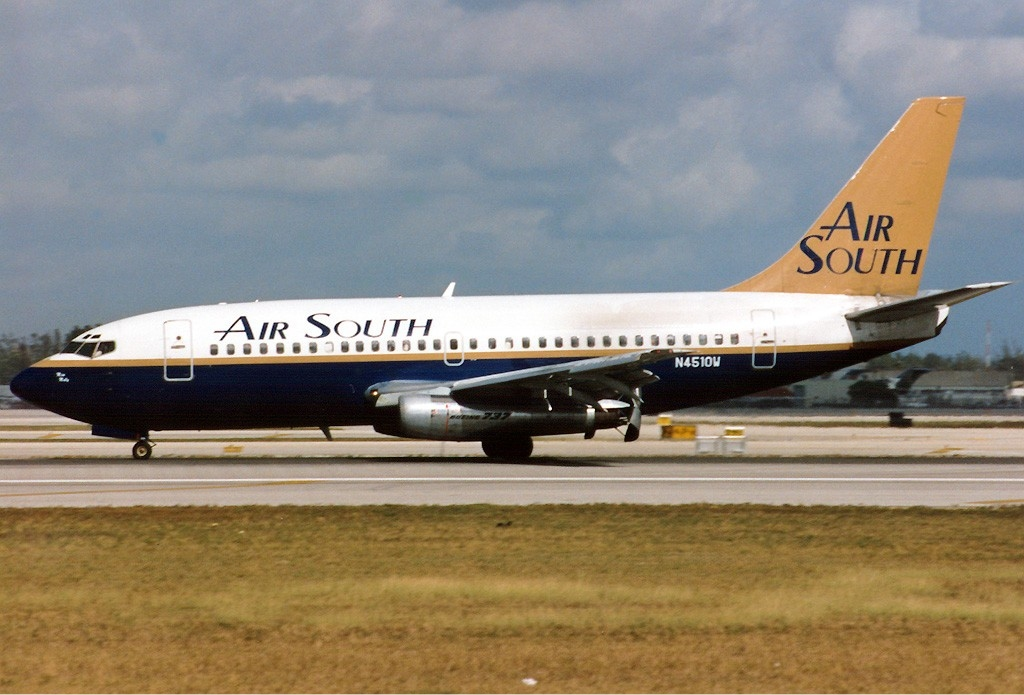
An Air South Boeing 737-200 at Miami International Airport (1996).

Air South was a low-cost airline in the United States, headquartered in Columbia, South Carolina. Between 1994 and 1997, it offered domestic flights mainly serving the southeast of the country. For a time, a partnership with Kiwi International Air Lines was maintained.

== History ==
The company was founded in 1993, though the first aircraft, a used Boeing 737-200, arrived with Air South on 12 July 1994. Over the following months, additional aging 737-200s were added (all of them had been delivered to their original operators between 1968 and 1979), and by 1995, the fleet had grown to a total of seven airliners. The initial business model of Air South in the first year of operation showed a profit, rare in any startup.

== Destinations ==
Air South offered scheduled flights to the following destinations during its existence with its small fleet of Boeing 737-200 jetliners:

Location	State	Airport	Commenced	Ceased
Jacksonville	Florida	Jacksonville International Airport	1994	1997
Miami	Florida	Miami International Airport	1994	1997
Tallahassee	Florida	Tallahassee Regional Airport	1994	1996
Tampa Bay Area	Florida	St. Petersburg–Clearwater International Airport	1994	1996
Atlanta	Georgia	Hartsfield Atlanta International Airport (base)	1994	1997
Savannah	Georgia	Savannah-Hilton Head International Airport	1996	1997
Chicago	Illinois	Chicago Midway International Airport	1996	1997
Baltimore	Maryland	Baltimore-Washington International Airport	1994	1995
New York City	New York	John F. Kennedy International Airport	1996	1997
Raleigh/Durham	North Carolina	Raleigh–Durham International Airport	1994	1996
Columbia	South Carolina	Columbia Metropolitan Airport (base)	1994	1997
Charleston	South Carolina	Charleston International Airport	1996	1997
Greenville	South Carolina	Greenville–Spartanburg International Airport	1996	1997
Myrtle Beach	South Carolina	Myrtle Beach International Airport	1994	1997
Norfolk	Virginia	Norfolk International Airport	1996	1997

== See also ==
- List of defunct airlines of the United States
