= Lexington County Public Library =

- 33°58′31″N 81°13′11″W
- Location: Lexington County, South Carolina
- Type: Public library
- Established: 1912
- Branches: 10

Collection
- Size: 695,438 (2021)

Access and use
- Circulation: 2.1M (2020)
- Population served: 262,000 (2020)
- Members: ~160,000 (2020)

Other information
- Budget: $9M (2020)
- Director: Kelly Poole
- Employees: 151 (2021)
- Website: http://www.lexcolibrary.com

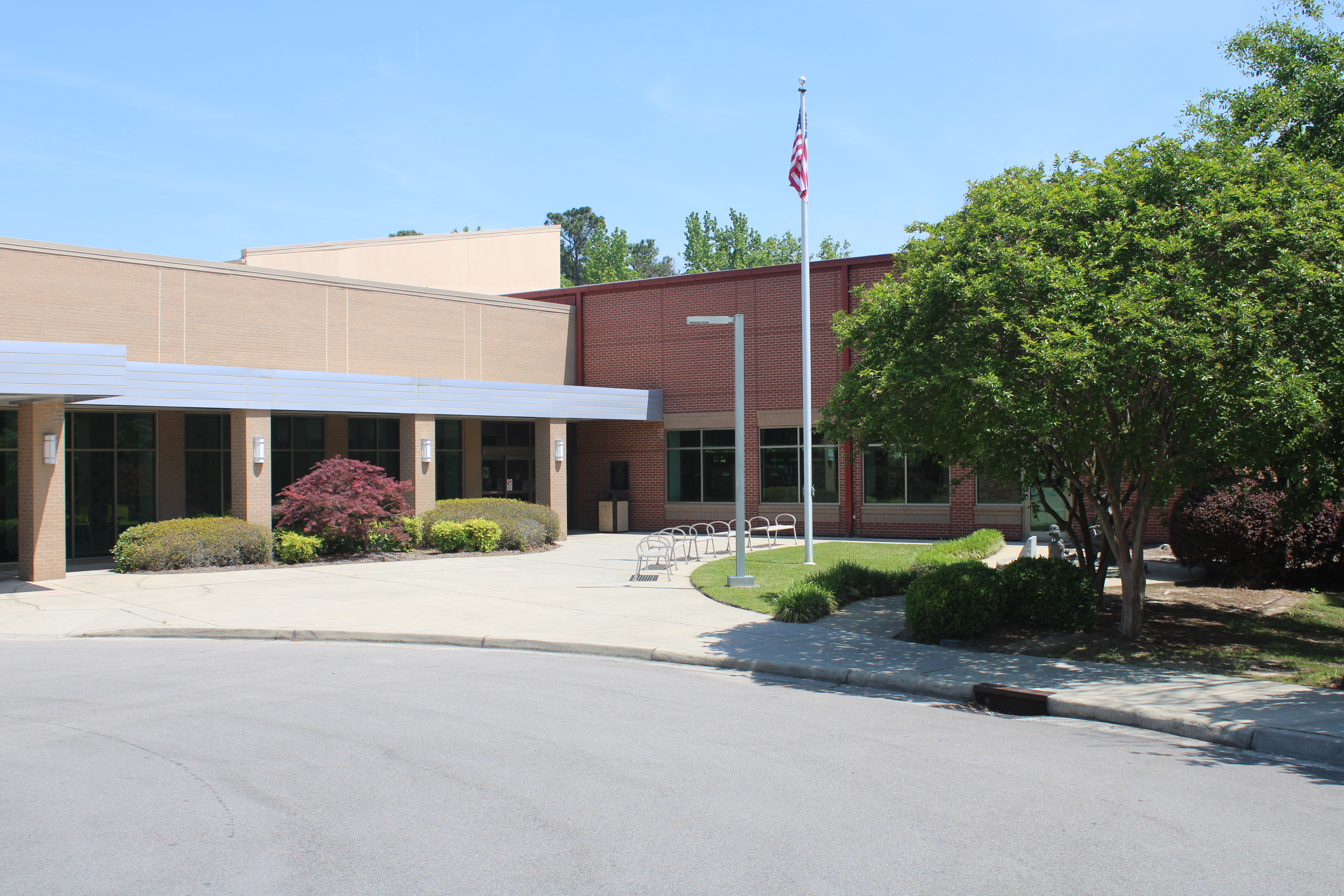
Lexington Main Library

The Lexington County Public Library is the public library system of Lexington County, South Carolina. It has 10 branches, including its 48,000 sq ft (4,500 m^{2}) Main Library, built in 1998. The library has branches in Batesburg-Leesville, West Columbia, Chapin, Gaston, Gilbert, Irmo, Lexington, Pelion, South Congaree, and Swansea. The library also has mobile library services, including a browsing mobile library bus with scheduled routes throughout Lexington County, home delivery services and Materials by Mail.

== History ==
The Lexington County Public Library began in 1912 in Batesburg with a collection of books at the Batesburg Town Hall. The Batesburg Women’s Club sponsored the library, assisted by the WPA, until 1942 when it deeded the library to a board of trustees. In 1948, an act of legislation formed the county-wide Lexington County Circulating Library system with Batesburg as the headquarters. A bookmobile was purchased in 1949 and replaced in 1955 with the first air-conditioned bookmobile in the state. The library was designated as part of the county government and renamed the Lexington County Public Library System in 1979.

- Batesburg – Leesville Branch’s current building opened in 1967 and served as the headquarters until the Lexington Main Library opened in 1998. The first library service in the Town of Lexington was in 1948 in a building beside the Town Hall and from 1976 to 1998 the Lexington Branch was on Park Road.
- The current Cayce-West Columbia Branch was established in the old Compton’s Department Store in 1992. The first library in the community was in the Brooklyn-Cayce school building and the R.H. Smith Branch served the area from 1960-1992.
- The current Chapin Branch opened in 1997. Previously it was established in an old jail building in 1949 and then in an old elementary school library.
- Gaston Branch’s current building opened in 1996. The first branch was established in the Town Hall of Gaston in 1981.
- Gilbert-Summit Branch’s current building opened in 1996. The first branch was established in the old Town Hall in 1988.
- Irmo Branch’s current building opened in 1998. From 1974-1998 it was in a remodeled trailer.
- Pelion Branch’s current building opened in 2000. The first branch was established in the Holy Trinity Lutheran Church parsonage.
- South Congaree-Pine Ridge Branch and the Swansea Branch’s current buildings opened in 2007. In 1950, a branch was established in Robert’s Grocery Store in Swansea.
