= Congaree Vista =

Section of Columbia, South Carolina, US

Coordinates: 33°59′59″N 81°02′19″W

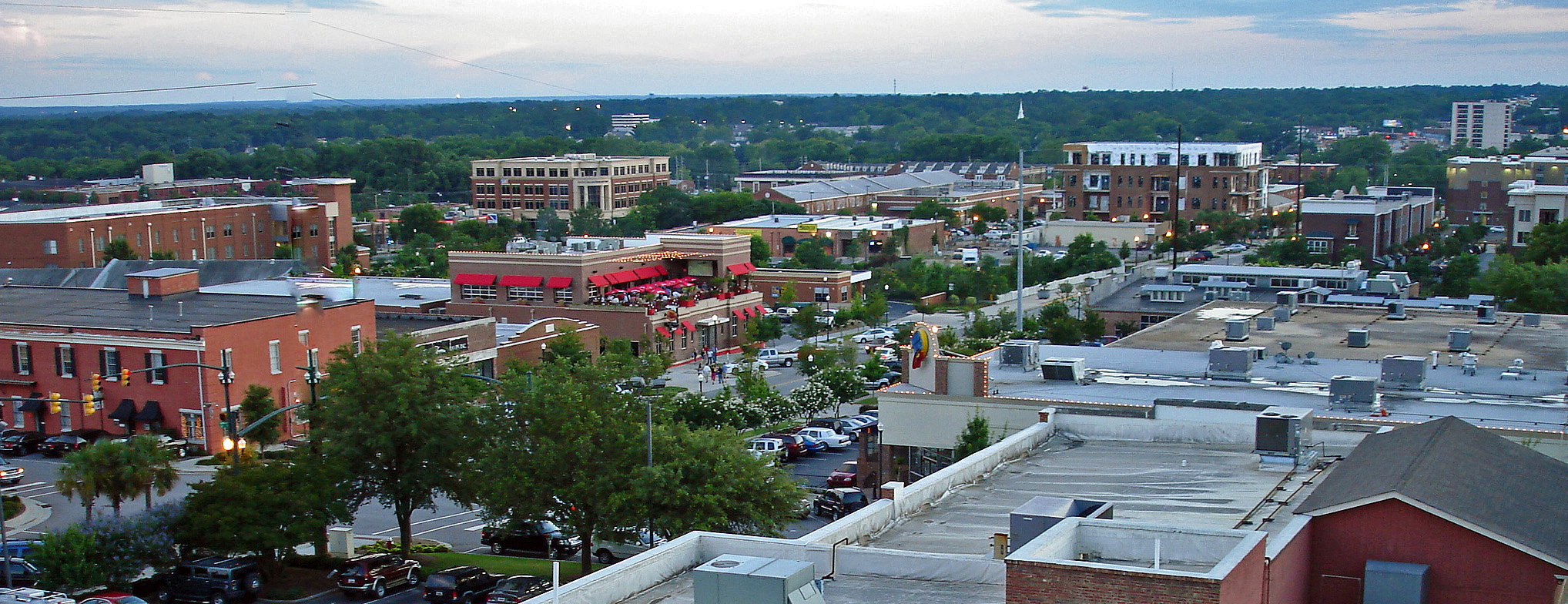
A view of the Congaree Vista from Lady Street in Downtown Columbia

The Congaree Vista is a section of Columbia, South Carolina, between the Congaree River and the central business district of downtown.

The neighborhood was revitalized during the late 1990s and early 2000s. The section includes many small, upscale shops and restaurants, often in renovated warehouse buildings. "The Vista," as it is known by locals, is centered on one of the city's old train stations along Gervais Street. Also in this area is the historic Adluh Flour Mill, one of the few productive remnants of the district's industrial past. In the past decade, the Vista has become a major entertainment and retail district for downtown Columbia and the Midlands (South Carolina) region of the state. Several hotels have been constructed in the area due to its economic benefits and close proximity to the University of South Carolina and centralized downtown location.
