= The Smubbs =

American rock band (1964–1970)

- Origin: Long Island, New York
- Genres: Psychedelia; rock; pop; folk
- Years active: 1964-1970
- Labels: ABC-Paramount; Spring; Monument

The Smubbs were an American psychedelic pop band formed in Long Island, New York during 1964. The group went on to play with several popular musicians of the time: opening for the Byrds and James Gang, playing a free concert alongside Spooky Tooth and Traffic, and eventually touring with Pete Seeger. They released a single studio album and multiple singles before breaking up in 1970. They were one of the earliest musicians who grew public environmental awareness through their music.

== History ==
Brothers Richard Segall and Michael Segall formed the Smubbs with St. Anthony's schoolmates George Utter, brothers Jimmy Braunreuther and Al Braunreuther, and Mollinelli. (Note: Mollinelli's first name goes unremembered.) The band's name came as a combination of the founding members' last initials, though Mollinelli soon left the band.

They released their debut single under ABC-Paramount Records in 1966. Jerry Davis and Vinny Villany replaced the Braunreuthers before the Smubbs' second single was released in 1968. From the local attention they garnered, they were able to secure a new contract with Monument Records. Their long play album This Is The End Of The Night! would be released under this label, remaining today as the only album published from before their break-up. Around this time they would perform for several different TV programs, including Upbeat and WCBS-TV's Callback!

They would perform their last single, "Un-Pollution," while dressed in pig costumes during the first Earth Day celebration. The single's record released with an extended version that included an audio excerpt from then-president Richard Nixon's 1970 State of the Union Address. The record was thereafter sent to every United States representative, senator, and governor. The environmental conscientiousness displayed by the group attracted the attention of Pete Seeger, who invited them on a nationwide tour. The band broke up later that year, after which Richard Segall and his wife moved to Hollywood where their son Ricky Segall played the role of Little Ricky on The Partridge Family. George Utter and Steven Shene continued their musical career and formed Day Olde Tradition with Shene's wife.

The Smubbs' former manager Louis Lofredo published new digital content from the band in 2018 under Carlou Music (BMI). This included unreleased tracks and re-recordings of previously released tracks. This content was published without the input of any former band members.

== Personnel ==
Founding members

- Richard Segall – vocals (1964-1970)
- Mollinelli – percussion (1964)
- George Utter – rhythm guitar (1964-1970)
- Jimmy Braunreuther – lead guitar (1964-1967)
- Al Braunreuther – percussion (1964-1967)
- Michael Segall – bass, backing vocals (1964-1968; died 2023)

Later members

- Jerry Davis – lead guitar (1967-1970; died)
- Vinny Villany – percussion (1967-1970; died)
- Steven Shene – bass (1968-1970)
- Nicholas Marchiano – (1970)

== Discography ==
=== Singles ===
- "Down On The Corner" / "Don't Come Close" (1966) (ABC 45-10797)
- "It Can't Be Too Late" / "Her Love" (1968) (Spring SK 703 SS)
- "Rosary Anne" / "Mr. Open Minded" (1968) (Monument MN 45-1110)
- "Wait Another Heartache" / "White Paper Sail" (1969) (Monument MN 45-1141)
- "Mommas Blues" / "Children" (1970)
- "Un-Pollution (Short Version)" / "Un-Pollution (Complete Version)" (1970) (Monument MN 45-1191)

=== Albums ===
- This Is The End Of The Night! (1969) (Monument SLP 18112)
- The Last Album (2018)
