= West Columbia, South Carolina =

City in South Carolina, US

- City
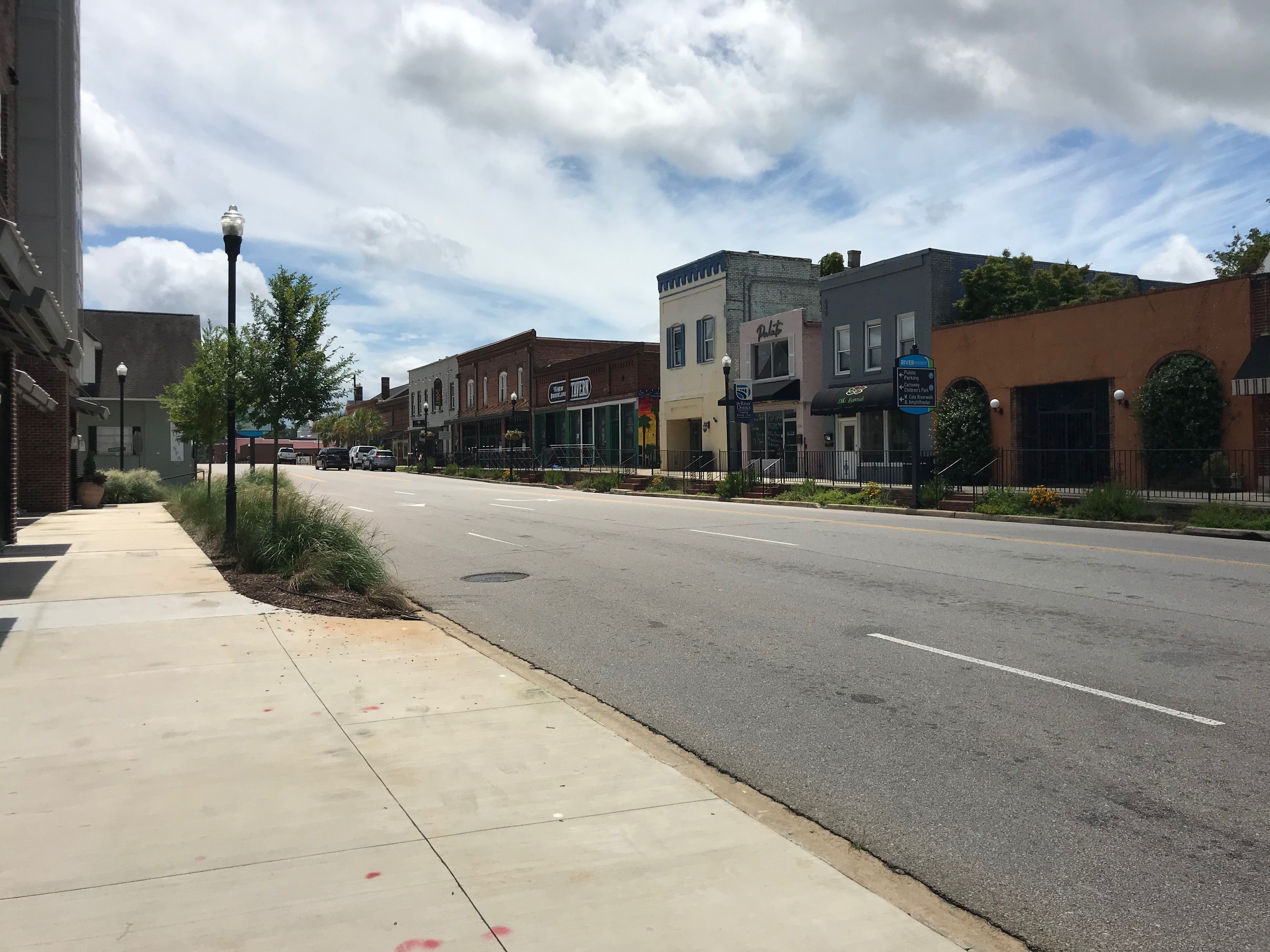
- State Street in downtown West Columbia

- Seal
- Motto: "Bridging Past, Present, And Future"
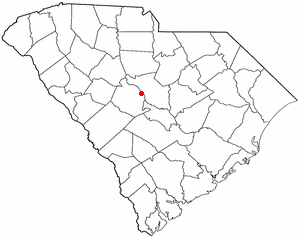
- Location in Lexington County, South Carolina
- Coordinates: 33°59′30″N 81°07′23″W
- Country: United States
- State: South Carolina
- County: Lexington

Government
  - Type: City Council, City Administrator
  - Mayor: Tem Miles

Area
  - Total: 9.47 sq mi (24.53 km^{2})
  - Land: 9.30 sq mi (24.08 km^{2})
  - Water: 0.17 sq mi (0.45 km^{2})
- Elevation: 282 ft (86 m)

Population (2020)
  - Total: 17,416
  - Density: 1,873.5/sq mi (723.38/km^{2})
- Time zone: UTC−5 (EST)
  - Summer (DST): UTC−4 (EDT)
- Area codes: 803, 839
- FIPS code: 45-75850
- GNIS feature ID: 2405706
- Website: www.westcolumbiasc.gov

West Columbia, formerly Brookland, is a city and commuter town in the suburban eastern sections of Lexington County, South Carolina, United States. As of the 2020 census, West Columbia had a population of 17,416. West Columbia is bordered to the east by Columbia, the state capital, across the Congaree River. It is near Columbia's city center or downtown district as well as the South Carolina State House and the Congaree Vista, known locally as "the Vista". The city is bordered to the south by its sister suburb, Cayce. A small portion of the city borders the town of Lexington to the east. West Columbia is part of the greater Columbia, South Carolina metropolitan area.

== History ==
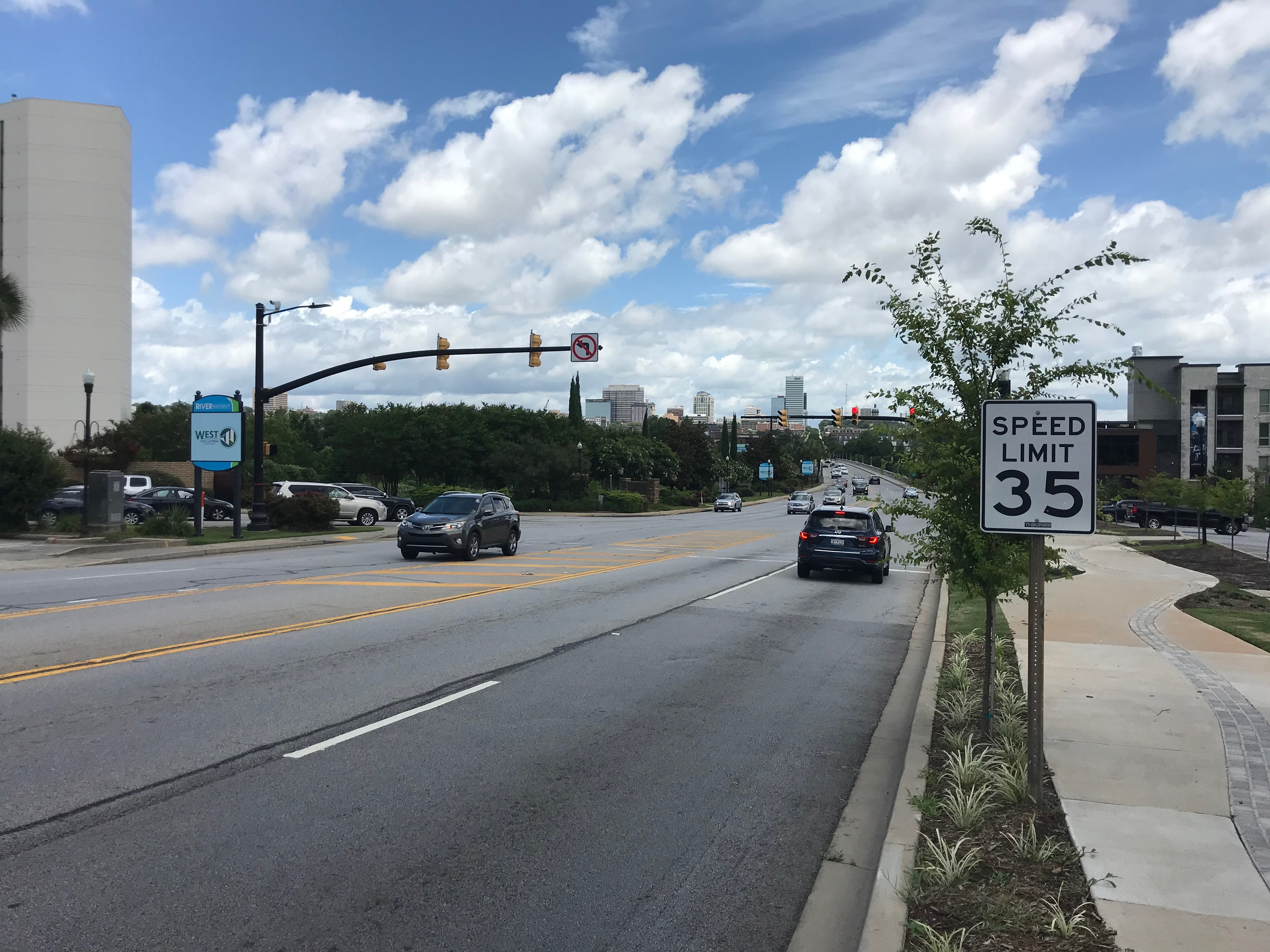
West Columbia overlooking Columbia over the Congaree River and the Gervais Street Bridge

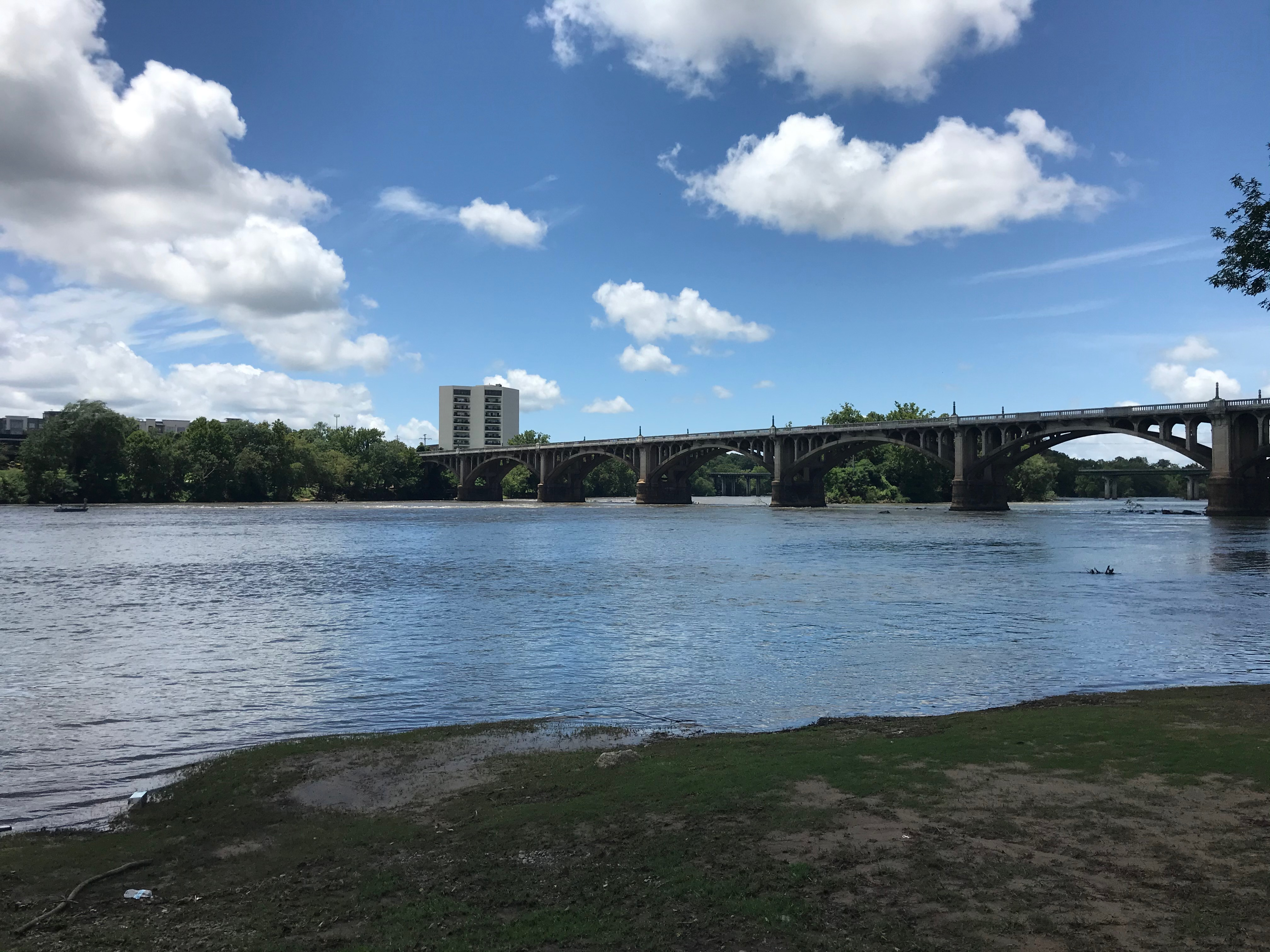
West Columbia from Richland County; includes the Congaree River and the Gervais Street Bridge

West Columbia was incorporated in 1894 as "Brookland", but the U.S. Postal Service called the town "New Brookland" since there was another town called Brookland. In 1936, the name was changed to "West Columbia" to emphasize its proximity to Columbia, the capital. Numerous businesses, churches and a high school retain the Brookland and New Brookland names.

The Gervais Street Bridge, Mount Hebron Temperance Hall, New Brookland Historic District, and Saluda Factory Historic District are listed on the National Register of Historic Places.

The 2008 South Carolina Learjet 60 crash occurred just before midnight on September 19, 2008, when a Learjet 60 (registration N999LJ) crashed while taking off from Columbia Metropolitan Airport. The weather at the time was cool, dry, and clear. The plane hit runway lights and crashed through the boundary fence, crossing South Carolina Highway 302 (SC 302/Edmund Highway/Airport Boulevard), and coming to rest on an embankment by the side of the highway. No one on the ground was hurt, but four of the six people on the plane (including both pilots) died in the crash, while the other two, Travis Barker (the drummer of Blink-182) and Adam Goldstein (DJ AM of Crazy Town), suffered severe burns. The plane was a charter flight taken by Barker, Goldstein and their entourage following a performance by their musical group TRV$DJAM at a free concert in Five Points earlier that night to Van Nuys, California.

== Geography ==
West Columbia lies to the south and west of the Saluda and Congaree rivers.

According to the United States Census Bureau, the city has a total area of 6.3 square miles (16.3 km^{2}), of which 6.1 square miles (15.7 km^{2}) is land and 0.2 square mile (0.5 km^{2}) (3.18%) is water.

== Demographics ==
Historical population
Census	Pop.	Note	%±
1900	1,089		—
1910	900		−17.4%
1920	1,793		99.2%
1930	1,722		−4.0%
1940	1,744		1.3%
1950	1,543		−11.5%
1960	6,410		315.4%
1970	7,838		22.3%
1980	10,409		32.8%
1990	10,588		1.7%
2000	13,064		23.4%
2010	14,988		14.7%
2020	17,416		16.2%
2025 (est.)	18,489	▲	6.2%
U.S. Decennial Census

=== 2020 census ===
As of the 2020 census, West Columbia had a population of 17,416 people, 8,138 households, and 3,764 families residing in the city. The median age was 40.4 years; 17.0% of residents were under the age of 18 and 21.8% of residents were 65 years of age or older. For every 100 females there were 92.7 males, and for every 100 females age 18 and over there were 90.4 males age 18 and over.

100.0% of residents lived in urban areas, while 0.0% lived in rural areas.

Of the 8,138 households, 20.3% had children under the age of 18 living in them. Of all households, 31.1% were married-couple households, 25.5% were households with a male householder and no spouse or partner present, and 36.7% were households with a female householder and no spouse or partner present. About 40.2% of all households were made up of individuals and 16.2% had someone living alone who was 65 years of age or older.

There were 9,068 housing units, of which 10.3% were vacant. The homeowner vacancy rate was 1.6% and the rental vacancy rate was 9.4%.

Racial composition as of the 2020 census
Race	Number	Percent
White	11,281	64.8%
Black or African American	2,981	17.1%
American Indian and Alaska Native	149	0.9%
Asian	492	2.8%
Native Hawaiian and Other Pacific Islander	10	0.1%
Some other race	1,113	6.4%
Two or more races	1,390	8.0%
Hispanic or Latino (of any race)	2,150	12.3%

=== 2000 census ===
As of the census of 2000, there were 13,064 people, 5,968 households, and 3,300 families residing in the city. The population density was 2,150.6 inhabitants per square mile (830.4/km^{2}). There were 6,436 housing units at an average density of 1,059.5 per square mile (409.1/km^{2}). The racial makeup of the city was 74.54% White, 19.81% African American, 0.28% Native American, 1.71% Asian, 0.02% Pacific Islander, 2.04% from other races, and 1.61% from two or more races. Hispanic or Latino of any race were 4.66% of the population.

There were 5,968 households, out of which 22.0% had children under the age of 18 living with them, 37.5% were married couples living together, 14.3% had a female householder with no husband present, and 44.7% were non-families. 36.1% of all households were made up of individuals, and 13.0% had someone living alone who was 65 years of age or older. The average household size was 2.13 and the average family size was 2.76.

In the city, the population was spread out, with 18.8% under the age of 18, 10.1% from 18 to 24, 30.0% from 25 to 44, 22.1% from 45 to 64, and 19.0% who were 65 years of age or older. The median age was 39 years. For every 100 females, there were 88.5 males. For every 100 females age 18 and over, there were 86.1 males.

The median income for a household in the city was $30,999, and the median income for a family was $40,253. Males had a median income of $30,033 versus $24,637 for females. The per capita income for the city was $18,135. About 12.8% of families and 16.8% of the population were below the poverty line, including 24.5% of those under age 18 and 11.4% of those age 65 or over. West Columbia is the home of Glenforest School.

== Education ==
Most of West Columbia is served by Lexington County School District 2 and is zoned for Airport High School in West Columbia and Brookland-Cayce High School in Cayce. The furthest western portion of the city is served by Lexington County School District One and is zoned for River Bluff High School and White Knoll High School in Lexington.

The Cayce-West Columbia branch of the Lexington County Public Library serves the cities of Cayce and West Columbia.

== Notable people ==
- John Mark Dean, conservationist and marine biologist
- Peter Iacangelo, film, stage and television actor
- Hal Jeffcoat, former professional baseball player
- Troy Lesesne, professional soccer coach
- Duce Staley, former professional football player and football coach

== See also ==
- Columbia Metropolitan Airport
- Lexington Medical Center
- Riverbanks Zoo
