= Birch County, South Carolina =

Proposed county

A hypothetical map of South Carolina counties with Birch County highlighted in red. In this map, the borders are defined as the portions of Lexington County north of Lake Murray and the Saluda River, and the portions of Richland County west of the Broad River.

Birch County is a proposal to establish a county in the Midlands region of South Carolina. The county would comprise portions of northern Lexington County and northwestern portions of Richland County. The name "Birch" is an abbreviation derived from Ballentine, Irmo, and Chapin, three communities included within the proposed borders. This would have been the "illegal" 47th county in the state, as state law currently stipulates that South Carolina can have no more than 46 counties.

The move to create Birch County stems from citizens and businesses that were upset with tax and regulatory policies in Richland and Lexington counties. In December 2012, Rep. Nathan Ballentine, who resides in Chapin and represents District 71 in the South Carolina House of Representatives, said "chances are slim to none it would ever happen."

== History ==
The area that would have been Birch County has historically been considered to be part of South Carolina's Dutch Fork region, an area that was settled predominantly by German immigrants in the 1700s. Due to excellent arable land and access to waterways, the area was dominated by farming and remained rural in character for much of its history. While much of the proposed county remains rural, suburban development in the past few decades has increased the population and changed the characteristics of the area. The area is now best known for its middle class and affluent suburbs in the Columbia metropolitan area.

Since the damming of the Saluda River and the creation of Lake Murray in the 1920s, Chapin and the northern unincorporated portions of Lexington County have not physically connected to the remainder of county, causing significant logistical issues for residents and public services. Northwestern Richland County has also had differing opinions on taxation and growth management than the balance of Richland County (especially Columbia), thus leading to a push for Birch County.

== Geography ==
The proposed boundaries of the county would have likely been conterminous with the area zoned for Lexington & Richland County School District Five. If created, the county would be the smallest-sized county in the state. It is anticipated that the county would be bordered by Lake Murray and the existing city limits of Columbia and West Columbia to the south, by the Broad River to the east, and by Newberry County to the north and west. Communities that would be included in Birch County include Ballentine, Irmo, Chapin, Lake Murray, and White Rock.

== Population ==
According to a January 2013 article in The State newspaper, the estimated population of the proposed county would be near 50,000, which would rank it in the middle range of South Carolina county populations. Based on the 2010 Census, the proposed new county would be more populated than Chesterfield County, and less populated than Cherokee County.

== See also ==
- List of counties in South Carolina
- List of U.S. county secession proposals
