= South Carolina Science Olympiad =

Annual science competition held in South Carolina, United States

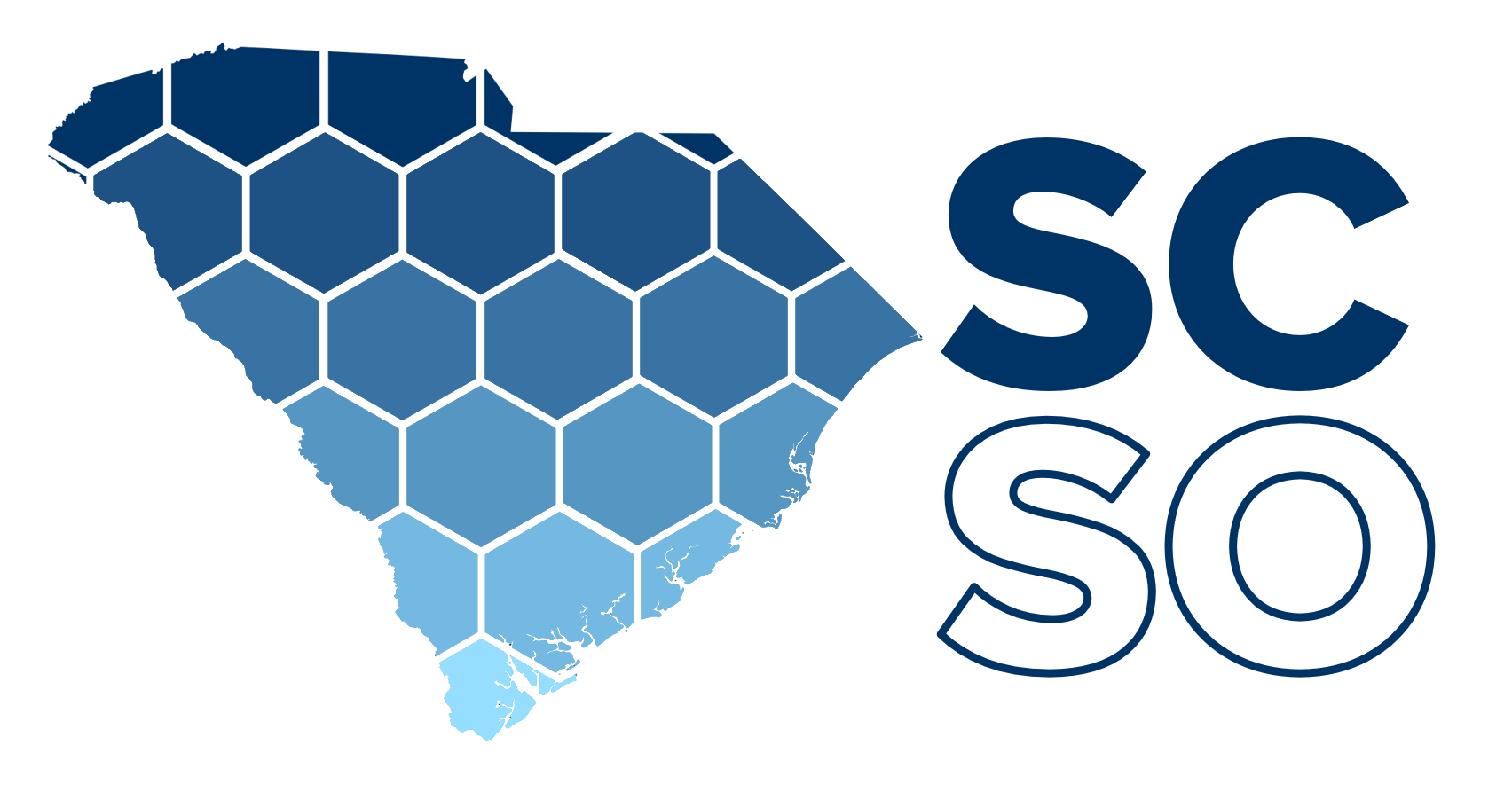
- Abbreviation: SCSO
- Formation: 1985; 41 years ago
- Founded at: Newberry, SC
- Type: Science competition
- Headquarters: Presbyterian College, Clinton, South Carolina
- State Director: Patrick Nelson (since 2025)
- Current Division B Champions: Clinton Middle School (22nd title)
- Current Division C Champions: Clinton High School (13th title)
- Parent organization: Science Olympiad
- Website: www.scscioly.org

The South Carolina Science Olympiad Competition, often abbreviated as SCSO, is an annual Science Olympiad competition comprising middle school and high school teams across South Carolina. The competition was first held in the C Division (grades 9–12) in 1985, with the inaugural state champions being Irmo High School from Irmo. Bell Street Middle School from Clinton won the first B Division (grades 6–9) state championship a year later. The winners of the tournament represent South Carolina at the Science Olympiad National Tournament, held in May at various universities across the nation.

The current state champions are Clinton Middle School and Clinton High School, who won their 22nd and 13th state championships, respectively, on March 2, 2024.

Patrick Nelson assumed the position of State Director for the 2025 season; he replaced Dr. Jennifer Albert.

== History ==
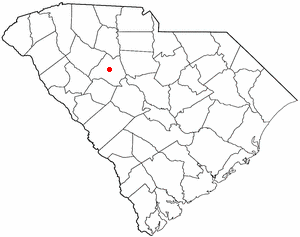
Newberry was the host of the state competition from its start in 1985 to 2018.

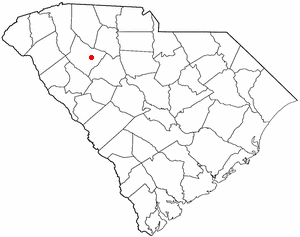
Presbyterian College, in Clinton, has hosted the state competition since 2025.

The competition has been held every year since 1985 for Division C and since 1986 for Division B, with the exception of 2020, when the competition was canceled due to the COVID-19 pandemic.

Year	Division B Champions	Division C Champions	Host
1985	—N/a	Irmo	Newberry College; Newberry, SC
1986	Bell Street	Irmo	Newberry College; Newberry, SC
1987	Bell Street	Irmo	Newberry College; Newberry, SC
1988	Irmo	Irmo	Newberry College; Newberry, SC
1989	Irmo	Irmo	Newberry College; Newberry, SC
1990	Irmo	Irmo	Newberry College; Newberry, SC
1991	Irmo	Irmo	Newberry College; Newberry, SC
1992	Irmo	Irmo	Newberry College; Newberry, SC
1993	Irmo	Irmo	Newberry College; Newberry, SC
1994	Irmo	Irmo	Newberry College; Newberry, SC
1995	Irmo	Irmo	Newberry College; Newberry, SC
1996	Irmo	Dutch Fork	Newberry College; Newberry, SC
1997	Irmo	Dutch Fork	Newberry College; Newberry, SC
1998	Irmo	Dutch Fork	Newberry College; Newberry, SC
1999	Dutch Fork	Irmo	Newberry College; Newberry, SC
2000	Dutch Fork	Irmo	Newberry College; Newberry, SC
2001	Dutch Fork	Dutch Fork	Newberry College; Newberry, SC
2002	Dutch Fork	Irmo	Newberry College; Newberry, SC
2003	Bell Street	Irmo	Newberry College; Newberry, SC
2004	Bell Street	Irmo	Newberry College; Newberry, SC
2005	Bell Street	Irmo	Newberry College; Newberry, SC
2006	Bell Street	Irmo	Newberry College; Newberry, SC
2007	Bell Street	Irmo	Newberry College; Newberry, SC
2008	Bell Street	Irmo	Newberry College; Newberry, SC
2009	Bell Street	Clinton	Newberry College; Newberry, SC
2010	Bell Street	Clinton	Newberry College; Newberry, SC
2011	Bell Street	Clinton	Newberry College; Newberry, SC
2012	Bell Street	Clinton	Newberry College; Newberry, SC
2013	Bell Street	Clinton	Newberry College; Newberry, SC
2014	Bell Street	Clinton	Newberry College; Newberry, SC
2015	Bell Street	Academic Magnet	Newberry College; Newberry, SC
2016	Clinton (Note: Changed name from Bell Street to Clinton prior to 2016 tournament.)	Clinton	Newberry College; Newberry, SC
2017	Clinton	Clinton	Newberry College; Newberry, SC
2018	Clinton	Clinton	Newberry College; Newberry, SC
2019	Clinton	Academic Magnet	The Citadel; Charleston, SC
2020	Cancelled due to the COVID-19 pandemic.		The Citadel; Charleston, SC
2021 (Note: Competition was hosted by The Citadel but held virtually.)	GREEN Charter	Clinton	The Citadel; Charleston, SC
2022	Clinton	Clinton	The Citadel; Charleston, SC
2023	Clinton	Clinton	The Citadel; Charleston, SC
2024	Clinton	Clinton	The Citadel; Charleston, SC

Indicates team won the national tournament.

== Statistics ==
=== State Championships by School ===
Division B
Rank	School	No.	Years
1	Bell Street M.S./Clinton M.S.	22	1986, 1987, 2003, 2004, 2005, 2006, 2007, 2008, 2009, 2010, 2011, 2012, 2013, 2014, 2015, 2016, 2017, 2018, 2019, 2022, 2023, 2024
2	Irmo M.S.	11	**1988, 1989, 1990**, 1991, 1992, 1993, 1994, 1995, 1996, 1997, 1998
3	Dutch Fork M.S.	4	1999, 2000, 2001, 2002
4	GREEN Charter School	1	2021

Division C
Rank	School	No.	Years
1	Irmo H.S.	20	1985, 1986, **1987**, 1988, **1989, 1990**, 1991, 1992, 1993, 1994, 1995, 1999, 2000, 2002, 2003, 2004, 2005, 2006, 2007, 2008
2	Clinton H.S.	13	2009, 2010, 2011, 2012, 2013, 2014, 2016, 2017, 2018, 2021, 2022, 2023, 2024
3	Dutch Fork H.S.	4	1996, 1997, 1998, 2001
4	Academic Magnet H.S.	2	2015, 2019

BOLD denotes a national championship.

== Results ==
- Score is calculated by giving 1 point for a first-place finish, 2 points for a second-place finish, etc.
- In final events standings, **(D)** denotes defending champions.

=== 2024 Competition ===
Division B – event placement
Event	First place	Second place	Third place
**Air Trajectory**	Green Charter	Clinton A	—N/a
**Anatomy and Physiology**	Clinton A	Green Charter	—N/a
**Can't Judge a Powder**	Clinton A	Green Charter	—N/a
**Codebusters**	Clinton A	Green Charter	—N/a
**Crime Busters**	Green Charter	Clinton A	—N/a
**Disease Detectives**	Clinton A	Green Charter	—N/a
**Dynamic Planet**	Green Charter	Clinton A	Clinton B
**Ecology**	Clinton A	Green Charter	—N/a
**Experimental Design**	Clinton A	Green Charter	Clinton B
**Fast Facts**	Green Charter	Clinton A	—N/a
**Flight**	Clinton A	Green Charter	—N/a
**Forestry**	Clinton A	Green Charter	—N/a
**Fossils**	Clinton A	Green Charter	—N/a
**Meteorology**	Clinton A	Green Charter	—N/a
**Microbe Mission**	Clinton A	Green Charter	—N/a
**Optics**	Clinton A	Green Charter	—N/a
**Reach for the Stars**	Clinton A	Green Charter	—N/a
**Road Scholar**	Clinton A	Green Charter	Clinton B
**Roller Coaster**	Clinton A	Green Charter	—N/a
**Tower**	Green Charter	Clinton A	—N/a
**Wheeled Vehicle**	Clinton A	Green Charter	—N/a
**Wind Power**	Clinton A	Green Charter	—N/a
**Write It Do It**	Green Charter	Clinton A	—N/a
Winning team

Division B – final standings
Position	Team	Score
1	Clinton A **(D)**	29
2	Green Charter	40
3	Clinton B	89

Division C – event placement
Event	First place	Second place	Third place	Fourth Place
**Air Trajectory**	Clinton	Lexington	Academic Magnet A	Spring Hill Gold
**Anatomy and Physiology**	Clinton	Porter-Gaud	West Ashley	Lucy Beckham Blue
**Astronomy**	Dutch Fork Alpha	Academic Magnet A	Lexington	Clinton
**Chemistry Lab**	Fort Mill	Catawba Ridge	Academic Magnet A	Chapin B
**Codebusters**	Academic Magnet A	Clinton	Dutch Fork Alpha	GSSM
**Detector Building**	Lexington	Spring Hill Red	Clinton	Dutch Fork Alpha
**Disease Detectives**	Clinton	Lexington	Academic Magnet A	West Ashley
**Dynamic Planet**	Clinton	Lexington	Academic Magnet A	Dutch Fork Alpha
**Ecology**	Catawba Ridge	Spring Hill Red	Lexington	Chapin A
**Experimental Design**	Academic Magnet A	Clinton	Chapin A	West Ashley
**Fermi Questions**	Academic Magnet A	Lexington	Chapin B	Clinton
**Flight**	Lexington	Academic Magnet A	Academic Magnet B	Spring Hill Gold
**Forensics**	Clinton	GSSM	Chapin A	Lexington
**Forestry**	Lexington	Spring Hill Red	Clinton	Dutch Fork Alpha
**Fossils**	Spring Hill Red	Clinton	Chapin A	Dutch Fork Alpha
**Geologic Mapping**	Lucy Beckham Green	Clinton	Spring Hill Red	Chapin A
**Microbe Mission**	Academic Magnet A	Dutch Fork Alpha	Clinton	Academic Magnet B
**Optics**	Dutch Fork Alpha	Academic Magnet A	Academic Magnet B	Catawba Ridge
**Robot Tour**	Clinton	Chapin A	Catawba Ridge	Academic Magnet B
**Scrambler**	Clinton	Lexington	Lucy Beckham Blue	Spring Hill Red
**Towers**	Lexington	Clinton	Lucy Beckham Blue	Chapin A
**Wind Power**	Dutch Fork Alpha	Spring Hill Gold	Spring Hill Red	Lexington
**Write It Do It**	Lucy Beckham Blue	Academic Magnet A	Cross	West Ashley
Winning team

Division C – final standings
Position	Team	Score
1	Clinton **(D)**	85
2	Academic Magnet A	107
3	Lexington	124
4	Dutch Fork Alpha	148
5	Spring Hill Red	159
6	Chapin A	176
7	Lucy Beckham Blue	203
8	Spring Hill Gold	206
9	Academic Magnet B	238
10	Lucy Beckham Green	250
11	Catawba Ridge	257
12	West Ashley	271
13	Fort Mill	305
14	GSSM	339
15	Cross	348
16	Chapin B	360
17	Porter-Gaud	375
18	Dutch Fork Omega	383

=== 2023 Competition ===
The 2023 competition featured an amended slate of middle school events due to a lack of registered teams. The high school competition included the regular number of events. Both Division B and Division C competitions took place on April 1, 2023.

Division B – event placement
Event	First place	Second place	Third place
**Anatomy and Physiology**	Clinton A	Clinton B	—N/a
**Bio Process Lab**	Clinton A	Cross	—N/a
**Bridge**	Clinton A	Cross	Clinton B
**Can't Judge a Powder**	Clinton A	—N/a	—N/a
**Codebusters**	Clinton A	—N/a	—N/a
**Crime Busters**	Clinton A	—N/a	—N/a
**Disease Detectives**	Clinton A	—N/a	—N/a
**Dynamic Planet**	Clinton A	—N/a	—N/a
**Experimental Design**	Clinton A	—N/a	—N/a
**Flight**	Clinton A	Cross	—N/a
**Forestry**	Clinton A	—N/a	—N/a
**Green Generation**	Clinton A	Cross	—N/a
**Rocks and Minerals**	Clinton A	Cross	Clinton B
**Roller Coaster**	Clinton A	—N/a	—N/a
**Solar System**	Clinton A	—N/a	—N/a
**Storm the Castle**	Clinton A	—N/a	—N/a
**Write It Do It**	Clinton A	—N/a	—N/a
**Wheeled Vehicle**	Clinton A	—N/a	—N/a
Winning team

Division B – final standings
Position	Team	Score
1	Clinton A **(D)**	17
2	Cross	59
3	Clinton B	64

Division C – event placement
Event	First place	Second place	Third place	Fourth Place
**Anatomy and Physiology**	Spring Hill Red	Academic Magnet B	Clinton	Spring Hill Gold
**Astronomy**	Clinton	Chapin 1	Dutch Fork 1	Academic Magnet A
**Bridge**	Clinton	Spring Hill Red	Academic Magnet A	Academic Magnet B
**Cell Biology**	Academic Magnet B	Academic Magnet A	Clinton	Dutch Fork 2
**Chemistry Lab**	Clinton	Academic Magnet A	Dutch Fork 1	Chapin 2
**Codebusters**	Academic Magnet A	Dutch Fork 1	Clinton	Lucy Beckham
**Detector Building**	Chapin 1	Clinton	Academic Magnet A	Dutch Fork 1
**Disease Detectives**	Academic Magnet A	Academic Magnet B	Lucy Beckham	Dutch Fork 1
**Dynamic Planet**	Clinton	Spring Hill Red	Dutch Fork 1	Chapin 1
**Environmental Chemistry**	Clinton	Academic Magnet A	Spring Hill Red	Spring Hill Gold
**Experimental Design**	Academic Magnet A	Chapin 1	Clinton	Spring Hill Red
**Fermi Questions**	Dutch Fork 1	Lexington	Chapin 1	Clinton
**Flight**	Lexington	Chapin 1	Clinton	Dutch Fork 1
**Forensics**	Academic Magnet A	Chapin 1	Dutch Fork 1	Clinton
**Forestry**	Clinton	Academic Magnet B	Lucy Beckham	Spring Hill Red
**Green Generation**	Spring Hill Red	Lucy Beckham	West Ashley	Academic Magnet B
**It's About Time**	Spring Hill Gold	Clinton	Chapin 1	Academic Magnet A
**Remote Sensing**	Clinton	Dutch Fork 1	Chapin 1	Academic Magnet B
**Rocks and Minerals**	Lucy Beckham	Chapin 1	Clinton	Academic Magnet A
**Scrambler**	Clinton	Dutch Fork 1	Spring Hill Red	West Ashley
**Trajectory**	Chapin 2	Clinton	Academic Magnet A	Spring Hill Red
**WiFi Lab**	Clinton	Chapin 1	Academic Magnet A	Spring Hill Red
**Write It Do It**	Chapin 1	Lucy Beckham	Academic Magnet B	Dutch Fork 1
Winning team

Division C – final standings
Position	Team	Score
1	Clinton **(D)**	62
2	Academic Magnet A	105
3	Spring Hill Red	112
4	Chapin 1	117
5	Dutch Fork 1	129
6	Academic Magnet B	199
7	Spring Hill Gold	203
8	Lucy Beckham	214
9	West Ashley	228
10	Chapin 2	263
10	Dutch Fork 2	263
12	Lexington	294
13	Cross	299
14	Aiken Scholars	301

=== 2022 Competition ===
Like the 2021 competition, the 2022 competition did not include regional competitions due to lingering uncertainties regarding the COVID-19 pandemic. The state competition marked a return to an in-person format and included the standard slate of 23 events. While the middle school tournament was initially scheduled for an earlier date, a lack of registered teams resulted in both the competitions for Division B and Division C taking place on April 2, 2022.

Division B – event placement
Event	First place	Second place	Third place
**Anatomy and Physiology**	Clinton A	PALS	—N/a
**Bio Process Lab**	Clinton A	PALS	—N/a
**Bridge**	PALS	Clinton A	Clinton B
**Codebusters**	PALS	Clinton A	—N/a
**Crave the Wave**	Clinton A	PALS	—N/a
**Crime Busters**	Clinton A	PALS	—N/a
**Disease Detectives**	Clinton A	Clinton B	PALS
**Dynamic Planet**	Clinton A	PALS	—N/a
**Electric Wright Stuff**	Clinton A	PALS	—N/a
**Experimental Design**	Clinton A	PALS	Clinton B
**Food Science**	PALS	Clinton A	—N/a
**Green Generation**	PALS	Clinton A	—N/a
**Meteorology**	Clinton A	PALS	Clinton B
**Mission Possible**	PALS	Clinton A	—N/a
**Mousetrap Vehicle**	Clinton A	PALS	—N/a
**Ornithology**	Clinton A	PALS	—N/a
**Ping-Pong Parachute**	Clinton A	PALS	—N/a
**Road Scholar**	Clinton A	PALS	—N/a
**Rocks and Minerals**	Clinton A	PALS	—N/a
**Solar System**	Clinton B	Clinton A	PALS
**Sounds of Music**	PALS	Clinton A	—N/a
**Storm the Castle**	Clinton A	PALS	—N/a
**Write It Do It**	Clinton A	PALS	—N/a
Winning team

Division B – final standings
Position	Team	Score
1	Clinton A	30
2	PALS	42
3	Clinton B	84

Division C – event placement
Event	First place	Second place	Third place	Fourth Place
**Anatomy and Physiology**	Lexington	Clinton	Spring Hill 1	Academic Magnet 1
**Astronomy**	Chapin	Dutch Fork 1	Academic Magnet 2	Clinton
**Bridge**	Lexington	Clinton	Academic Magnet 1	Aiken Scholars
**Cell Biology**	Academic Magnet 2	Dutch Fork 1	Clinton	Chapin
**Chemistry Lab**	Clinton	Academic Magnet 1	Dutch Fork 1	West Ashley
**Codebusters**	Academic Magnet 1	Academic Magnet 2	Dutch Fork 1	Spring Valley A
**Detector Building**	Spring Hill 1	Dutch Fork 1	Clinton	Academic Magnet 1
**Disease Detectives**	Clinton	Irmo	Academic Magnet 2 and Spring Valley A (Tie)	
**Dynamic Planet**	Clinton	Dutch Fork 1	Lexington	Spring Hill 1
**Environmental Chemistry**	Academic Magnet 1	Dutch Fork 2	Clinton	Dutch Fork 1
**Experimental Design**	Clinton	Academic Magnet 1	Spring Hill 1	Spring Valley A
**Forensics**	Clinton	Academic Magnet 2	Dutch Fork 1	Spring Hill 2
**Gravity Vehicle**	Spring Valley A	West Ashley	Dutch Fork 1	Clinton
**Green Generation**	Chapin	Spring Valley A	River Bluff	Academic Magnet 2
**It's About Time**	Clinton	Chapin	Spring Hill 1	Dutch Fork 1
**Ornithology**	Spring Hill 1	Academic Magnet 2	Academic Magnet 1	Chapin
**Ping-Pong Parachute**	Dutch Fork 1	Academic Magnet 2	Clinton	Spring Hill 1
**Remote Sensing**	Chapin	Academic Magnet 2	Academic Magnet 1	Dutch Fork 1
**Rocks and Minerals**	Clinton	Academic Magnet 1	Chapin	Spring Valley A
**Trajectory**	Spring Valley A	Academic Magnet 2	Academic Magnet 1	Clinton
**WiFi Lab**	Academic Magnet 1	Dutch Fork 1	Clinton	Spring Hill 1
**Wright Stuff**	Chapin	Lexington	Clinton	Dutch Fork 1
**Write It Do It**	Lexington	Irmo	Spring Hill 2	Clinton
Winning team

Division C – final standings
Position	Team	Score
1	Clinton **(D)**	69
2	Dutch Fork 1	103
3	Academic Magnet 1	110
4	Spring Hill 1	120
5	Chapin	168
6	Academic Magnet 2	184
7	Spring Hill 2	189
8	Spring Valley A	214
9	West Ashley	226
10	Lexington	231
11	Irmo	267
12	River Bluff	273
13	Dutch Fork 2	284
14	Aiken Scholars	327
15	Spring Valley B	335

=== 2021 Competition ===
The 2021 competition did not include regional competitions due to the COVID-19 pandemic. The state competition was the first to be held virtually, and only included a selection of 12, test-only events. Many hands-on portions of some events were also cut. A trial competition was held on January 23, 2021, to test the virtual format, though only four events were run, and the results had no bearing on the actual competition. The state competition for Division C took place on March 20, 2021, and the competition for Division B took place a week later on March 27, 2021.

Division B – event placement
Event	First place	Second place	Third place	Fourth Place
**Anatomy and Physiology**	GREEN Charter A	GREEN Charter B	Chapin	Clinton A
**Crime Busters**	GREEN Charter A	Clinton A	GREEN Charter B	Chapin
**Density Lab**	Clinton A	GREEN Charter A	Chapin	GREEN Charter B
**Disease Detectives**	Chapin	Clinton A	GREEN Charter A	Clinton B
**Dynamic Planet**	GREEN Charter A	Clinton A	Chapin	Clinton B
**Experimental Design**	Clinton A	GREEN Charter A	GREEN Charter B	Chapin
**Food Science**	GREEN Charter A	Clinton A	GREEN Charter B	Chapin
**Fossils**	Clinton A	GREEN Charter A	—N/a	—N/a
**Heredity**	GREEN Charter A	Clinton A	GREEN Charter B	Chapin
**Meteorology**	Clinton A	GREEN Charter A	GREEN Charter B	Clinton B
**Ornithology**	GREEN Charter A	GREEN Charter B	Clinton A	Chapin
**Reach for the Stars**	Clinton A	GREEN Charter A	Clinton B	GREEN Charter B
Spirit Award: Clinton Middle School
Persistence Award: Chapin Middle School
Sportsmanship Award: GREEN Charter School
Winning team

Division B – final standings
Position	Team	Score
1	GREEN Charter A	19
2	Clinton A **(D)**	22
3	GREEN Charter B	45
4	Chapin	46
5	Clinton B	62

Division C – event placement
Event	First place	Second place	Third place	Fourth Place
**Anatomy and Physiology**	River Bluff B	Academic Magnet 1	Clinton	Academic Magnet 2
**Astronomy**	Academic Magnet 1	Dutch Fork	Scholars Academy A	Spring Hill 1
**Chemistry Lab**	Academic Magnet 1	River Bluff B	Clinton	Dutch Fork
**Codebusters**	Clinton	Academic Magnet 1	Dutch Fork	Academic Magnet 2
**Designer Genes**	Scholars Academy A	Dutch Fork	West Ashley	River Bluff A
**Disease Detectives**	River Bluff A	Clinton	Chapin	River Bluff B
**Dynamic Planet**	Academic Magnet 1	Clinton	Dutch Fork	Spring Valley A
**Experimental Design**	Clinton	Spring Hill 1	River Bluff A	Spring Valley B
**Forensics**	Academic Magnet 2	Academic Magnet 1	Clinton	Aiken Scholars
**Fossils**	Clinton	West Ashley	Spring Hill 2	Scholars Academy A
**Ornithology**	River Bluff A	Spring Hill 1	Chapin	Spring Valley A
**Water Quality**	Clinton	River Bluff A	Dutch Fork	Academic Magnet 1
Spirit Award: Spring Valley High School
Persistence Award: Aiken Scholars Academy
Leadership Award: Scholars Academy
Sportsmanship Award: West Ashley High School
Winning team

Division C – final standings
Position	Team	Score
1	Clinton	39
2	River Bluff A	59
3	Academic Magnet 1 **(D)**	60
4	Dutch Fork	75
5	Spring Hill 1	77
6	West Ashley	85
7	Chapin	103
8	River Bluff B	106
9	Scholars Academy A	111
10	Academic Magnet 2	113
11	Irmo	114
12	Spring Hill 2	125
13	Spring Valley A	131
14	Spring Valley B	133
15	Aiken Scholars	141
16	Scholars Academy B	184

=== 2019 Competition ===
The 2019 competition was the first to feature regional competitions; teams were able to compete in whichever regional they prefer but were only allowed to compete in one. Regional competitions were held on February 23, 2019, at Newberry College and March 2, 2019, at The Citadel. The state competition was held on March 16, 2019, at The Citadel.

==== Newberry Regional ====
Division B – event placement
Event	First place	Second place	Third place	Fourth place
**Anatomy & Physiology**	GREEN Charter – 1	Irmo	Chapin	Meadow Glen – 1
**Battery Buggy**	GREEN Charter – 1	GREEN Charter – 2	Irmo	Meadow Glen – 2
**Boomilever**	GREEN Charter – 1	GREEN Charter – 2	Pleasant Knoll	Meadow Glen – 2
**Circuit Lab**	GREEN Charter – 1	Meadow Glen – 1	Irmo	Ben Lippen
**Crimebusters**	Langston Charter	Pleasant Knoll	Banks Trail	GREEN Charter – 1
**Density Lab**	Pleasant Knoll	Irmo	Mid Carolina	Meadow Glen – 2
**Disease Detectives**	Ben Lippen	Banks Trail	Pleasant Knoll	Meadow Glen – 1
**Dynamic Planet**	GREEN Charter – 1	Meadow Glen – 1	E.P. Todd	Ben Lippen
**Experimental Design**	Banks Trail	Meadow Glen – 1	Irmo	Chapin
**Elastic Launch Glider**	GREEN Charter – 2	GREEN Charter – 1	Pleasant Knoll	Irmo
**Fossils**	Pleasant Knoll	Chapin	Banks Trail	Meadow Glen – 1
**Game On**	Chapin	Pleasant Knoll	Langston Charter	E.P. Todd
**Heredity**	Irmo	Langston Charter	Meadow Glen – 2	GREEN Charter – 1
**Herpetology**	School of the Minds	Banks Trail	GREEN Charter – 2	GREEN Charter – 1
**Meteorology**	Irmo	E.P. Todd	Meadow Glen – 2	Mid Carolina
**Mystery Architecture**	Irmo	E.P. Todd	Meadow Glen – 2	Meadow Glen – 1
**Potions & Poisons**	Meadow Glen – 2	Pleasant Knoll	Chapin	Ben Lippen
**Road Scholar**	GREEN Charter – 2	Meadow Glen – 2	Banks Trail	Ben Lippen
**Roller Coaster**	Langston Charter	Meadow Glen – 1	Meadow Glen – 2	Mid Carolina
**Solar System**	Meadow Glen – 1	GREEN Charter – 1	Irmo	GREEN Charter – 2
**Thermodynamics**	Meadow Glen – 1	Meadow Glen – 2	Banks Trail	Ben Lippen
**Water Quality**	GREEN Charter – 1	Meadow Glen – 2	GREEN Charter – 2	Pleasant Knoll
**Write It Do It**	Chapin	Meadow Glen – 1	Ben Lippen	Pleasant Knoll
Winning team

Division B – final standings
Position	Team	Score
1	Irmo	109
2	Meadow Glen – 2	113
3	GREEN Charter – 1	134
4	Meadow Glen – 1	140
5	Chapin	142
6	Pleasant Knoll	151
7	Ben Lippen	191
7	Mid Carolina	191
9	Banks Trail	196
10	GREEN Charter – 2	202
11	E.P. Todd	207
12	Langston Charter	226
13	Newberry	250
14	School of the Minds	303

Division C – event placement
Event	First place	Second place	Third place	Fourth place
**Anatomy & Physiology**	Irmo	GREEN Charter	Spring Hill – 1	Spring Hill – 2
**Astronomy**	May River	Clinton	Dutch Fork	Chapin
**Boomilever**	GREEN Charter	May River	Oakbrook Prep	Irmo
**Chemistry Lab**	Chapin	Irmo	Dorman	Dutch Fork
**Circuit Lab**	Oakbrook Prep	Mid Carolina	Dutch Fork	Irmo
**Codebusters**	Irmo	J.L. Mann	May River	Oakbrook Prep
**Designer Genes**	Dutch Fork	May River	Irmo	Spring Hill – 1
**Disease Detectives**	Chapin	J.L. Mann	Oakbrook Prep	May River
**Dynamic Planet**	Spring Hill – 1	May River	J.L. Mann	Oakbrook Prep
**Experimental Design**	Clinton	Dutch Fork	Spring Hill – 1	Chapin
**Fermi Questions**	Dutch Fork	Oakbrook Prep	Spring Hill – 1	Clinton
**Forensics**	Clinton	Chapin	Dorman	GREEN Charter
**Fossils**	Clinton	May River	J.L. Mann	Chapin
**Geologic Mapping**	Clinton	Spring Hill – 1	Chapin	Oakbrook Prep
**Herpetology**	May River	Oakbrook Prep	Clinton	Chapin
**Mission Possible**	May River	Chapin	Irmo	Dutch Fork
**Mousetrap Vehicle**	May River	Irmo	Oakbrook Prep	Spring Hill – 1
**Protein Modeling**	Irmo	Spring Hill – 2	Spring Hill – 1	May River
**Sounds of Music**	Chapin	Spring Hill – 1	Dutch Fork	Irmo
**Thermodynamics**	Irmo	Spring Hill – 1	May River	Mid Carolina
**Water Quality**	Dutch Fork	Spring Hill – 1	Spring Hill – 2	Irmo
**Wright Stuff**	Clinton	GREEN Charter	May River	Chapin
**Write It, Do It**	Oakbrook Prep	Dorman	Chapin	Irmo
Winning team

Division C – final standings
Position	Team	Score
1	May River	101
2	Chapin	102
3	Irmo	107
4	Spring Hill – 1	108
5	Dutch Fork	116
6	Oakbrook Prep	139
7	Clinton	165
8	Spring Hill – 2	243
9	J.L. Mann	253
10	Mid Carolina	263
11	Dorman	269
12	GREEN Charter	289
13	Ben Lippen	354

==== Citadel Regional ====
Division B – event placement
Event	First place	Second place	Third place	Fourth place
**Anatomy & Physiology**	Clinton	PALS	—N/a	—N/a
**Battery Buggy**	Clinton	PALS	Morningside	Laing
**Boomilever**	Clinton	Laing	PALS	—N/a
**Circuit Lab**	Clinton	PALS	Laing	—N/a
**Crimebusters**	Clinton	PALS	Laing	Morningside
**Density Lab**	Clinton	PALS	—N/a	—N/a
**Disease Detectives**	Clinton	PALS	Laing	—N/a
**Dynamic Planet**	Clinton	PALS	Laing	—N/a
**Experimental Design**	PALS	Clinton	Laing	Bates
**Elastic Launch Glider**	Laing	PALS	Morningside	Clinton
**Fossils**	Clinton	PALS	—N/a	—N/a
**Game On**	PALS	Laing	Clinton	—N/a
**Heredity**	Clinton	PALS	Bates	—N/a
**Herpetology**	Clinton	Bates	Laing	PALS
**Meteorology**	Laing	Clinton	PALS	—N/a
**Mystery Architecture**	Laing	PALS	Morningside	Bates
**Potions & Poisons**	Clinton	PALS	Morningside	Laing
**Road Scholar**	PALS	Clinton	Laing	—N/a
**Roller Coaster**	Clinton	PALS	Morningside	—N/a
**Solar System**	Clinton	PALS	Morningside	Bates
**Thermodynamics**	Clinton	PALS	Laing	—N/a
**Water Quality**	Clinton	PALS	—N/a	—N/a
**Write It Do It**	Clinton	Bates	PALS	—N/a
Winning team

Division B – final standings
Position	Team	Score
1	Clinton	35
2	PALS	48
3	Laing	79
4	Morningside	102
5	Bates	104

Division C – event placement
Event	First place	Second place	Third place	Fourth place
**Anatomy & Physiology**	Bluffton	Scholars Academy	River Bluff – Platinum	Academic Magnet A
**Astronomy**	Academic Magnet A	Scholars Academy	GSSM	Bluffton
**Boomilever**	White Knoll	Academic Magnet A	Scholars Academy	Academic Magnet B
**Chemistry Lab**	Academic Magnet A	River Bluff – Gold	GSSM	White Knoll
**Circuit Lab**	Academic Magnet A	Academic Magnet B	River Bluff – Platinum	Scholars Academy
**Codebusters**	Scholars Academy	Academic Magnet A	Academic Magnet B	River Bluff – Platinum
**Designer Genes**	Academic Magnet A	Academic Magnet B	River Bluff – Gold	Bluffton
**Disease Detectives**	GSSM	River Bluff – Gold	River Bluff – Platinum	Academic Magnet A
**Dynamic Planet**	Scholars Academy	River Bluff – Gold	Academic Magnet A	Academic Magnet B
**Experimental Design**	Academic Magnet A	Academic Magnet B	River Bluff – Gold	White Knoll
**Fermi Questions**	River Bluff – Platinum	Academic Magnet A	Bluffton	Scholars Academy
**Forensics**	River Bluff – Platinum	Academic Magnet A	Bluffton	Scholars Academy
**Fossils**	Bluffton	Scholars Academy	River Bluff – Platinum	River Bluff – Gold
**Geologic Mapping**	River Bluff – Gold	Bluffton	Academic Magnet A	Academic Magnet B
**Herpetology**	Academic Magnet A	GSSM	Scholars Academy	River Bluff – Gold
**Mission Possible**	River Bluff – Gold	Bluffton	—N/a	—N/a
**Mousetrap Vehicle**	Bluffton	River Bluff – Platinum	Marion	Academic Magnet A
**Protein Modeling**	Academic Magnet B	Academic Magnet A	River Bluff – Gold	Scholars Academy
**Sounds of Music**	Academic Magnet A	Bluffton	River Bluff – Gold	Scholars Academy
**Thermodynamics**	Academic Magnet A	River Bluff – Gold	GSSM	White Knoll
**Water Quality**	Academic Magnet A	Scholars Academy	River Bluff – Platinum	Bluffton
**Wright Stuff**	Bluffton	Academic Magnet A	Marion	River Bluff – Platinum
**Write It, Do It**	Scholars Academy	River Bluff – Gold	Academic Magnet A	GSSM
Winning team

Division C – final standings
Position	Team	Score
1	Academic Magnet A	58
2	River Bluff – Gold	92
3	Bluffton	103
4	Scholars Academy	112
5	River Bluff – Platinum	133
6	Academic Magnet B	140
7	GSSM	157
8	White Knoll	187
9	Scholars Academy – 2	231
10	Marion	246
11	River Bluff – Albino	248
12	Charleston Charter	263

==== State Final ====
Division B – event placement
Event	First place	Second place	Third place	Fourth place
**Anatomy & Physiology**	Clinton	GREEN Charter A	Langston Charter	Irmo
**Battery Buggy**	Clinton	GREEN Charter A	PALS	E.P. Todd
**Boomilever**	GREEN Charter A	Clinton	GREEN Charter B	Langston Charter
**Circuit Lab**	Clinton	Meadow Glen A	Irmo	Langston Charter
**Crimebusters**	Clinton	Banks Trail	Ben Lippen	Meadow Glen A
**Density Lab**	Clinton	Banks Trail	Langston Charter	Irmo
**Disease Detectives**	Clinton	Meadow Glen B	PALS	GREEN Charter A
**Dynamic Planet**	GREEN Charter A	Clinton	Banks Trail	Meadow Glen B
**Experimental Design**	PALS	Banks Trail	Irmo	Meadow Glen B
**Elastic Launch Glider**	GREEN Charter B	GREEN Charter A	Langston Charter	Clinton
**Fossils**	Clinton	Banks Trail	Meadow Glen B	Meadow Glen A
**Game On**	PALS	Langston Charter	Meadow Glen B	Banks Trail
**Heredity**	Clinton	Irmo	GREEN Charter A	Langston Charter A
**Herpetology**	Clinton	Banks Trail	Ben Lippen	GREEN Charter A
**Meteorology**	Clinton	Meadow Glen B	GREEN Charter B	GREEN Charter A
**Mystery Architecture**	Irmo	Laing	Meadow Glen B	GREEN Charter A
**Potions & Poisons**	Clinton	Banks Trail	Meadow Glen B	PALS
**Road Scholar**	Clinton	PALS	Meadow Glen B	GREEN Charter A
**Roller Coaster**	GREEN Charter A	Langston Charter	Clinton	E.P. Todd
**Solar System**	Irmo	GREEN Charter A	Clinton	Laing
**Thermodynamics**	Clinton	Ben Lippen	Meadow Glen B	PALS
**Water Quality**	Clinton	GREEN Charter A	PALS	Langston Charter
**Write It Do It**	Irmo	Meadow Glen A	Clinton	Langston Charter
Winning team

Division B – final standings
Position	Team	Score
1	Clinton **(D)**	53
2	GREEN Charter A	111
3	PALS	127
4	Langston Charter	130
4	Irmo	130
6	Meadow Glen B	131
7	Banks Trail	136
8	Meadow Glen A	161
9	Laing	194
10	Ben Lippen	210
11	GREEN Charter B	212
12	E.P. Todd	219

Division C – event placement
Event	First place	Second place	Third place	Fourth place
**Anatomy & Physiology**	Scholar's Academy A	GREEN Charter	May River	Springhill A
**Astronomy**	Springhill A	Dutch Fork	Academic Magnet A	May River
**Boomilever**	GREEN Charter	May River	River Bluff	Oakbrook Prep
**Chemistry Lab**	Academic Magnet A	GSSM	Dutch Fork	River Bluff
**Circuit Lab**	GSSM	River Bluff	Academic Magnet A	Dutch Fork
**Codebusters**	J.L. Mann	Academic Magnet B	Scholar's Academy A	May River
**Designer Genes**	Dutch Fork	Springhill A	Chapin	Irmo
**Disease Detectives**	Academic Magnet A	Academic Magnet B	May River	GSSM
**Dynamic Planet**	Bluffton	GSSM	Oakbrook Prep	Scholar's Academy A
**Experimental Design**	Academic Magnet A	Dutch Fork	Irmo	Springhill B
**Fermi Questions**	Irmo	GSSM	Springhill A	GREEN Charter
**Forensics**	Chapin	Scholar's Academy A	Academic Magnet A	Springhill B
**Fossils**	GSSM	Bluffton	J.L. Mann	Springhill A
**Geologic Mapping**	GREEN Charter	J.L. Mann	Scholar's Academy	Oakbrook Prep
**Herpetology**	May River	Academic Magnet A	Bluffton	Dutch Fork
**Mission Possible**	Chapin	May River	Irmo	River Bluff
**Mousetrap Vehicle**	May River	GSSM	Marion	River Bluff
**Protein Modeling**	Springhill A	Irmo	Academic Magnet B	Academic Magnet A
**Sounds of Music**	Bluffton	Academic Magnet A	Academic Magnet B	GSSM
**Thermodynamics**	Scholar's Academy A	May River	Academic Magnet A	Springhill A
**Water Quality**	River Bluff	Springhill A	Springhill B	Academic Magnet A
**Wright Stuff**	Bluffton	Dutch Fork	Chapin	Academic Magnet A
**Write It, Do It**	Scholar's Academy A	Springhill B	Academic Magnet B	Irmo
Winning team

Division C – final standings
Position	Team	Score
1	Academic Magnet A	118
2	May River	154
3	Spring Hill A	155
4	River Bluff	158
5	Dutch Fork	162
6	Bluffton	174
7	Chapin	180
8	GSSM	183
9	Scholar's Academy A	187
10	Irmo	196
11	Academic Magnet B	210
12	Oakbrook Prep	244
13	GREEN Charter	255
14	Spring Hill B	259
15	J.L. Mann	292
16	Marion	350
17	Scholar's Academy B	399
18	Ben Lippen	429

=== 2018 Competition ===
Division B – event placement
Event	First place	Second place	Third place	Fourth Place
**Anatomy and Physiology**	GREEN Charter A	Mid-Carolina	Clinton A	Chesnee B
**Battery Buggy**	Clinton B	Chesnee B	Clinton A	PALS
**Crimebusters**	Pleasant Knoll	GREEN Charter A	Irmo A	Robert Smalls
**Disease Detectives**	Clinton A	Irmo A	Meadow Glen A	PALS
**Dynamic Planet**	Banks Trail	Irmo B	Chesnee	Irmo A
**Ecology**	Clinton A	Meadow Glen A	Clinton B	GREEN Charter A
**Experimental Design**	Clinton A	PALS	Banks Trail	GREEN Charter A
**Fast Facts**	GREEN Charter A	Clinton A	Irmo A	Ben Lippen
**Herpetology**	Clinton A	Robert Smalls	Banks Trail	Clinton B
**Meteorology**	Irmo B	Clinton A	Ben Lippen	Meadow Glen A
**Mystery Architecture**	Clinton A	Ben Lippen	Banks Trail	D.R. Hill / Mid-Carolina (Tie)
**Optics**	Clinton B	Clinton A	Mid-Carolina	GREEN Charter A
**Potions and Poisons**	Irmo A	GREEN Charter A	Clinton A	Pleasant Knoll
**Road Scholar**	Meadow Glen A	Clinton A	GREEN Charter A	Chesnee A
**Rocks and Minerals**	GREEN Charter A	Clinton A	GREEN Charter B	Clinton B
**Roller Coaster**	GREEN Charter A	Langston Charter	School of the Minds	Pleasant Knoll
**Solar System**	GREEN Charter A	Banks Trail	Clinton A	GREEN Charter B
**Towers**	Clinton A	GREEN Charter B	Clinton B	GREEN Charter A
**Wright Stuff**	Clinton B	PALS	Clinton A	GREEN Charter A
**Write It Do It**	Irmo A	GREEN Charter B	Batesburg-Leesville	Clinton A
Sportsmanship Award: Pleasant Knoll
Winning team

Division B – final standings
Position	Team	Score
1	Clinton **(D)**	63
2	GREEN Charter	91
3	Meadow Glen	122
4	Irmo	143
5	Banks Trail	144
6	PALS	154
7	Pleasant Knoll	157
8	Mid Carolina	184
9	Robert Smalls Int'l Academy	208
10	Ben Lippen	212
11	Chesnee	229
12	Batesburg-Leesville	233
13	Newberry	258
14	D.R. Hill	339
15	School of the Minds	346
16	Bates	389
16	Langston Charter	389
18	St. James-Santee	422

Division C – event placement
Event	First place	Second place	Third place	Fourth Place
**Anatomy and Physiology**	Scholars' Academy	Academic Magnet A	Dorman	Irmo
**Astronomy**	Dorman	Academic Magnet A	Clinton	Spring Hill
**Chemistry Lab**	Dutch Fork	Dorman	Chapin	Oakbrook Prep
**Disease Detectives**	Academic Magnet A	May River	Chapin	Spring Hill
**Dynamic Planet**	Academic Magnet A	Dutch Fork	Bluffton	Chapin
**Ecology**	J.L. Mann	Dorman	Spring Hill	Academic Magnet A
**Experimental Design**	Dutch Fork	Dorman	Clinton	Saluda
**Fast Facts**	Chapin	Dorman	J.L. Mann	May River
**Fermi Questions**	Oakbrook Prep	Academic Magnet A	Academic Magnet B	Clinton
**Forensics**	Clinton	May River	Oakbrook Prep	Irmo
**Helicopters**	Clinton	Academic Magnet A	May River	Bluffton
**Herpetology**	May River	Irmo	Bluffton	Scholars' Academy
**Mission Possible**	Clinton	Dorman	Dutch Fork	J.L. Mann
**Mousetrap Vehicle**	Clinton	Irmo	Dorman	J.L. Mann
**Optics**	Oakbrook Prep	Spring Hill	Clinton	Academic Magnet A
**Remote Sensing**	Bluffton	Clinton	Spring Hill	Dutch Fork
**Rocks and Minerals**	Clinton	Academic Magnet A	J.L. Mann	Dorman
**Thermodynamics**	May River	Spring Hill	Irmo	Chapin
**Towers**	Clinton	May River	J.L. Mann	Carolina
**Write It, Do It**	Chapin	Oakbrook Prep	River Bluff	Clinton
Sportsmanship Award: White Knoll
Winning team

Division C – event placement
Position	Team	Score
1	Clinton **(D)**	90
2	May River	117
3	Academic Magnet	121
4	Chapin	139
5	Spring Hill	144
6	Dorman	151
7	Irmo	166
8	Dutch Fork	169
9	Bluffton	170
10	River Bluff	193
11	J.L. Mann	203
11	Oakbrook Prep	203
13	Scholars' Academy	249
14	White Knoll	258
15	Carolina	281
16	Mid-Carolina	298
17	Swansea	332
18	Saluda	342
19	Ben Lippen	359
20	Charleston Charter	455

=== 2017 Competition ===
Division B – event placement
Event	First place	Second place	Third place	Fourth Place
**Anatomy and Physiology**	Robert Smalls	GREEN Charter	Gold Hill A	Clinton A
**Crime Busters**	Clinton A	GREEN Charter	PALS A	Ben Lippen
**Disease Detectives**	Clinton A	Gold Hill A	Meadow Glen A	PALS A
**Dynamic Planet**	Gold Hill A	Gold Hill B	Clinton B	Clinton A
**Ecology**	Clinton A	Meadow Glen A	Banks Trail A	Daniel Island
**Experimental Design**	Clinton A	Daniel Island	Gold Hill A	Hand A
**Fast Facts**	Pine Ridge	Clinton B	Clinton A	GREEN Charter
**Food Science**	PALS B	GREEN Charter	Meadow Glen A	Irmo A
**Invasive Species**	Clinton A	Meadow Glen A	Gold Hill A	Ben Lippen
**Meteorology**	Clinton A	Gold Hill B	Meadow Glen A	Irmo A
**Optics**	Clinton A	GREEN Charter	Chesnee A	Meadow Glen A
**Reach for the Stars**	GREEN Charter	Clinton A	Meadow Glen A	Clinton B
**Rocks and Minerals**	Clinton A	Meadow Glen A	GREEN Charter	Pine Ridge
**Scrambler**	Clinton B	Clinton A	Gold Hill A	Daniel Island
**Towers**	GREEN Charter	Clinton B	Clinton A	Banks Trail A
**Wright Stuff**	GREEN Charter	Clinton A	Clinton B	PALS B
**Write It, Do It**	Meadow Glen A	Clinton A	PALS A	Clinton B
Sportsmanship Award: Meadow Glen
Winning team

Division B – final standings
Position	Team	Score
1	Clinton **(D)**	37
2	Meadow Glen	77
3	GREEN Charter	109
4	Banks Trail	130
5	Gold Hill	150
6	PALS	166
7	Irmo	185
8	Pine Ridge	195
9	Boiling Springs	208
10	Newberry	229
11	Hand	236
12	Mid-Carolina	241
13	Daniel Island	269
13	Ben Lippen	269
15	Robert Smalls Int'l Academy	339
16	Batesburg-Leesville	341
17	Chesnee	357
18	Gaffney	410
19	Pleasant Hill	413
20	Bates	419
21	D.R. Hill	422

Division C – event placement
Event	First place	Second place	Third place	Fourth Place
**Anatomy and Physiology**	Scholar's Academy	Academic Magnet A	J.L. Mann A	May River
**Astronomy**	Clinton A	Academic Magnet A	Spring Hill A	Dorman
**Chemistry Lab**	Dorman	Academic Magnet A	Academic Magnet B	Scholar's Academy
**Disease Detectives**	Chapin	Irmo A	Academic Magnet A	Dorman
**Dynamic Planet**	Clinton A	Spring Hill B	Academic Magnet A	J.L. Mann A
**Ecology**	J.L. Mann A	Chapin	Clinton A	Dorman
**Electric Vehicle**	Clinton A	Midland Valley	Chapin A	Clinton B
**Experimental Design**	Clinton A	Dorman	Chapin	Saluda
**Forensics**	Clinton A	Irmo A	Academic Magnet A	Irmo B
**Helicopters**	Clinton A	Bluffton A	May River	Spring Hill A
**Invasive Species**	Academic Magnet A	May River	Clinton A	Academic Magnet B
**Materials Science**	Academic Magnet A	Clinton A	J.L. Mann A	Scholar's Academy
**Microbe Mission**	J.L. Mann B	J.L. Mann A	May River	Bluffton B
**Optics**	Oakbrook Prep	Dutch Fork A	Clinton A	Scholar's Academy
**Pentathlon**	Dutch Fork A	Clinton A	Academic Magnet A	Chapin
**Remote Sensing**	Clinton A	Academic Magnet A	Bluffton A	Clinton B
**Robot Arm**	Clinton A	Dutch Fork A	Carolina	Irmo A
**Rocks and Minerals**	Clinton A	J.L. Mann A	May River	Dutch Fork A
**Towers**	Clinton A	May River	Carolina	Oakbrook Prep
**Write It, Do It**	Clinton B	Academic Magnet A	Chapin	Oakbrook Prep
Sportsmanship Award: Bluffton
Winning team

Division C – final standings
Position	Team	Score
1	Clinton **(D)**	59
2	Academic Magnet	91
3	May River	125
4	Dutch Fork	143
5	Chapin	144
6	J.L. Mann	150
7	Dorman	153
8	Spring Hill	160
9	Bluffton	162
10	Irmo	171
11	Scholar's Academy	184
12	Carolina	216
13	Midland Valley	270
14	Mid-Carolina	296
15	Swansea	299
16	Oakbrook Prep	319
17	Saluda	327
18	Marion	377
19	Coastal Leadership Academy	394

=== 2016 Competition ===
Division B – event placement
Event	First place	Second place	Third place	Fourth Place
**Air Trajectory**	PALS A	Clinton A	Clinton B	Mid-Carolina A
**Anatomy & Physiology**	GREEN Charter	Meadow Glen A	Clinton A	Meadow Glen B
**Bio-Process Lab**	Newberry	Clinton A	Meadow Glen A	Mid-Carolina A
**Bridge Building**	Clinton A	Banks Trail B	Clinton B	Mid-Carolina A
**Crave the Wave**	Clinton A	PALS A	Irmo	Mid-Carolina A
**Crime Busters**	McCracken	Clinton A	Pine Ridge	Newberry
**Disease Detectives**	Clinton A	Gold Hill	Irmo	Mid-Carolina A
**Dynamic Planet**	Clinton A	Gold Hill	Mid-Carolina A	Meadow Glen A
**Elastic Launch Glider**	Mid-Carolina B	Mid-Carolina A	Clinton A	GREEN Charter
**Experimental Design**	Clinton A	Meadow Glen B	McCracken	Gold Hill
**Food Science**	Meadow Glen A	Banks Trail A	Dutch Fork	Clinton A
**Fossils**	Clinton A	Clinton B	Palmetto A	Pine Ridge
**Green Generation**	Clinton A	McCracken	Meadow Glen A	PALS
**Invasive Species**	Clinton A	Meadow Glen A	Meadow Glen B	Clinton B
**Meteorology**	Clinton A	Holly Hill-Roberts	Gold Hill	Meadow Glen B
**Picture This**	Meadow Glen B	Clinton A	Palmetto A	Mid-Carolina A
**Reach for the Stars**	Clinton A	Banks Trail A	GREEN Charter	Clinton B
**Road Scholar**	Meadow Glen B	Clinton A	Banks Trail A	McCracken
**Scrambler**	Clinton A	GREEN Charter	Clinton B	Gold Hill
**Write It, Do It**	Mid-Carolina A	Dutch Fork	Newberry	Clinton B
Sportsmanship Award: Gold Hill
Winning team

Division B – final standings
Position	Team	Score
1	Clinton **(D)**	40
2	Mid-Carolina	109
3	Banks Trail	153
4	Gold Hill	154
5	Meadow Glen	157
6	PALS	162
7	McCracken	166
8	Irmo	170
9	Palmetto	182
10	Pine Ridge	190
11	Newberry	195
12	GREEN Charter	205
13	Stover	306
14	Dutch Fork	322
15	Boiling Springs	337
16	Ben Lippen	347
17	Guinyard Butler	355
18	CrossRoads	368
19	Daniel Island	386
20	Holly Hill-Roberts	388

Division C – event placement
Event	First place	Second place	Third place	Fourth Place
**Air Trajectory**	Carolina	Ben Lippen	Academic Magnet A	Clinton A
**Anatomy & Physiology**	Clinton A	J.L. Mann B	Academic Magnet A	Irmo
**Astronomy**	Clinton A	Academic Magnet A	Dorman B	Clinton B
**Bridge Building**	Clinton A	Scholar's Academy	Carolina	J.L. Mann B
**Cell Biology**	Academic Magnet A	Academic Magnet B	Dutch Fork A	Irmo
**Chemistry Lab**	Academic Magnet B	Academic Magnet A	Spring Hill	Ben Lippen
**Disease Detectives**	Dorman A	Dutch Fork A	Scholar's Academy	J.L. Mann B
**Dynamic Planet**	Clinton A	Dorman B	Academic Magnet A	Scholar's Academy
**Electric Vehicle**	Clinton A	Coastal Leadership Academy	Chapin	Ben Lippen
**Experimental Design**	Clinton A	Academic Magnet B	Clinton B	Chapin
**Forensics**	Chapin	Clinton B	Spring Hill	Academic Magnet A
**Fossils**	Clinton A	J.L. Mann A	McCracken	Spring Hill
**Game On**	Dutch Fork A	Dutch Fork B	Academic Magnet A	McCracken
**Geologic Mapping**	Clinton A	Academic Magnet A	Irmo	Scholar's Academy
**Green Generation**	Academic Magnet A	J.L. Mann A	Dorman B	Dutch Fork B
**Invasive Species**	Academic Magnet B	Clinton A	Academic Magnet A	Dorman A
**Robot Arm**	Clinton A	Ben Lippen	Academic Magnet A	Irmo
**Wright Stuff**	Clinton A	Clinton B	Academic Magnet A	J.L. Mann B
**Write It, Do It**	Clinton A	Academic Magnet A	Dorman B	Scholar's Academy
Sportsmanship Award: Spring Hill
Winning team

Division C – final standings
Position	Team	Score
1	Clinton	58
2	Academic Magnet **(D)**	69
3	Spring Hill	132
4	Irmo	149
5	McCracken	158
6	Chapin	160
7	Dutch Fork	177
8	Carolina	180
9	Dorman	187
10	Ben Lippen	188
11	Scholar's Academy	190
12	J.L. Mann	199
13	Midland Valley	257
14	East Clarendon	261
15	Coastal Leadership Academy	316
16	Marion	333

=== 2015 Competition ===
Both winners represented South Carolina at the 2015 Science Olympiad National Tournament, held at the University of Nebraska–Lincoln. Competition took place on May 15–16, 2015.

Division B – event placement
Event	First place	Second place	Third place	Fourth Place
**Anatomy & Physiology**	Gold Hill A	McCracken	Bell Street A	Banks Trail A
**Bio-Process Lab**	McCracken	Bell Street A	Banks Trail A	Gold Hill B
**Bridge Building**	Holly Hill-Roberts	Bell Street A	PALS A	Pine Ridge
**Can't Judge a Powder**	McCracken	Banks Trail A	Mid-Carolina	Banks Trail B
**Crave the Wave**	Bell Street A	Banks Trail A	Gold Hill A	Bell Street B
**Crime Busters**	Charleston Charter B	Dutch Fork	Bell Street A	McCracken
**Disease Detectives**	Bell Street A	Newberry	Gold Hill A	McCracken
**Dynamic Planet**	Bell Street A	PALS A	Mid-Carolina	Bell Street B
**Elastic Launched Glider**	Bell Street A	Charleston Charter A	Bell Street B	Banks Trail A
**Entomology**	Bell Street A	Banks Trail A	Bell Street B	Irmo
**Experimental Design**	Bell Street A	McCracken	Gold Hill A	Bell Street B
**Fossils**	Bell Street A	McCracken	Banks Trail	Bell Street B
**Green Generation**	Bell Street A	McCracken	Banks Trail A	Gold Hill A
**Meteorology**	McCracken	Bell Street A	Meadow Glen	Mid-Carolina
**Picture This**	Stover	Bell Street B	PALS B	PALS A
**Road Scholar**	Bell Street A	Irmo	Bell Street B	Pine Ridge
**Robo-Cross**	PALS A	Bell Street A	Mid-Carolina	Bell Street B
**Solar System**	Bell Street A	Gold Hill A	GREEN Charter A	Bell Street B
**Wheeled Vehicle**	Bell Street A	PALS A	Pine Ridge	Bell Street B
**Write It, Do It**	Mid-Carolina	GREEN Charter A	Gold Hill A	Bell Street B
Sportsmanship Award: McCracken
Winning team

Division B – final standings
Position	Team	Score
1	Bell Street **(D)**	41
2	McCracken	92
3	Banks Trail	120
4	PALS	133
5	Gold Hill	141
6	Meadow Glen	146
7	Palmetto	148
8	Mid-Carolina	152
9	Newberry	163
10	Irmo	166
11	Pine Ridge	180
12	GREEN Charter	191
13	Dutch Fork	278
14	Stover	284
15	Charleston Charter	302
16	Holly-Hill Roberts	308

Division C – event placement
Event	First place	Second place	Third place	Fourth Place
**Anatomy & Physiology**	Clinton	Dorman B	Irmo A	Academic Magnet A
**Astronomy**	Clinton	Academic Magnet B	Dorman A	Spring Hill
**Bridge Building**	Clinton	Dutch Fork A	Dorman A	Academic Magnet B
**Cell Biology**	Academic Magnet A	Academic Magnet B	Irmo A	Spring Hill
**Chemistry Lab**	Ben Lippen	Dorman A	Academic Magnet B	Dutch Fork A
**Disease Detectives**	Irmo A	Dutch Fork A	Dorman B	Academic Magnet A
**Dynamic Planet**	Clinton	Irmo A	Dutch Fork A	Academic Magnet A
**Entomology**	Clinton	Academic Magnet A	Dorman A	Dutch Fork A
**Experimental Design**	Academic Magnet A	Irmo A	Academic Magnet B	Dutch Fork A
**Forensics**	Academic Magnet A	Ben Lippen	East Clarendon	Clinton
**Fossils**	Clinton	Academic Magnet A	Academic Magnet B	Dorman B
**Geologic Mapping**	Clinton	Irmo A	Academic Magnet A	Bluffton B
**Green Generation**	Dutch Fork A	Academic Magnet A	Dorman A	Bluffton A
**It's About Time**	Dorman A	Irmo B	Coastal Leadership	Clinton
**Mission Possible**	Spring Hill	Dorman A	Dutch Fork A	Clinton
**Picture This**	Irmo A	Spring Hill	Academic Magnet A	Dorman A
**Protein Modeling**	Academic Magnet B	Spring Hill	Irmo A	Academic Magnet A
**Scrambler**	Clinton	Coastal Leadership	Dutch Fork A	Irmo A
**Wright Stuff**	Academic Magnet A	Irmo A	Dorman A	Ben Lippen
**Write It, Do It**	Clinton	Chapin	Dorman B	Dutch Fork A
Sportsmanship Award: Coastal Leadership Academy
Winning team

Division C – final standings
Position	Team	Score
1	Academic Magnet	76
2	Irmo	78
3	Clinton **(D)**	81
4	Dorman	97
5	Dutch Fork	104
6	Spring Hill	146
6	Bluffton	146
8	Ben Lippen	208
9	Coastal Leadership Academy	230
10	Chapin	235
11	East Clarendon	253
12	Carolina	263
13	Midland Valley	265
14	Wilson	288
15	Strom Thurmond	305
16	Charleston Charter	317

=== 2014 Competition ===
Division B – event placement
Event	First place	Second place	Third place	Fourth Place
**Anatomy**	Cario	McCracken	Bell Street A	Kelly Mill
**Boomilever**	Bell Street A	Bell Street B	Irmo	PALS A
**Can't Judge a Powder**	Bell Street A	McCracken	Bell Street B	Mid-Carolina
**Crime Busters**	Pine Ridge	McCracken	Bell Street B	Cario
**Disease Detectives**	Cario	Meadow Glen	PALS A	Palmetto
**Dynamic Planet**	Bell Street A	McCracken	Cario	Dutch Fork
**Entomology**	Bell Street A	McCracken	Meadow Glen	Dutch Fork
**Heredity**	Cario	Bell Street A	Meadow Glen	Bell Street B
**Metric Mastery**	Cario	McCracken	Gold Hill	Meadow Glen
**Road Scholar**	Bell Street A	Meadow Glen	Banks Trail	McCracken
**Robo-Cross**	Meadow Glen	Bell Street B	Palmetto	Bell Street A
**Rocks and Minerals**	Bell Street A	Banks Trail	Bell Street B	McCracken
**Rotor Egg Drop**	Bell Street A	Meadow Glen	Cario	Palmetto
**Shock Value**	Bell Street A	Meadow Glen	Bell Street B	Irmo
**Simple Machines**	Dutch Fork	Cario	Gold Hill	Bell Street A
**Solar System**	Gold Hill	Bell Street A	Meadow Glen	McCracken
**Sounds of Music**	Bell Street A	Cario	Gold Hill	Meadow Glen
**Water Quality**	Bell Street B	Bell Street A	McCracken	Palmetto
**Wheeled Vehicle**	Bell Street A	Bell Street B	Cario	PALS A
**Write It, Do It**	Bell Street A	Gold Hill	Irmo	Palmetto
Sportsmanship Award: Cario
Winning team

Division B – final standings
Position	Team	Score
1	Bell Street **(D)**	47
2	Meadow Glen	88
3	Cario	94
4	McCracken	111
5	Gold Hill	143
6	Palmetto	156
7	PALS	157
8	Irmo	165
9	Mid-Carolina	172
T-10	Dutch Fork	173
T-10	Pine Ridge	173
12	Banks Trail	183
13	Francis Mack	240
14	Kelly Mill	265

Division C – event placement
Event	First place	Second place	Third place	Fourth Place
**Anatomy & Physiology**	Clinton	Dorman A	Irmo C	Dutch Fork B
**Astronomy**	Spring Hill	Dorman A	Dutch Fork A	Irmo A
**Boomilever**	Irmo A	Irmo B	Carolina	Clinton
**Chemistry Lab**	Academic Magnet	Dutch Fork A	Dorman A	Chapin
**Circuit Lab**	Academic Magnet	Dorman A	Clinton	Bluffton A
**Compound Machines**	Irmo A	Academic Magnet	Ben Lippen	Carolina
**Designer Genes**	Clinton	Irmo B	Dorman A	Irmo A
**Disease Detectives**	Dorman B	Academic Magnet	Bluffton A	Clinton
**Dynamic Planet**	Clinton	Irmo A	Academic Magnet	Dutch Fork A
**Entomology**	Clinton	Irmo A	Dorman A	Dutch Fork B
**Experimental Design**	Clinton	Dutch Fork A	Academic Magnet	Dorman A
**Forensics**	Academic Magnet	Clinton	Bluffton A	Dutch Fork A
**Geologic Mapping**	Clinton	Dutch Fork A	Chapin	Dorman A
**Materials Science**	Dorman A	Clinton	Dorman B	Bluffton A
**Mission Possible**	Dutch Fork A	Clinton	Academic Magnet	Irmo A
**Rocks & Minerals**	Clinton	Academic Magnet	Bluffton A	Chapin
**Scrambler**	Clinton	Irmo A	East Clarendon	Coastal Leadership
**Technical Problem Solving**	Academic Magnet	Ben Lippen	Irmo A	Dorman A
**Water Quality**	Dorman A	Chapin	Dutch Fork A	Dutch Fork B
**Write It, Do It**	Dutch Fork B	Bluffton A	Dorman A	Spring Hill
Sportsmanship Award: East Clarendon
Winning team

Division C – final standings
Position	Team	Score
1	Clinton **(D)**	58
2	Academic Magnet	85
3	Dutch Fork	97
4	Dorman	99
5	Irmo	106
6	Chapin	122
7	Bluffton	134
8	Carolina	173
9	Spring Hill	195
10	Coastal Leadership Academy	203
11	East Clarendon	236
12	Ben Lippen	243
13	Midland Valley	246
14	Swansea	219
15	Lower Richland	326
