= Irmo =

Irmo may refer to:

- Irmo, South Carolina, a town in South Carolina, USA
- Irmo High School, a high school in the town
- Lórien (Vala), a character in the writings of J. R. R. Tolkien who is also named Irmo
