= Lake Murray of Richland, South Carolina =

Lake Murray of Richland
- Census-designated place
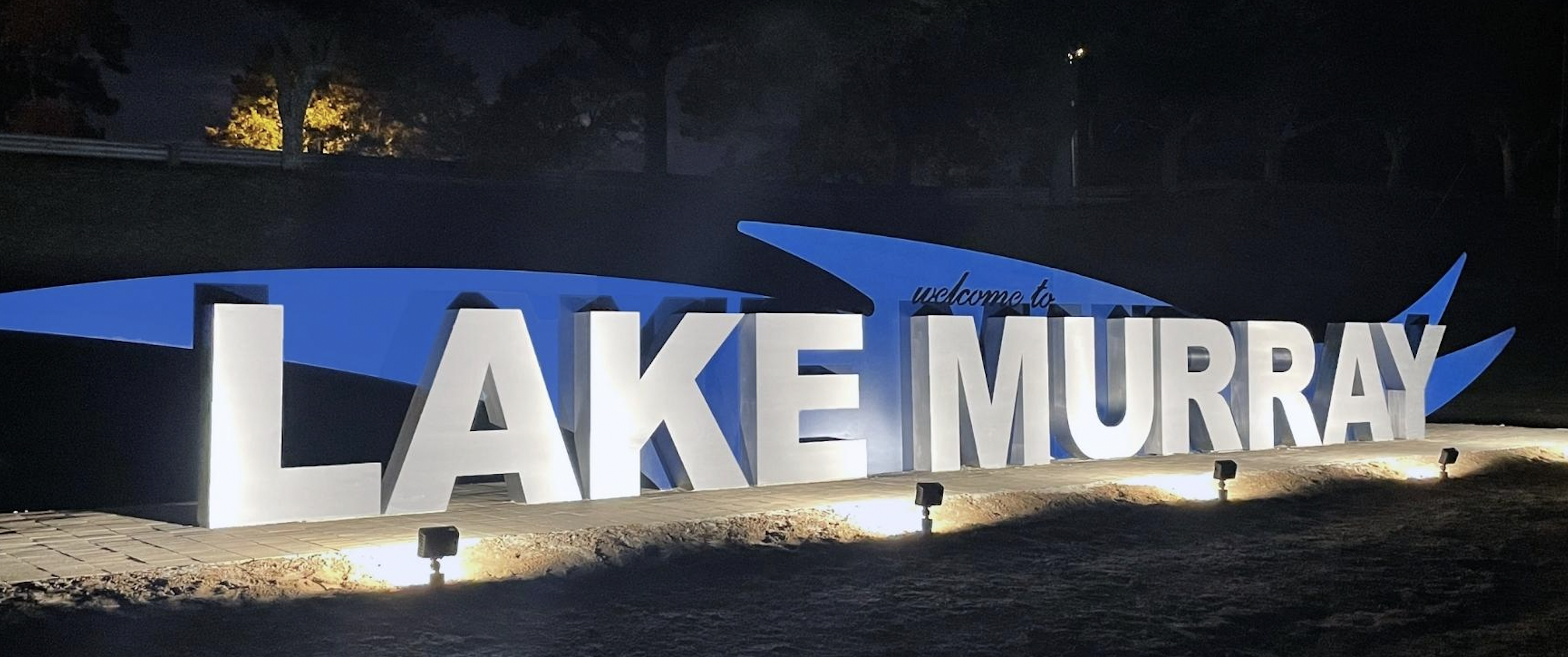

- Location in Richland County and the state of South Carolina.
- Coordinates: 34°07′30″N 81°15′44″W
- Country: United States
- State: South Carolina
- County: Richland

Area
  - Total: 8.68 sq mi (22.47 km^{2})
  - Land: 5.56 sq mi (14.40 km^{2})
  - Water: 3.11 sq mi (8.06 km^{2})
- Elevation: 374 ft (114 m)

Population (2020)
  - Total: 8,110
  - Density: 1,458.2/sq mi (563.03/km^{2})
- Time zone: UTC-5 (Eastern (EST))
  - Summer (DST): UTC-4 (EDT)
- Postal codes: 29036 (Chapin), 29063 (Irmo), 29177 (White Rock)
- FIPS code: 45-39475
- GNIS feature ID: 2403200

Lake Murray of Richland is a census-designated place (CDP) in Richland County, South Carolina, United States, named for its proximity to Lake Murray. The population was 8,110 at the 2020 census. It is part of the Columbia, South Carolina metropolitan area.

== Geography ==
According to the United States Census Bureau, the CDP has a total area of 8.7 square miles (22.5 km^{2}), of which 5.6 square miles (14.5 km^{2}) is land and 3.1 square miles (8.1 km^{2}), or 35.80%, is water.

== Demographics ==
Historical population
Census	Pop.	Note	%±
2000	3,526		—
2010	5,484		55.5%
2020	8,110		47.9%
U.S. Decennial Census

=== Racial and ethnic composition ===
Lake Murray of Richland CDP, South Carolina – Racial and ethnic composition Note: the US Census treats Hispanic/Latino as an ethnic category. This table excludes Latinos from the racial categories and assigns them to a separate category. Hispanics/Latinos may be of any race.
Race / Ethnicity (NH = Non-Hispanic)	Pop 2000	Pop 2010	Pop 2020	% 2000	% 2010	% 2020
White alone (NH)	3,420	5,203	6,876	96.99%	94.88%	84.78%
Black or African American alone (NH)	30	74	464	0.85%	1.35%	5.72%
Native American or Alaska Native alone (NH)	2	10	8	0.06%	0.18%	0.10%
Asian alone (NH)	30	62	214	0.85%	1.13%	2.64%
Native Hawaiian or Pacific Islander alone (NH)	0	0	3	0.00%	0.00%	0.04%
Other race alone (NH)	0	7	22	0.00%	0.13%	0.27%
Mixed race or Multiracial (NH)	11	35	272	0.31%	0.64%	3.35%
Hispanic or Latino (any race)	33	93	251	0.94%	1.70%	3.09%
Total	3,526	5,484	8,110	100.00%	100.00%	100.00%

=== 2020 census ===
As of the 2020 United States census, there were 8,110 people, 2,495 households, and 1,909 families residing in the CDP.

=== 2000 census ===
As of the census of 2000, there were 3,526 people, 1,251 households, and 982 families residing in the CDP. The population density was 613.0 inhabitants per square mile (236.7/km^{2}). There were 1,353 housing units at an average density of 235.2 per square mile (90.8/km^{2}). The racial makeup of the CDP was 97.82% White, 0.85% African American, 0.06% Native American, 0.85% Asian, 0.09% from other races, and 0.34% from two or more races. Hispanic or Latino of any race were 0.94% of the population.

There were 1,251 households, out of which 31.2% had children under the age of 18 living with them, 72.1% were married couples living together, 4.2% had a female householder with no husband present, and 21.5% were non-families. 19.2% of all households were made up of individuals, and 7.8% had someone living alone who was 65 years of age or older. The average household size was 2.46 and the average family size was 2.80.

In the CDP, the population was spread out, with 19.2% under the age of 18, 3.3% from 18 to 24, 21.8% from 25 to 44, 31.0% from 45 to 64, and 24.7% who were 65 years of age or older. The median age was 48 years. For every 100 females, there were 86.2 males. For every 100 females age 18 and over, there were 84.7 males.

The median income for a household in the CDP was $73,875, and the median income for a family was $90,753. Males had a median income of $66,838 versus $36,406 for females. The per capita income for the CDP was $35,083. About 0.8% of families and 1.6% of the population were below the poverty line, including 2.4% of those under age 18 and 4.5% of those age 65 or over.
