= Devontae Shuler =

American basketball player (born 1998)

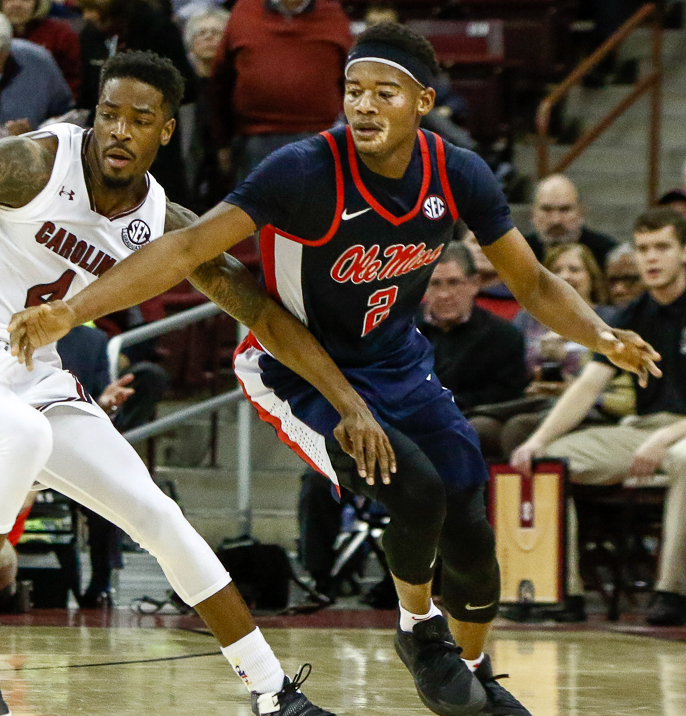
- Shuler (right) with Ole Miss in 2019

No. 6 – San Diego Clippers
- Position: Shooting guard
- League: NBA G League

Personal information
- Born: February 9, 1998 (age 28) Irmo, South Carolina, U.S.
- Listed height: 6 ft 2 in (1.88 m)
- Listed weight: 185 lb (84 kg)

Career information
- High school: Irmo (Columbia, South Carolina); Oak Hill Academy (Mouth of Wilson, Virginia)
- College: Ole Miss (2017–2021)
- NBA draft: 2021: undrafted
- Playing career: 2021–present

Career history
- 2021–2022: Capital City Go-Go
- 2023: Fort Wayne Mad Ants
- 2023–2024: Cleveland Charge
- 2024–2025: Filou Oostende
- 2025–present: San Diego Clippers

Career highlights
- First-team All-SEC – Coaches (2021)
- Stats at NBA.com
- Stats at Basketball Reference

Devontae Shuler (born February 9, 1998) is an American professional basketball player for the San Diego Clippers of the NBA G League. He played college basketball for the Ole Miss Rebels.

== High school career ==
As a sophomore, Shuler averaged 25.5 points per game for Irmo High School in Columbia, South Carolina and led his team to the Class 4A lower state title game. He played alongside Zion Williamson and Ja Morant with the South Carolina Hornets Amateur Athletic Union program. After the season, he transferred to Oak Hill Academy in Mouth of Wilson, Virginia. Shuler helped his team win the High School National title as a junior. In his senior season, Shuler averaged 15.3 points, 4.3 rebounds, 4.1 assists and 3.7 steals per game. A four-star recruit, he committed to playing college basketball for Ole Miss over offers from South Carolina, Oklahoma State and Miami (Florida).

== College career ==
As a freshman at Ole Miss, Shuler averaged six points, 2.7 rebounds and 1.1 assists per game, primarily playing off the ball alongside Breein Tyree. He decided to return to the team despite a coaching change after the season, after meeting with new coach Kermit Davis. Shuler moved into a starting role and averaged 10.3 points, 4.1 rebounds and three assists per game as a sophomore. He recorded 56 steals, the most ever by an Ole Miss sophomore and the seventh-most in program history. Shuler declared for the 2019 NBA draft before returning to college. On February 1, 2020, he scored a junior season-high 28 points along with five three-pointers in a 73–63 loss to LSU. As a junior, Shuler averaged 11.7 points, 4.5 rebounds and 3.3 assists per game. He averaged 15.3 points and 3.3 assists per game as a senior, earning First Team All-SEC honors.

== Professional career ==
=== Capital City Go-Go (2021–2022) ===
After going undrafted in the 2021 NBA draft, Shuler joined the Dallas Mavericks for 2021 NBA Summer League. On October 15, 2021, he signed with the Washington Wizards. Shuler was waived on October 16. In October 2021, he joined the Capital City Go-Go as an affiliate player. On December 29, 2022, Shuler was waived.

=== Fort Wayne Mad Ants (2023) ===
On January 15, 2023, Shuler was acquired by the Fort Wayne Mad Ants. He was waived on February 8.

=== Cleveland Charge (2023–2024) ===
On February 13, 2023, Shuler was acquired by the Cleveland Charge.

On October 21, 2023, Shuler signed with the Cleveland Cavaliers, but was waived the same day, and one week later, he re-signed with the Charge.

=== Filou Oostende (2024–2025) ===
On October 1, 2024, Shuler signed with Filou Oostende of the BNXT League.

== Career statistics ==
Legend
| GP | Games played | GS | Games started | MPG | Minutes per game |
| FG% | Field goal percentage | 3P% | 3-point field goal percentage | FT% | Free throw percentage |
| RPG | Rebounds per game | APG | Assists per game | SPG | Steals per game |
| BPG | Blocks per game | PPG | Points per game | **Bold** | Career high |

=== College ===
| Year | Team | GP | GS | MPG | FG% | 3P% | FT% | RPG | APG | SPG | BPG | PPG |
|---|---|---|---|---|---|---|---|---|---|---|---|---|
| 2017–18 | Ole Miss | 32 | 9 | 18.8 | .352 | .259 | .750 | 2.7 | 1.1 | 1.0 | .1 | 6.0 |
| 2018–19 | Ole Miss | **33** | 31 | 32.2 | **.458** | **.402** | **.823** | 4.2 | 3.0 | **1.7** | .2 | 10.3 |
| 2019–20 | Ole Miss | 32 | **32** | **33.1** | .423 | .355 | .626 | **4.5** | **3.3** | **1.7** | **.3** | 11.7 |
| 2020–21 | Ole Miss | 27 | 27 | 32.8 | .409 | .340 | .766 | 3.0 | **3.3** | 1.6 | .1 | **15.3** |
| Career | | 124 | 99 | 29.1 | .413 | .340 | .725 | 3.6 | 2.7 | 1.5 | .2 | 10.6 |

== Personal life ==
Shuler is the son of Donald and Linda Shuler, and his father works in the state government. Shuler was diagnosed with vitiligo, a skin condition causing a loss of pigment, in his early high school years. He has five brothers and two sisters, including Dontrell, who plays college basketball for Middle Tennessee State, and Dominic, who plays professional basketball. Another brother, Deandre, died in 2000 at the age of three.
