= Chapin High School =

High school in Chapin, South Carolina, US

Location
- 300 Columbia Ave; Chapin, Lexington County, South Carolina 29036; United States; 34°10′01″N 81°20′24″W

Information
- School type: Public high school
- Established: 1924 (102 years ago)
- School district: Lexington & Richland County School District Five
- Principal: Ed Davis
- Teaching staff: 108.00 (FTE)
- Grades: 9–12
- Enrollment: 1,630 (2023-2024)
- Student to teacher ratio: 15.09
- Colors: Columbia blue, navy and white
- Athletics conference: AAAAA – Region V
- Nickname: Eagles
- Rival: Mid-Carolina High School
- Website: www.lexrich5.org/chs

Chapin High School is a public high school in Chapin, South Carolina. Nearly 1,400 students attend Chapin High School, as of the 2017–2018 school year. Chapin High School is one of four high schools in Lexington & Richland County School District Five.

== Athletics ==
Chapin High School competes in the South Carolina High School League in Class AAAAA – Region V. Chapin has competitive teams for cheerleading, football, baseball, basketball, softball, tennis, soccer, volleyball, golf, wrestling, swimming, lacrosse, track, and cross country.

=== State championships ===
- Baseball: 1954, 1956, 1957, 1969, 1982, 1983, 1984, 1996, 2001, 2002, 2018, 2026
- Basketball - Boys: 1969, 1970
- Basketball - Girls: 1973
- Competitive Cheer: 1999, 2003, 2005, 2006, 2008, 2009, 2010, 2011, 2012, 2014, 2015, 2016, 2017, 2018, 2019, 2021, 2023, 2024, 2025
- Cross Country - Boys: 1994
- Cross Country - Girls: 1992, 1995, 2002, 2003
- Football: 1973, 1974
- Golf - Boys: 2004
- Lacrosse - Girls: 2019
- Soccer - Boys: 2002, 2003, 2017, 2018
- Soccer - Girls: 2016, 2026
- Tennis - Boys: 2010, 2011, 2012
- Tennis - Girls: 1995,
- Volleyball: 1976, 1999
- Wrestling: 1993, 1996, 1997, 1998

== Marching band ==
The Chapin High School “Pride of the Midlands” Marching Band has won state championships in 1975 (1A), 1985 (2A), 2012 (3A), 2014 (3A), 2015 (3A), and 2017 (3A).

== Chapin school board ==
In 2023, the school board of Chapin High School received complaints against a teacher who assigned Ta-Nehisi Coates's book Between the World and Me in an Advanced Placement English class. The book was assigned to help present the perspective of being "Black in America". The complaints were based on a 2021 law passed to prevent lessons from making students "feel discomfort" based on their race. Ta-Nehisi Coates himself attended the school board meeting in which the teacher was reprimanded.

== Feeder schools ==
The following schools feed into Chapin High School:

- Chapin Elementary School
- Lake Murray Elementary School
- Ballentine Elementary School
- Piney Woods Elementary School
- Chapin Intermediate School
- Chapin Middle School

== Notable alumni ==
- Cody Brundage – UFC fighter, Class of 2012
- Iron & Wine – singer who had a #2 album on the Billboard 200 in 2011, Class of 1992
- DeWayne Wise – former MLB outfielder for the Chicago White Sox, Class of 1997
