= White Rock, South Carolina =

Unincorporated community in South Carolina, US

Coordinates: 34°08′43″N 81°16′32″W

White Rock is an unincorporated community in northwestern Richland County, South Carolina, United States, a few miles north of Lake Murray. It has a post office with the ZIP Code of 29177.

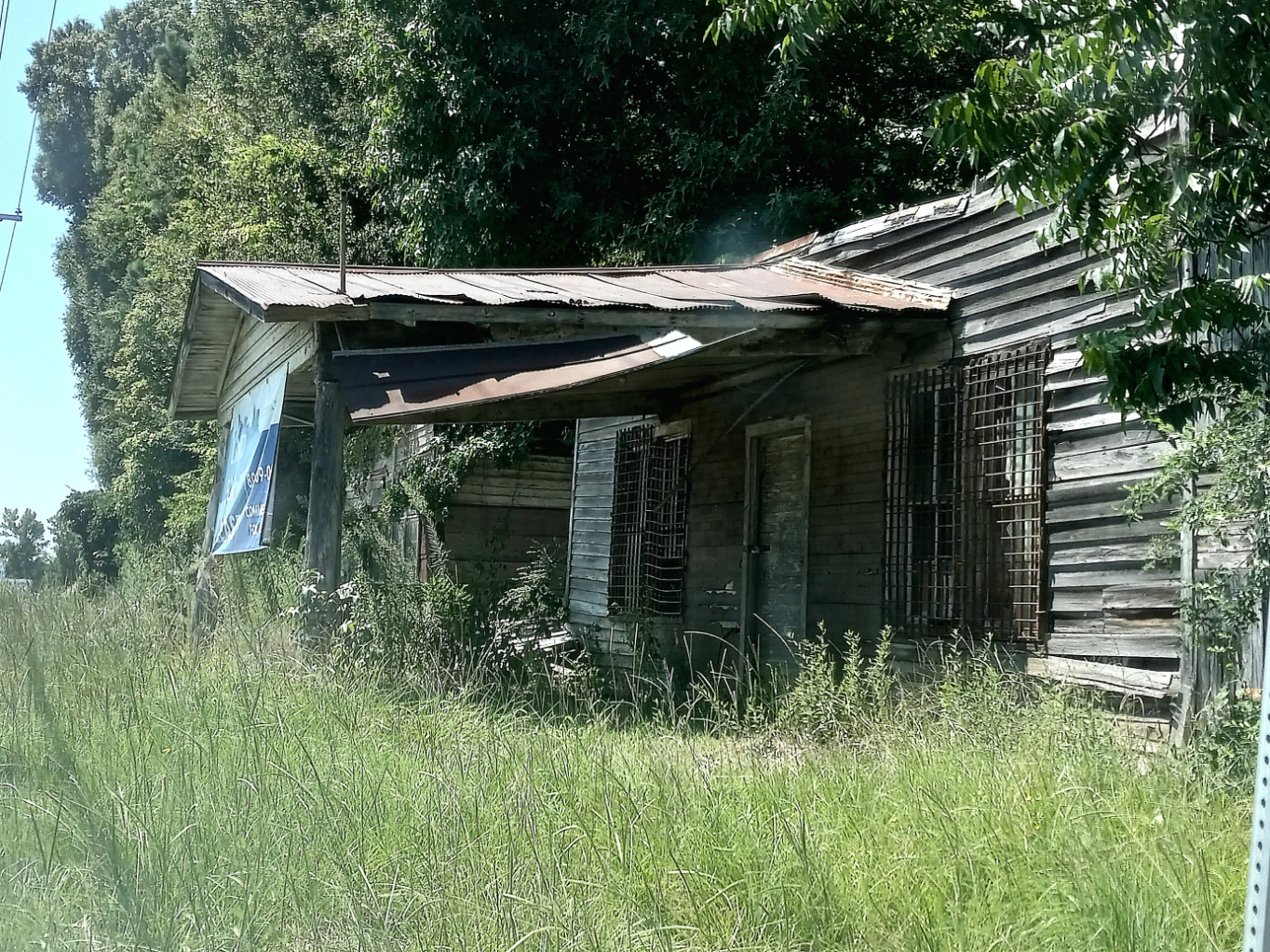
Abandoned General Store from the turn-of-the-century on Dutch Fork Road in White Rock, SC.

The population of the ZCTA for ZIP Code 29177 was 463 at the outdated 2000 census. The Lowman Home retirement home was established in 1911. In the 21st century, the White Rock area has been transformed by the addition and expansion of several subdivisions (Foxport, Lakeport, Osprey, Cedar Cove, Edenbrook, Eagle's Rest (est. 2007), Lakeside at Ballentine (est. 2002), Richard Franklin Estates, Westcott Ridge (across from I-26)), Waterfall, Portrait Hill, Lake Murray Elementary, Chapin Middle School, and Spring Hill High School (a magnet high school)-home to Lake Murray Docks and the Center for Advanced Technical Studies, all in Lexington & Richland County School District Five.
