= Jacob Wingard Dreher House =

Historic house in South Carolina, United States

- U.S. National Register of Historic Places
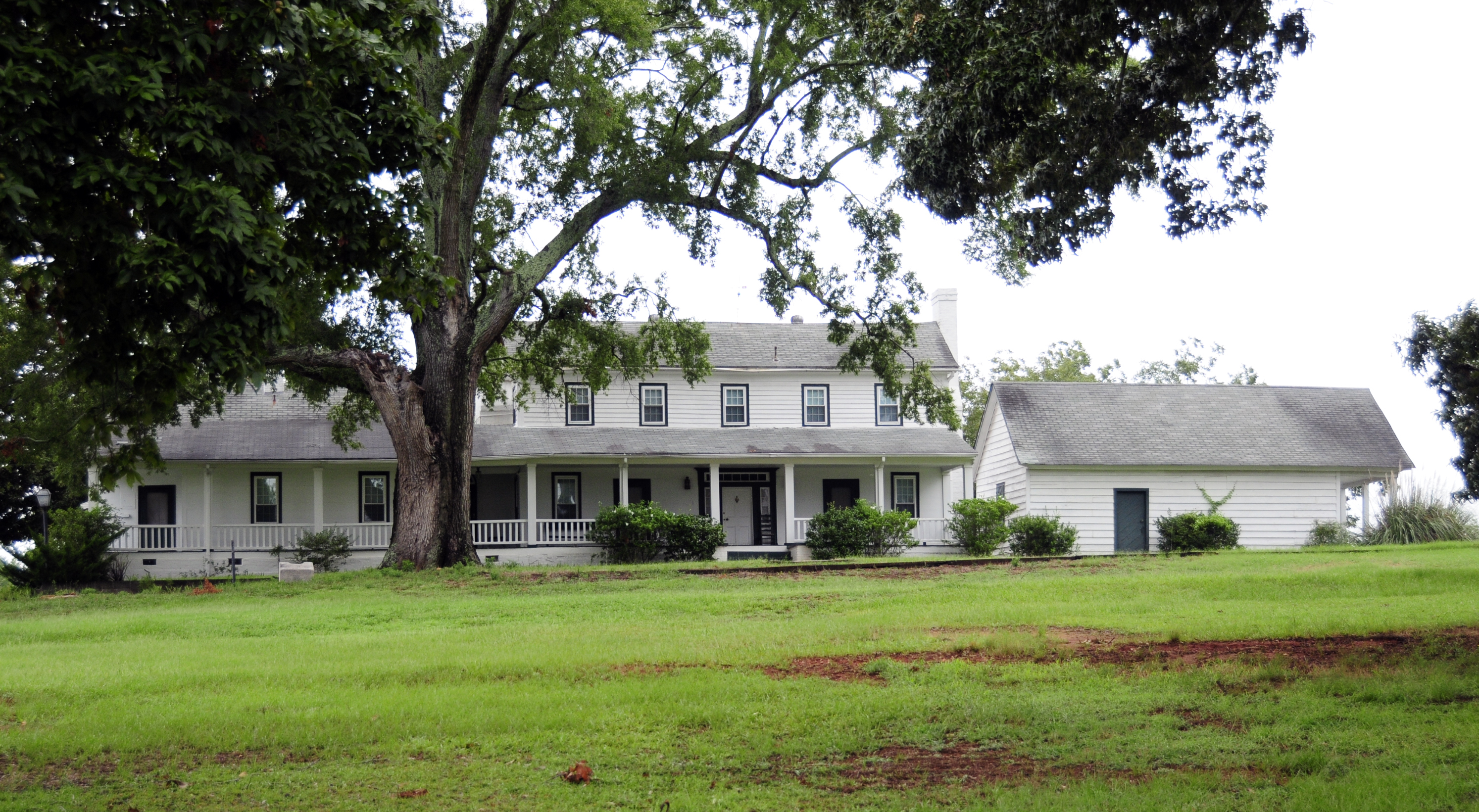
- Jacob Wingard Dreher House, August 2012

- Location within South Carolina Location within the United States
- Location: Off South Carolina Highway 6, near Irmo, South Carolina
- Coordinates: 34°4′13″N 81°14′27″W
- Area: 5 acres (2.0 ha)
- Built: c. 1850
- MPS: Lexington County MRA
- NRHP reference No.: 83003875
- Added to NRHP: November 22, 1983

The Jacob Wingard Dreher House, also known as Glencoe Farm, is an historic home located near Irmo, Lexington County, South Carolina. It was built about 1830–50, and is a two-story, rectangular weatherboarded frame farmhouse. It has a gable roof and features a one-story, shed-roofed porch across the front façade. A single story wing, added about 1910, is connected to the left elevation by a porch. Also on the property is a one-story, frame, weatherboarded store building, which was moved to its present location about 1945.

It was listed on the National Register of Historic Places in 1983.
