= Nick Emmanwori =

American football player (born 2004)

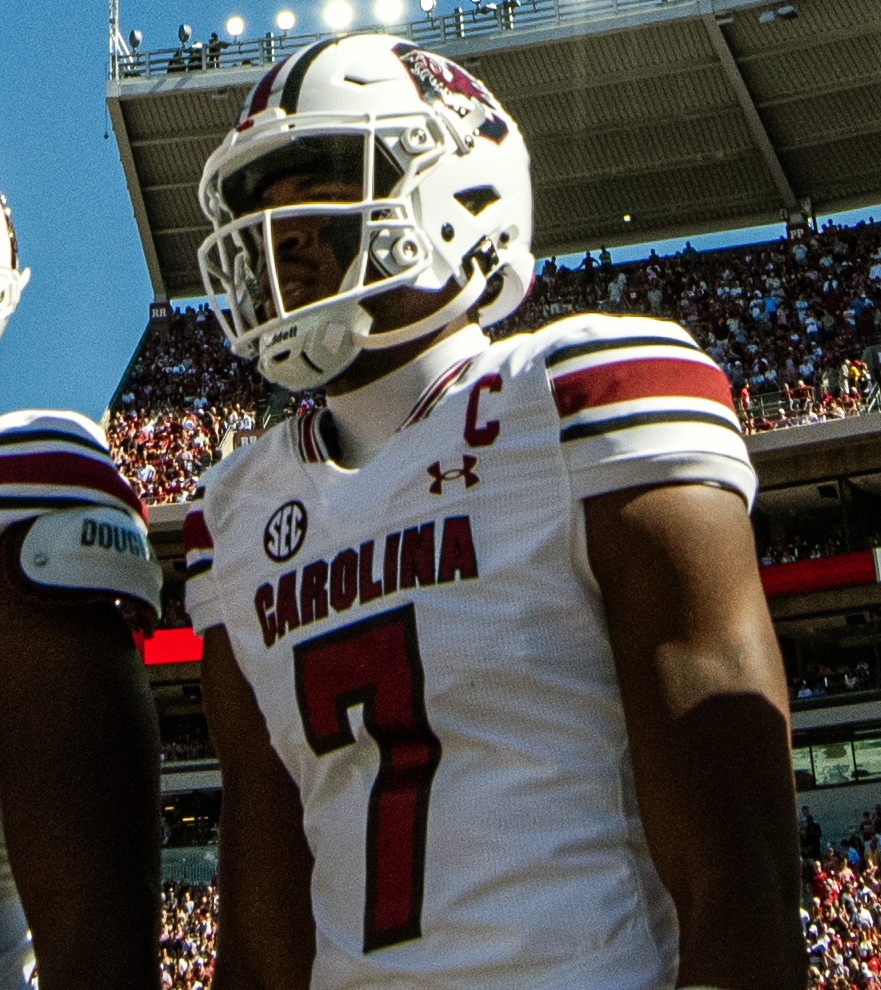
- Emmanwori with South Carolina in 2024

No. 3 – Seattle Seahawks
- Position: Safety
- Roster status: Active

Personal information
- Born: February 7, 2004 (age 22); Greensboro, North Carolina, U.S.
- Listed height: 6 ft 3 in (1.91 m)
- Listed weight: 220 lb (100 kg)

Career information
- High school: Irmo (Irmo, South Carolina)
- College: South Carolina (2022–2024)
- NFL draft: 2025: 2nd round, 35th overall pick

Career history
- Seattle Seahawks (2025–present)

Awards and highlights
- Super Bowl champion (LX); PFWA All-Rookie Team (2025); First-team All-American (2024); First-team All-SEC (2024); SEC All-Freshman Team (2022)

Career NFL statistics as of Week 10, 2026
- Tackles: 122
- Pass deflections: 14
- Interceptions: 1
- Sacks: 4.5
- Stats at Pro Football Reference

Nicholas Ovundah Eze Emmanwori (/ˌɛmənˈwɔːri/ Eh-man-WORE-ee; born February 7, 2004) is an American professional football safety for the Seattle Seahawks of the National Football League (NFL). He played college football for the South Carolina Gamecocks and was selected by the Seahawks in the second round of the 2025 NFL draft. He had a notably productive rookie season, where he came in second place for Defensive Rookie of the Year, and won Super Bowl LX as a key member of Seattle's "Dark Side" defense.

== Early life ==
Emmanwori was born on February 7, 2004, in Greensboro, North Carolina, the youngest of five brothers to Nigerian parents. He moved to Irmo, South Carolina, when he was seven, and later attended Irmo High School. As a senior, he was listed as a three-star recruit.

Emmanwori committed to play college football at the University of South Carolina over offers from Georgia Southern and UNC Charlotte.

== College career ==
When Emmanwori first started at South Carolina, his coaches debated on playing him either as a linebacker or safety, ultimately choosing the latter. In his first two collegiate starts, he recorded 11 and 14 tackles against Arkansas and Georgia, respectively. As a true freshman in 2022, he emerged as a key player for the Gamecocks, recording a team high 78 tackles and being named to the SEC All-Freshman Team. As a junior in 2024, he was named to the All-SEC first team and was named a first team All-American by the Associated Press.

== Professional career ==
Pre-draft measurables
Height	Weight	Arm length	Hand span	Wingspan	40-yard dash	10-yard split	20-yard split	Vertical jump	Broad jump	Bench press
6 ft 3 1/8 in (1.91 m)	220 lb (100 kg)	32 1/2 in (0.83 m)	9 in (0.23 m)	6 ft 6 1/4 in (1.99 m)	4.38 s	1.49 s	2.57 s	43.0 in (1.09 m)	11 ft 6 in (3.51 m)	20 reps
All values from NFL Combine

Emmanwori was selected by the Seattle Seahawks with the 35th pick in the second round of the 2025 NFL draft. In Week 14 against the Atlanta Falcons, he recorded two tackles for loss, a sack, a blocked field goal, and his first career interception. At the end of the regular season, he was named a finalist for Defensive Rookie of the Year, but lost to Carson Schwesinger of the Cleveland Browns, receiving seven first-place votes to Schwesinger's 40. Emmanwori had five total tackles in Super Bowl LX, a 29–13 win over the New England Patriots.

On July 22, 2026, it was announced that Emmanwori had undergone ankle surgery that would sideline him for a portion of training camp.

== Career statistics ==
Legend
	Won the Super Bowl
**Bold**	Career high

=== NFL ===
==== Regular season ====
Year	Team	Games		Tackles					Interceptions					Fumbles				
Year	Team	GP	GS	Cmb	Solo	Ast	Sck	TFL	Int	Yds	Lng	TD	PD	FF	Fmb	FR	Yds	TD
2025	SEA	14	11	81	56	25	2.5	9	1	0	0	0	11	0	0	0	0	0
2026	SEA	9	8	41	28	13	2.0	4	0	0	0	0	3	0	0	0	0	0
Career		23	19	122	84	38	4.5	13	1	0	0	0	14	0	0	0	0	0

==== Postseason ====
Year	Team	Games		Tackles					Interceptions					Fumbles				
Year	Team	GP	GS	Cmb	Solo	Ast	Sck	TFL	Int	Yds	Lng	TD	PD	FF	Fmb	FR	Yds	TD
2025	SEA	3	3	13	10	3	0.0	0	0	0	0	0	4	0	0	1	0	0
Career		3	3	13	10	3	0.0	0	0	0	0	0	4	0	0	1	0	0

=== College ===
Legend
Co-led NCAA Division I FBS

Year	Team	GP	Tackles					Interceptions					Fumbles			
Year	Team	GP	Cmb	Solo	Ast	Sck	TFL	Int	Yds	Avg	TD	PD	FF	FR	Yds	TD
2022	South Carolina	13	85	**62**	23	0.0	1.0	0	0	—	0	1	0	**1**	0	0
2023	South Carolina	11	71	47	24	0.0	0.0	2	0	0.0	0	**8**	0	0	0	0
2024	South Carolina	13	**88**	57	**31**	0.0	**3.0**	**4**	**107**	**26.8**	**2**	2	0	0	0	0
Career		37	244	166	78	0.0	4.0	6	107	17.8	2	11	0	1	0	0
