= BJ McKie =

American basketball player and coach (born 1977)

Wake Forest Demon Deacons
- Title: Assistant coach
- League: Atlantic Coast Conference

Personal information
- Born: April 7, 1977 (age 49) Norfolk, Virginia, U.S.
- Listed height: 6 ft 2 in (1.88 m)
- Listed weight: 190 lb (86 kg)

Career information
- High school: Irmo (Irmo, South Carolina)
- College: South Carolina (1995–1999)
- NBA draft: 1999: undrafted
- Playing career: 1999–2010
- Position: Point guard
- Coaching career: 2011–present

Career history

Playing
- 1999: BCM Gravelines
- 1999–2001: Connecticut Pride
- 2001–2002: North Charleston Lowgators
- 2002: Keravnos
- 2002–2003: Gießen 46ers
- 2003–2005: TBB Trier
- 2005–2006: Andrea Costa Imola
- 2006–2007: Juvecaserta Basket
- 2007–2008: Nuova Pallacanestro Pavia
- 2008–2009: Maccabi Haifa
- 2009–2010: Hapoel Afula
- 2010: Gimnasia La Plata

Coaching
- 2011–2017: Charleston Southern (assistant)
- 2017–2020: East Tennessee State (assistant)
- 2020–present: Wake Forest (assistant)

Career highlights
- 2× German League Top Scorer (2003, 2004); German League All-Star (2004); German League Best Offensive Player (2004); CBA All-Star (2001); 3× First-team All-SEC (1997, 1998, 1999); No. 3 retired by South Carolina Gamecocks; Second-team Parade All-American (1995); McDonald's All-American (1995); South Carolina Mr. Basketball (1995)

Bjorn "BJ" McKie (born April 7, 1977) is an American former professional basketball player and current assistant coach at Wake Forest. Born in Norfolk, Virginia, McKie went to high school at Irmo High School and played for the University of South Carolina men's basketball team. In January 1999, he became the Gamecocks' all-time leading scorer, surpassing Alex English. The college retired his number 3 jersey in 2005. His son, Justin McKie, also starred at Irmo, and followed in his father's footsteps, playing four years at South Carolina.

== American minor leagues ==
After his college career, McKie was drafted by the Connecticut Pride of the Continental Basketball Association. He played for them from 1999 to 2001, and appeared in the 2001 CBA All-Star Game. In 2001–02, McKie played for the North Charleston Lowgators (now the Florida Flame) of the NBA Development League.

== International career ==
Internationally, McKie has played for BCM Gravelines in France; Keravnos in Cyprus; Avitos Giessen and TBB Trier in Germany; Zarotti Imola, Pepsi Caserta and Nuova Pallacanestro Pavia in Italy; and Maccabi Haifa Heat and Hapoel Afula in Israel. He left Hapoel Afula in 2010.

While playing in Germany, McKie was a Basketball Bundesliga All-Star in 2004.
