= Robinson-Hiller House =

Historic house in South Carolina, United States

- U.S. National Register of Historic Places
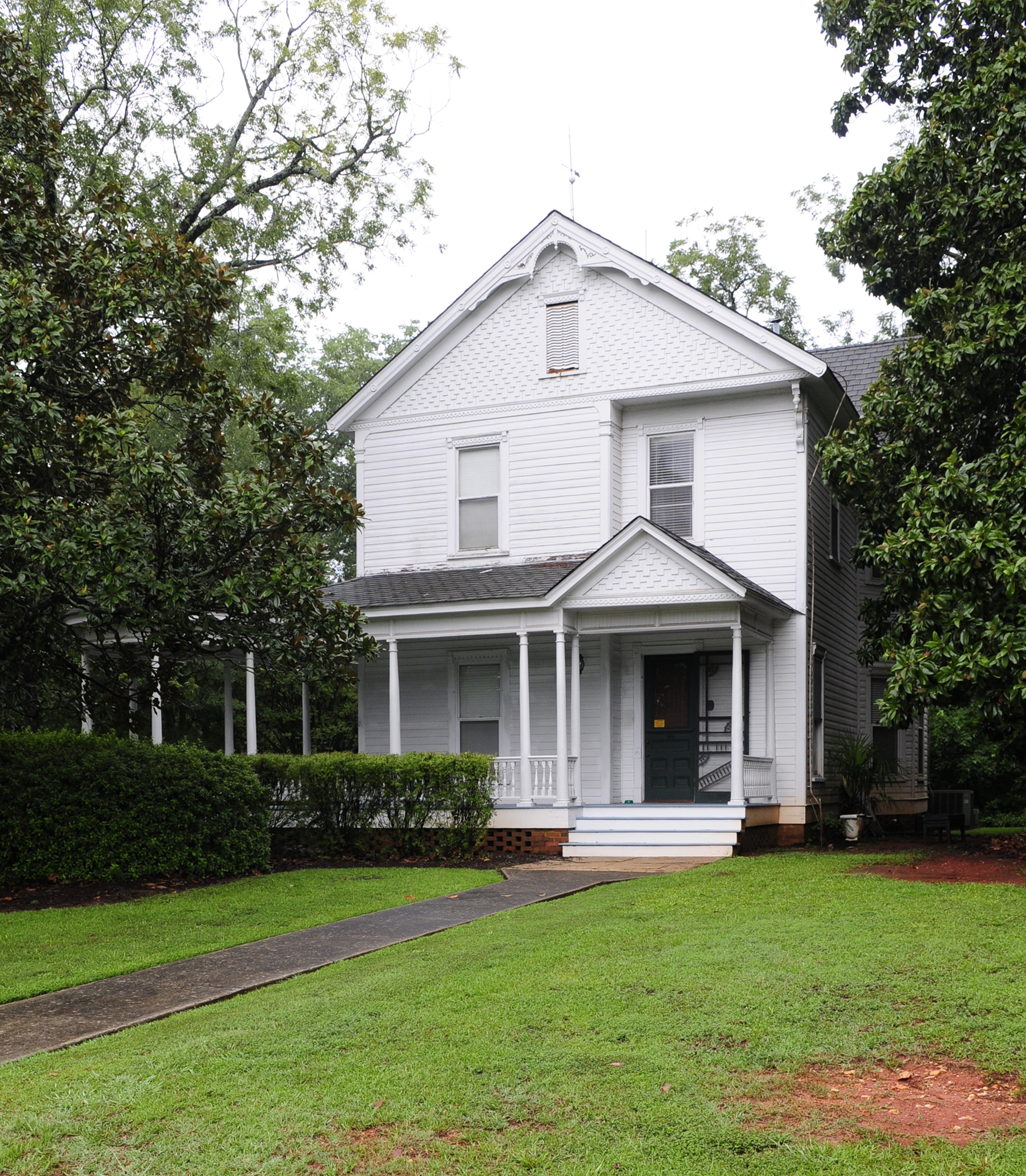

- Location within South Carolina Location within the United States
- Location: 113 Virginia St., Chapin, South Carolina
- Coordinates: 34°9′57″N 81°21′20″W
- Area: 2.4 acres (0.97 ha)
- Built: 1902
- Architectural style: Queen Anne
- NRHP reference No.: 98000420
- Added to NRHP: May 18, 1998

The Robinson-Hiller House in Chapin, Lexington County, South Carolina, was built in 1902. It is significant as a Queen Anne house and for being associated with Charles Plumber Robinson (1867–1944), a businessman who founded C.P. Robinson Lumber Company and other enterprises, and his wife Sarah "Eddie" Smithson Robinson, a "social activist and officer of the Woman’s Christian Temperance Union." In 1919, after the Robinsons left Chapin, the house was acquired by James Haltiwanger Hiller.

It was listed on the U.S. National Register of Historic Places in 1998. It is currently a commercial spa.
