= Spring Hill High School (South Carolina) =

High school in South Carolina, United States

Location
- 11629 Broad River Road; Chapin, South Carolina 29036; United States; 34°10′01″N 81°16′24″W

Information
- School type: Public high school
- School district: Lexington & Richland County School District Five
- Principal: Michael Lofton
- Teaching staff: 87.30 (FTE)
- Grades: 9–12
- Enrollment: 1,102 (2023-2024)
- Student to teacher ratio: 12.62
- Website: www.lexrich5.org/shhs

Spring Hill High School is an all-magnet high school in Chapin, South Carolina. As of 2016, the school had 1200 students and 81 certified staff members. Spring Hill is a part of Lexington-Richland School District 5. Its magnet program consists of 5 academies: Engineering, Entertainment, Entrepreneurial, Environmental Studies, and Exercise Science. As of 2020, they have a 98% graduation rate. Spring Hill currently has 35 clubs listed on its website, including GSA, FCA, and a Guitar Club that is led by the school's principal, Dr. Michael Lofton. Another notable club, unique to Spring Hill High School, is the Multimedia Gaming Club, MMGC, being the largest club in the school, provides an opportunity for students at Spring Hill to share their love of gaming with each other.

== Davis Cripe ==
=== Collapse and death ===
On April 26, 2017, 16-year-old Spring Hill High School student Davis Cripe collapsed in his classroom around 2:30 pm. He died later that day in the emergency room at Palmetto Health Parkridge Hospital from cardiac arrhythmia, a type of heart failure, caused by his extreme caffeine intake. Reportedly, Cripe had consumed a large diet Mountain Dew, a cafe latte from McDonalds, and an energy drink that morning. His coroner said that "based on his weight, the intake of caffeine that he had exceeded what is considered a safe level."

=== Aftermath ===
Cripe's hobbies as a drummer and guitarist inspired Spring Hill High School to dedicate a music room to Cripe and an annual, music-filled celebration of life called Live Life Loud.

Two years after Cripe's death, bill H.4352 was filed by Representative Leon Howard and Representative Chip Huggins. It proposed to "Provide a civil penalty for persons who furnish energy drinks to minors." Cripe's parents, Sean and Heidi Cripe, vocal supported and advocated for the passing of this bill, saying,"It'll be huge. Not only for our son Davis but knowing that here on out other kids will be protected." As of 2021, the bill has not been passed.
