= Lexington & Richland County School District Five =

School district in South Carolina, United States

District Five of Lexington and Richland Counties

Location
- South Carolina

District information
- Motto: Pursuing Excellence for Tomorrow's Challenges
- Grades: PK-12
- Established: 1951
- Superintendent: Dr. Akil Ross
- Schools: 12 elementary schools, 4 middle schools, 4 high schools, and 1 alternative school

Students and staff
- Students: 16,680
- Student–teacher ratio: 15:1

Other information
- Website: https://www.lexrich5.org/

School District Five of Lexington and Richland Counties (abbreviated as District Five or informally as Lex-Rich Five) is a South Carolina school district encompassing a land area of approximately 196 square miles, (508 km^{2}), roughly half of which is situated in each of Lexington and Richland counties.

It was formed in 1952 after a merger of several smaller districts. The school district consists of the northern portion of Lexington County lying north of Lake Murray and the Saluda River and the northwestern portion of Richland County lying south of the Broad River. The School District is primarily a residential suburban area located to the northwest of the city of Columbia, the capital city of South Carolina. Included in the District Five are the towns of Irmo and Chapin, as well as a sliver of Columbia (including the portion of the capital located in Lexington County). The school district has three attendance areas: Chapin, Dutch Fork, and Irmo. District Five operates a total of 12 elementary schools, four middle schools, five high schools, and one alternative school.

The interim Superintendent is Akil Ross, appointed in June 2021 following the sudden resignation of former superintendent Christina Melton at a board meeting on June 14 over conflicts with some school board members. The Chief of Academics and Administration is Tina McCaskill. The Current Board Chair is Dr. Scott Herring.

== History ==
In February 2023, an AP English teacher in Chapin was forced to halt a lesson on Ta-Nehisi Coates' book Between the World and Me by school administrators, who claimed that the lesson violated state budget provisions. South Carolina law prohibits the use of state funds for lessons that teach that "an individual should feel discomfort, guilt, anguish or any other form of psychological distress on account of his race or sex" or "an individual, by virtue of his race or sex, is inherently racist, sexist, or oppressive, whether consciously or unconsciously."

== Schools ==
=== High schools ===
- Irmo High School
- Dutch Fork High School
- Chapin High School
- Spring Hill High School
- Academy for Success - alternative school

=== Elementary and middle schools ===
- Ballentine Elementary School
- Chapin Elementary School
- Dutch Fork Elementary School
- H. E. Corley Elementary School
- Harbison West Elementary School
- Irmo Elementary School
- Lake Murray Elementary School
- Leaphart Elementary School
- Nursery Road Elementary School
- Oak Pointe Elementary School
- Piney Woods Elementary School
- River Springs Elementary School
- Seven Oaks Elementary School
- Chapin Middle School
- Crossroads Middle School
- Spring Hill Middle School
- Dutch Fork Middle School
- Irmo Middle School
