= Irmo High School =

Location
- 6671 St. Andrews Road; Columbia, South Carolina 29212; United States; 34°4′2″N 81°10′22″W

Information
- Type: Public high school
- Motto: "In Ourselves, Our Future Lies"
- Established: 1928 (98 years ago)
- School district: Lexington & Richland County School District Five
- Principal: Kaaren W. Hampton
- Teaching staff: 106.67 (FTE)
- Grades: 9–12
- Enrollment: 1,272 (2024-2025)
- Student to teacher ratio: 11.92
- Colors: Black and yellow gold
- Athletics conference: AAAAA – Region 4
- Nickname: Yellow Jackets
- Newspaper: The Stinger
- Website: www.lexrich5.org/ihs

Irmo High School is a public high school in unincorporated Lexington County, South Carolina, United States, with a Columbia postal address, named for the nearby town of Irmo. Irmo High School falls under the administrative jurisdiction of District 5 of Lexington and Richland Counties. It is an International Baccalaureate school.

== Athletics ==
Irmo's sports teams compete as the Yellow Jackets and participate in Class 4A SCHSL. The school has won 66 team state championships.

Although Irmo had been the "Yellow Jackets" for many years, in 1978 a new logo was introduced. Prior to 1978, Irmo used a yellow jacket image for a logo similar to most schools that are known as yellow jackets.

Details by sport:

- Football: The Irmo Yellow Jacket football team won a state championship in 1980.
- Boys soccer: The Yellow Jackets have won 15 state championships and appeared in 25 state championship games since 1978.
  - State championships: 1978, 1979, 1982, 1987, 1988, 1989, 1990, 1993, 1995, 1996, 1997, 1998, 2000, 2003, 2004, 2013
- Boys basketball: The Irmo boys' basketball team won state championship in 1991, 1994, 1995, 2011, 2013, and most recently 2023.
- Boys tennis
  - Champions (10): 1983, 1987, 1988, 1989, 1991, 1993, 1994, 1995, 1997, 2001
- Girls tennis:
  - Champions (8): 1990, 1991, 1992, 1996, 1998, 2000, 2001, 2004
- Baseball:
  - Champions (3): 1985, 1987, 1998
- Girls basketball
- Boys cross country
  - Champions (5): 1977, 1978, 1979, 1992, 1998
- Girls cross country
  - Champions (6): 1977, 1978, 1979, 1980, 1981, 1982
- Boys golf
  - Champions (5): 1971, 1972, 1973, 1974, 1987
- Girls golf
  - Champions (1): 1999
- Girls soccer
- Girls swimming
  - Champions (3): 1998, 1999, 2000
- Boys track and field
- Girls track and field
  - Champions (2): 1997, 1999
- Volleyball
  - Champions (2): 1998, 1999
- Wrestling
  - Champions (1): 1980

== Marching band ==
The Irmo High School marching band won 5A SCBDA Marching Championships in 1991 and 1994–2003.

== Feeder patterns ==
The following middle schools feed into Irmo High School:

- Crossroads Intermediate School
- Irmo Middle School

== Notable alumni ==
- André Bauer, 87th Lieutenant Governor of South Carolina from 2003 to 2011
- Nick Emmanwori, college football safety for the South Carolina Gamecocks
- Richard Evonitz, American serial killer, known for murdering three teenage girls in Spotsylvania County, Virginia
- Lilian Garcia, ring announcer, singer and podcaster
- Leeza Gibbons, American talk show host
- Trajan Jeffcoat, NFL defensive end for the New Orleans Saints
- Savannah McCaskill, professional soccer player
- BJ McKie, professional basketball player
- Zach Prince, professional soccer player
- Elton Pollock, college baseball coach
- Donna Rice Hughes, activist, author, speaker and film producer
- Courtney Shealy, Olympic gold medalist in women's swimming at 2000 Summer Olympics
- Devontae Shuler, professional basketball player
- Catherine Templeton, attorney and South Carolina politician
- Bobby Weed, golf course designer
- Delbert Wilkes Jr., professional wrestler known as "The Patriot"
- David A. Wright, businessman, politician, and energy policy advisor
