= Chapin, South Carolina =

- Town
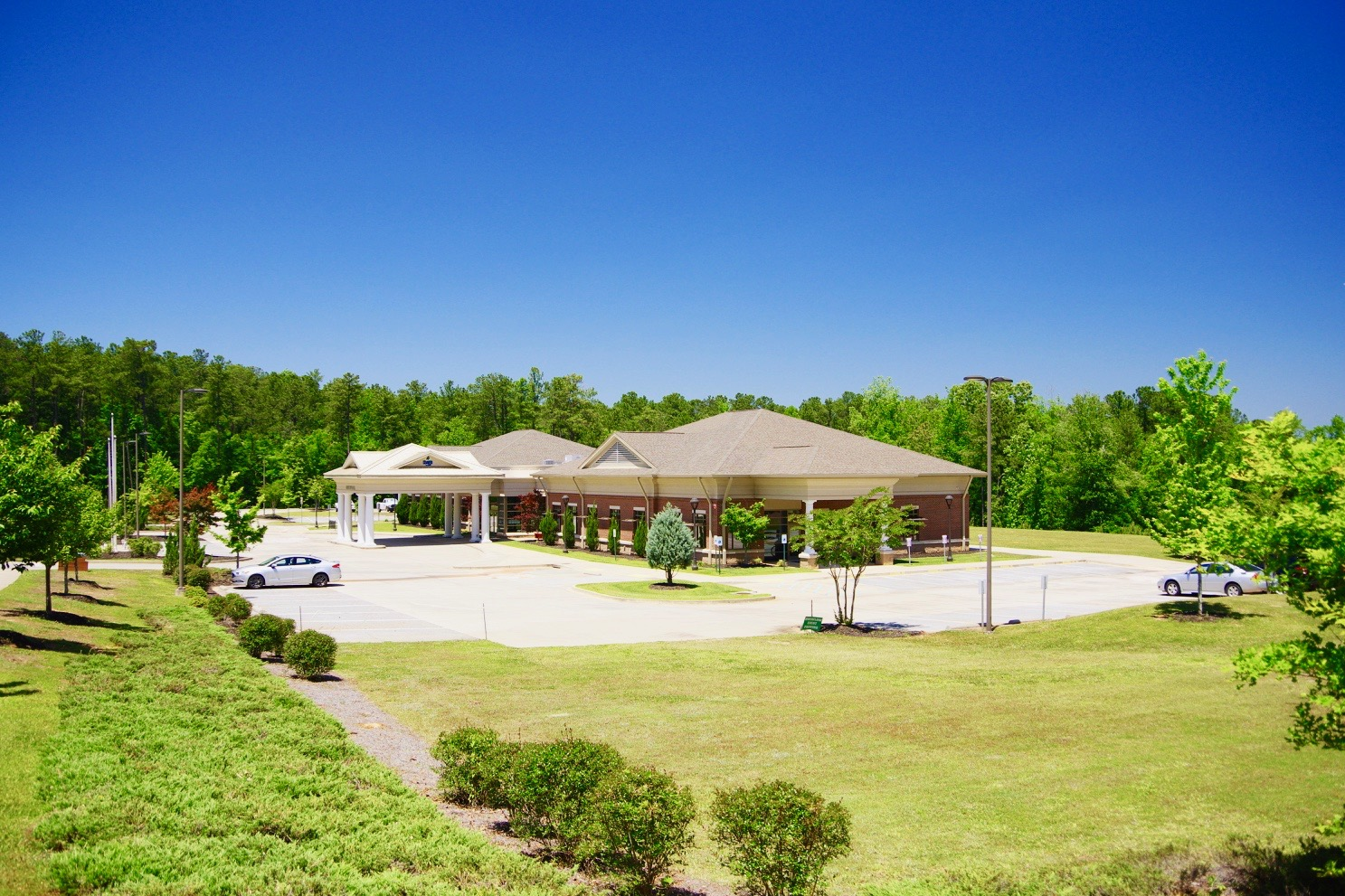
- Chapin Town Hall

- Flag Seal
- Nicknames: Capital of Lake Murray, Home of the Eagles
- Motto: "Fish Away"
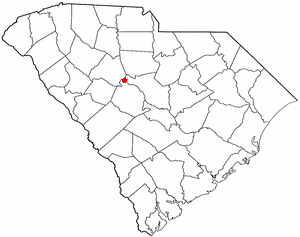
- Location of Chapin, South Carolina
- Coordinates: 34°09′54″N 81°20′41″W
- Country: United States
- State: South Carolina
- County: Lexington

Area
  - Total: 1.99 sq mi (5.16 km^{2})
  - Land: 1.98 sq mi (5.13 km^{2})
  - Water: 0.012 sq mi (0.03 km^{2})
- Elevation: 459 ft (140 m)

Population (2020)
  - Total: 1,809
  - Density: 913.8/sq mi (352.81/km^{2})
- Time zone: UTC-5 (Eastern (EST))
  - Summer (DST): UTC-4 (EDT)
- ZIP code: 29036
- Area codes: 803, 839
- FIPS code: 45-13150
- GNIS feature ID: 2406256
- Demonym: Chapinite
- Website: www.chapinsc.com

Chapin, South Carolina is a town located in Lexington County, South Carolina, United States. Chapin had a population of 1,809 at the 2020 census.

Chapin is located approximately 24 miles (39 km) northwest of Columbia, South Carolina.

== History ==
Chapin was named after Martin Chapin in 1889. After he and Laura Anne Benjamin were married on June 16, 1850, the couple moved down South because of Martin's health (a lung condition). The Chapins were living in Columbia when Martin's doctor suggested he to move to the Piney Woods area. Over the years, Chapin bought 4,218 acres (1,707 ha) of land in this area. He built a home in Piney Woods, and later a hotel in the 1880s along the new rail line that ran from Columbia to Laurens, the Columbia, Newberry and Laurens Railroad. The railroad provided a way to trade and transport goods to the capital city. Cotton and the lumber industry were flourishing with the railroad providing transportation. After Martin's death on August 31, 1894, Laura Chapin sold their home and moved into the Chapin hotel.

On March 28, 1907, Job S. Wessinger, P.M. Frick, and J. S. Honeycut founded the Bank of Chapin. One year later, the building for the bank was built. The bank prospered with help from the railroad.

During World War I, Chapin was doing well economically. The price of cotton had risen and the farmers were making plenty of money. As a result, the Bank of Chapin was also thriving during this time. The first high school was built in 1924.

Slowly the businesses in Chapin were starting to experience hard times nearing the 1930s. On Thursday, October 15, 1931, the Bank of Chapin did not open, and like other banks around the world, the bank would not allow customers to withdraw their money. Anybody who had money saved in the bank lost that money due to the crash of the stock market, later known as the start of the Great Depression. Another disaster to hit Chapin was the building of the dam on the Saluda River that would result in the building of a lake. This lake would take over most of the Chapin families’ farms and homesteads. The building of the dam was started in 1927.

In the midst of the Great Depression Chapin started a recreational team sport of baseball. In 1935, the Dutch Fork League was formed where Chapin had its own team. The team helped the unemployed men occupy their time during these difficult times. The games attracted thousands of people.

During the 1940s Chapin grew through improvements to the school and opening new businesses. One new business that came to Chapin were filling stations. The next business was a cabinet shop called E. A. Frick and Son. Chapin also built paved roads and a baseball field, and established the public library. In 1950, the first post office building was constructed, along with new telephone services.

The 1960s were about new and better services. Garbage collection was an issue in the '60s, so the town government bought land and built a landfill. Transportation was the next service provided by access to an interstate highway. On September 7, 1960, a section of Interstate 26 was opened between Columbia and Pomaria. The interstate made Chapin more accessible. Streets in town were also improved. Another improvement of the '60s was the new water system. In 1965, a volunteer fire department was organized, and in 1966 the town had its first ambulance. Chapin also started growing in population as more people moved to the town in the 1960s.

During the 1970s, new schools were built. Chapin football became a community event, and the school football team won state championships in 1973 and 1974. Also in the '70s, the number of churches in Chapin increased, with the establishment of Chapin Baptist Church, St. Francis of Assisi Episcopal Church, Our Lady of the Lake Catholic Church, and Lake Murray Presbyterian Church.

The Robinson-Hiller House was listed on the U.S. National Register of Historic Places in 1998, and the Chapin Commercial Historic District was added in 2019.

== Geography ==
Chapin is located in the northern corner of Lexington County.

According to the United States Census Bureau, the town has a total area of 2.0 square miles (5.2 km^{2}), of which 0.01 square miles (0.03 km^{2}), or 0.53%, are water.

While Chapin is a part of Lexington County, the creation of Lake Murray by the Dreher Shoals Dam cut Chapin off from the rest of the county by road, creating something of an exclave.

== Demographics ==
Historical population
Census	Pop.	Note	%±
1900	187		—
1910	345		84.5%
1920	264		−23.5%
1930	429		62.5%
1940	311		−27.5%
1950	327		5.1%
1960	358		9.5%
1970	342		−4.5%
1980	311		−9.1%
1990	282		−9.3%
2000	628		122.7%
2010	1,445		130.1%
2020	1,809		25.2%
U.S. Decennial Census

=== 2000 census ===
As of the census of 2000, there are 628 people, 249 households, and 192 families residing in the town. The population density is 134.7/km² (349.6/mi²). There are 261 housing units at an average density of 56.0 persons/km² (145.3 persons/mi²). The racial makeup of the town is 92.04% White, 6.37% African American, 0.16% Native American, 0.16% Asian, 0.00% Pacific Islander, 0.48% from other races, and 0.80% from two or more races. 0.64% of the population are Hispanic or Latino of any race. Per capita income was $24,124. Median household income within the town limits was $48,750.

=== 2010 census ===
The 2010 Census recorded that Chapin had a population of 1,445, with 658 total housing units within town limits.

=== 2020 census ===
Chapin racial composition
Race	Num.	Perc.
White (non-Hispanic)	1,399	77.34%
Black or African American (non-Hispanic)	148	8.18%
Native American	4	0.22%
Asian	49	2.71%
Other/mixed	75	4.15%
Hispanic or Latino	134	7.41%

As of the 2020 United States census, there were 1,809 people, 768 households, and 524 families residing in the town.

== Government ==
Chapin's mayor and the town council run for a four-year term. The council has chosen a mayor-council form of government. This means that the mayor has more majority status than council members. Chapin's town government is made up of three council members, a mayor pro tem, and a mayor.

=== History ===
In 1940, the mayor was S. J. Cannon. He served a one-year term along with officers W.W. Goza, H. E. Metts, Carl Shealy, and W. B. Fulmer. Other offices voted on during this election were town clerk and policeman. The next year, 1941, W. W. Goza was elected mayor and served until 1944. In 1944, J. L. Amick was elected mayor. Numerous others served as mayor between J. L. Amick and Albert Koon.

== Education ==
- Chapin High School
- Chapin Middle School
- Spring Hill Middle School
- Chapin Intermediate School
- Chapin Elementary School
- Lake Murray Elementary School
- Spring Hill High School
- Center for Advanced Technical Studies
- Piney Woods Elementary School

=== History of local schools ===
The first school in Chapin was located in the Chapin house. In 1924 a high school was built out of concrete blocks and brick. In 1927 the school alma mater "Chapin, Dear Chapin" was composed by Helen Miller. This alma mater is the same one used at Chapin High School today.

Chapin schools and churches were the center of life in town according to historian Addison Bostain. Chapin High School had 150 students enrolled in 1929 and the elementary school had 150 students. The school only housed 11 grades.

Chapin High School had been built in separate parts since 1924 and by 1940 the high school still did not have a gym. The school auditorium was home to both the theater and a basketball court. The gymnasium was not built until 1952. The Chapin community built the gym for less than $30,000.

The 12th grade was added to Chapin High School in 1948, as well as the first football team. The football team was a very expensive investment, so in 1952 the Irmo and Chapin High School football teams were combined. Together they were known as the Flying Dutchmen football team. The teams separated again, and Chapin has had its own team since 1959.

In 1970, a new high school was built with much better facilities. It had new labs, band, chorus, and physical educational areas. In addition to a new building, the Chapin football team became a powerhouse for football in state of South Carolina. Cecil Woolbright became Chapin High School's head football coach and athletic director in 1968. The Chapin High School Eagles won two state championships and three conference titles in three years. This happened in 1973, 1974 and 1975, along with a 30-game winning streak. The high school's mascot is named Cecil the Eagle.

A new elementary school opened in August 1977, which could house 840 children.

=== Library ===
Chapin has a public library, a branch of the Lexington County Public Library.

== Churches ==
The first church established in Chapin was Mt. Horeb Lutheran Church in 1891. The Chapin Methodist Church was established in 1889, but was not within town limits until 1892. Also in 1892, Mt. Zion Baptist Church was started with an African American congregation. Another church for African Americans was St. John's AME church, which is older than Mt. Zion, but the date is unknown. Much later in 1972 was the start of Chapin Baptist Church. Lake Murray Presbyterian Church was organized in 1974. Next to arrive in Chapin was St. Francis of Assisi Episcopal Church in 1977. Chapin United Methodist Church exited the UMC and was renamed Chapin Christian Community Church, a non-denominational church. Our Lady of the Lake Catholic Church was established in 1978, and offers the Traditional Latin Mass.

- Chapin Baptist Church
- Chapin Community Church
- Chapin Fellowship Bible Church
- Chapin Presbyterian Church
- Chapin Christian Community Church
- Lake Murray Presbyterian Church
- Mt. Horeb Lutheran Church (ELCA)
- Mt. Zion Baptist Church
- Our Lady of the Lake Catholic Church
- St. Francis of Assisi Episcopal Church
- St. John AME Church
- St. Peter Lutheran Church (NALC)

== Attractions ==
=== Lake Murray ===
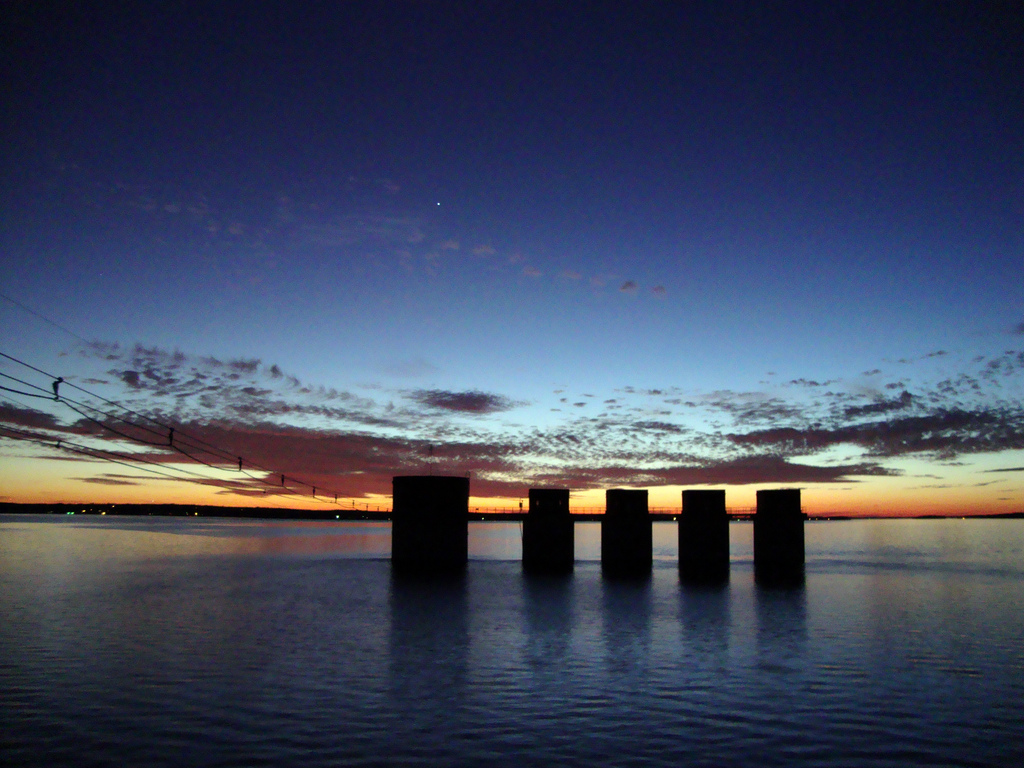
View of Lake Murray

Chapin is often referred to as the "capital of Lake Murray". On September 21, 1927, work on the dam for the Saluda River was started. The construction finished on June 30, 1930. Chapin families who had lived on Chapin land for over 200 years had to sell and move to make room for the lake that was a result of the dam. The lake was to spread between Dutch Fork and Chapin, becoming 14 miles (23 km) wide and 40 miles (64 km) long.

The earthen dam stands over 200 feet (61 m) tall and runs 1.5 miles (2.4 km) across. Lake Murray has over 500 miles (800 km) of shoreline and covers approximately 50,000 acres (200 km^{2}). The dam itself takes up 99 acres (40 ha). The nearest arm of the lake reaches within 0.5 miles (0.80 km) of the town limits.

The dam on Lake Murray has been through many changes since it was originally built in 1927. In 1943, 3 feet (0.91 m) were added to the dam's height to help flooding issues. Much later, in the 1980s, SCE&G added a sheet piling way on the lakeside of the highway, again to help with flooding. This raised the height of the dam again.

The latest changes to the dam occurred in 2002 when the backup dam was built. The backup dam was built for more protection to withstand earthquakes. The backup dam is made of rock and concrete to withstand the weight of the water behind the dam if any damage were to occur to the existing dam.

Lake Murray is not only used to provide electrical power for surrounding areas, it brings boating activities to the area. Lake Murray offers many different types of boating opportunities in addition to recreational areas. Today, the lake has recreational swimming, boating, skiing, fishing, and wake-boarding. The lake also holds fishing tournaments and is home to many kinds of wildlife. Lake Murray is known for its purple martins, striped bass, and great blue heron.

=== Labor Day Festival ===
Chapin is home to the Chapin Labor Day Festival. The Chapin Labor Day Festival is held every year on Labor Day. The festival lasts for three days starting on the Saturday before Labor Day, and ending on Labor Day. On Monday, the festival activities start with a parade through town and often features local, state and sometimes national political candidates. The Chapin High School NJROTC marches in the parade annually. After the parade there is a carnival, "Chapin Idol", vendors, food, concerts, and a car show along the historic streets of downtown Chapin.

== In popular culture ==
A chapter in author Ta-Nehisi Coates' book The Message details Coates' trip to Chapin to meet with a local teacher named Mary Wood who had been forced to drop Coates' book Between the World and Me from her lesson plan after local outcry against the book. Wood invited Coates to accompany her and supporters of hers to a local school board meeting where Wood fought to keep her job.

== Notable people ==
- Sam Beam (born in 1974), indie-folk singer-songwriter known by the stage name Iron & Wine
- John R. Carpenter (1938–2025), geochemist
- Richard M. Kenan (1940–2020), politician
- DeWayne Wise (born in 1978), former outfielder in the Chicago White Sox organization and Atlanta Braves
