= Irmo, South Carolina =

- Town
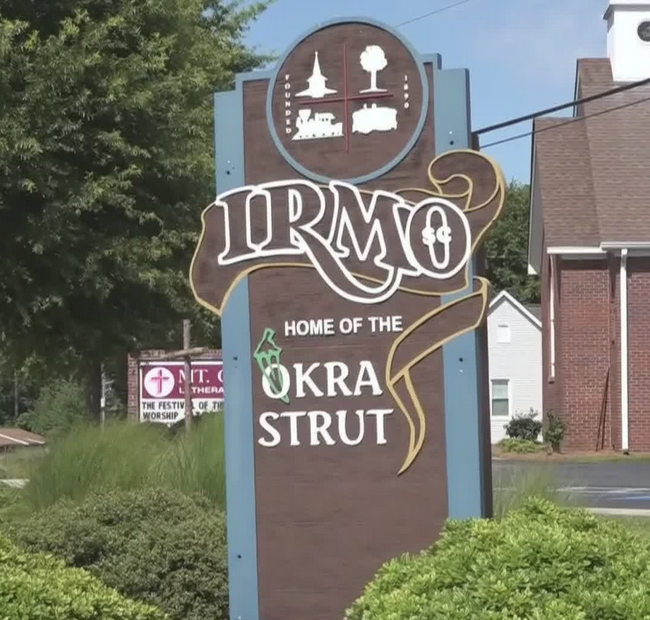

- Flag Seal
- Motto(s): "Gateway to Lake Murray and Home of the Okra Strut"
- Location in Richland County and the state of South Carolina.
- Coordinates: 34°07′10″N 81°12′30″W
- Country: United States
- State: South Carolina
- Counties: Lexington, Richland
- Incorporated: December 24, 1890
- Named after: C.J. Iredell and H.C. Mosely

Area
  - Total: 6.86 sq mi (17.77 km^{2})
  - Land: 6.86 sq mi (17.77 km^{2})
  - Water: 0 sq mi (0.00 km^{2})
- Elevation: 358 ft (109 m)

Population (2020)
  - Total: 11,569
  - Density: 1,660/sq mi (641.1/km^{2})
- Time zone: UTC-5 (EST)
  - Summer (DST): UTC-4 (EDT)
- ZIP code: 29063
- Area codes: 803, 839
- FIPS code: 45-35890
- GNIS feature ID: 2405893
- Demonym: Irmite

Irmo (/ˈərmoʊ/) is a town in Lexington and Richland counties, South Carolina, United States, and a suburb of Columbia. It is part of the Columbia Metropolitan Statistical Area and is located 12 miles (19 km) northwest of the city center. The population of Irmo was 11,569 at the 2020 census.

== History ==
Irmo was chartered on Christmas Eve in 1890 in response to the opening of the Columbia, Newberry and Laurens Railroad. The name of Irmo was the result of combining the names of Captain C.J. Iredell and Henry Moseley, two important figures in the founding of the town.

== Little League World Series ==
A baseball team from Irmo qualified for the 2025 Little League World Series, representing the Southeast Region.

== Geography ==
According to the United States Census Bureau, the town has a total area of 6.86 square miles (17.8 km^{2}), all land.

== Demographics ==
Historical population
Census	Pop.	Note	%±
1900	193		—
1910	267		38.3%
1920	236		−11.6%
1930	365		54.7%
1940	230		−37.0%
1950	281		22.2%
1960	359		27.8%
1970	517		44.0%
1980	3,957		665.4%
1990	11,280		185.1%
2000	11,039		−2.1%
2010	11,097		0.5%
2020	11,569		4.3%
2025 (est.)	12,204	▲	5.5%
U.S. Decennial Census

=== Racial and ethnic composition ===
Irmo town, South Carolina – Racial and ethnic composition Note: the US Census treats Hispanic/Latino as an ethnic category. This table excludes Latinos from the racial categories and assigns them to a separate category. Hispanics/Latinos may be of any race.
Race / Ethnicity (NH = Non-Hispanic)	Pop 2000	Pop 2010	Pop 2020	% 2000	% 2010	% 2020
White alone (NH)	8,370	6,981	6,466	75.82%	62.91%	55.89%
Black or African American alone (NH)	2,220	3,277	3,518	20.11%	29.53%	30.41%
Native American or Alaska Native alone (NH)	25	41	42	0.23%	0.37%	0.36%
Asian alone (NH)	157	178	241	1.42%	1.60%	2.08%
Native Hawaiian or Pacific Islander alone (NH)	9	0	29	0.08%	0.00%	0.25%
Other race alone (NH)	12	26	74	0.11%	0.23%	0.64%
Mixed race or Multiracial (NH)	89	223	536	0.81%	2.01%	4.63%
Hispanic or Latino (any race)	157	371	663	1.42%	3.34%	5.73%
Total	11,039	11,097	11,569	100.00%	100.00%	100.00%

=== 2020 census ===
As of the 2020 census, Irmo had a population of 11,569. The median age was 39.3 years. 22.3% of residents were under the age of 18 and 17.5% of residents were 65 years of age or older. For every 100 females there were 87.6 males, and for every 100 females age 18 and over there were 83.1 males age 18 and over.

There were 4,564 households in Irmo, including 3,327 families. Of all households, 33.5% had children under the age of 18 living in them. Of all households, 46.2% were married-couple households, 14.8% were households with a male householder and no spouse or partner present, and 32.3% were households with a female householder and no spouse or partner present. About 24.5% of all households were made up of individuals and 10.9% had someone living alone who was 65 years of age or older.

There were 4,825 housing units, of which 5.4% were vacant. The homeowner vacancy rate was 1.6% and the rental vacancy rate was 8.4%.

100.0% of residents lived in urban areas, while 0.0% lived in rural areas.

=== Demographic estimates ===
As of 2023, of the 11,519 people, about 7,550 are in Richland County and about 4,019 are in Lexington County.

=== 2000 census ===
As of the census of 2000, there are 11,039 people, 3,911 households, and 3,163 families residing in the town. The population density is 1,032.0/km² (2,670.2/mi²). There are 4,066 housing units at an average density of 380.1/km² (983.5/mi²). The racial makeup of the town is 76.76% White, 20.16% African American, 0.25% Native American, 1.43% Asian, 0.08% Pacific Islander, 0.44% from other races, and 0.88% from two or more races. 1.42% of the population are Hispanic or Latino of any race.

There were 3,911 households, out of which 47.7% had children under the age of 18 living with them, 65.9% were married couples living together, 12.0% had a female householder with no husband present, and 19.1% were non-families. 15.4% of all households were made up of individuals, and 2.6% had someone living alone who was 65 years of age or older. The average household size was 2.81 and the average family size was 3.15.

In the town, the population was spread out, with 30.7% under the age of 18, 6.6% from 18 to 24, 34.6% from 25 to 44, 23.3% from 45 to 64, and 4.8% who were 65 years of age or older. The median age was 34 years. For every 100 females, there were 93.6 males. For every 100 females age 18 and over, there were 88.7 males.

The median income for a household in the town was $55,847, and the median income for a family was $62,005. Males had a median income of $41,054 versus $30,171 for females. The per capita income for the town was $22,312. About 3.3% of families and 4.3% of the population were below the poverty line, including 4.4% of those under age 18 and 11.6% of those age 65 or over.

== Arts and culture ==
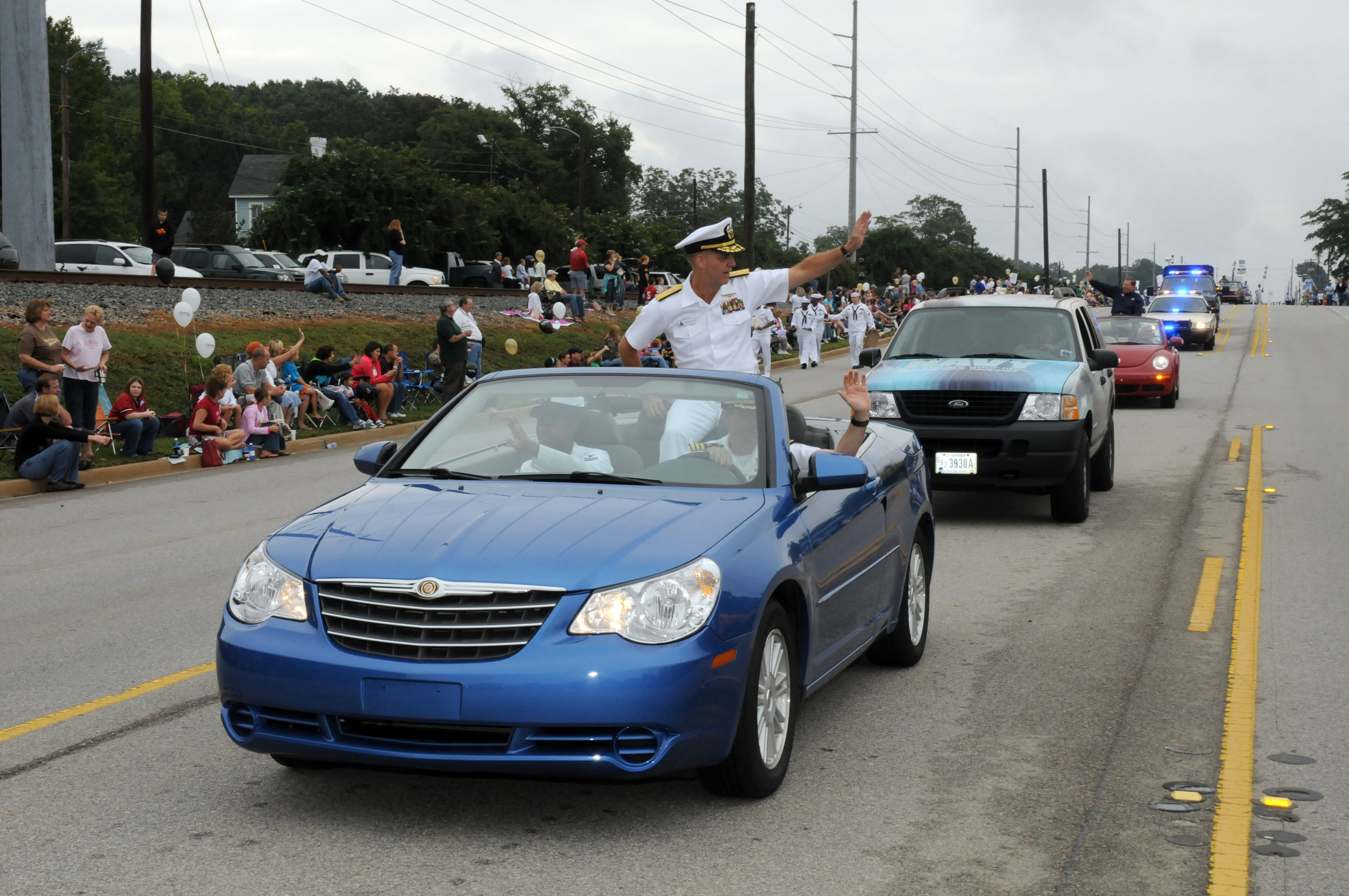
Okra Strut parade, 2008.

The Okra Strut is an annual festival started in 1973 as a fundraising effort for a new library. Named for the okra plant, events have included a charity golf tournament, street dance, live entertainment, a midway, cycling and running competitions, arts and crafts exhibits, and a parade.

The Jacob Wingard Dreher House is listed on the National Register of Historic Places. The Irmo area has two public libraries, one for each county the town is located in. The Irmo Branch of the Lexington County Public Library has a Columbia address while the Ballentine Branch of the Richland County Public Library has an Irmo address.

== Government ==
As of July 2025, the town council includes:

- Bill Danielson - Mayor
- Dr. Barb Waldman - Mayor Pro-Tem
- Phyllis Coleman - Council Member
- Gabriel Penfield - Council Member
- Mike Ward - Council Member

A town administrator, responsible primarily for the efficient operation of the town government, is appointed by the town council.

== Education ==
The school district is Lexington School District 5 for all parts of Irmo.

Schools in the city limits include:

- Irmo Elementary School serves grades K-5.
- H. E. Corley Elementary School
- Dutch Fork Elementary School

Schools in proximity to Irmo, with "Irmo" in their names, and/or with Irmo postal addresses, but not in the city limits:

- Crossroads Intermediate School serves grade 6.
- Irmo Middle School serves grades 6-8.
- Irmo High School serves grades 9-12.
- Dutch Fork Middle School serves grades 7-8
- Dutch Fork High School serves Grades 9-12.

== Notable people ==
- Tyler Bass (born 1997), NFL kicker for Buffalo Bills, attended Dutch Fork High School
- Harold Boulware (born 1913), chief counsel for the South Carolina NAACP, one of the prosecuting attorneys in Briggs v. Elliott (1952)
- Ben Bridwell (born 1978), singer for Band of Horses
- Alaina Coates (born 1995), professional basketball player for the Chicago Sky
- Danny Efland (born 1988), racing driver
- Nick Emmanwori (born 2004), NFL safety
- Leeza Gibbons (born 1957), talk show host
- Jalin Hyatt (born 2001), NFL wide receiver for the New York Giants
- Dustin Johnson (born 1984), professional golfer; attended Dutch Fork High School
- B.J. McKie (born 1977), minor league basketball player University of South Carolina
- Courtney Shealy (born 1977), swimmer, 2000 Olympic Gold Medalist
- E. Lee Spence (born 1947), pioneer underwater archaeologist and shipwreck historian
- Auden Tate (born 1997), NFL wide receiver for the Atlanta Falcons
