= Midlands of South Carolina =

Central region of South Carolina

Coordinates: 34.06°N 81.08°W

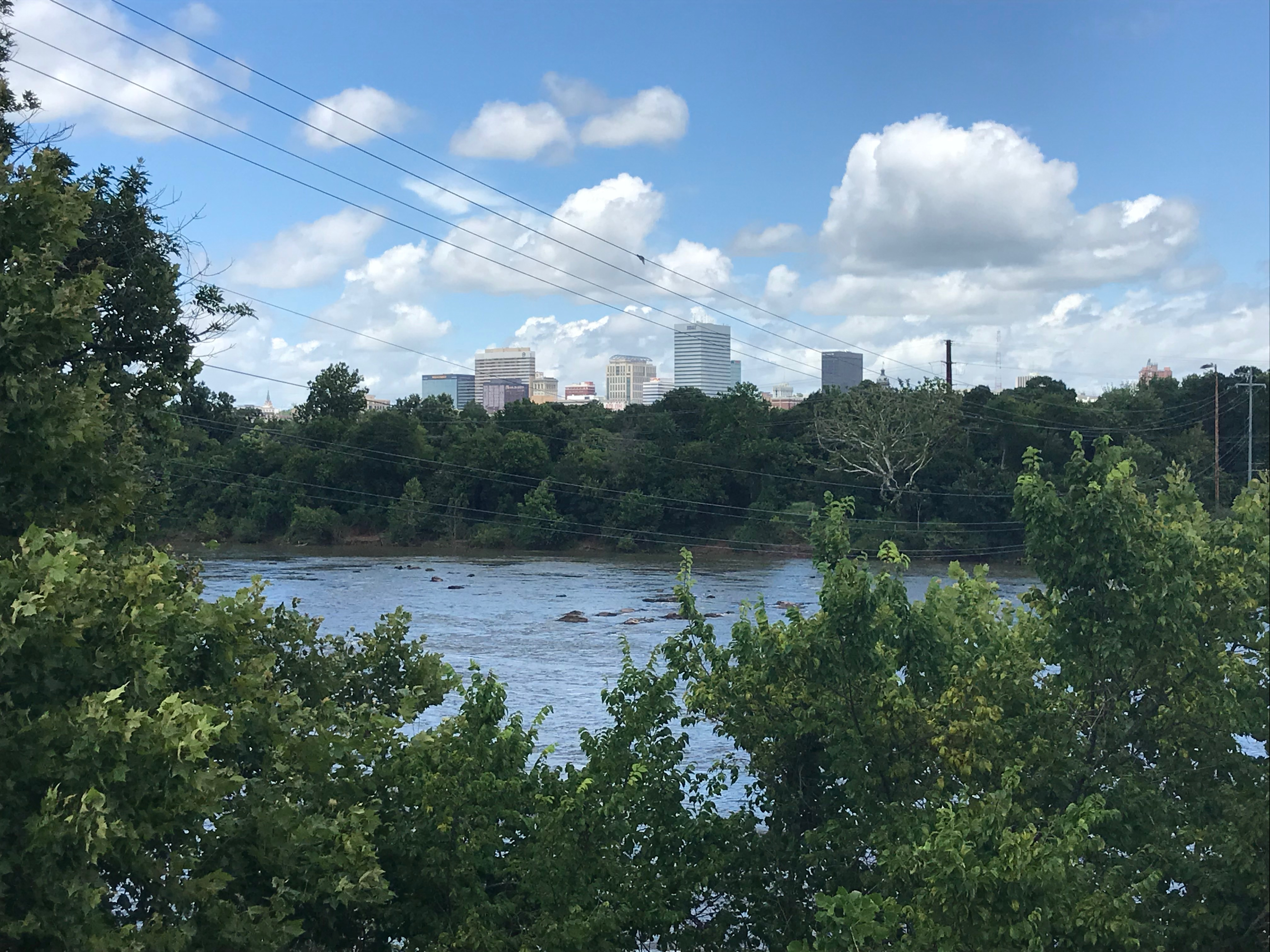
A view of the Columbia skyline across the Congaree River from Cayce

The Midlands is a region of South Carolina comprising the middle area of the state. The region's main center is Columbia, the state's capital. The Midlands is so named because it is the halfway point between the Upstate and the Lowcountry.

The area has become a major business center in the state, for its growing production of paper products, textile, medical supplies and steel. It is also a center for farming and medical care. The area is also involved in attractions and tourism, featuring shopping, fishing and amusement. The Midlands is home to Lake Murray, the state's third largest reservoir, as well as to Congaree National Park, the only national park in South Carolina.

As of the 2020 census the Midlands population was 1,019,439.

== Geography ==
Definitions of the "Midlands" area always include the counties in dark red, less often those in lighter shades.

The Midlands is largely coextensive with the Columbia metropolitan area, though the broadest definition also includes the South Carolina portions of the Charlotte and Augusta metropolitan areas. Much of the Midlands is also part of the Carolina Sandhills region.

The Midlands area of South Carolina always includes at least these nine counties:

Always included

- Calhoun
- Fairfield
- Kershaw
- Lexington
- Orangeburg
- Richland
- Saluda
- Sumter
- Chester

Usually included

- Lee
- Clarendon
- Newberry
- Aiken

Rarely included

- Barnwell
- Edgefield
- Lancaster
- York

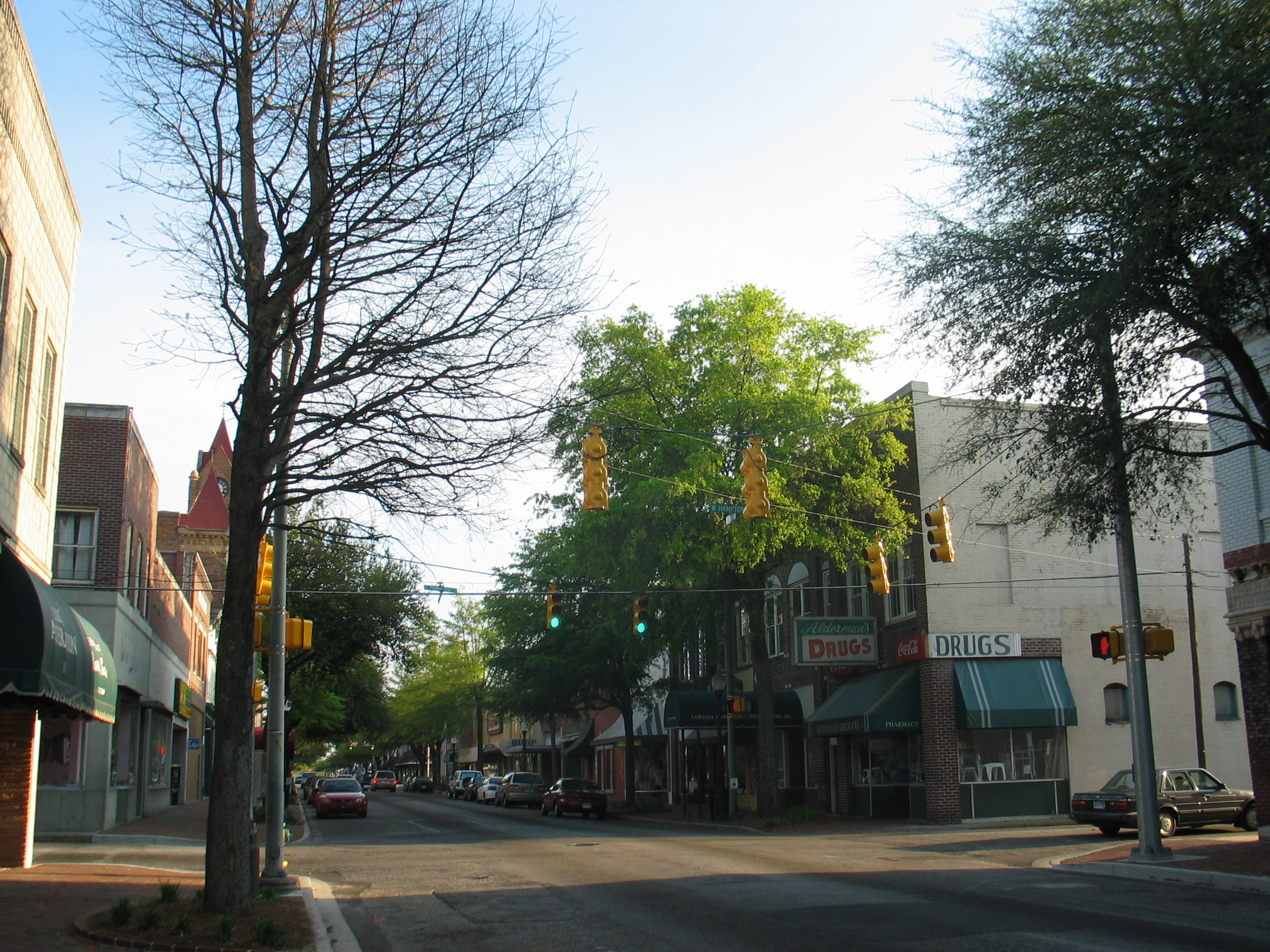
Downtown Sumter

== Cities ==
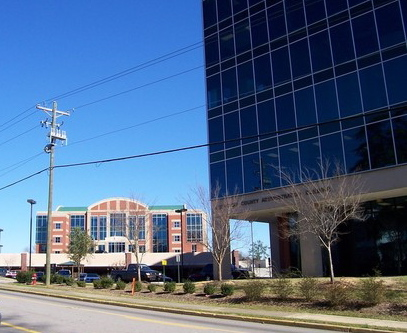
New Lexington Courthouse

=== Primary cities ===
(including county and 2020 census count)

- Columbia, Richland and Lexington 136,632
- Sumter, Sumter County 42,976
- Lexington, Lexington, 23,568
- Orangeburg, Orangeburg 12,704

=== Suburban towns and cities over 10,000 in population ===
(including county and 2020 census bureau population estimates)

- West Columbia Lexington, 17,416
- Cayce, Lexington, 13,789
- Irmo, Richland and Lexington, 11,569
- Newberry, Newberry, 10,691
- Forest Acres, Richland, 10,606

=== Suburbs with less than 10,000 inhabitants ===
(including county and 2020 census bureau population data)

- Arcadia Lakes, Richland, 865
- Batesburg-Leesville, Lexington, 5,270
- Blythewood, Richland, 4,772
- Camden, Kershaw, 7,788
- Chapin, Lexington, 1,809
- Eastover, Richland, 614
- Elgin, Kershaw, 1,634
- Gaston, Lexington, 1,608
- Gilbert, Lexington, 571
- Little Mountain, Newberry, 249
- North, Orangeburg, 696
- Pelion, Lexington, 631
- Pine Ridge, Lexington, 2,167
- Prosperity, Newberry, 1,178
- Ridgeway, Fairfield, 266
- Saluda, Saluda, 3,122
- Silverstreet, Newberry, 164
- St. Matthews, Calhoun, 1,841
- Springdale, Lexington, 2,744
- Swansea, Lexington, 722
- South Congaree, Lexington, 2,377
- Winnsboro, Fairfield, 3,215

=== Unincorporated communities ===
(2020 Census Figures)

- Dentsville, Richland, 14,431
- Hopkins, Richland, 13,025 (2010 data)
- Lugoff, Kershaw, 9,990
- Red Bank, Lexington, 10,924
- Seven Oaks, Lexington, 14,652
- St. Andrews, Richland, 20,675
- Woodfield, Richland, 9,199

== Higher education ==
- Allen University- Columbia
- Benedict College- Columbia
- Central Carolina Technical College- Sumter
- Claflin University- Orangeburg
- Columbia College- Columbia
- Columbia International University- Columbia
- Midlands Technical College- Columbia
- Newberry College- Newberry
- Morris College- Sumter
- Orangeburg-Calhoun Technical College- Orangeburg
- South Carolina State University- Orangeburg
- University of South Carolina- Columbia
- University of South Carolina Sumter- Sumter
- Webster University

== Media ==
The region is served by four commercial television stations, WLTX CBS 19, WOLO ABC 25, WACH FOX 57, and WIS 10.

The state's second largest newspaper, The State, is published here.

== Major highways ==
- I-20
- I-77
- I-95
- I-26
- I-126
- US 321
- US 21
- US 1
- US 76
- US 176
- US 178
- US 378
- US 15
- US 301
- US 601
- US 521
- SC 277
- SC 12
- SC 34
- SC 261
- SC 6
- SC 602
- SC 302

== Telecommunication ==
The Midlands are served by area codes 803 and 839, which form an overlay complex for the numbering plan area, which comprises the entire middle section of the state.
