= Columbia metropolitan area, South Carolina =

Greater Columbia, South Carolina
- Combined Statistical Area
- Columbia–Sumter–Orangeburg, SC; Combined Statistical Area
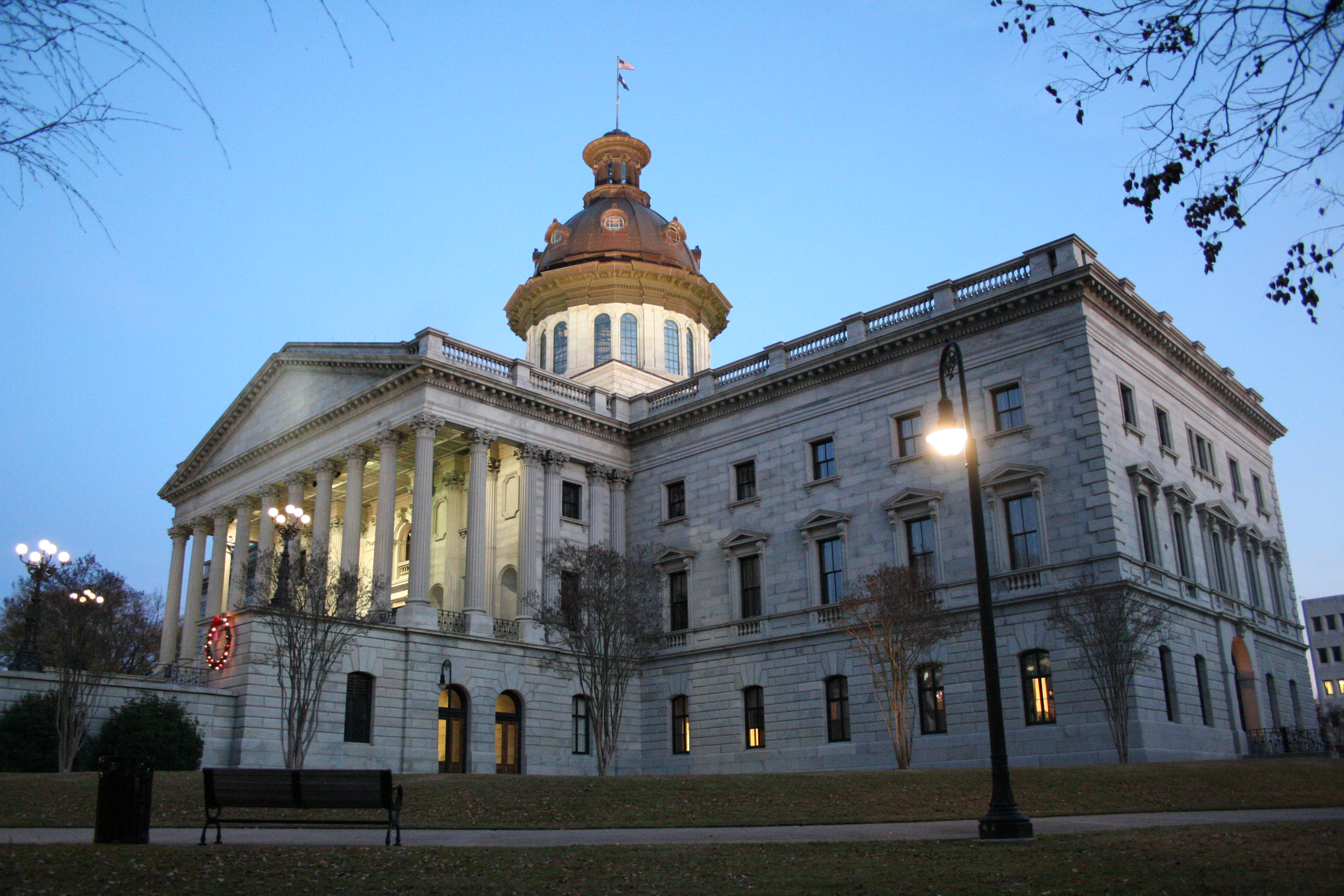
- The South Carolina State House
Map of Columbia–Sumter–Orangeburg, SC CSA
City of Columbia
Columbia, SC MSA
City of Sumter
Sumter, SC MSA
Orangeburg, SC μSA
Newberry, SC μSA
Other counties in the (East) Midlands
- Country: United States
- State: South Carolina
- Largest city: Columbia
- Other cities: Pontiac (unincorporated); Lexington; West Columbia; Sumter; Orangeburg; Newberry

Area
  - Land: 3,703 sq mi (9,590 km^{2})

Population (2025)
  - MSA: 879,918 (71st)
  - CSA: 1,107,723 (57th)

GDP
  - MSA: $54.072 billion (2022)
- Time zone: UTC−5 (EST)
  - Summer (DST): UTC−4 (EDT)

As defined by the U.S. Office of Management and Budget, and used by the U.S. Census Bureau for statistical purposes only, the Columbia, SC Metropolitan Statistical Area, is an area consisting of six counties in central South Carolina, anchored by the city of Columbia. The metropolitan area has an estimated population of 879,918 as of 2025. It is the third-largest metropolitan area in the state of South Carolina, behind the Greenville–Anderson–Greer and Charleston–North Charleston areas. The broader Columbia–Sumter–Orangeburg, SC Combined Statistical Area includes the Columbia and Sumter metropolitan areas, as well as the Newberry and Orangeburg micropolitan areas. The CSA has an estimated population of 1,107,723 as of 2025.

== Counties ==
County	Seat	2025 estimate	2020 Census	Change	Area	Density
Richland	Columbia	434,956	416,147	+4.52%	772 sq mi (2,000 km^{2})	563/sq mi (218/km^{2})
Lexington	Lexington	317,588	293,991	+8.03%	758 sq mi (1,960 km^{2})	419/sq mi (162/km^{2})
Kershaw	Camden	73,166	65,403	+11.87%	740 sq mi (1,900 km^{2})	99/sq mi (38/km^{2})
Fairfield	Winnsboro	20,340	20,948	−2.90%	710 sq mi (1,800 km^{2})	29/sq mi (11/km^{2})
Saluda	Saluda	19,680	18,862	+4.34%	462 sq mi (1,200 km^{2})	43/sq mi (16/km^{2})
Calhoun	St. Matthews	14,188	14,119	+0.49%	392 sq mi (1,020 km^{2})	36/sq mi (14/km^{2})
Total		879,918	829,470	+6.08%	3,834 sq mi (9,930 km^{2})	230/sq mi (89/km^{2})

== Communities ==
The following are cities and towns categorized based on the United States Census Bureau 2025 population estimates. No population estimates are released for census-designated places (CDPs), which are marked with an asterisk (*). These places are categorized based on their 2020 Census population.

=== Places with more than 100,000 inhabitants ===
- Columbia (147,035)

=== Places with 20,000 to 100,000 inhabitants ===
- Lexington (25,729)
- St. Andrews* (20,675)

=== Places with 10,000 to 20,000 inhabitants ===
- West Columbia (18,489)
- Seven Oaks* (14,652)
- Dentsville* (14,431)
- Cayce (13,680)
- Oak Grove* (12,899)
- Irmo (12,204)
- Red Bank* (10,924)
- Forest Acres (10,390)

=== Places with 5,000 to 10,000 inhabitants ===
- Lugoff* (9,900)
- Camden (9,201)
- Woodfield* (9,199)
- White Knoll* (7,858)
- Blythewood (7,233)
- Batesburg-Leesville (5,346)

=== Places with 1,000 to 5,000 inhabitants ===
- Capitol View* (4,653)
- Winnsboro (3,305)
- East Camden* (3,215)
- Saluda (3,086)
- Springdale (2,877)
- Hopkins* (2,514)
- South Congaree (2,424)
- Pine Ridge (2,346)
- Arthurtown* (2,294)
- Chapin (1,945)
- St. Matthews (1,827)
- Elgin (1,675)
- Gaston (1,651)
- Winnsboro Mills* (1,632)
- Gadsden* (1,301)
- Olympia* (1,087)

=== Places with fewer than 1,000 inhabitants ===
- Edmund* (969)
- Arcadia Lakes (852)
- Swansea (777)
- Eastover (704)
- Gilbert (638)
- Pelion (625)
- Ridge Spring (594)
- Fairview Crossroads* (540)
- Summit (464)
- Cameron (367)
- Bethune (339)
- Ridgeway (254)
- Monetta (partial) (212)
- Ward (124)
- Abney Crossroads* (101)
- Boykin* (88)
- Jenkinsville (40)

=== Unincorporated places ===
- Antioch
- Cassatt
- Fort Motte
- Horrell Hill
- Liberty Hill
- Lone Star
- Mitford
- Pontiac
- Sandy Run
- State Park
- Wateree
- Westville

== Demographics ==
As of the census of 2010, there were 767,598 people, 294,881 households, and 193,598 families residing within the MSA. The racial makeup of the MSA was 60.40% White, 33.20% African American, 0.40% Native American, 1.70% Asian, 0.10% Pacific Islander, 2.30% from other races, and 2.00% from two or more races. Hispanic or Latino of any race were 5.10% of the population.

The median income for a household in the MSA was $49,238, and the median income for a family was $61,972. Males had a median income of $43,658 versus $35,891 for females. The per capita income for the MSA was $25,615.

== Combined statistical area ==
The Columbia–Sumter–Orangeburg, SC Combined Statistical Area is made up of nine counties in central South Carolina. The statistical area includes two metropolitan areas and two micropolitan areas. As of the 2025 Census estimates, the CSA had a population of 1,107,723 and is the second-largest CSA in the state.

Statistical Area	2025 estimate	2020 Census	Change	Area	Density
Columbia, SC Metropolitan Statistical Area	879,918	829,470	+6.08%	3,834 sq mi (9,930 km^{2})	230/sq mi (89/km^{2})
Sumter, SC Metropolitan Statistical Area	105,067	105,556	−0.46%	682 sq mi (1,770 km^{2})	154/sq mi (59/km^{2})
Orangeburg, SC Micropolitan Statistical Area	83,177	84,223	−1.24%	1,128 sq mi (2,920 km^{2})	74/sq mi (28/km^{2})
Newberry, SC Micropolitan Statistical Area	39,561	37,719	+4.88%	647 sq mi (1,680 km^{2})	61/sq mi (24/km^{2})
Total	1,107,723	1,056,968	+4.80%	6,291 sq mi (16,290 km^{2})	176/sq mi (68/km^{2})

== See also ==
- South Carolina statistical areas
