= St. Andrews, South Carolina =

- Census-designated place
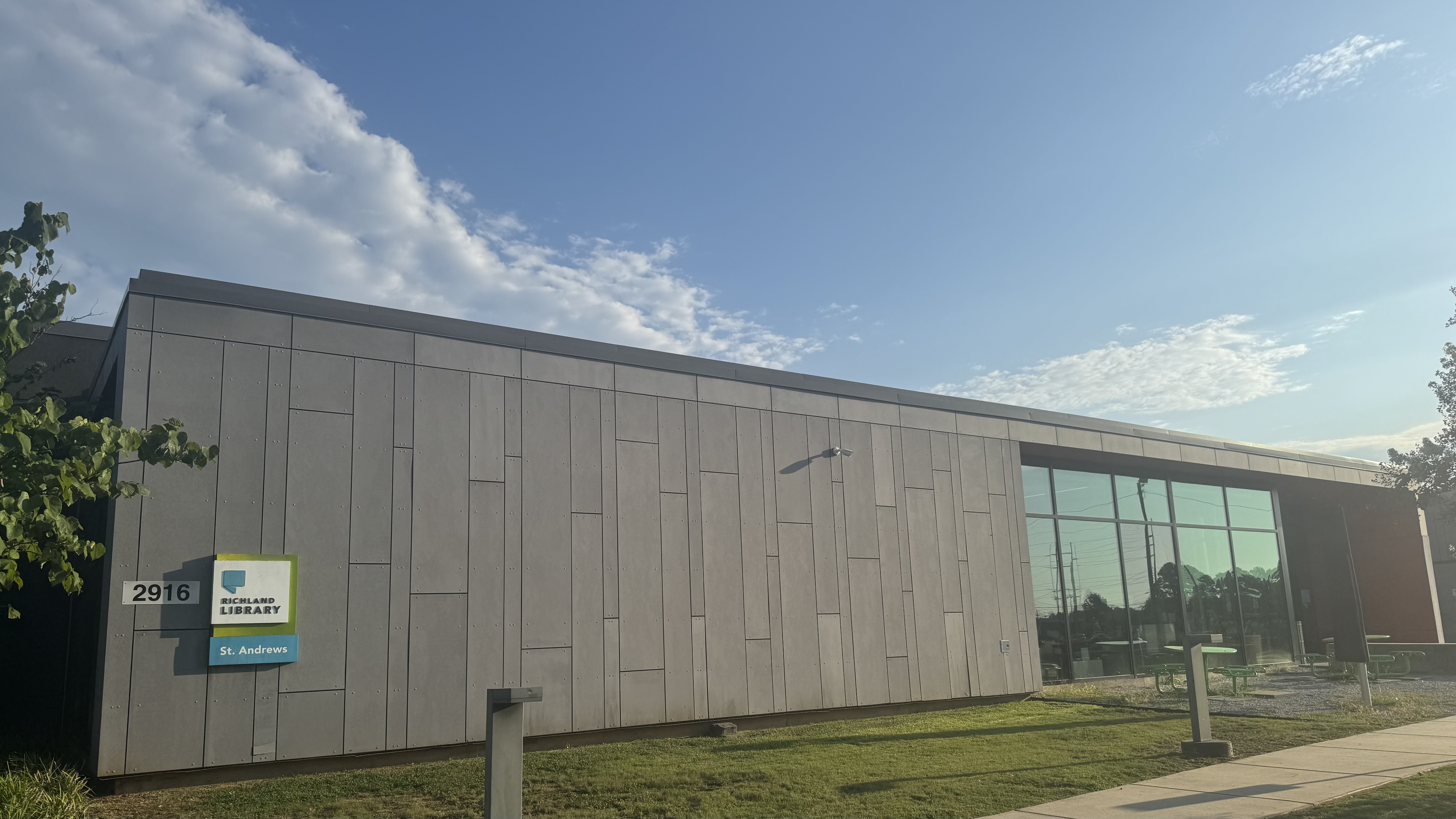
- Richland Library St. Andrews

- Location in Richland County and the state of South Carolina.
- Coordinates: 34°03′37″N 81°07′15″W
- Country: United States
- State: South Carolina
- County: Richland

Area
  - Total: 6.17 sq mi (15.99 km^{2})
  - Land: 6.15 sq mi (15.92 km^{2})
  - Water: 0.023 sq mi (0.06 km^{2})
- Elevation: 312 ft (95 m)

Population (2020)
  - Total: 20,675
  - Density: 3,362.8/sq mi (1,298.37/km^{2})
- Time zone: UTC−5 (Eastern (EST))
  - Summer (DST): UTC−4 (EDT)
- Postal codes: 29210 (Columbia)
- FIPS code: 45-62395
- GNIS feature ID: 2403501

St. Andrews or Saint Andrews is a census-designated place (CDP) in Richland County, South Carolina, United States. The population was 20,493 at the 2010 census. It is part of the Columbia, South Carolina metropolitan area.

== History ==
The Pine Grove Rosenwald School was listed on the National Register of Historic Places in 2009.

== Geography ==
According to the United States Census Bureau, the CDP has a total area of 6.4 square miles (16.5 km^{2}), of which 6.3 square miles (16.4 km^{2}) is land and 0.04 square miles (0.1 km^{2}), or 0.33%, is water.

St. Andrews is located northwest of Downtown Columbia, southeast of the town of Irmo. it is also east of the adjacent Seven Oaks CDP in Lexington County, where Interstate 26 forms a de facto border.

== Demographics ==
Historical population
Census	Pop.	Note	%±
2000	21,814		—
2010	20,493		−6.1%
2020	20,675		0.9%
U.S. Decennial Census

=== Racial and ethnic composition ===
St. Andrews CDP, South Carolina – Racial and ethnic composition Note: the US Census treats Hispanic/Latino as an ethnic category. This table excludes Latinos from the racial categories and assigns them to a separate category. Hispanics/Latinos may be of any race.
Race / Ethnicity (NH = Non-Hispanic)	Pop 2000	Pop 2010	Pop 2020	% 2000	% 2010	% 2020
White alone (NH)	9,213	5,516	4,798	42.23%	26.92%	23.21%
Black or African American alone (NH)	11,427	13,343	13,351	52.38%	65.11%	64.58%
Native American or Alaska Native alone (NH)	51	51	39	0.23%	0.25%	0.19%
Asian alone (NH)	399	395	588	1.83%	1.93%	2.84%
Native Hawaiian or Pacific Islander alone (NH)	14	15	16	0.06%	0.07%	0.08%
Other race alone (NH)	45	31	98	0.21%	0.15%	0.47%
Mixed race or Multiracial (NH)	234	388	807	1.07%	1.89%	3.90%
Hispanic or Latino (any race)	431	754	978	1.98%	3.68%	4.73%
Total	21,814	20,493	20,675	100.00%	100.00%	100.00%

=== 2020 census ===
As of the 2020 census, St. Andrews had a population of 20,675. The median age was 33.5 years. 21.6% of residents were under the age of 18 and 13.2% of residents were 65 years of age or older. For every 100 females there were 85.4 males, and for every 100 females age 18 and over there were 81.6 males age 18 and over.

99.8% of residents lived in urban areas, while 0.2% lived in rural areas.

There were 9,974 households in St. Andrews, of which 24.3% had children under the age of 18 living in them. Of all households, 20.9% were married-couple households, 26.1% were households with a male householder and no spouse or partner present, and 44.4% were households with a female householder and no spouse or partner present. About 43.4% of all households were made up of individuals and 10.8% had someone living alone who was 65 years of age or older. There were 4,364 families in the CDP.

There were 11,069 housing units, of which 9.9% were vacant. The homeowner vacancy rate was 1.9% and the rental vacancy rate was 9.0%.

Racial composition as of the 2020 census
Race	Num.	Perc.
White	4,969	24.0%
Black or African American	13,473	65.2%
American Indian and Alaska Native	60	0.3%
Asian	591	2.9%
Native Hawaiian or Pacific Islander	16	0.1%
Some other race	411	2.0%
Two or more races	1,155	5.6%
Hispanic or Latino (of any race)	978	4.7%

=== 2000 census ===
As of the census of 2000, there were 21,814 people, 10,497 households, and 5,091 families residing in the CDP. The population density was 3,167.8 inhabitants per square mile (1,223.1/km^{2}). There were 11,398 housing units at an average density of 1,655.2 per square mile (639.1/km^{2}). The racial makeup of the CDP was 43.05% White, 52.69% African American, 0.25% Native American, 1.83% Asian, 0.07% Pacific Islander, 0.83% from other races, and 1.27% from two or more races. Hispanic or Latino of any race were 1.98% of the population.

There were 10,497 households, out of which 24.1% had children under the age of 18 living with them, 28.8% were married couples living together, 16.1% had a female householder with no husband present, and 51.5% were non-families. 40.5% of all households were made up of individuals, and 5.6% had someone living alone who was 65 years of age or older. The average household size was 2.07 and the average family size was 2.83.

In the CDP, the population was spread out, with 21.2% under the age of 18, 15.8% from 18 to 24, 36.8% from 25 to 44, 17.6% from 45 to 64, and 8.6% who were 65 years of age or older. The median age was 30 years. For every 100 females, there were 86.3 males. For every 100 females age 18 and over, there were 82.8 males.

The median income for a household in the CDP was $34,551, and the median income for a family was $42,088. Males had a median income of $31,114 versus $25,329 for females. The per capita income for the CDP was $20,201. About 10.5% of families and 13.1% of the population were below the poverty line, including 20.5% of those under age 18 and 6.2% of those age 65 or over.

== Education ==
St. Andrews is zoned for Columbia High School of Richland County School District One and has its own public library, a branch of the Richland Library.
