= Jarvis Randolph Klapman =

American politician

Member of the South Carolina House of Representatives
- In office 1967–1968
- In office 1971–1992

Personal details
- Born: March 20, 1916 Columbia, South Carolina, U.S.
- Died: December 20, 2000 (aged 84)
- Spouse: Arlene E. McLellan
- Children: 3

Jarvis Randolph Klapman (March 20, 1916 – December 20, 2000) was an American politician. He served as a member of the South Carolina House of Representatives.

== Life and career ==
Klapman was born in Columbia, South Carolina. He attended Brookland-Cayce High School and Fort Benning Infantry School.

In 1967, Klapman was elected to the South Carolina House of Representatives, representing Lexington County, South Carolina, serving until 1968. In 1971, he was re-elected.

Klapman died in December 2000, at the age of 84.
