= 1956 United States presidential election in South Carolina =

- November 6, 1956

All 8 South Carolina votes to the Electoral College

Nominee	Adlai Stevenson	Unpledged electors	Dwight D. Eisenhower
Party	Democratic	“Nominated by Petition”	Republican
Home state	Illinois		Pennsylvania (Note: Although he was born in Texas and grew up in Kansas before his military career, at the time of the 1952 election Eisenhower was president of Columbia University and was, officially, a resident of New York. During his first term as president, he moved his private residence to Gettysburg, Pennsylvania, and officially changed his residency to Pennsylvania.)
Running mate	Estes Kefauver		Richard Nixon
Electoral vote	8	0	0
Popular vote	136,372	88,509	75,700
Percentage	45.37%	29.45%	25.18%
County results
Stevenson
40–50%
50–60%
60–70%
70–80%
80–90%
Unpledged
30–40%
40–50%
50–60%
60–70%
70–80%
Eisenhower
30–40%
50–60%
President before election
Dwight D. Eisenhower
Republican
Elected President
Dwight D. Eisenhower
Republican

The 1956 United States presidential election in South Carolina took place on November 6, 1956, as part of the 1956 United States presidential election. South Carolina voters chose eight representatives, or electors, to the Electoral College, who voted for president and vice president.

For six decades up to 1950 South Carolina had been a one-party state dominated by the Democratic Party. The Republican Party had been moribund due to the disfranchisement of blacks and the complete absence of other support bases as South Carolina completely lacked upland or German refugee whites opposed to secession. Between 1900 and 1948, no Republican presidential candidate ever obtained more than seven percent of the total presidential vote – a vote which in 1924 reached as low as 6.6 percent of the total voting-age population (or approximately 15 percent of the voting-age white population).

This absolute loyalty began to break down during World War II when Vice-presidents Henry A. Wallace and Harry Truman began to realize that a legacy of discrimination against blacks was a threat to the United States' image abroad and its ability to win the Cold War against the radically egalitarian rhetoric of Communism. In the 1948 presidential election, Truman was backed by only 24 percent of South Carolina's limited electorate – most of that from the relatively few upcountry poor whites able to meet rigorous voting requirements – and state Governor Strom Thurmond won 71 percent, carrying every county except Anderson and Spartanburg. Despite Truman announcing as early as May 1950 that he would not run again for president in 1952, it had already become clear that South Carolina's rulers remained severely disenchanted with the national Democratic Party. Both Thurmond and former Governor James F. Byrnes would endorse national Republican nominee Dwight D. Eisenhower – who ran under an independent label in South Carolina – and Democratic nominee Adlai Stevenson II only won narrowly due to two- and three-to-one majorities in the poor white counties that had given substantial opposition to Thurmond in 1948.

During the first Eisenhower term, South Carolina's whites who had supported him became extremely critical because Eisenhower was blamed for Brown v. Board of Education, whose requirement of desegregating the state's schools was intolerable. Consequently, state leaders like Thurmond argued that the GOP could not be a useful tool for opposing civil rights, and most of the state's Democrats endorsed Stevenson for his rematch with Eisenhower. Byrnes, however, obtained 35,000 petitions for an alternative slate of unpledged electors, whom he naturally endorsed when ballot access was obtained for that slate.

In mid-October, the consensus among pollsters was that the state's vote would be sharply split between the three slates, although polls just before election day suggested that Stevenson was likely to carry the state.

== Results ==
1956 United States presidential election in South Carolina
Party	Candidate	Votes	%
Democratic	Adlai Stevenson	136,372	45.37%
“Nominated by Petition”	Unpledged electors	88,509	29.45%
Republican	Dwight D. Eisenhower (inc.)	75,700	25.18%
Write-in		2	0.00%
Total votes		300,583	100%

=== Results by county ===
County	Adlai Stevenson Democratic		Unpledged Electors Nominated by Petition		Dwight D. Eisenhower Republican		Margin		Total votes cast
County	#	%	#	%	#	%	#	%	Total votes cast
Abbeville	2,985	83.36%	257	7.18%	339	9.47%	2,646 (Note: In this county where Eisenhower did run ahead of the unpledged slate, margin given is Stevenson vote minus Eisenhower vote and percentage margin Stevenson percentage minus Eisenhower percentage.)	73.89%	3,581
Aiken	4,280	34.81%	1,821	14.81%	6,195	50.38%	-1,915	-15.57%	12,296
Allendale	380	28.85%	675	51.25%	262	19.89%	-295	-22.40%	1,317
Anderson	11,344	76.80%	1,241	8.40%	2,186	14.80%	9,158	62.00%	14,771
Bamberg	430	22.95%	1,118	59.66%	326	17.40%	-688	-36.71%	1,874
Barnwell	1,914	63.61%	575	19.11%	520	17.28%	1,339	44.50%	3,009
Beaufort	710	25.57%	1,016	36.59%	1,051	37.85%	35 (Note: In this county where Stevenson ran third behind both Eisenhower and the unpledged slate, margin given is Eisenhower vote minus unpledged vote and percentage margin Eisenhower percentage minus unpledged slate percentage.)	1.26%	2,777
Berkeley	902	24.14%	1,779	47.62%	1,055	28.24%	-724	-19.38%	3,736
Calhoun	341	28.90%	693	58.73%	146	12.37%	-352	-29.83%	1,180
Charleston	4,028	16.07%	13,558	54.07%	7,487	29.86%	-6,071	-24.21%	25,073
Cherokee	3,687	75.21%	308	6.28%	907	18.50%	2,780	56.71%	4,902
Chester	2,951	62.80%	741	15.77%	1,007	21.43%	1,944	41.37%	4,699
Chesterfield	3,559	71.35%	634	12.71%	795	15.94%	2,764	55.41%	4,988
Clarendon	661	24.74%	1,787	66.88%	224	8.38%	-1,126	-42.14%	2,672
Colleton	1,463	36.14%	1,950	48.17%	635	15.69%	-487	-12.03%	4,048
Darlington	2,908	40.91%	2,603	36.62%	1,597	22.47%	305	4.29%	7,108
Dillon	1,879	62.97%	792	26.54%	313	10.49%	1,087	36.43%	2,984
Dorchester	862	26.80%	1,851	57.54%	504	15.67%	-989	-30.74%	3,217
Edgefield	525	25.71%	1,001	49.02%	516	25.27%	-476	-23.31%	2,042
Fairfield	961	36.29%	1,168	44.11%	519	19.60%	-207	-7.82%	2,648
Florence	3,463	35.46%	4,447	45.54%	1,855	19.00%	-984	-10.08%	9,765
Georgetown	1,020	23.39%	2,284	52.37%	1,057	24.24%	-1,227	-28.13%	4,361
Greenville	11,819	43.46%	4,622	17.00%	10,752	39.54%	1,067	3.92%	27,193
Greenwood	4,386	64.95%	1,247	18.47%	1,120	16.59%	3,139	46.48%	6,753
Hampton	564	27.43%	1,133	55.11%	359	17.46%	-569	-27.68%	2,056
Horry	4,835	59.17%	2,244	27.46%	1,092	13.36%	2,591	31.71%	8,171
Jasper	210	16.52%	658	51.77%	403	31.71%	-255	-20.06%	1,271
Kershaw	1,875	34.79%	1,996	37.04%	1,518	28.17%	-121	-2.25%	5,389
Lancaster	4,398	66.26%	629	9.48%	1,610	24.26%	2,788	42.00%	6,637
Laurens	3,726	56.05%	1,545	23.24%	1,377	20.71%	2,181	32.81%	6,648
Lee	943	38.26%	1,272	51.60%	250	10.14%	-329	-13.34%	2,465
Lexington	2,094	36.50%	2,455	42.79%	1,188	20.71%	-361	-6.29%	5,737
Marion	1,390	43.99%	1,353	42.82%	417	13.20%	37	1.17%	3,160
Marlboro	1,769	63.22%	522	18.66%	507	18.12%	1,247	44.56%	2,798
McCormick	485	55.81%	282	32.45%	102	11.74%	203	23.36%	869
Newberry	2,671	52.07%	1,398	27.25%	1,061	20.68%	1,273	24.82%	5,130
Oconee	3,510	73.17%	376	7.84%	911	18.99%	2,599	54.18%	4,797
Orangeburg	2,511	36.28%	2,943	42.52%	1,467	21.20%	-432	-6.24%	6,921
Pickens	1,847	43.17%	684	15.99%	1,747	40.84%	100	2.33%	4,278
Richland	6,154	27.49%	9,516	42.51%	6,714	29.99%	-2,802	-12.52%	22,384
Saluda	1,080	47.24%	865	37.84%	341	14.92%	215	9.40%	2,286
Spartanburg	16,637	65.03%	2,124	8.30%	6,822	26.67%	9,815	38.36%	25,583
Sumter	937	15.53%	3,741	62.00%	1,356	22.47%	-2,385	-39.53%	6,034
Union	3,760	66.10%	676	11.88%	1,252	22.01%	2,508	44.09%	5,688
Williamsburg	683	18.20%	2,739	73.00%	330	8.80%	-2,056	-54.80%	3,752
York	6,835	59.25%	1,192	10.33%	3,508	30.41%	3,327	28.84%	11,535
Totals	136,372	45.37%	88,509	29.45%	75,700	25.18%	47,863	15.92%	300,583

==== Counties that flipped from Democratic to Unpledged ====
- Florence

==== Counties that flipped from Republican to Democratic ====
- Greenville
- Marion
- Newberry
- Pickens

==== Counties that flipped from Democratic to Republican ====
- Aiken

==== Counties that flipped from Republican to Unpledged ====
- Berkeley
- Allendale
- Bamberg
- Calhoun
- Charleston
- Clarendon
- Colleton
- Dorchester
- Edgefield
- Hampton
- Jasper
- Kershaw
- Georgetown
- Lee
- Lexington
- Orangeburg
- Richland
- Sumter
- Williasburg

== Analysis ==
Ultimately South Carolina was won by Adlai Stevenson II (D–Illinois), running with Tennessee Senator Estes Kefauver by a more decisive margin than polls predicted. Stevenson gained 45.37 percent of the popular vote thanks to his continued dominance of the upcountry, whilst Eisenhower and the unpledged slate divided the lowcountry vote, with the unpledged slate finishing second with 29.45 percent and Eisenhower – this time running under the “Republican” banner – with 25.18 percent Wealthier whites left Eisenhower for the unpledged slate in large numbers, but unlike in 1952 when the small number of black voters strongly supported Stevenson, Eisenhower gained substantial, even majority, support from blacks able to vote in Charleston and Columbia.

The 1956 election in South Carolina marks the second of only three times in the 20th century that an incumbent president has finished third in any state. (Note: The other cases are William Howard Taft, who finished third overall in 1912, and George H. W. Bush, who finished third in Maine in 1992. Harry S. Truman in 1948 and Lyndon B. Johnson in 1964, however, were not even on the ballot in Alabama due to intractable opposition to those presidents’ civil rights policies by Alabama’s ruling politicians.) As of the 2020 presidential election, this is the last time that a Republican has been elected president without carrying South Carolina, and the last time that Greenville County voted for a Democratic presidential candidate. It is also the last time that Lexington County was not carried by the Republican candidate.
