= Oak Grove, South Carolina =

- Census-designated place
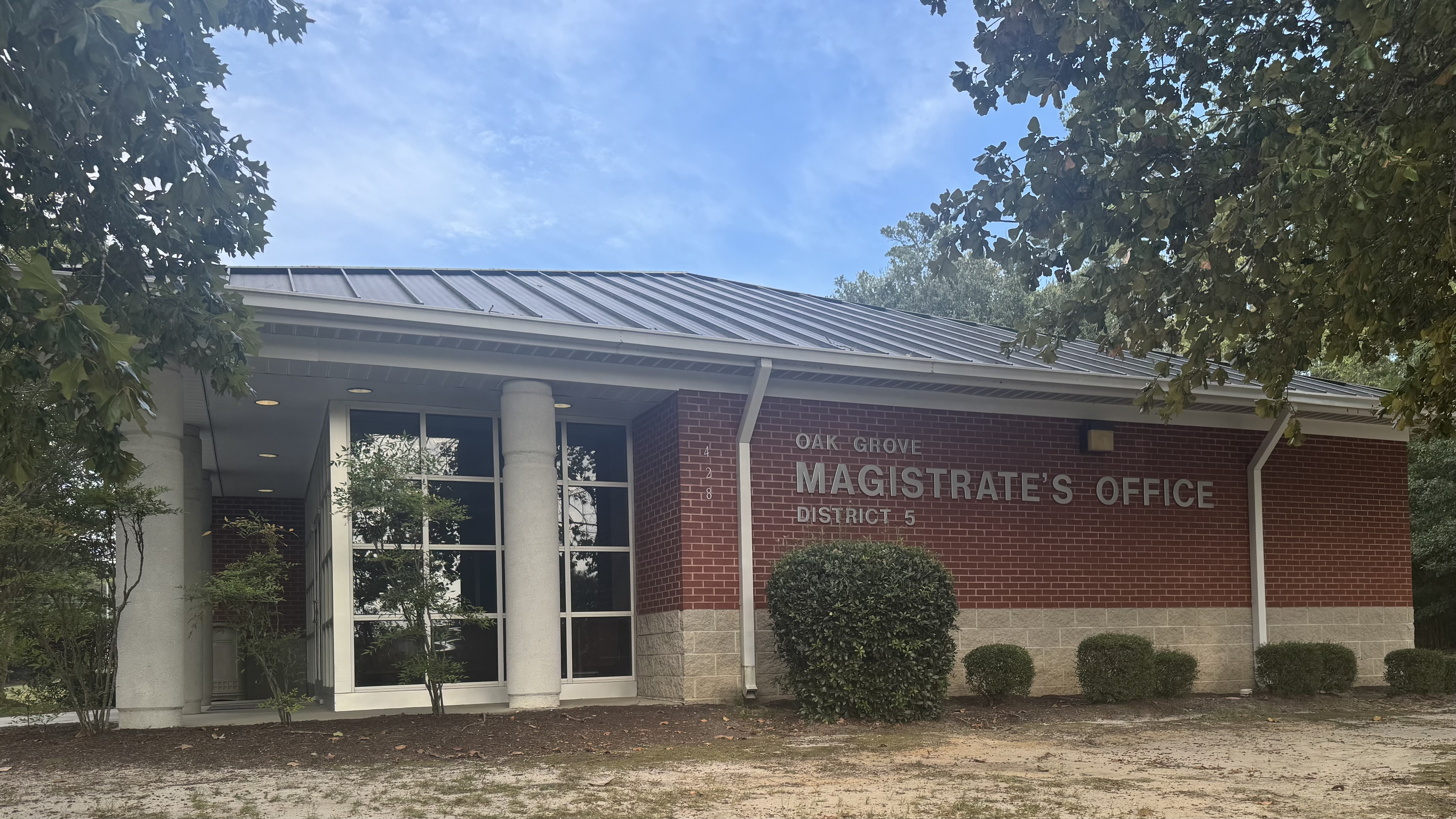
- Oak Grove Magistrate's Office

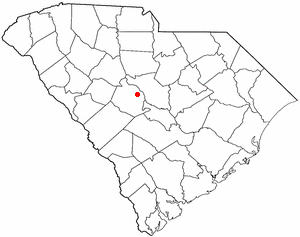
- Location of Oak Grove, South Carolina
- Coordinates: 33°58′26″N 81°9′23″W
- Country: United States
- State: South Carolina
- County: Lexington

Area
  - Total: 7.61 sq mi (19.71 km^{2})
  - Land: 7.58 sq mi (19.64 km^{2})
  - Water: 0.027 sq mi (0.07 km^{2})
- Elevation: 341 ft (104 m)

Population (2020)
  - Total: 12,899
  - Density: 1,700.7/sq mi (656.63/km^{2})
- Time zone: UTC-5 (Eastern (EST))
  - Summer (DST): UTC-4 (EDT)
- ZIP codes: 29073 (Lexington), 29170 (West Columbia)
- FIPS code: 45-51720
- GNIS feature ID: 2407593

Oak Grove is a census-designated place (CDP) in Lexington County, South Carolina, United States. The population was 10,291 at the 2010 census. It is part of the Columbia Metropolitan Statistical Area.

== Geography ==
Oak Grove is located in eastern Lexington County at 33°58′48″N 81°8′25″W (33.980098, -81.140291), 8 miles (13 km) west of downtown Columbia, the state capital. It is bordered to the east by West Columbia and to the southeast by Springdale. U.S. Route 1 (Augusta Road) is the main road through Oak Grove; it leads east (northbound) into Columbia and west (southbound) 5 miles (8 km) to Lexington, the county seat.

According to the United States Census Bureau, the CDP has a total area of 6.4 square miles (16.7 km^{2}), of which 0.02 square miles (0.04 km^{2}), or 0.26%, are water.

== Demographics ==
Historical population
Census	Pop.	Note	%±
2020	12,899		—
U.S. Decennial Census

=== 2020 census ===
As of the 2020 census, Oak Grove had a population of 12,899. The median age was 38.3 years. 23.2% of residents were under the age of 18 and 16.5% of residents were 65 years of age or older. For every 100 females there were 91.2 males, and for every 100 females age 18 and over there were 87.7 males age 18 and over.

100.0% of residents lived in urban areas, while 0.0% lived in rural areas.

There were 5,251 households in Oak Grove, of which 29.2% had children under the age of 18 living in them. Of all households, 46.3% were married-couple households, 17.5% were households with a male householder and no spouse or partner present, and 29.8% were households with a female householder and no spouse or partner present. About 27.9% of all households were made up of individuals and 11.1% had someone living alone who was 65 years of age or older. There were 2,640 families residing in the CDP.

There were 5,693 housing units, of which 7.8% were vacant. The homeowner vacancy rate was 2.0% and the rental vacancy rate was 10.3%.

Oak Grove racial composition
Race	Num.	Perc.
White (non-Hispanic)	8,904	69.03%
Black or African American (non-Hispanic)	1,580	12.25%
Native American	35	0.27%
Asian	250	1.94%
Pacific Islander	1	0.01%
Other/Mixed	663	5.14%
Hispanic or Latino	1,466	11.37%

=== 2000 census ===
As of the census of 2000, there were 8,183 people, 3,368 households, and 2,320 families residing in the CDP. The population density was 1,214.2 inhabitants per square mile (468.8/km^{2}). There were 3,626 housing units at an average density of 538.0 per square mile (207.7/km^{2}). The racial makeup of the CDP was 88.45% White, 8.19% African American, 0.34% Native American, 1.03% Asian, 0.01% Pacific Islander, 0.82% from other races, and 1.16% from two or more races. Hispanic or Latino of any race were 2.25% of the population.

There were 3,368 households, out of which 32.3% had children under the age of 18 living with them, 52.9% were married couples living together, 12.7% had a female householder with no husband present, and 31.1% were non-families. 25.0% of all households were made up of individuals, and 7.9% had someone living alone who was 65 years of age or older. The average household size was 2.43 and the average family size was 2.90.

In the CDP, the population was spread out, with 24.2% under the age of 18, 7.2% from 18 to 24, 35.2% from 25 to 44, 23.6% from 45 to 64, and 9.8% who were 65 years of age or older. The median age was 36 years. For every 100 females, there were 93.7 males. For every 100 females age 18 and over, there were 91.9 males.

The median income for a household in the CDP was $42,338, and the median income for a family was $48,904. Males had a median income of $31,511 versus $25,845 for females. The per capita income for the CDP was $19,509. About 2.6% of families and 4.8% of the population were below the poverty line, including 5.3% of those under age 18 and 7.5% of those age 65 or over.
