= Pine Grove Rosenwald School =

- U.S. National Register of Historic Places
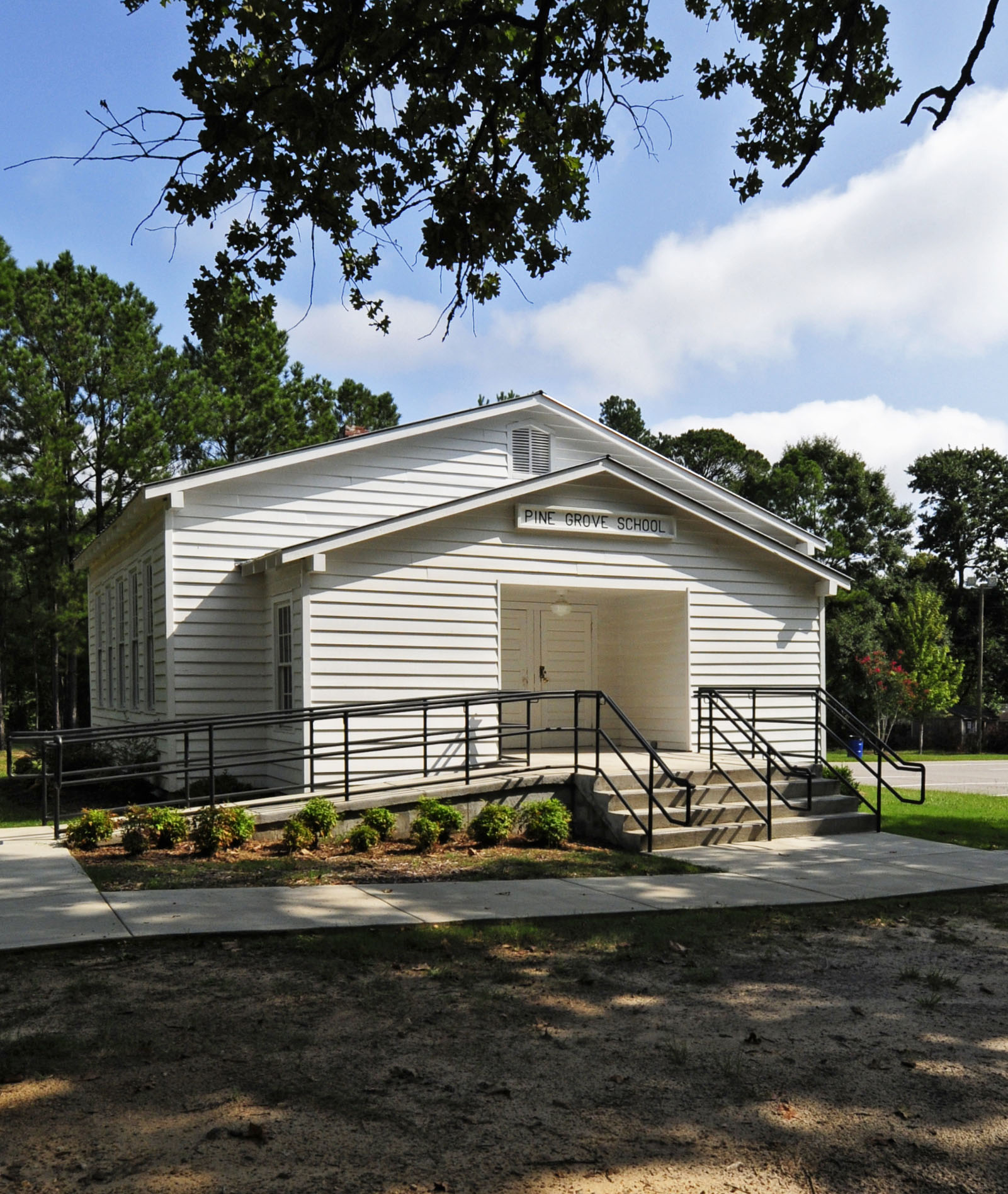
- Pine Grove Rosenwald School, September 2012

- Location within South Carolina Location within the United States
- Location: 937 Piney Woods Rd., St. Andrews, South Carolina
- Coordinates: 34°3′44″N 81°7′22″W
- Area: 3.8 acres (1.5 ha)
- Built: 1923
- Architectural style: Bungalow/craftsman
- MPS: Rosenwald School Building Program in South Carolina, 1917-1932
- NRHP reference No.: 08001397
- Added to NRHP: January 29, 2009

Pine Grove Rosenwald School, also known as Pine Grove Colored School, is a historic Rosenwald school building and former black school, located at St. Andrews, Richland County, South Carolina. It was added to the National Register of Historic Places in 2009.

It was built in 1923, and is a one-story, rectangular gable-front frame building. Its layout is a variant of the two-room schoolhouse and features large banks of tall narrow windows.
