= Seven Oaks, South Carolina =

- Census-designated place
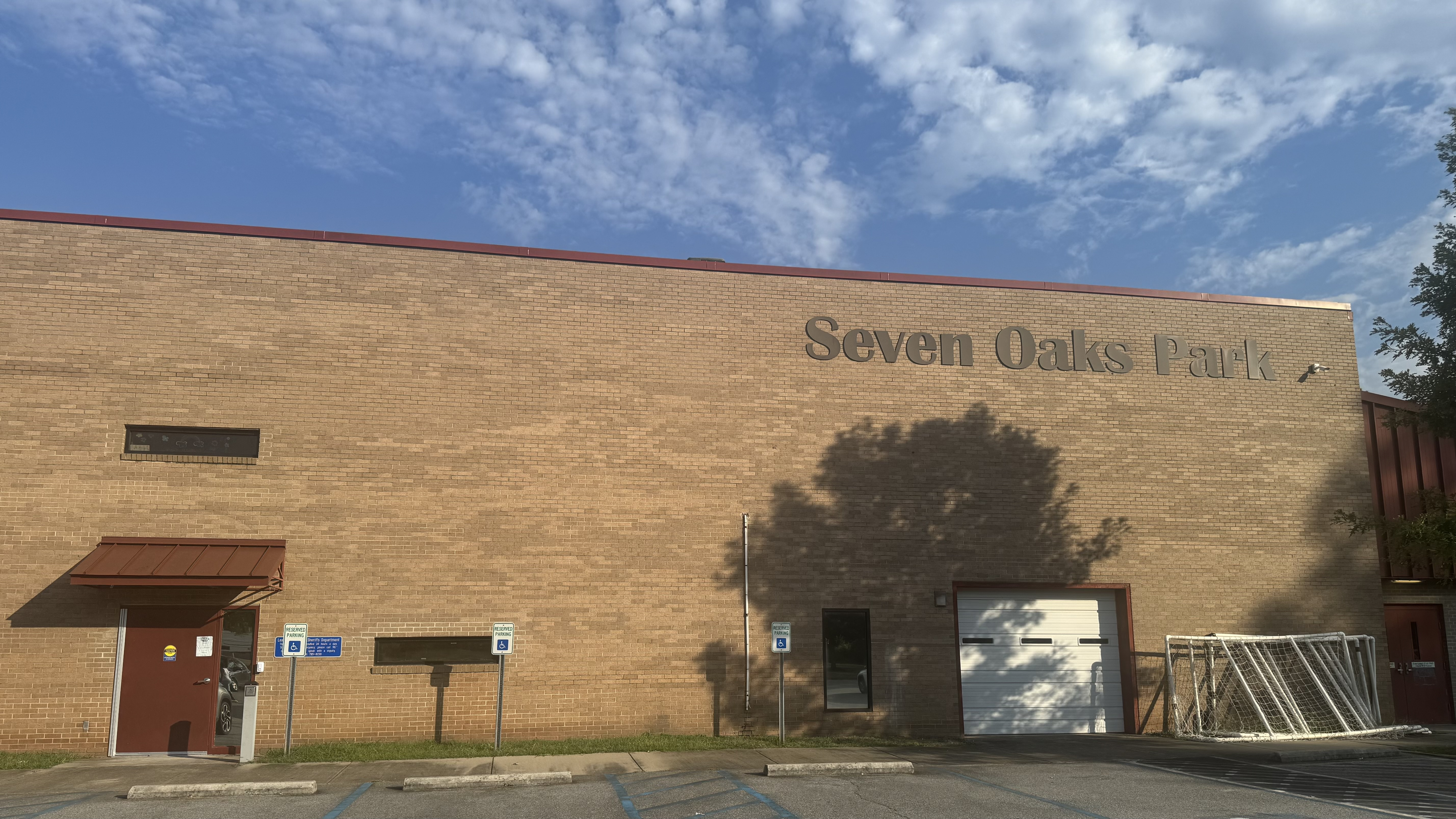
- Seven Oaks Park Building

- Location in South Carolina Location in the United States
- Coordinates: 34°02′56″N 81°08′47″W
- Country: United States
- State: South Carolina
- County: Lexington

Area
  - Total: 7.76 sq mi (20.11 km^{2})
  - Land: 7.65 sq mi (19.82 km^{2})
  - Water: 0.12 sq mi (0.30 km^{2})
- Elevation: 217 ft (66 m)

Population (2020)
  - Total: 14,652
  - Density: 1,914.8/sq mi (739.32/km^{2})
- Time zone: UTC−5 (Eastern (EST))
  - Summer (DST): UTC−4 (EDT)
- Postal codes: 29210, 29212 (Columbia)
- FIPS code: 45-65207
- GNIS feature ID: 1867530

Seven Oaks is a census-designated place (CDP) in Lexington County, South Carolina, United States with a Columbia postal address. It is 8 miles (13 km) northwest of Downtown Columbia. The population of the CDP was 15,144 at the 2010 census. It is part of the Columbia Metropolitan Statistical Area.

== Geography ==
Seven Oaks is located in northeastern Lexington County and is bordered to the northwest by the town of Irmo, to the southeast by Columbia and West Columbia, and to the northeast by unincorporated St. Andrews in neighboring Richland County. The CDP contains the neighborhoods of Challedon, Whitehall, Grenadier, and Woodland Hills.

I-26 runs through the northeast side of Seven Oaks, with access from Exit 104 (Piney Grove Road) and Exit 106 (Saint Andrews Road). I-20 passes through the southern part of the community, with access from Exit 63 (Bush River Road). I-26 and I-20 intersect at an interchange on the eastern border of the community.

According to the United States Census Bureau, the Seven Oaks CDP has a total area of 7.7 square miles (20.0 km^{2}), of which 7.6 square miles (19.8 km^{2}) are land and 0.1 square miles (0.3 km^{2}), or 1.47%, are water. The Saluda River forms the southwest border of the CDP.

== Demographics ==
Historical population
Census	Pop.	Note	%±
2020	14,652		—
U.S. Decennial Census

=== 2020 census ===
As of the 2020 census, Seven Oaks had a population of 14,652. The median age was 39.9 years. 21.0% of residents were under the age of 18 and 20.4% were 65 years of age or older. For every 100 females, there were 85.9 males, and for every 100 females age 18 and over, there were 82.0 males.

99.9% of residents lived in urban areas, while 0.1% lived in rural areas.

There were 6,324 households and 4,174 families residing in the CDP, of which 26.8% had children under the age of 18 living in them. Of all households, 37.8% were married-couple households, 19.2% had a male householder with no spouse or partner present, and 36.7% had a female householder with no spouse or partner present. About 32.8% of all households were made up of individuals, and 13.6% had someone living alone who was 65 years of age or older.

There were 6,894 housing units, of which 8.3% were vacant. The homeowner vacancy rate was 2.0% and the rental vacancy rate was 10.4%.

Seven Oaks racial composition
Race	Num.	Perc.
White (non-Hispanic)	7,410	50.57%
Black or African American (non-Hispanic)	5,223	35.65%
Native American	31	0.21%
Asian	438	2.99%
Pacific Islander	47	0.32%
Other/Mixed	710	4.85%
Hispanic or Latino	793	5.41%

=== 2000 census ===
At the 2000 census there were 15,755 people, 6,633 households, and 4,324 families living in the CDP. The population density was 2,007.9 inhabitants per square mile (775.3/km^{2}). There were 6,979 housing units at an average density of 889.4 per square mile (343.4/km^{2}). The racial makeup of the CDP was 73.51% White, 21.50% African American, 0.33% Native American, 2.81% Asian, 0.06% Pacific Islander, 0.58% from other races, and 1.21% from two or more races. Hispanic or Latino of any race were 1.89%.

Of the 6,633 households 30.4% had children under the age of 18 living with them, 50.5% were married couples living together, 11.8% had a female householder with no husband present, and 34.8% were non-families. 27.9% of households were one person and 6.8% were one person aged 65 or older. The average household size was 2.35 and the average family size was 2.89.

The age distribution was 23.3% under the age of 18, 9.5% from 18 to 24, 30.7% from 25 to 44, 25.2% from 45 to 64, and 11.3% 65 or older. The median age was 36 years. For every 100 females, there were 89.0 males. For every 100 females age 18 and over, there were 85.1 males.

The median household income was $47,019 and the median family income was $58,890. Males had a median income of $37,508 versus $27,940 for females. The per capita income for the CDP was $22,388. About 4.6% of families and 6.8% of the population were below the poverty line, including 11.3% of those under age 18 and 4.8% of those age 65 or over.
