= Summit, South Carolina =

- Town
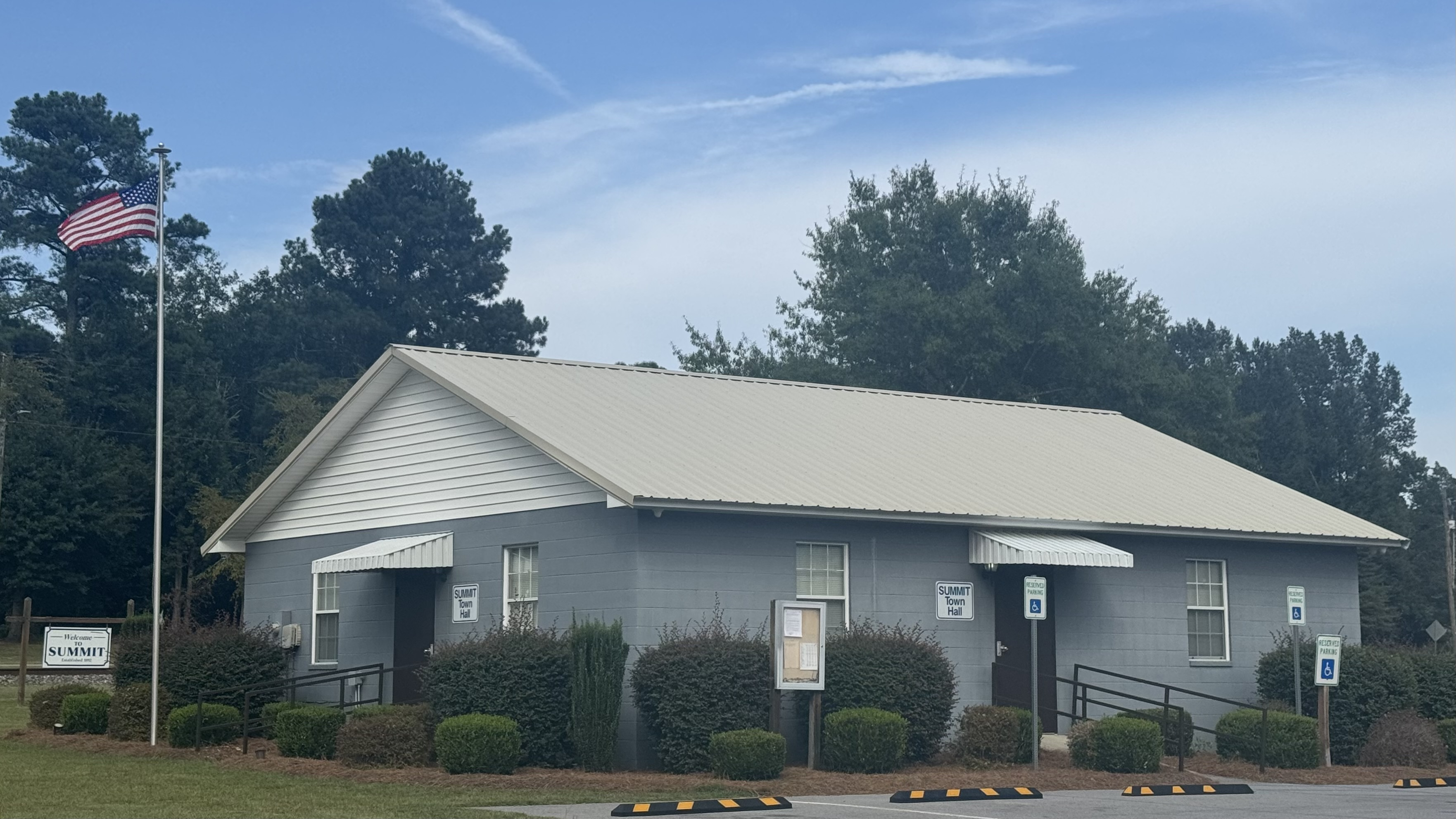
- Summit Town Hall

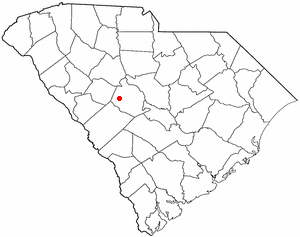
- Location of Summit, South Carolina
- Coordinates: 33°55′29″N 81°25′21″W
- Country: United States
- State: South Carolina
- County: Lexington

Area
  - Total: 1.49 sq mi (3.86 km^{2})
  - Land: 1.49 sq mi (3.86 km^{2})
  - Water: 0 sq mi (0.00 km^{2})
- Elevation: 607 ft (185 m)

Population (2020)
  - Total: 423
  - Density: 284.1/sq mi (109.69/km^{2})
- Time zone: UTC-5 (Eastern (EST))
  - Summer (DST): UTC-4 (EDT)
- ZIP code: 29070 (Leesville)
- Area codes: 803, 839
- FIPS code: 45-70315
- GNIS feature ID: 2406685

Summit is a town in Lexington County, South Carolina, United States. As of the 2020 census, Summit had a population of 423. It is part of the Columbia, South Carolina Metropolitan Statistical Area.

== Geography ==
According to the United States Census Bureau, the town has a total area of 1.5 square miles (3.9 km^{2}), all land. The adjacent town of Gilbert is located directly east of Summit.

== Demographics ==
Historical population
| Census | Pop. | Note | %± |
|---|---|---|---|
| 1880 | 57 | | — |
| 1910 | 87 | | — |
| 1920 | 89 | | 2.3% |
| 1930 | 66 | | −25.8% |
| 1940 | 73 | | 10.6% |
| 1950 | 105 | | 43.8% |
| 1960 | 108 | | 2.9% |
| 1970 | 130 | | 20.4% |
| 1980 | 172 | | 32.3% |
| 1990 | 242 | | 40.7% |
| 2000 | 219 | | −9.5% |
| 2010 | 402 | | 83.6% |
| 2020 | 423 | | 5.2% |
U.S. Decennial Census

As of the census of 2000, there were 219 people, 92 households, and 65 families residing in the town. The population density was 145.3 inhabitants per square mile (56.1/km^{2}). There were 103 housing units at an average density of 68.3 per square mile (26.4/km^{2}). The racial makeup of the town was 88.13% White, 9.59% African American, 1.83% Native American, and 0.46% from two or more races. Hispanic or Latino of any race were 0.46% of the population.

There were 92 households, out of which 34.8% had children under the age of 18 living with them, 55.4% were married couples living together, 10.9% had a female householder with no husband present, and 28.3% were non-families. 23.9% of all households were made up of individuals, and 6.5% had someone living alone who was 65 years of age or older. The average household size was 2.38 and the average family size was 2.83.

In the town, the population was spread out, with 23.3% under the age of 18, 9.1% from 18 to 24, 29.2% from 25 to 44, 27.9% from 45 to 64, and 10.5% who were 65 years of age or older. The median age was 40 years. For every 100 females, there were 92.1 males. For every 100 females age 18 and over, there were 86.7 males.

The median income for a household in the town was $32,083, and the median income for a family was $35,625. Males had a median income of $27,500 versus $20,000 for females. The per capita income for the town was $15,456. About 9.6% of families and 6.3% of the population were below the poverty line, including 5.7% of those under the age of eighteen and none of those 65 or over.

== Education ==
Public education in Summit is administered by Lexington School District 1. The town is zoned for Centerville Elementary School, Gilbert Elementary School, Gilbert Middle School, and Gilbert High School, all of which are in Gilbert.

The Gilbert-Summit Branch of the Lexington County Public Library serves both communities.
