= State Park, South Carolina =

- Unincorporated community
- Location within South Carolina Location within the United States
- Coordinates: 34°05′27″N 80°57′58″W
- Country: United States
- State: South Carolina
- County: Richland
- Elevation: 364 ft (111 m)
- Time zone: UTC-5 (Eastern (EST))
  - Summer (DST): UTC-4 (EDT)
- ZIP code: 29147
- Area codes: 803, 839
- GNIS feature ID: 1231825

State Park is an unincorporated community in Richland County, South Carolina, United States. The community is located in a suburban area 7.3 miles (11.7 km) northeast of Columbia. State Park has a post office with ZIP code 29147.
