= 1980 United States Senate election in South Carolina =

- November 4, 1980
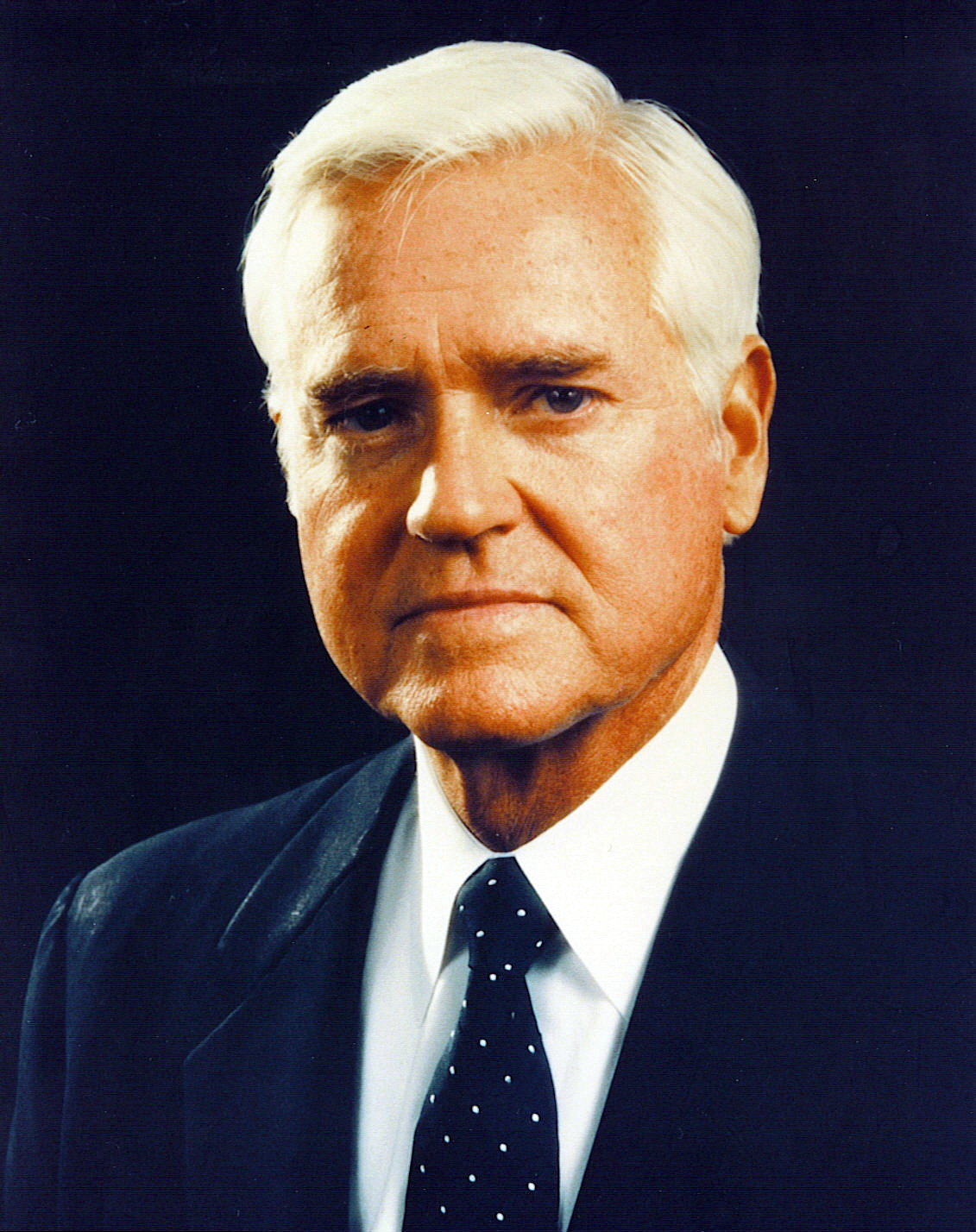

Nominee	Ernest Hollings	Marshall Mays
Party	Democratic	Republican
Popular vote	612,556	257,946
Percentage	70.36%	29.63%
- County results Hollings: 50–60% 60–70% 70–80% 80–90%
U.S. senator before election
Ernest Hollings
Democratic
Elected U.S. Senator
Ernest Hollings
Democratic

The 1980 South Carolina United States Senate election was held on November 4, 1980, to select the U.S. Senator from the state of South Carolina. Incumbent Democratic Senator Fritz Hollings easily defeated Republican challenger Marshall Mays to win his fourth (his third full) term.

== Democratic primary ==
The South Carolina Democratic Party held their primary for Senator on June 10, 1980. Fritz Hollings, the incumbent Senator, won the Democratic primary against two minor candidates; Nettie Durant Dickerson and William Kreml.

Democratic Primary
Candidate	Votes	%
Fritz Hollings	266,796	81.2%
Nettie Durant Dickerson	34,720	10.6%
William P. Kreml	27,049	8.2%

== Republican primary ==
The South Carolina Republican Party held their primary on June 10, 1980. Marshall Mays, a former state legislator, emerged as the frontrunner and went on to defeat Charlie Rhodes in the runoff election on June 24.

Republican Primary
Candidate	Votes	%
Marshall Mays	14,075	42.6%
Charlie Rhodes	11,395	34.5%
Robert Carley	7,575	22.9%

Republican Primary Runoff
Candidate	Votes	%	±%
Marshall Mays	6,853	64.8%	+22.2%
Charlie Rhodes	3,717	35.2%	+0.7%

== General election campaign ==
The Republican Party did not see the race as winnable and Mays received little assistance for his campaign. Hollings did little campaigning for the race and easily won re-election in the midst of an otherwise strong Republican year.

== General election results ==
South Carolina U.S. Senate Election, 1980
Party	Candidate	Votes	%	±%
Democratic	Fritz Hollings (incumbent)	612,556	70.36%	+0.92%
Republican	Marshall Mays	257,946	29.63%	+0.95%
No party	Write-Ins	94	0.01%	N/A
Majority		354,610	40.73%	−0.03%
Turnout		870,596	70.5%	+19.2%
Democratic hold				

== See also ==
- 1980 United States Senate elections
- List of United States senators from South Carolina
