= Lexington County, South Carolina =

County in South Carolina, United States

- County
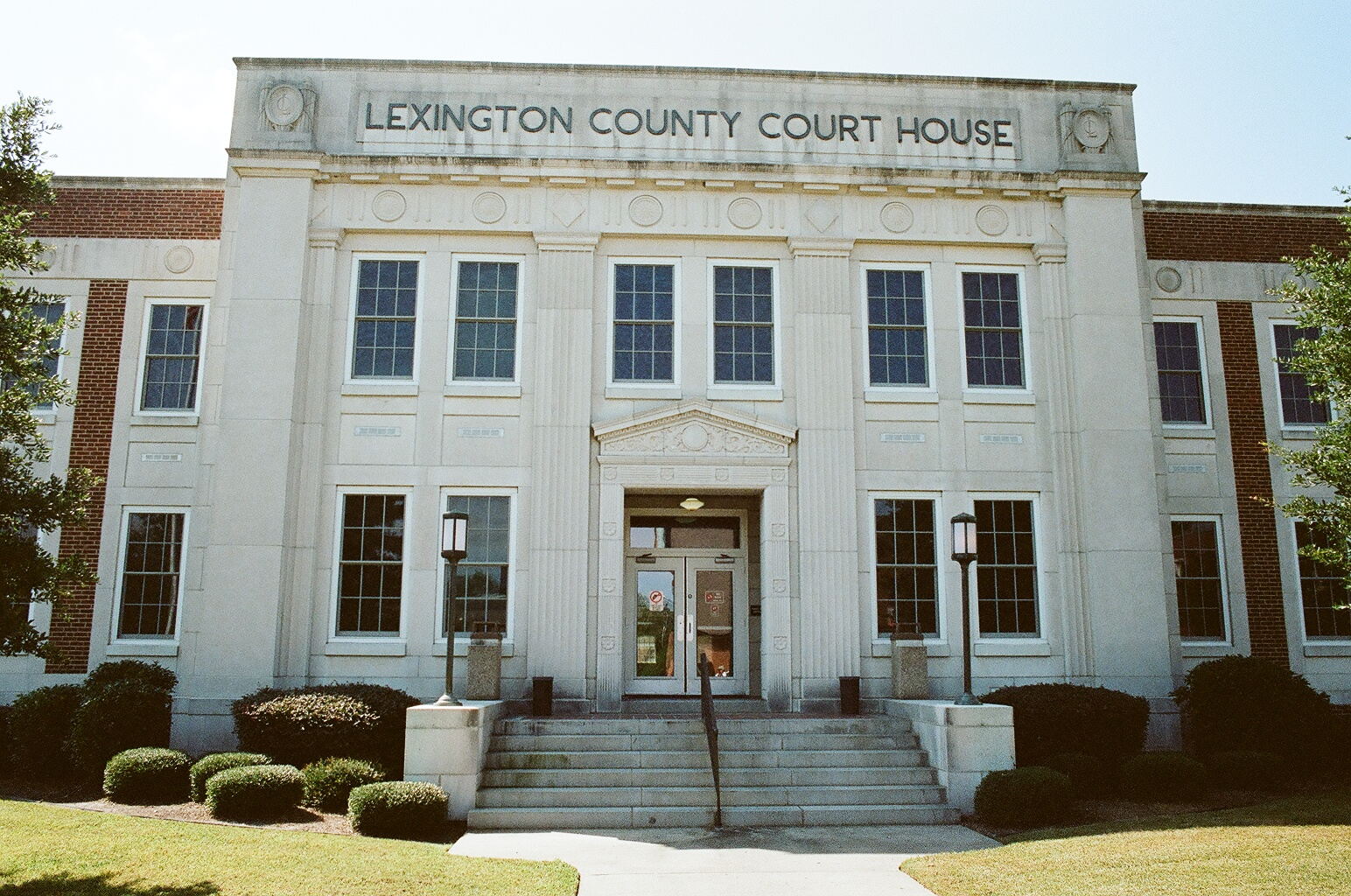
- Lexington County Courthouse

- Flag Seal
- Motto: "Grow with us"
- Location within the U.S. state of South Carolina
- Interactive map of Lexington County, South Carolina
- Coordinates: 33.90°N 81.27°W
- Country: United States
- State: South Carolina
- Founded: 1785
- Named for: Battle of Lexington and Concord
- Seat: Lexington
- Largest community: Lexington

Area
  - Total: 757.62 sq mi (1,962.2 km^{2})
  - Land: 699.00 sq mi (1,810.4 km^{2})
  - Water: 58.62 sq mi (151.8 km^{2}) 7.74%

Population (2020)
  - Total: 293,991
  - Estimate (2025): 317,588 ▲
  - Density: 420.59/sq mi (162.39/km^{2})
- Time zone: UTC−5 (Eastern)
  - Summer (DST): UTC−4 (EDT)
- Congressional district: 2nd
- Website: www.lex-co.sc.gov

Lexington County is a county located in the U.S. state of South Carolina. As of the 2020 census, the population was 293,991. Its county seat and largest community is Lexington. The county was chartered in 1785 and was named in commemoration of Lexington, Massachusetts, the site of the Battle of Lexington in the American Revolutionary War. Lexington County is the sixth-most populous county in South Carolina by population and is part of the Columbia, SC Metropolitan Statistical Area. It is located in the Midlands region of South Carolina.

== History ==
Lexington County was charted in 1785 and was named after the Battles of Lexington and Concord, fought at the outset of the American Revolutionary War.

== Geography ==
According to the U.S. Census Bureau, the county has a total area of 757.62 square miles (1,962.2 km^{2}), of which 699.00 square miles (1,810.4 km^{2}) is land and 58.62 square miles (151.8 km^{2}) (7.74%) is water. The largest body of water is Lake Murray, while other waterways include the Broad River, the Saluda River and the Congaree River. Lexington County has urban, suburban, and rural landscapes. Much of the county's urbanization is in its eastern and northeastern areas. The elevation in the county is 392 feet (119 m).

=== Climate ===
Lexington County averages 47 inches (1,200 mm) of rain per year; the U.S. average is 38 inches (970 mm). The average snowfall is 1 inch (25 mm); the U.S. average is 28 inches (710 mm). The average number of days with any measurable precipitation is 103.

On average, there are 218 sunny days per year in Lexington County. The July high is around 92.3 °F (33.5 °C) and the January low is 33.2 °F (0.7 °C). The comfort index rates the county a 7.3 out of 10, where higher is more comfortable. The U.S. average on the comfort index is a 7 out of 10.

=== State and local protected areas ===
- Congaree Creek Heritage Preserve
- Lake Murray Dam North Recreational Area
- Peachtree Rock Heritage Preserve
- Saluda Shoals Park
- Shealy's Pond Heritage Preserve

=== Major water bodies ===
- Congaree River
- Lake Murray
- North Fork Edisto River
- Red Bank Creek
- Saluda River

=== Adjacent counties ===
- Richland County – east
- Orangeburg County – southeast
- Calhoun County – southeast
- Aiken County – southwest
- Saluda County – west
- Newberry County – northwest

== Demographics ==
Historical population
Census	Pop.	Note	%±
1810	6,641		—
1820	8,083		21.7%
1830	9,065		12.1%
1840	12,111		33.6%
1850	12,930		6.8%
1860	15,579		20.5%
1870	12,988		−16.6%
1880	18,564		42.9%
1890	22,181		19.5%
1900	27,264		22.9%
1910	32,040		17.5%
1920	35,676		11.3%
1930	36,494		2.3%
1940	35,994		−1.4%
1950	44,279		23.0%
1960	60,726		37.1%
1970	89,012		46.6%
1980	140,353		57.7%
1990	167,611		19.4%
2000	216,014		28.9%
2010	262,391		21.5%
2020	293,991		12.0%
2025 (est.)	317,588	▲	8.0%
U.S. Decennial Census; 1790–1960 1900–1990; 1990–2000 2010 2020

=== Racial and ethnic composition ===
Lexington County, South Carolina – Racial and ethnic composition Note: the US Census treats Hispanic/Latino as an ethnic category. This table excludes Latinos from the racial categories and assigns them to a separate category. Hispanics/Latinos may be of any race.
Race / Ethnicity (NH = Non-Hispanic)	Pop 1980	Pop 1990	Pop 2000	Pop 2010	Pop 2020	% 1980	% 1990	% 2000	% 2010	% 2020
White alone (NH)	124,757	146,535	179,731	201,946	208,854	88.89%	87.43%	83.20%	76.96%	71.04%
Black or African American alone (NH)	13,709	18,427	27,132	36,995	42,382	9.77%	10.99%	12.56%	14.10%	14.42%
Native American or Alaska Native alone (NH)	192	321	690	957	894	0.14%	0.19%	0.32%	0.36%	0.30%
Asian alone (NH)	639	997	2,248	3,693	6,644	0.46%	0.59%	1.04%	1.41%	2.26%
Native Hawaiian or Pacific Islander alone (NH)	x	x	66	105	185	x	x	0.03%	0.04%	0.06%
Other race alone (NH)	102	29	170	330	1,089	0.07%	0.02%	0.08%	0.13%	0.37%
Mixed race or Multiracial (NH)	x	x	1,831	3,836	12,146	x	x	0.85%	1.46%	4.13%
Hispanic or Latino (any race)	954	1,302	4,146	14,529	21,797	0.68%	0.78%	1.92%	5.54%	7.41%
Total	140,353	167,611	216,014	262,391	293,991	100.00%	100.00%	100.00%	100.00%	100.00%

=== 2020 census ===
As of the 2020 census, there were 293,991 people, 118,193 households, and 81,118 families residing in the county. The median age was 39.8 years, 23.3% of residents were under the age of 18, and 17.3% were 65 years of age or older. For every 100 females there were 94.2 males, and for every 100 females age 18 and over there were 91.3 males in the county.

The racial makeup of the county was 72.3% White, 14.6% Black or African American, 0.5% American Indian and Alaska Native, 2.3% Asian, 0.1% Native Hawaiian and Pacific Islander, 3.6% from some other race, and 6.6% from two or more races. Hispanic or Latino residents of any race comprised 7.4% of the population.

74.8% of residents lived in urban areas, while 25.2% lived in rural areas.

There were 116,720 households in the county, of which 31.5% had children under the age of 18 living with them and 27.1% had a female householder with no spouse or partner present. About 26.3% of all households were made up of individuals and 10.7% had someone living alone who was 65 years of age or older.

There were 127,887 housing units, of which 8.7% were vacant. Among occupied housing units, 75.8% were owner-occupied and 24.2% were renter-occupied. The homeowner vacancy rate was 1.5% and the rental vacancy rate was 8.8%.

=== 2010 census ===
At the 2010 census, there were 262,391 people, 102,733 households, and 70,952 families living in the county. The population density was 375.4 inhabitants per square mile (144.9 inhabitants/km^{2}). There were 113,957 housing units at an average density of 163.0 units per square mile (62.9 units/km^{2}). The racial makeup of the county was 79.3% white, 14.3% black or African American, 1.4% Asian, 0.4% American Indian, 2.7% from other races, and 1.9% from two or more races. Those of Hispanic or Latino origin made up 5.5% of the population. In terms of ancestry, 17.2% were German, 14.0% were American, 12.5% were English, and 11.8% were Irish.

Of the 102,733 households, 34.5% had children under the age of 18 living with them, 51.4% were married couples living together, 13.0% had a female householder with no husband present, 30.9% were non-families, and 24.9% of all households were made up of individuals. The average household size was 2.53 and the average family size was 3.01. The median age was 37.9 years.

The median income for a household in the county was $52,205 and the median income for a family was $64,630. Males had a median income of $44,270 versus $34,977 for females. The per capita income for the county was $26,393. About 8.5% of families and 11.1% of the population were below the poverty line, including 15.7% of those under age 18 and 8.4% of those age 65 or over.

=== 2000 census ===
At the 2000 census, there were 216,014 people, 83,240 households, and 59,849 families living in the county. The population density was 309 people per square mile (119 people/km^{2}). There were 90,978 housing units at an average density of 130 units per square mile (50 units/km^{2}). The racial makeup of the county was 84.18% White, 12.63% Black or African American, 0.34% Native American, 1.05% Asian, 0.04% Pacific Islander, 0.79% from other races, and 0.98% from two or more races. 1.92% of the population were Hispanic or Latino of any race.

There were 83,240 households, out of which 35.50% had children under the age of 18 living with them, 56.60% were married couples living together, 11.60% had a female householder with no husband present, and 28.10% were non-families. 22.50% of all households were made up of individuals, and 6.90% had someone living alone who was 65 years of age or older. The average household size was 2.56 and the average family size was 3.01.

In the county, 26.10% of the population was under the age of 18, 8.30% was from 18 to 24, 31.60% from 25 to 44, 23.80% from 45 to 64, and 10.20% was 65 years of age or older. The median age was 36 years. For every 100 females, there were 94.50 males. For every 100 females age 18 and over, there were 91.30 males.

The median income for a household in the county was $44,659, and the median income for a family was $52,637. Males had a median income of $36,435 versus $26,387 for females. The per capita income for the county was $21,063. About 6.40% of families and 9.00% of the population were below the poverty line, including 11.10% of those under age 18 and 9.30% of those age 65 or over.

== Law and government ==
=== Politics ===
Lexington County was one of the first areas of South Carolina to support the Republican Party. The last official Democratic candidate to carry the county at a presidential level was Franklin D. Roosevelt in 1944, and the official Democratic candidate last won 40 percent of the county's vote in 1952. It supported splinter Dixiecrat candidates in 1948 and 1956.

In the 2020 United States presidential election, Lexington County voted 64.2% in favor of Republican Donald Trump and 34.1% in favor of Democrat Joe Biden with 72.6% of the eligible electorate voting. This was the strongest performance by a Democratic candidate for president since 1976.

United States presidential election results for Lexington County, South Carolina
Year	Republican		Democratic		Third party(ies)	
Year	No.	%	No.	%	No.	%
1892	71	4.43%	1,287	80.39%	243	15.18%
1896	197	10.54%	1,672	89.46%	0	0.00%
1900	30	2.25%	1,302	97.75%	0	0.00%
1904	60	2.44%	2,403	97.56%	0	0.00%
1908	80	3.09%	2,508	96.87%	1	0.04%
1912	3	0.24%	1,201	94.94%	61	4.82%
1916	31	1.43%	2,060	95.15%	74	3.42%
1920	59	3.15%	1,813	96.85%	0	0.00%
1924	7	0.50%	1,395	99.36%	2	0.14%
1928	61	4.73%	1,228	95.27%	0	0.00%
1932	5	3.40%	141	95.92%	1	0.68%
1936	32	1.47%	2,138	98.53%	0	0.00%
1940	17	1.12%	1,496	98.88%	0	0.00%
1944	20	0.94%	1,986	93.68%	114	5.38%
1948	58	2.03%	566	19.78%	2,237	78.19%
1952	4,018	53.35%	3,513	46.65%	0	0.00%
1956	1,188	20.71%	2,094	36.50%	2,455	42.79%
1960	6,511	61.02%	4,159	38.98%	0	0.00%
1964	12,041	71.47%	4,807	28.53%	0	0.00%
1968	12,204	48.49%	4,058	16.12%	8,907	35.39%
1972	25,327	84.75%	4,069	13.62%	490	1.64%
1976	21,442	59.43%	14,339	39.75%	296	0.82%
1980	28,313	67.60%	12,334	29.45%	1,239	2.96%
1984	38,628	80.95%	8,828	18.50%	265	0.56%
1988	41,467	77.89%	11,366	21.35%	405	0.76%
1992	41,759	60.50%	18,312	26.53%	8,951	12.97%
1996	39,658	63.23%	18,907	30.15%	4,155	6.62%
2000	58,095	69.93%	22,830	27.48%	2,156	2.60%
2004	67,132	71.85%	25,393	27.18%	907	0.97%
2008	74,960	68.45%	33,303	30.41%	1,249	1.14%
2012	76,662	68.07%	34,148	30.32%	1,813	1.61%
2016	80,026	65.55%	35,230	28.86%	6,837	5.60%
2020	92,817	64.20%	49,301	34.10%	2,450	1.69%
2024	96,965	66.01%	47,815	32.55%	2,123	1.45%

The county's Republican bent is not limited to national politics; its voters frequently reject Democrats at the state level as well. The county most recently supported a Democrat for governor in 1982 when Richard Riley carried every county in the state. The last Democratic senatorial nominee to manage even 30 percent of the county's vote was Inez Tenenbaum in 2004, and no Democrat has carried the county since Ernest "Fritz" Hollings did so in 1980. In 1986, it was the only county in the state to support Hollings' Republican opponent, future Governor Henry McMaster.

It was one of the first areas where Republicans broke the long Democratic monopoly on state and local offices. By the 1980s, longtime state senator Nikki Setzler was the only elected Democrat left above the county level. He was succeeded in 2024 by fellow Democrat Russell Ott.

On November 4, 2014, Lexington County residents voted against a proposed sales tax increase. The money generated from this tax would have mostly been used to improve traffic conditions upon roadways. That same day, residents voted to repeal a ban on alcohol sales on Sundays within the county.

=== Law enforcement ===
In 2015, long-time county sheriff James Metts pled guilty to charges of conspiring to harbor and conceal illegal aliens. Metts accepted bribes to keep undocumented immigrants out of federal databases. Metts had been sheriff since 1972.

== Economy ==
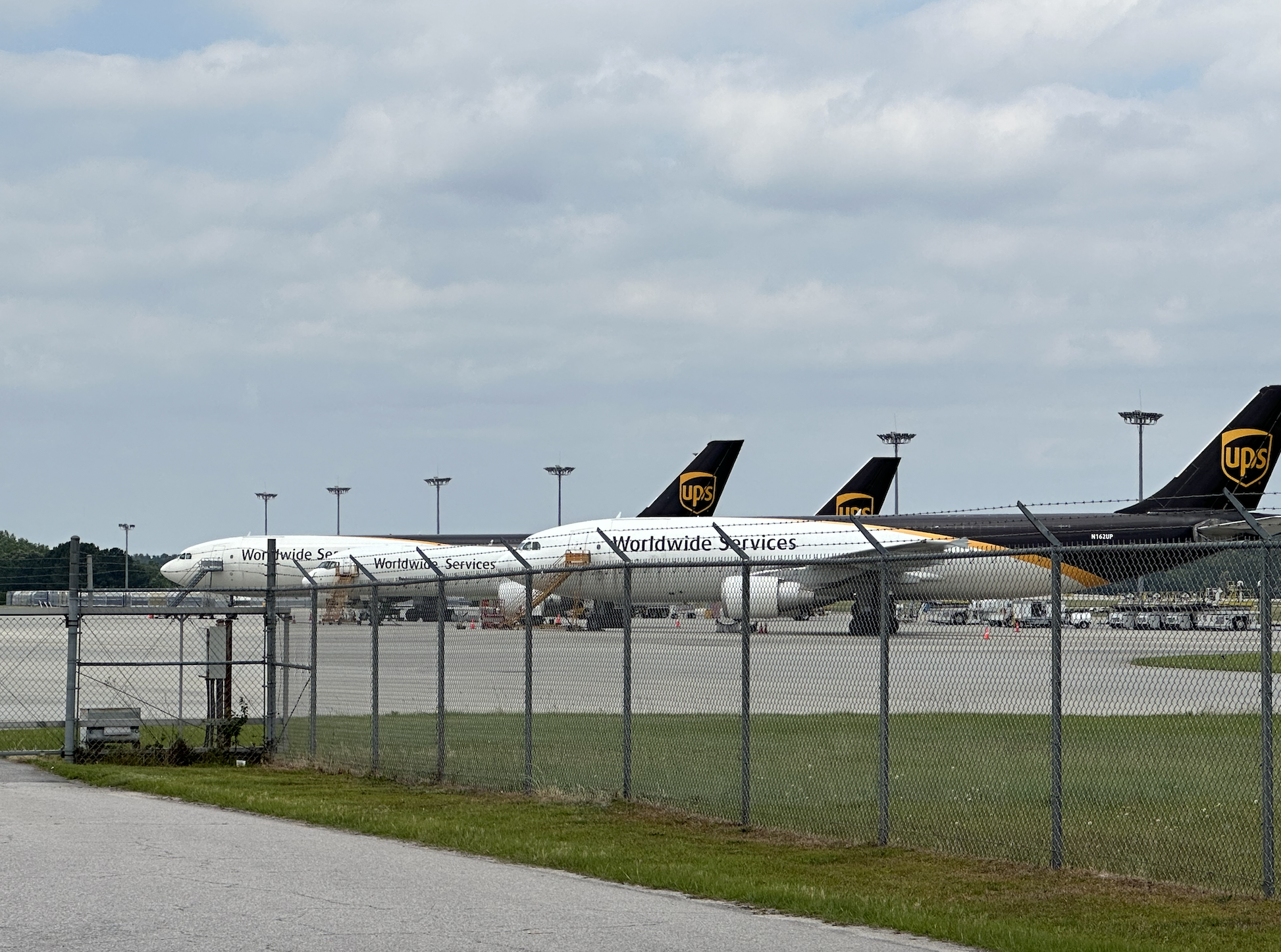
UPS Airplanes Columbia Metropolitan Airport in Lexington County

In 2022, the GDP was $16.7 billion (about $53,814 per capita), and the real GDP was $13.8 billion (about $44,563 per capita) in chained 2017 dollars.

The Saxe Gotha Industrial Park near Cayce houses multiple distribution sites for major national companies, including Amazon, Chick-fil-A, The Home Depot and Nephron Pharmaceuticals. Near Lexington is the Michelin tire-production plant. Other manufacturers include Shaw Industries, Southeastern Freight Lines, and Flex, at which president Biden spoke in July 2023.

Employment and Wage Statistics by Industry in Lexington County, South Carolina - Q3 2023
Industry	Employment Counts	Employment Percentage (%)	Average Annual Wage ($)
Accommodation and Food Services	12,892	9.9	20,436
Administrative and Support and Waste Management and Remediation Services	7,696	5.9	39,000
Agriculture, Forestry, Fishing and Hunting	608	0.5	55,432
Arts, Entertainment, and Recreation	956	0.7	23,140
Construction	7,402	5.7	62,244
Educational Services	10,238	7.9	50,596
Finance and Insurance	3,276	2.5	73,736
Health Care and Social Assistance	19,302	14.9	56,992
Information	2,252	1.7	62,972
Management of Companies and Enterprises	1,388	1.1	77,272
Manufacturing	12,343	9.5	69,108
Mining, Quarrying, and Oil and Gas Extraction	143	0.1	73,164
Other Services (except Public Administration)	4,281	3.3	48,048
Professional, Scientific, and Technical Services	4,951	3.8	71,032
Public Administration	5,240	4.0	56,004
Real Estate and Rental and Leasing	1,625	1.3	54,860
Retail Trade	18,087	13.9	34,996
Transportation and Warehousing	9,682	7.5	46,904
Utilities	1,410	1.1	92,144
Wholesale Trade	6,158	4.7	83,252
Total	129,930	100.0%	51,735

=== Top Employers ===
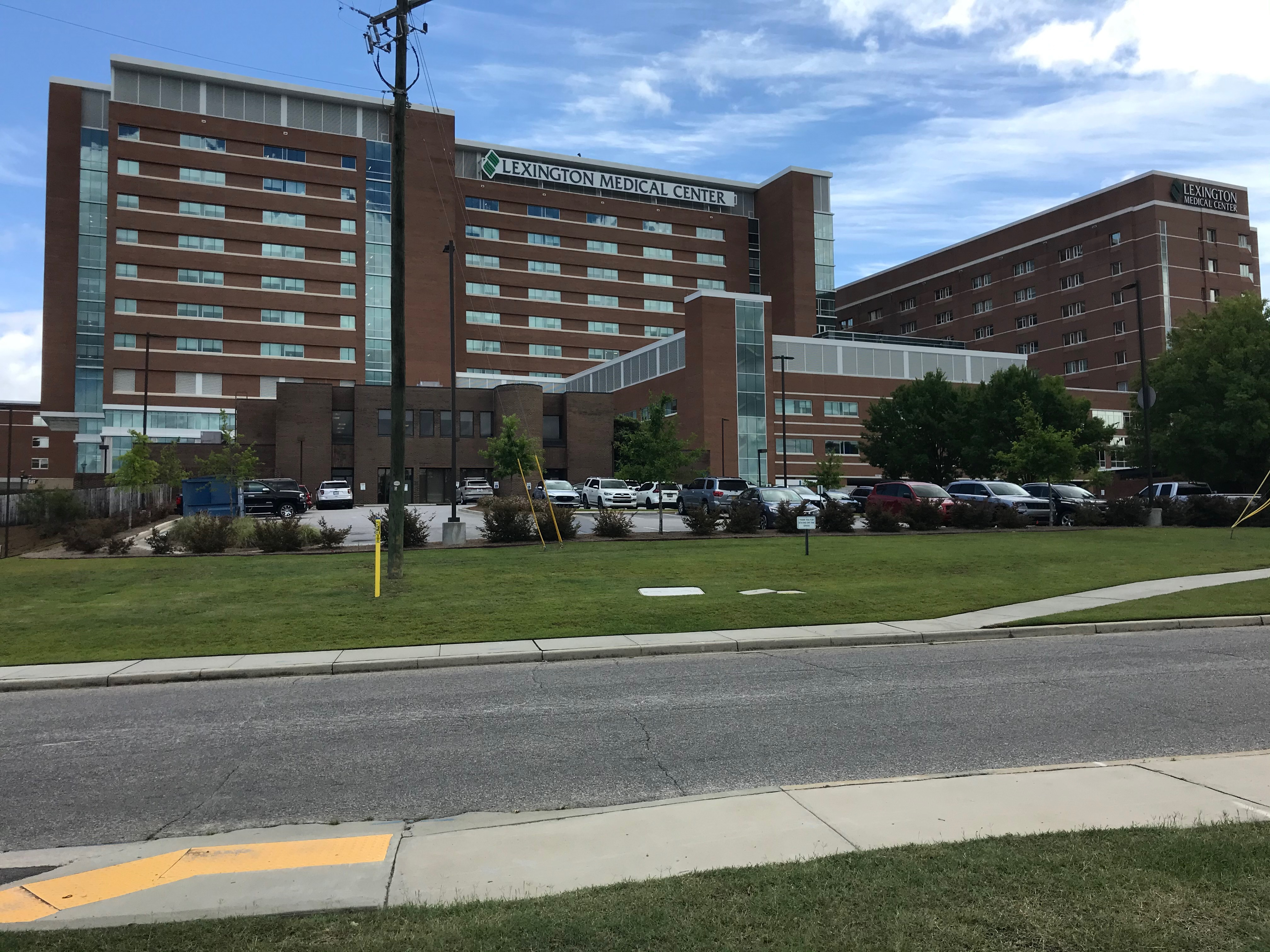
Two towers of Lexington Medical Center

Top ten employers (2021)
Rank	Employer	Employees
1	Lexington Medical Center	7,893
2	Lexington School District 1	3,674
3	Amazon	3,050
4	Walmart	2,603
5	State government	2,308
6	Michelin	2,240
7	County of Lexington	1,855
8	Dominion Energy	1,486
9	Lexington School District 2	1,274
10	Lexington School District Five	1,136

== Transportation ==
=== Interstates ===
- I-20 Interstate 20 travels from west to east and connects Columbia to Atlanta and Augusta in the west and Florence in the east. It serves the nearby towns and suburbs of Pelion, Lexington, West Columbia, Sandhill, Pontiac, and Elgin. Interstate 20 is also used by travelers heading to Myrtle Beach, although the interstate's eastern terminus is in Florence.
- I-26 Interstate 26 travels from northwest to southeast and connects the Columbia area to the other two major population centers of South Carolina: the Greenville-Spartanburg area in the Upstate and the Charleston area in the Lowcountry.
- I-77 Interstate 77 begins at its southern terminus in Cayce and ends in Cleveland, Ohio and is frequently used by travelers on the east coast heading to or from Florida.

=== U.S. Routes ===
- US 1
- US 1 Conn.
- US 176
- US 178
- US 321
- US 378

=== State Routes ===
- SC 6
- SC 6 Conn.
- SC 12
- SC 12 Conn.
- SC 113
- SC 245
- SC 302
- SC 391
- SC 602

=== Columbia Metropolitan Airport ===
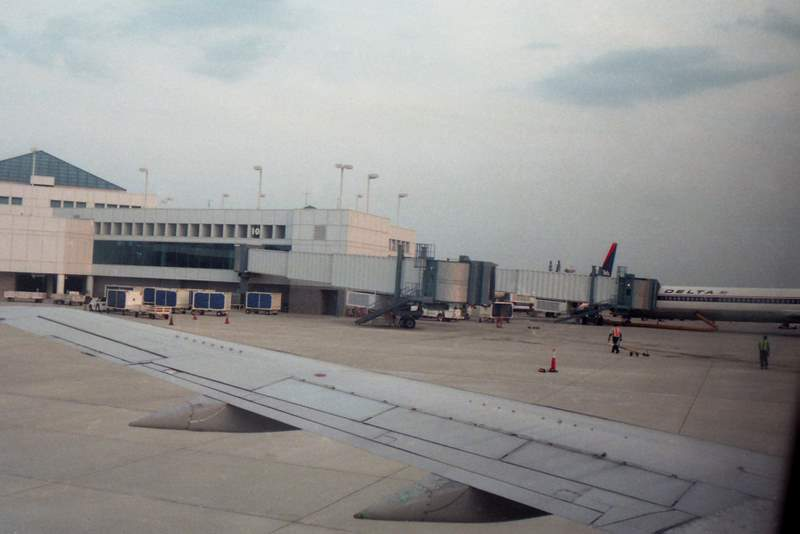
Columbia Metropolitan Airport in 1998

The Columbia Metropolitan Airport serves as the main airport system for the greater Columbia area. In 2018, the airport served 1,197,603 passengers with 12,324 flights. Additionally, the airport is also the regional hub for UPS Airlines, transporting 136.7 million pounds of freight/mail in 2018. The airport was named Lexington County Airport, and during World War II, trained pilots for North American B-25 Mitchell crews.

=== Public Transportation ===
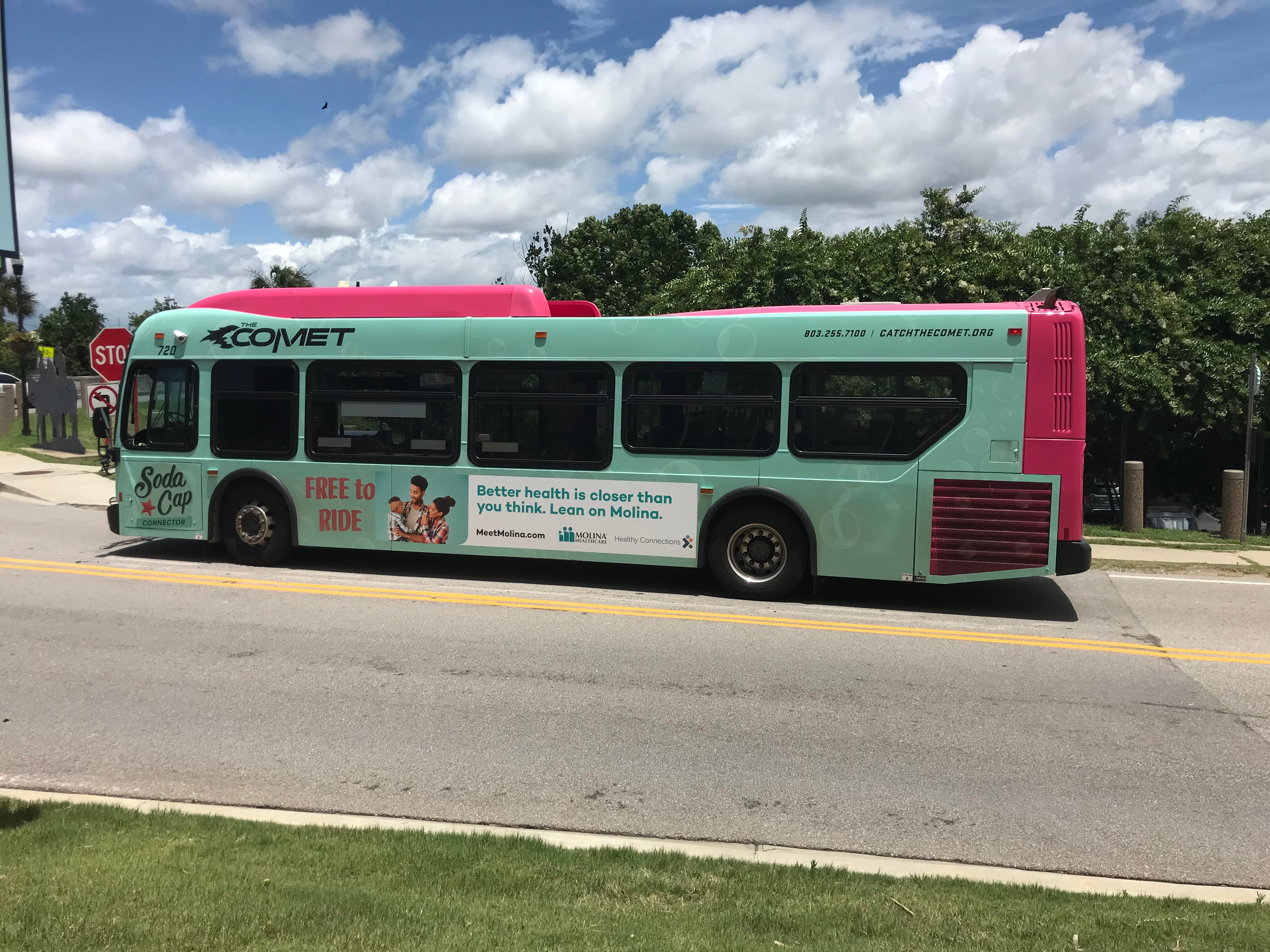
COMET Bus in West Columbia, Lexington County

Public transportation in Lexington County is provided by the COMET, or officially the Central Midlands Regional Transit Authority (CMRTA). The bus system is the main public transit system for the greater Columbia area. In Lexington County, the bus system runs in the areas of West Columbia, Cayce, Irmo, Springdale, Seven Oaks, and Harbison. Additionally, COMET offers Dial-a-ride transit (DART), which provides personalized service passengers with disabilities.

== Education ==
There are five school districts covering portions of the county.

Education in Lexington County
Public school district name	Enrollment	Teachers	Schools
Lexington County School District One	27,072	1,959	31
Lexington County School District Two	8,582	636	13
Lexington County School District Three (Note: Partly in Saluda County)	2,020	160	4
Lexington County School District Four	3,245	224	6
Lexington & Richland County School District Five (Note: Partly in Richland County)	16,780	1,332	22
Colleges	Enrollment	Campuses	
Midlands Technical College (Note: 4 of 7 campuses are in Lexington County)	15,000	4	
South Carolina State University	Under Construction	1 (Note: SCSU will open a branch in Cayce, SC in 2027.)	
Public libraries	Visitors (counted once)	Branches	
Lexington County Public Library	160,336	10	

== Attractions ==
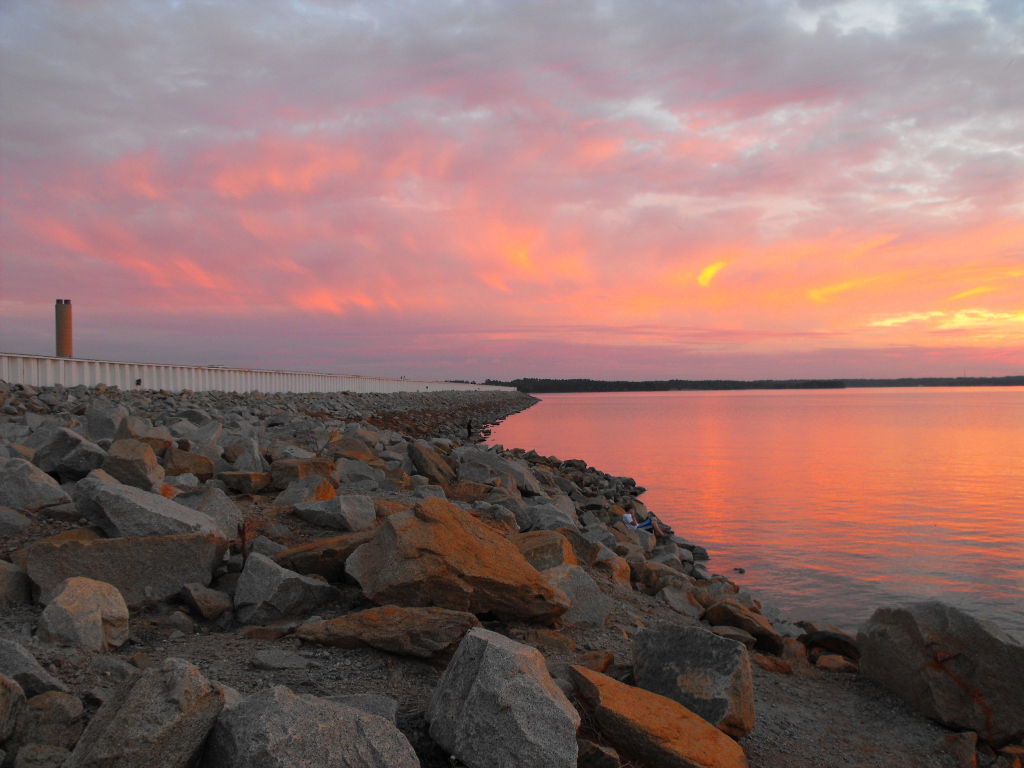
Lake Murray Dam generates electricity for the region. The lake serves as an attraction for fishing, boating, swimming, and walking.

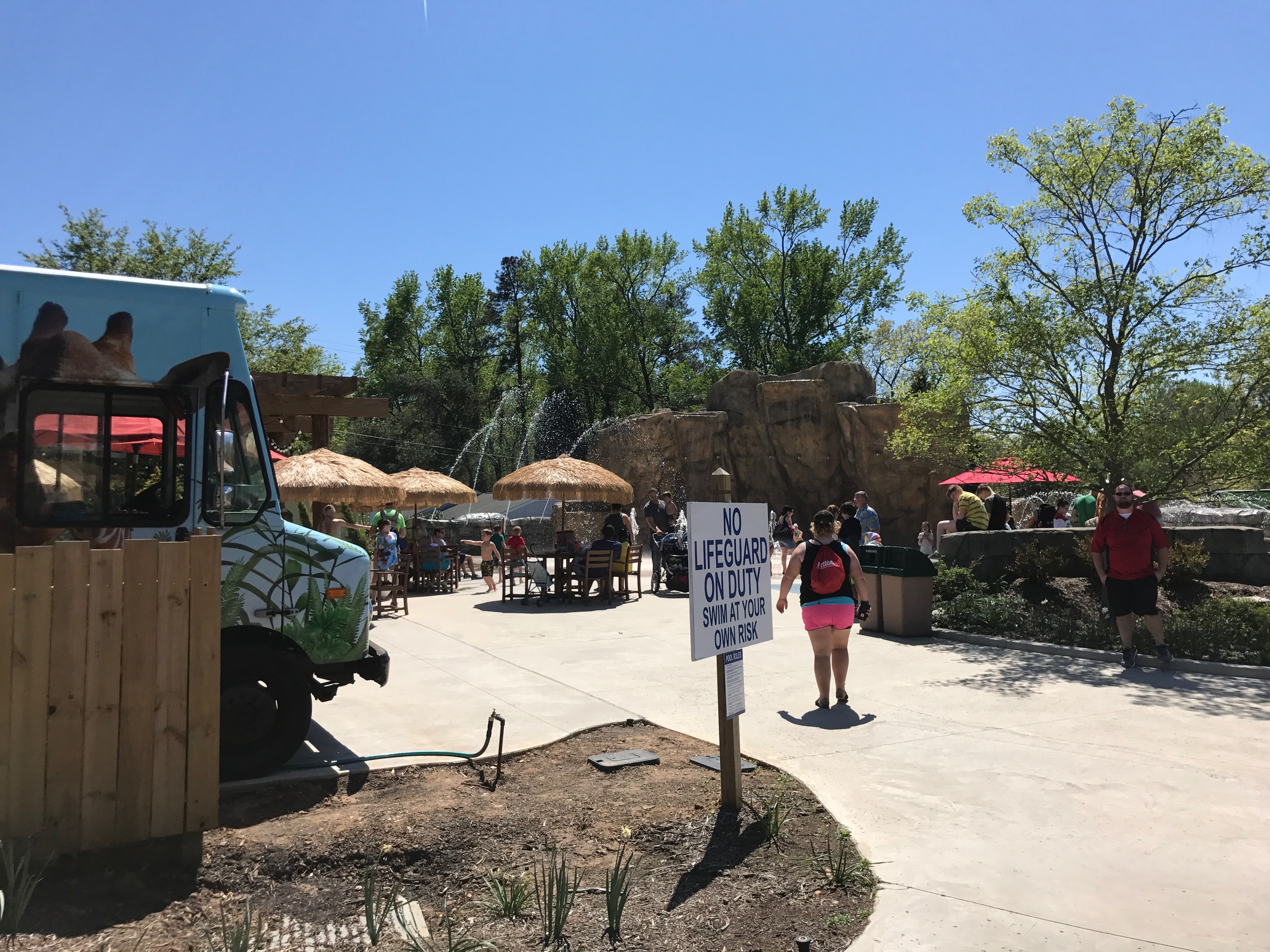
Riverbanks Zoo Waterpark (Lexington County portion)

- Lake Murray
- Riverbanks Zoo (Note: Partly in Richland County)
- Riverbanks Botanical Garden
- Riverbanks Waterfall Junction and waterpark
- Lexington County Museum
- Lake Murray Dam
- Lexington County Baseball Stadium
- Cayce-West Columbia Riverwalk
- Fourteen-mile Creek Trail
- Columbiana Centre

== Communities ==
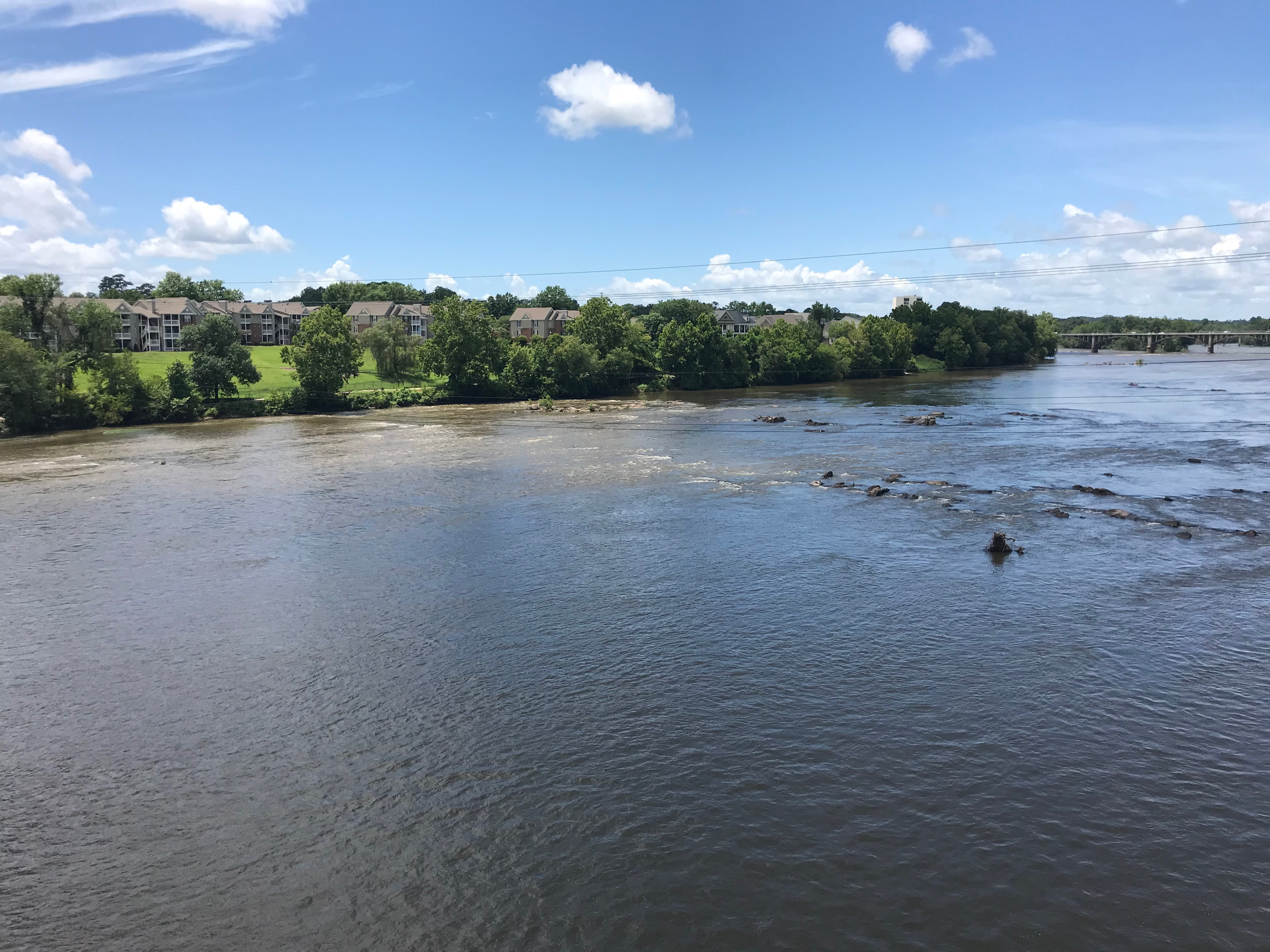
Lexington County (Cayce) from the banks of the Congaree River.

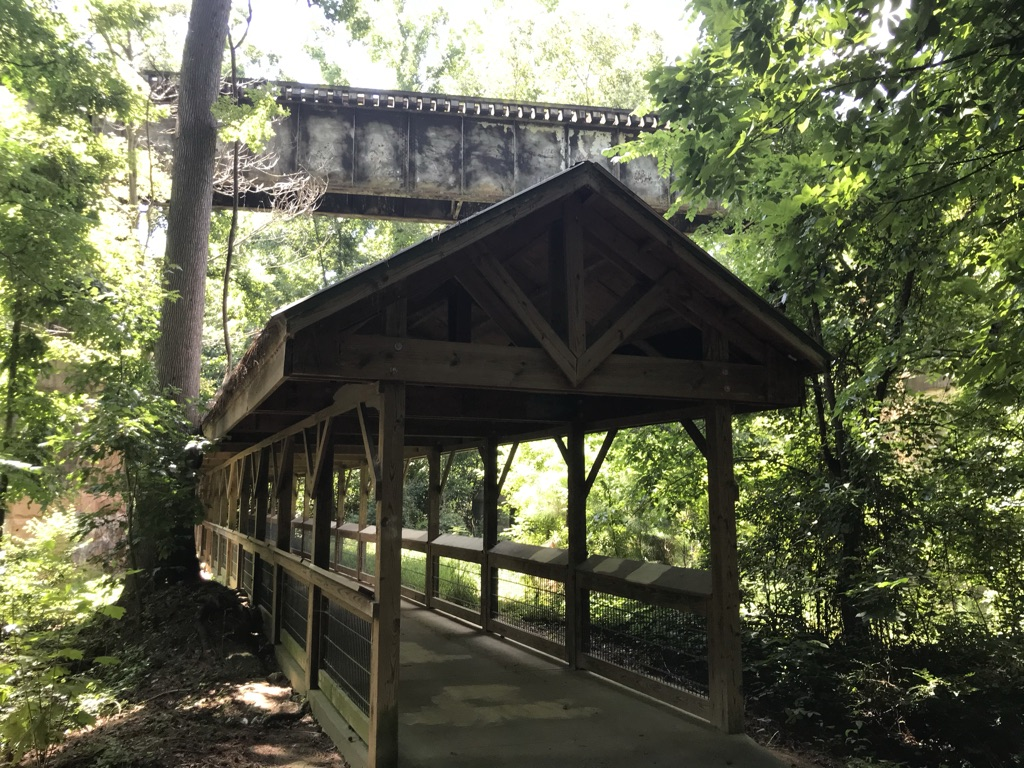
Walking trail in Cayce, crossing beneath railroad tracks

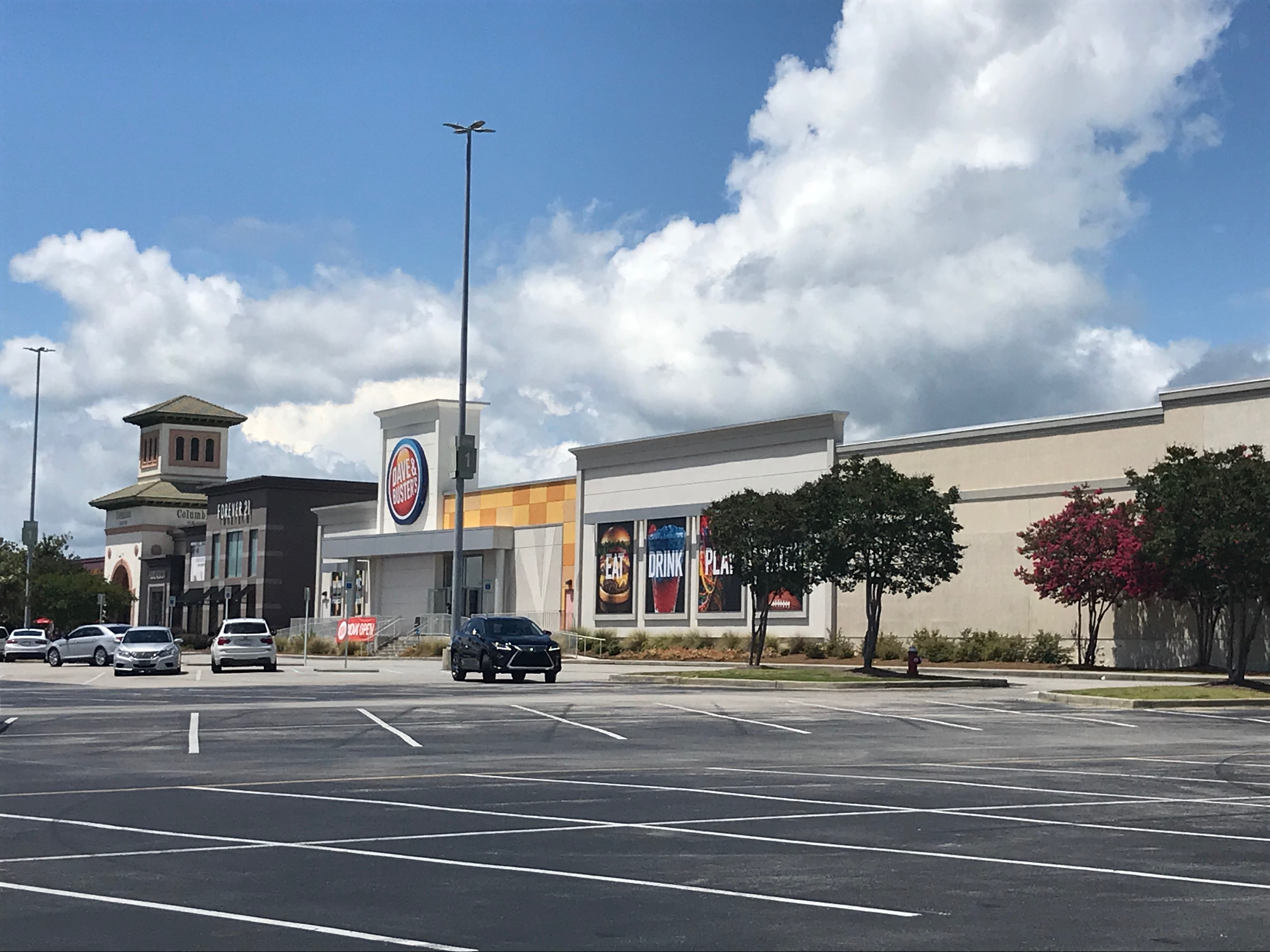
Columbiana Centre mall in Columbia

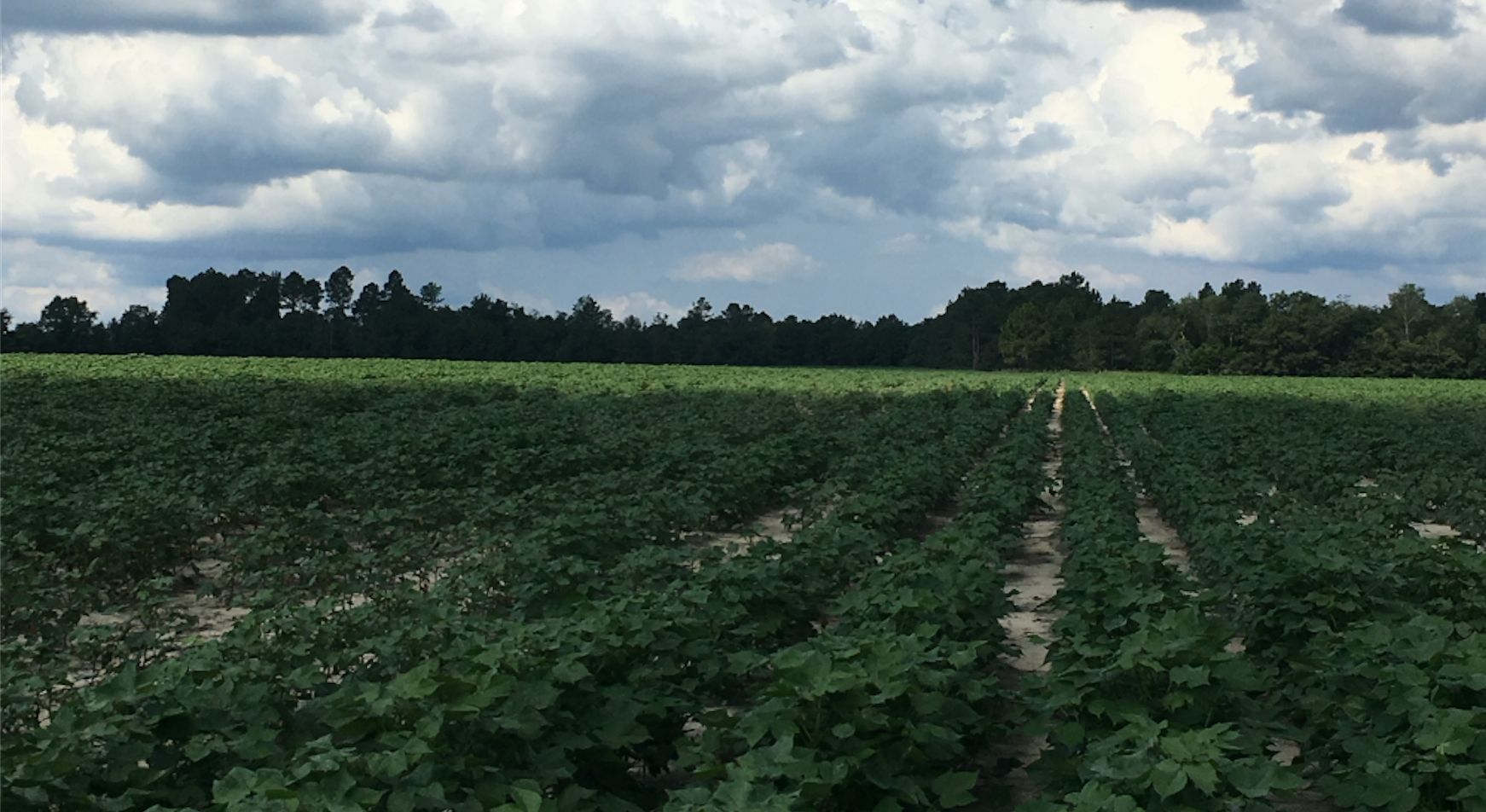
A farm in rural Lexington County near Swansea

=== Cities ===
- Cayce (partly in Richland County)
- Columbia (mostly in Richland County)
- West Columbia

=== Towns ===
- Batesburg-Leesville (partly in Saluda County)
- Chapin
- Gaston
- Gilbert
- Irmo (partly in Richland County)
- Lexington (county seat and largest community)
- Pelion
- Pine Ridge
- South Congaree
- Springdale
- Summit
- Swansea

=== Census-designated places ===
- Edmund
- Fairview Crossroads
- Oak Grove
- Red Bank
- Seven Oaks
- White Knoll

=== Ghost town ===
- Granby

=== Population ranking ===
The population ranking of the following table is based on the 2020 census of Lexington County.

† = county seat

Rank	Name	Type	Population (2020 census)
1	Columbia	City	136,632
2	† Lexington	Town	23,568
3	West Columbia	City	17,416
4	Seven Oaks	CDP	14,652
5	Cayce	City	13,781
6	Oak Grove	CDP	12,899
7	Irmo	Town	11,569
8	Red Bank	CDP	10,924
9	White Knoll	CDP	7,858
10	Batesburg-Leesville	Town	5,270
11	Springdale	Town	2,744
12	South Congaree	Town	2,377
13	Pine Ridge	Town	2,167
14	Chapin	Town	1,809
15	Gaston	Town	1,608
16	Edmund	CDP	969
17	Swansea	Town	722
18	Pelion	Town	631
19	Gilbert	Town	571
20	Fairview Crossroads	CDP	540
21	Summit	Town	423

== Notable person ==
- Floyd Spence, former representative for South Carolina's 2nd congressional district

== See also ==
- List of counties in South Carolina
- National Register of Historic Places listings in Lexington County, South Carolina
- Birch County, South Carolina, proposed county that would include existing portions of Lexington County
