= Fairview Crossroads, South Carolina =

- Census-designated place
- Location within South Carolina Location within the United States
- Coordinates: 33°45′31″N 81°21′59″W
- Country: United States
- State: South Carolina
- County: Lexington

Area
  - Total: 5.72 sq mi (14.81 km^{2})
  - Land: 5.71 sq mi (14.79 km^{2})
  - Water: 0.0039 sq mi (0.01 km^{2})
- Elevation: 469 ft (143 m)

Population (2020)
  - Total: 540
  - Density: 94.6/sq mi (36.51/km^{2})
- Time zone: UTC-5 (Eastern (EST))
  - Summer (DST): UTC-4 (EDT)
- ZIP Code: 29070 (Leesville)
- Area codes: 803/839
- FIPS code: 45-24865
- GNIS feature ID: 2807070

Fairview Crossroads is an unincorporated community and census-designated place (CDP) in Lexington County, South Carolina, United States. It was first listed as a CDP prior to the 2020 census with a population of 540.

The CDP is in southern Lexington County, centered on the junction of U.S. Route 178 and South Carolina Highway 113. US 178 leads northwest 15 miles (24 km) to Batesburg-Leesville and southeast 7 miles (11 km) to Pelion, while Highway 113 leads south 7 miles (11 km) to Wagener.

== Demographics ==
Historical population
Census	Pop.	Note	%±
2020	540		—
U.S. Decennial Census; 2020

Fairview Crossroads first appeared as a census designated place in the 2020 U.S. census.

=== 2020 census ===
Fairview Crossroads CDP, South Carolina – Racial and ethnic composition Note: the US Census treats Hispanic/Latino as an ethnic category. This table excludes Latinos from the racial categories and assigns them to a separate category. Hispanics/Latinos may be of any race.
Race / Ethnicity (NH = Non-Hispanic)	Pop 2020	% 2020
White alone (NH)	461	85.37%
Black or African American alone (NH)	18	3.33%
Native American or Alaska Native alone (NH)	2	0.37%
Asian alone (NH)	1	0.19%
Native Hawaiian or Pacific Islander alone (NH)	0	0.00%
Other race alone (NH)	2	0.37%
Mixed race or Multiracial (NH)	29	5.37%
Hispanic or Latino (any race)	27	5.00%
Total	540	100.00%
