= Downtown Columbia, South Carolina =

Central district of Columbia, South Carolina, United States

Downtown Columbia
- Neighborhood

- Location within South Carolina Location within the United States
- Coordinates: 34°0′2″N 81°2′5″W
- Country: United States
- State: South Carolina
- County: Richland
- City: Columbia
- Elevation: 302 ft (92 m)
- Time zone: UTC-5 (Eastern (EST))
  - Summer (DST): UTC-4 (EDT)
- ZIP code: 29201
- Area codes: 803, 839
- FIPS code: 45-16000
- GNIS feature ID: 1245051
- Website: columbiasc.gov

Downtown Columbia is the downtown area of Columbia, South Carolina, United States. It contains the city's central business district and the State House. It also encompasses the University of South Carolina. Columbia is the capital of South Carolina. Downtown Columbia's landmarks include the State House, Congaree River, and Capitol Center.

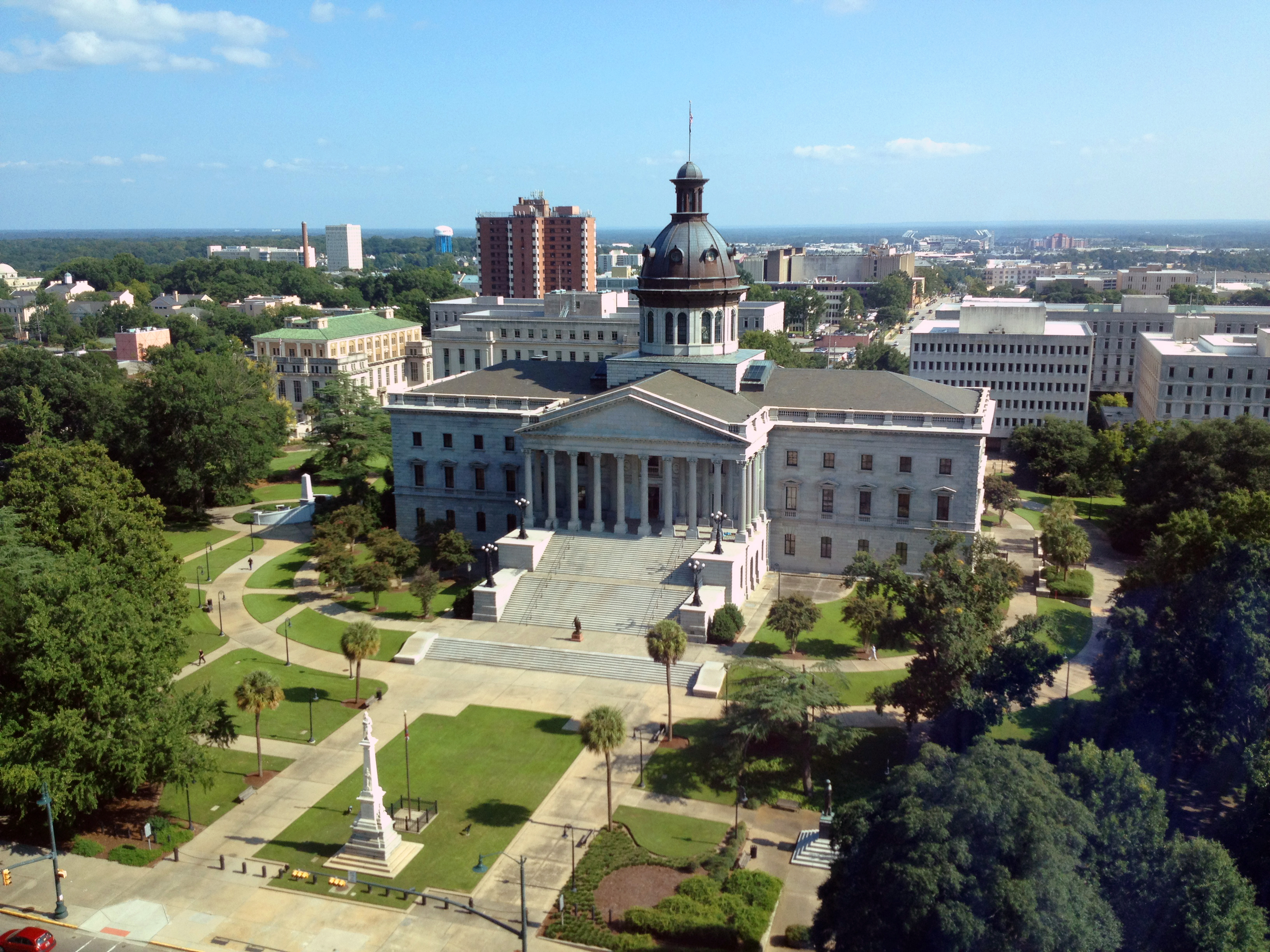
Downtown Columbia is centered around the State House

== See also ==
- Columbia, South Carolina
