= Red Bank, South Carolina =

Census-designated place in South Carolina, U.S.

- Census-designated place
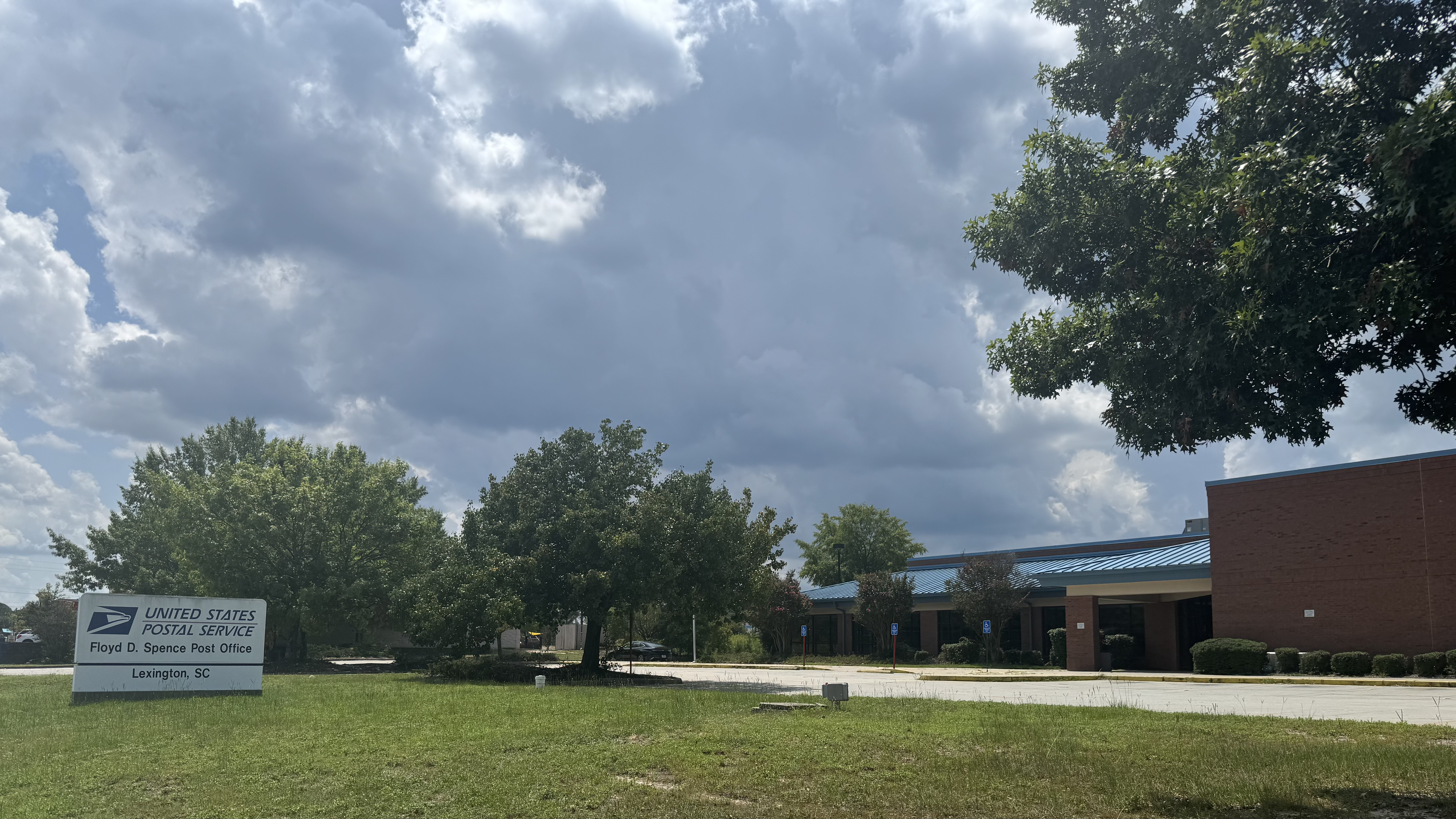
- Floyd D. Spence Post Office located in Red Bank with a Lexington address

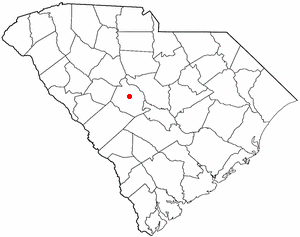
- Location of Red Bank, South Carolina
- Coordinates: 33°55′35″N 81°14′39″W
- Country: United States
- State: South Carolina
- County: Lexington

Area
  - Total: 12.76 sq mi (33.05 km^{2})
  - Land: 12.54 sq mi (32.47 km^{2})
  - Water: 0.22 sq mi (0.58 km^{2})
- Elevation: 312 ft (95 m)

Population (2020)
  - Total: 10,924
  - Density: 871.4/sq mi (336.44/km^{2})
- Time zone: UTC-5 (Eastern (EST))
  - Summer (DST): UTC-4 (EDT)
- ZIP code: 29073 (Lexington)
- Area codes: 803, 839
- FIPS code: 45-59110
- GNIS feature ID: 2403462

Red Bank is an unincorporated community and census-designated place (CDP) in Lexington County, South Carolina, United States. The population was 9,617 at the 2010 census, up from 8,811 at the 2000 census. It is part of the Columbia, South Carolina Metropolitan Statistical Area.

== Geography ==
Red Bank is located just east of the center of Lexington County and it is bordered to the north by Lexington, the county seat, and to the south by the White Knoll CDP. South Carolina Highway 6 (S. Lake Drive) is the main road through town, leading north 3.5 miles (5.6 km) to the center of Lexington and south 5.5 miles (8.9 km) to Edmund towards Pelion and Swansea. Interstate 20 forms a border between the town of Lexington and Red Bank as well as their respective postal codes. Platt Springs Road (South Carolina Highway 602 east of SC-6) forms the border between Red Bank and White Knoll. Highway 602 leads northeast 11 miles (18 km) to West Columbia.

According to the United States Census Bureau, the Red Bank CDP has a total area of 12.0 square miles (31.2 km^{2}), of which 11.8 square miles (30.6 km^{2}) are land and 0.2 square miles (0.6 km^{2}), or 1.85%, are water. Red Bank Creek, an east-flowing tributary of Congaree Creek and part of the Congaree River watershed, passes just south of the original town center. Crystal Lake and Saxe-Gotha Millpond are two small reservoirs impounding the creek.

== Demographics ==
Historical population
| Census | Pop. | Note | %± |
|---|---|---|---|
| 2020 | 10,924 | | — |
U.S. Decennial Census

=== 2020 census ===
As of the 2020 census, Red Bank had a population of 10,924. The median age was 37.4 years. 23.7% of residents were under the age of 18 and 13.9% of residents were 65 years of age or older. For every 100 females, there were 96.1 males, and for every 100 females age 18 and over there were 92.4 males age 18 and over.

100.0% of residents lived in urban areas, while 0.0% lived in rural areas.

There were 4,289 households, including 3,035 families. Of all households, 32.0% had children under the age of 18 living in them. Of all households, 47.0% were married-couple households, 18.0% were households with a male householder and no spouse or partner present, and 27.4% were households with a female householder and no spouse or partner present. About 25.9% of all households were made up of individuals and 9.3% had someone living alone who was 65 years of age or older.

There were 4,617 housing units, of which 7.1% were vacant. The homeowner vacancy rate was 2.7% and the rental vacancy rate was 4.2%.

Red Bank racial composition
| Race | Num. | Perc. |
|---|---|---|
| White (non-Hispanic) | 7,956 | 72.83% |
| Black or African American (non-Hispanic) | 1,512 | 13.84% |
| Native American | 44 | 0.4% |
| Asian | 72 | 0.66% |
| Pacific Islander | 4 | 0.04% |
| Other/Mixed | 646 | 5.91% |
| Hispanic or Latino | 690 | 6.32% |

=== 2000 census ===
As of the census of 2000, there were 8,811 people, 3,281 households, and 2,480 families residing in the CDP. The population density was 740.6 inhabitants per square mile (285.9/km^{2}). There were 3,498 housing units at an average density of 294.0 per square mile (113.5/km^{2}). The racial makeup of the CDP was 88.74% White, 8.84% African American, 0.35% Native American, 0.49% Asian, 0.03% Pacific Islander, 0.93% from other races, and 0.61% from two or more races. Hispanic or Latino of any race were 1.90% of the population.

There were 3,281 households, out of which 43.4% had children under the age of 18 living with them, 58.6% were married couples living together, 12.8% had a female householder with no husband present, and 24.4% were non-families. 19.4% of all households were made up of individuals, and 3.6% had someone living alone who was 65 years of age or older. The average household size was 2.68 and the average family size was 3.09.

In the CDP, the population was spread out, with 29.8% under the age of 18, 7.6% from 18 to 24, 37.2% from 25 to 44, 20.3% from 45 to 64, and 5.1% who were 65 years of age or older. The median age was 32 years. For every 100 females, there were 93.1 males. For every 100 females age 18 and over, there were 92.6 males.

The median income for a household in the CDP was $42,072, and the median income for a family was $50,838. Males had a median income of $36,347 versus $26,016 for females. The per capita income for the CDP was $18,664. About 5.8% of families and 7.9% of the population were below the poverty line, including 11.1% of those under age 18 and 7.2% of those age 65 or over.

== Recent growth ==
The community of Red Bank, along with neighboring White Knoll, have seen substantial growth since the opening of White Knoll High School in 2000 to alleviate the overcrowding of Lexington High School. The formerly rural community has become largely suburban, seeing an influx of housing developments and national retailers entering the area.
