= Lexington County School District =

There are multiple school districts in Lexington County, South Carolina.

Lexington County School District may refer to:

- Lexington County School District One, serving Lexington, Gilbert, and Pelion
- Lexington County School District Two, serving Cayce and West Columbia
- Lexington County School District Three, serving Batesburg-Leesville
- Lexington School District 4, serving Gaston and Swansea
- Lexington & Richland County School District Five, serving Chapin and Irmo
