= Edmund, South Carolina =

- Census-designated place
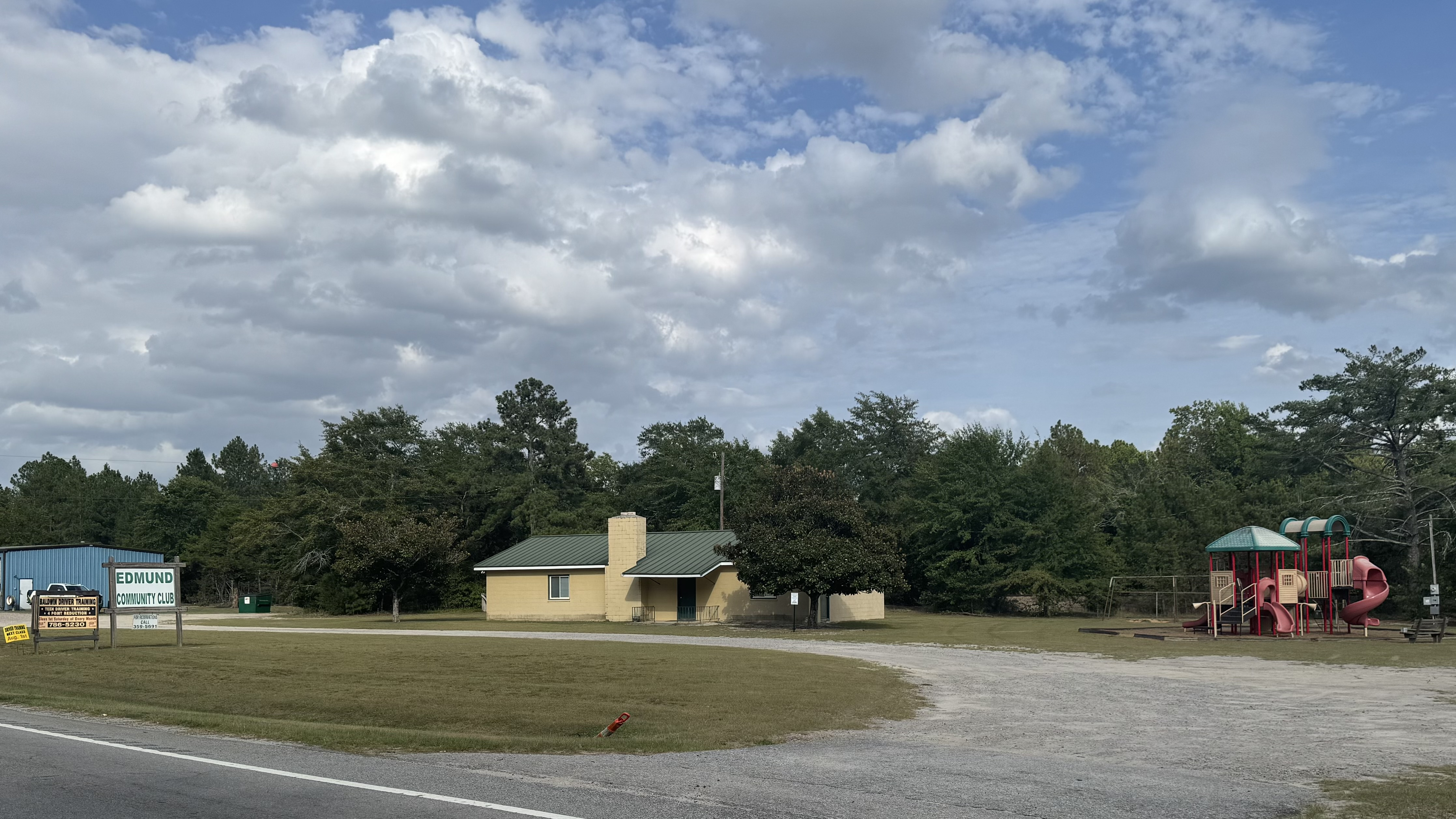
- Edmund Community Club

- Location within South Carolina Location within the United States
- Coordinates: 33°51′42″N 81°12′7″W
- Country: United States
- State: South Carolina
- County: Lexington

Area
  - Total: 6.84 sq mi (17.72 km^{2})
  - Land: 6.83 sq mi (17.70 km^{2})
  - Water: 0.0077 sq mi (0.02 km^{2})
- Elevation: 456 ft (139 m)

Population (2020)
  - Total: 969
  - Density: 141.8/sq mi (54.75/km^{2})
- Time zone: UTC-5 (Eastern (EST))
  - Summer (DST): UTC-4 (EDT)
- ZIP Code: 29073 (Lexington)
- Area codes: 803/839
- FIPS code: 45-23110
- GNIS feature ID: 2807069

Edmund is an unincorporated community and census-designated place (CDP) in Lexington County, South Carolina, United States. It was first listed as a CDP in the 2020 census with a population of 969.

The CDP is in central Lexington County, centered on the junction of South Carolina Highways 6 and 302. Highway 6 leads north 9 miles (14 km) to Lexington, the county seat, and southeast 12 miles (19 km) to Swansea, while Highway 302 leads northeast 10 miles (16 km) to West Columbia and southwest 7 miles (11 km) to Pelion. Edmund is bordered to the northwest by the CDPs of White Knoll and Red Bank and to the northeast by the towns of South Congaree and Pine Ridge.

== Demographics ==
Historical population
Census	Pop.	Note	%±
2020	969		—
U.S. Decennial Census; 2020

Edmund first appeared as a census designated place in the 2020 U.S. census.

=== 2020 census ===
Edmund CDP, South Carolina – Racial and ethnic composition Note: the US Census treats Hispanic/Latino as an ethnic category. This table excludes Latinos from the racial categories and assigns them to a separate category. Hispanics/Latinos may be of any race.
Race / Ethnicity (NH = Non-Hispanic)	Pop 2020	% 2020
White alone (NH)	692	71.41%
Black or African American alone (NH)	129	13.31%
Native American or Alaska Native alone (NH)	5	0.52%
Asian alone (NH)	3	0.31%
Native Hawaiian or Pacific Islander alone (NH)	0	0.00%
Other race alone (NH)	6	0.62%
Mixed race or Multiracial (NH)	63	6.50%
Hispanic or Latino (any race)	71	7.33%
Total	969	100.00%
