= White Knoll, South Carolina =

- Census-designated place
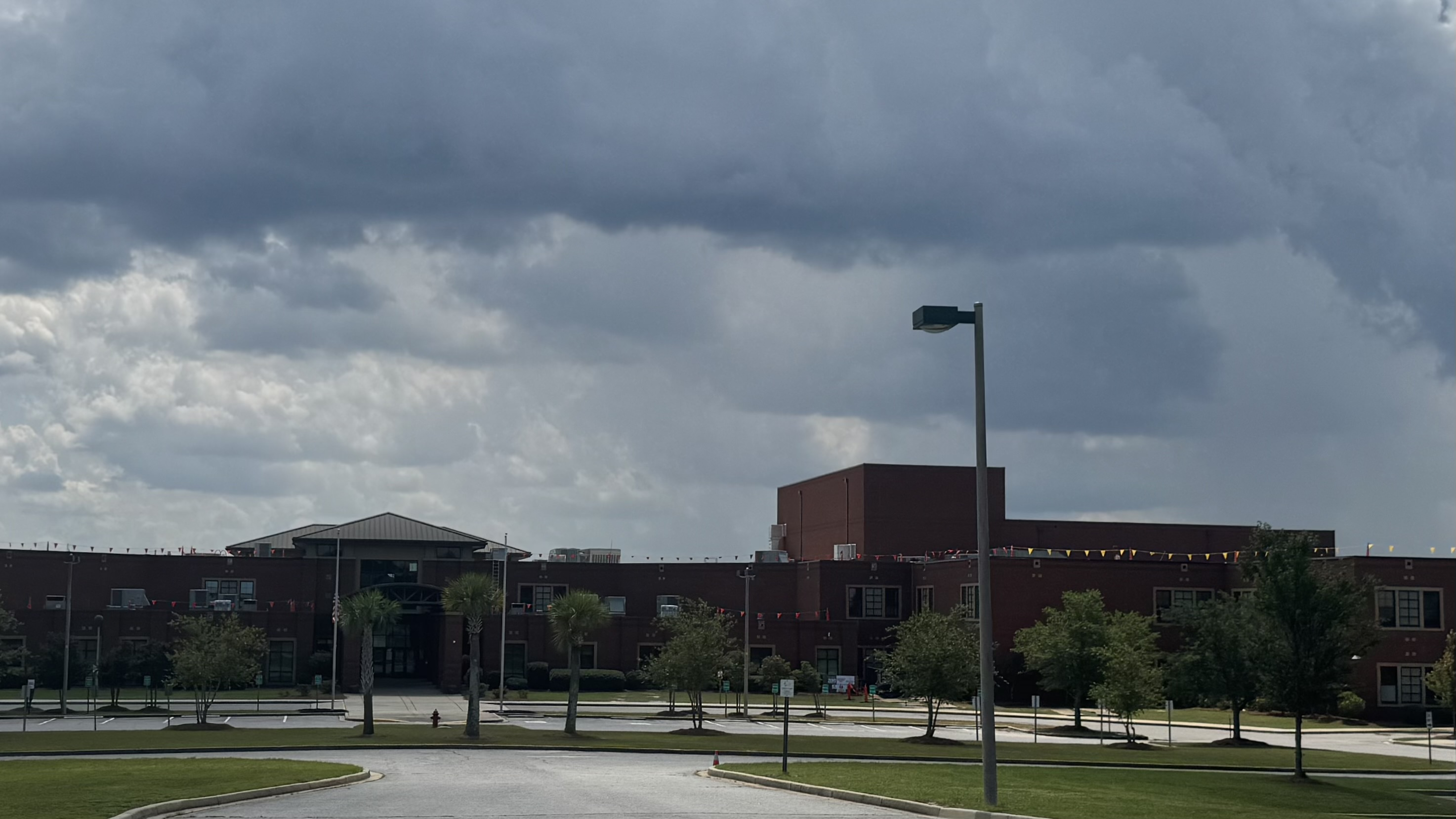
- White Knoll High School, located in the northern part of White Knoll

- Location within South Carolina Location within the United States
- Coordinates: 33°53′57″N 81°13′36″W
- Country: United States
- State: South Carolina
- County: Lexington

Area
  - Total: 6.18 sq mi (16.00 km^{2})
  - Land: 6.12 sq mi (15.85 km^{2})
  - Water: 0.058 sq mi (0.15 km^{2})
- Elevation: 312 ft (95 m)

Population (2020)
  - Total: 7,858
  - Density: 1,284.4/sq mi (495.92/km^{2})
- Time zone: UTC-5 (Eastern (EST))
  - Summer (DST): UTC-4 (EDT)
- ZIP Code: 29073 (Lexington)
- Area codes: 803/839
- FIPS code: 45-77042
- GNIS feature ID: 2807072

White Knoll is an unincorporated area and census-designated place (CDP) in Lexington County, South Carolina, United States. It was first listed as a CDP in the 2020 census with a population of 7,858. It is part of the Columbia, South Carolina Metropolitan Statistical Area.

The CDP is in central Lexington County, bordered to the southeast by Edmund and to the north by Red Bank. It is 5 miles (8 km) south of the town of Lexington, the county seat. South Carolina Highway 6 passes through the community, leading north to Lexington and southeast 15 miles (24 km) towards Pelion and Swansea. Platt Springs Road (South Carolina Highway 602 east of SC-6) forms the border between Red Bank and White Knoll.

White Knoll High School is located in the northern part of White Knoll.

== Demographics ==
Historical population
Census	Pop.	Note	%±
2020	7,858		—
U.S. Decennial Census; 2020

White Knoll first appeared as a census designated place in the 2020 U.S. census.

=== 2020 census ===
White Knoll CDP, South Carolina – Racial and ethnic composition Note: the US Census treats Hispanic/Latino as an ethnic category. This table excludes Latinos from the racial categories and assigns them to a separate category. Hispanics/Latinos may be of any race.
Race / Ethnicity (NH = Non-Hispanic)	Pop 2020	% 2020
White alone (NH)	5,084	64.70%
Black or African American alone (NH)	1,710	21.76%
Native American or Alaska Native alone (NH)	24	0.31%
Asian alone (NH)	108	1.37%
Native Hawaiian or Pacific Islander alone (NH)	2	0.03%
Other race alone (NH)	41	0.52%
Mixed race or Multiracial (NH)	381	4.85%
Hispanic or Latino (any race)	508	6.46%
Total	7,858	100.00%
