= Gilbert High School =

Gilbert High School may refer to any of the following:

- Gilbert High School (Arizona) in Gilbert, Arizona, United States
- Gilbert Junior-Senior High School in Gilbert, Iowa, United States
- Gilbert High School (South Carolina) in Gilbert, South Carolina, United States
- Eveleth-Gilbert Senior School in Eveleth, Minnesota, United States
- Matthew Gilbert High School, now Matthew Gilbert Middle School in Jacksonville, Florida, United States
