= Swansea High School =

Public high school in Swansea, South Carolina, United States

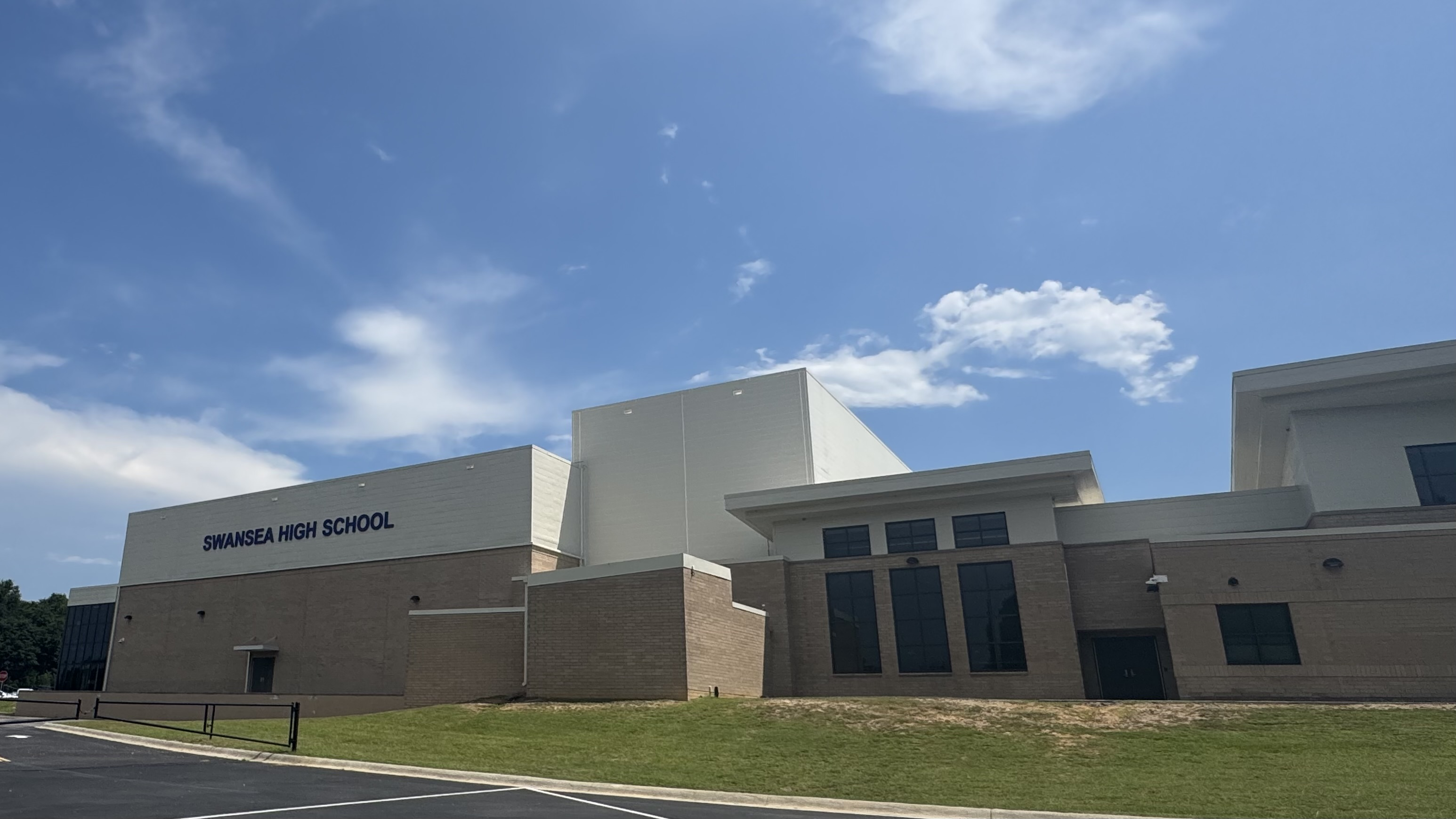
- Swansea High School in 2026

Location
- 500 East First Street; Swansea, South Carolina, Lexington County; United States; 33°44′11″N 81°05′39″W

Information
- Type: Public, secondary
- Motto: Ensuring Student Performance at the Highest Level
- School district: Lexington County Schools Lexington School District 4
- Principal: Marcia Seawright
- Teaching staff: 48.00 (FTE)
- Grades: 9–12
- Enrollment: 684 (2023–2024)
- Student to teacher ratio: 14.46
- Colors: Purple and gold
- Mascot: Tigers
- Nickname: Swansea Tigers
- Rival: Pelion High School
- Newspaper: Tiger Times
- Yearbook: Swansean
- Website: www.lex4.org/shs

Swansea High School in Swansea, South Carolina is a public high school offering education for grades 10–12, serving the surrounding communities of Swansea, Gaston, and parts of Pelion. It derives its name from its location next to Swansea, South Carolina.

== Feeder schools ==
The following elementary and middle schools feed into Swansea High School:

- Early Childhood Center (opened in 2011) (3K–5K)
- Sandhills Primary (1st–2nd grade)
- Sandhills Elementary (3rd–4th grade)
- Frances Mack Intermediate (5th-6th grade)
- Sandhills Middle (7th–8th Grade)
- Swansea High Freshmen Academy (9th graders only)

== Athletics ==
Swansea's teams are known as the Tigers. Their main athletic rival is the Pelion High School Panthers.

=== State championships ===
- Basketball - Girls: 1995
- Football: 1960, 1974, 1975, 1992, 1993, 1994
- Wrestling: 1979, 1980, 1981, 1986, 1987, 1990, 1991, 1992, 1995, 2002

== Notable alumni ==
- Victor Riley, former NFL offensive lineman
