= Lexington High School (South Carolina) =

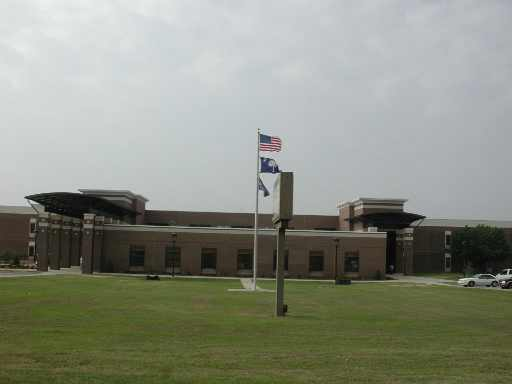

Location
- 2463 Augusta Highway; Lexington, South Carolina 29072; United States
- 33°58′40″N 81°18′30″W

Information
- Type: Public
- Motto: Enter to Learn, Leave to Serve
- Established: 1912 (114 years ago)
- Founder: Hunter William Hartung
- School district: Lexington School District 1
- Superintendent: Dr. Keith Price
- CEEB code: 411290
- Principal: Jennifer McNair
- Teaching staff: 163.50 (FTE)
- Grades: 9–12
- Enrollment: 2,536 (2024–2025)
- Student to teacher ratio: 15.51
- Campus type: Suburban
- Colors: Royal blue and gold
- Fight song: Notre Dame Victory March
- Athletics conference: Region V AAAAA
- Nickname: Wildcats
- Rival: River Bluff High School
- Accreditation: Southern Association of Colleges and Schools
- Yearbook: Cat's Paw
- Website: lhs.lexington1.net

Lexington High School is a public high school in Lexington, South Carolina that provides education for ninth through twelfth grades, serving the communities of Lexington, Lake Murray, and West Lexington. The school's athletic mascot is the Wildcat. Lexington was the first high school and only school in South Carolina to be twice selected as the Carolina First Palmetto's Finest and the first to be named a Unified School. It is an International Baccalaureate World School.

== Band ==
The Lexington Wind Ensemble has performed at the Midwest Band and Orchestra Clinic, the Bands of America National Concert Band Festival, and awarded the Honor Band at the Grand National Adjudicators Invitational. The Wind Ensemble has performed at the Georgia, Kentucky, and South Carolina Music Educators Association Conferences as well as the University of South Carolina Band Clinic in Columbia.

The "Cat Band" has performed at parades such as the Macy's Thanksgiving Day Parade, the Tournament of Roses Parade, and the London New Years Parade.

The marching band has been a Bands of America Regional and Atlanta Super Regional finalist five times and won the Bands of America Regional Class AAA Championship in Johnson City, TN in 1999. The band has won the South Carolina State 5A Marching Band Championship five times.

== Feeder patterns ==
The following schools feed into Lexington High School:

- Beechwood Middle School
- Pleasant Hill Middle School

via Beechwood Middle School:

- New Providence Elementary School
- Lake Murray Elementary School
- Rocky Creek Elementary School

via Pleasant Hill Middle School:

- Pleasant Hill Elementary School
- Deerfield Elementary School

== Splits ==
Lexington High School split in 2000 with the opening of White Knoll High School. The new school alleviated overcrowding and re-introduced 9th grade to Lexington's campus for the first time since 1993 when the freshman class was moved to two middle schools to accommodate for rapid growth in the Lexington area. White Knoll High School is located south of Lexington, largely serving the White Knoll and Red Bank communities. A rivalry has formed with teams competing annually in at least 14 sports, replacing the decades-long Lake Murray "dam rivalry" between Lexington and Irmo High School.

In the fall of 2013, Lexington High School split again. The new school, River Bluff High School, is located in northeast Lexington serving the town of Lexington, Oak Grove, and parts of Lake Murray and the city of West Columbia.

== Notable alumni ==
- John Boozer, MLB pitcher
- Nick Ciuffo, MLB catcher
- DT Cromer, MLB first baseman
- Brett Jodie, MLB pitcher
- Lacie Lybrand, Miss South Carolina USA 2006
- Shaq Roland, football wide receiver, South Carolina's Mr. Football in 2011
- Floyd Spence, former U.S. congressman
- Demetris Summers, Canadian Football League running back
- Caitlin Upton, Miss South Carolina Teen USA 2007
- Ava Max, American singer and songwriter

== See also ==
- List of high schools in South Carolina
