= Music Hall Evangelical Lutheran Church =

Historic church in South Carolina, United States

- U.S. National Register of Historic Places
- Nearest city: Gilbert, South Carolina
- Area: 0.2 acres (0.081 ha)
- Built: 1892
- Architect: Price, William
- MPS: Lexington County MRA
- NRHP reference No.: 83003913
- Added to NRHP: November 22, 1989

Music Hall Evangelical Lutheran Church is a historic church in Gilbert, South Carolina. It was founded in the belief that music should play a large role in the service. The congregation disbanded in 1906, and the building was used for storage.

It was built in 1892 and added to the National Register in 1983.
