= Shaq Roland =

American football player (born 1993)

Profile
- Position: Wide receiver

Personal information
- Born: December 27, 1993 (age 32); Batesburg-Leesville, South Carolina, U.S.
- Listed height: 6 ft 2 in (1.88 m)
- Listed weight: 190 lb (86 kg)

Career information
- High school: Lexington (SC)
- College: South Carolina
- NFL draft: 2018: undrafted

Career history
- Chicago Bears (2018)*; Baltimore Brigade (2019)*
- * Offseason or practice squad member only

Shaq Roland (born December 27, 1993) is an American former professional football wide receiver. He played college football at South Carolina.

== Early life ==
A native of Lexington, South Carolina, Roland graduated from Lexington High School in 2012. He was named to the annual PARADE magazine 53-man All-America team in his senior year, during which he recorded 24 touchdowns. As a college prospect, Roland was a four-star player, the highest score in the state and the tenth-best receiver in the nation. He was also ranked the 66th-best player overall by Rivals.com, the 40th-best player in the country by Scout.com, and a four-star recruit by ESPN.

Roland also played basketball, recording seven rebounds during his junior year.

== College career ==
Roland became the fourth-straight South Carolina "Mr. Football" to sign with the South Carolina Gamecocks, following Stephon Gilmore, Marcus Lattimore and Jadeveon Clowney.

After leaving South Carolina in 2014, Roland enrolled at Prairie View A&M University but instead decided to return to Lexington. In 2016, Roland returned to school, attending Winston-Salem State University. Roland stated that he was, "very interested" in a return to the South Carolina football program to play out his final year of eligibility.

== Professional career ==
Roland signed with the Chicago Bears as an undrafted free agent on May 10, 2018. He was waived by the Bears on June 7, 2018. On March 20, 2019, Roland was assigned to the Baltimore Brigade. On April 16, 2019, he was placed on recallable reassignment and became a free agent.
