= Nick Ciuffo =

American baseball player (born 1995)

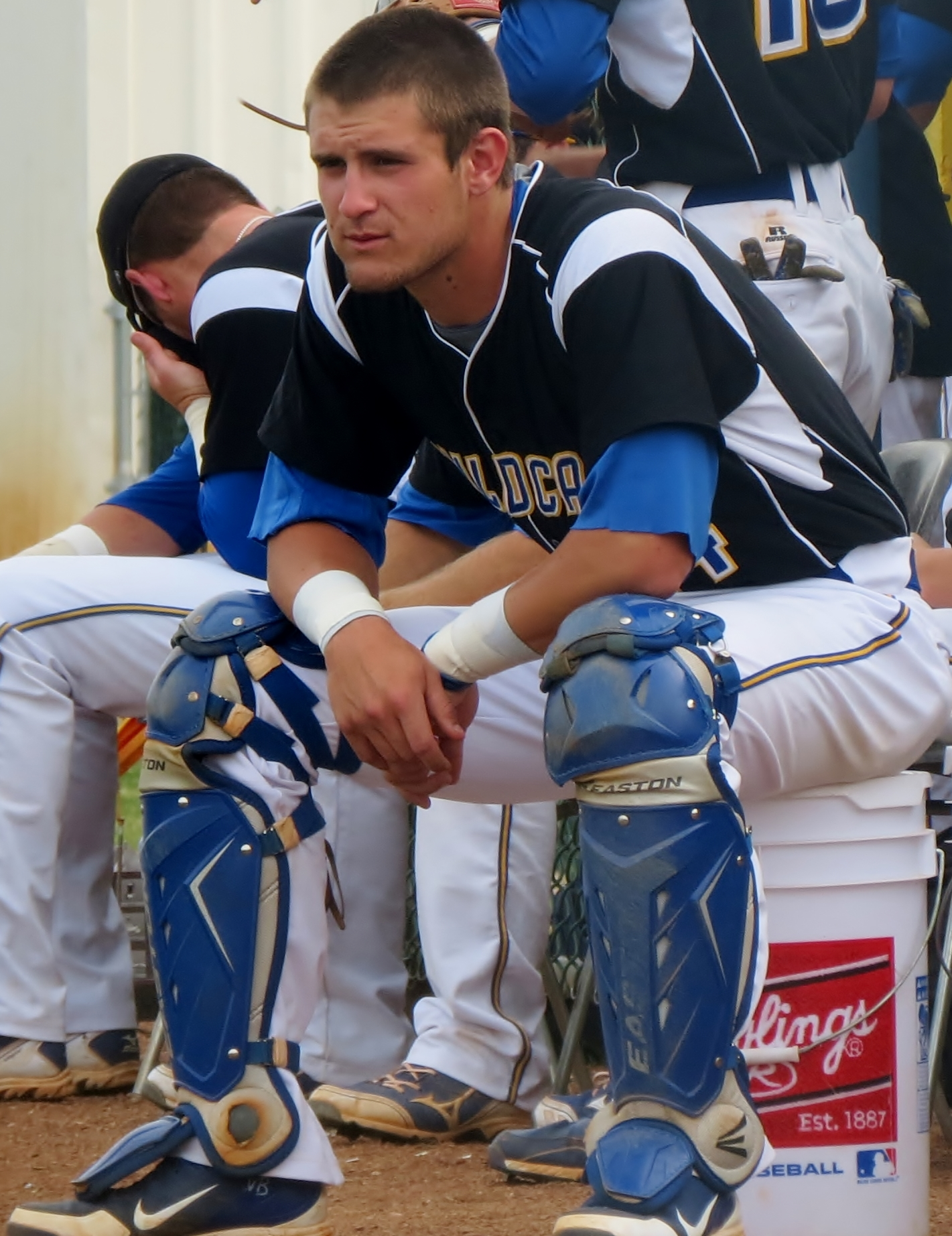
- Catcher
- Born: March 7, 1995 (age 30); Mount Pleasant, South Carolina, U.S.
- Batted: Left Threw: Right

MLB debut
- September 3, 2018, for the Tampa Bay Rays

Last MLB appearance
- October 2, 2021, for the Baltimore Orioles

MLB statistics
- Batting average: .188
- Home runs: 1
- Runs batted in: 5
- Stats at Baseball Reference

Teams
- Tampa Bay Rays (2018–2019); Baltimore Orioles (2021)
Medals
Men's baseball
Representing United States
World Youth Baseball Championship
Gold medal – first place	2011 Lagos de Moreno	National team

Nicholas Anthony Ciuffo (born March 7, 1995) is an American former professional baseball catcher. He played in Major League Baseball (MLB) for the Tampa Bay Rays and Baltimore Orioles. Ciuffo attended Lexington High School in Lexington, South Carolina, and was selected by the Rays in the first round of the 2013 MLB draft.

== Amateur career ==
Ciuffo attended Wando High School in Mount Pleasant, South Carolina, for his freshman and sophomore years, and then transferred to Lexington High School in Lexington, South Carolina. As a freshman, Ciuffo was named to the All-Lowcountry team. Lexington won the state's Class 4A championship in 2013, and Ciuffo was named the South Carolina Gatorade Player of the Year. In 123 cumulative high school games, Ciuffo had a .401 batting average, 11 home runs, and 93 runs batted in (RBIs). He competed for the United States national baseball team, leading the United States to the gold medal in the 2011 World Youth Baseball Championship.

Ciuffo had been committed to attend the University of South Carolina to play college baseball for the South Carolina Gamecocks. He received the scholarship offer before playing a single high school game. However, he was also considered a likely first round pick in the 2013 Major League Baseball draft, and said that the chances of his signing a contract and forgoing his college commitment are "50-50".

== Professional career ==
=== Tampa Bay Rays ===
The Tampa Bay Rays selected Ciuffo in the first round, with the 21st overall selection, of the 2013 Major League Baseball draft. Ciuffo signed with the Rays, receiving a $1,974,700 signing bonus, and reported to the Gulf Coast Rays to begin his professional career. He appeared in 43 games for the GCL Rays where he slashed .258/.296/.308.

Ciuffo began the 2014 season in extended spring training, was assigned to the Princeton Rays in June, where he spent the entire season, batting .224 with four home runs and 20 RBI in 52 games. He played with the Bowling Green Hot Rods in 2015 and batted .258 with one home run and 32 RBI in 94 games. In 2016, with the Charlotte Stone Crabs, Ciuffo compiled a .262 batting average with 15 RBI and 8 doubles in 59 games. After the 2016 season, Ciuffo was named Tampa Bay's Minor League Defensive Player of the Year. He spent 2017 with the Montgomery Biscuits and posted a .245 batting average with seven home runs and 42 RBI in 102 games. He was named Tampa Bay's Minor League Defensive Player of the Year for the second straight season. The Rays invited Ciuffo to spring training in 2018, but he was suspended for 50 games for his second positive test for a drug of abuse. In the 2018 season, Ciuffo played for the Durham Bulls of the Triple–A International League. Ciuffo hit .262/.301/.380 with five home runs and 28 runs batted in over 60 games.

==== Major Leagues ====
On September 3, 2018, Ciuffo was promoted to the major leagues for the first time. Ciuffo slashed .189/.262/.297 with one home run in 37 at-bats.

On June 28, 2019, the Rays designated Ciuffo for assignment. On July 1, Ciuffo was placed on release waivers.

=== Cincinnati Reds ===
On July 9, 2019, Ciuffo signed a minor league contract with the Cincinnati Reds. He played in 12 games for the rookie–level Arizona League Reds and Triple–A Louisville Bats, and elected free agency following the season on November 4.

=== Texas Rangers ===
On December 5, 2019, Ciuffo signed a minor league contract with the Texas Rangers. The Rangers included Ciuffo in their 60-man player pool for the 2020 season. Ciuffo did not play in a game in 2020 due to the cancellation of the minor league season because of the COVID-19 pandemic. He became a free agent on November 2, 2020.

=== Baltimore Orioles ===
On December 21, 2020, Ciuffo signed a minor league contract with the Baltimore Orioles organization. The Orioles promoted him to the major leagues on September 24, 2021. Ciuffo went 1-for-5 with a double in two games for Baltimore, spending the majority of the year with the Triple-A Norfolk Tides, with whom he slashed .173/.241/.308. On November 5, 2021, Ciuffo was outrighted off of the 40-man roster. He became a free agent on November 7.

=== Chicago White Sox ===
On March 14, 2022, Ciuffo signed a minor league contract with the Chicago White Sox. Ciuffo played in 42 games for the Triple-A Charlotte Knights, hitting .277/.325/.411 with five home runs and 20 RBI. He elected free agency following the season on November 10.

=== New York Yankees ===
On March 7, 2023, Ciuffo signed a minor league contract with the New York Yankees organization. He was released by the Yankees without making an appearance for the organization on April 13.

On June 7, 2023, Ciuffo announced his retirement from professional baseball, citing a broken foot that he suffered in spring training, which prevented him from playing for the Yankees organization.

== Personal life ==
Ciuffo grew up in Mount Pleasant, but moved to Lexington between his sophomore and junior years with his mother. His father, Tony, worked at the College of Charleston as its assistant director of athletics for media relations and the school's radio PBP announcer, which enabled Nick to observe the Charleston baseball team, and future major leaguers Brett Gardner and Michael Kohn.
