= River Bluff High School =

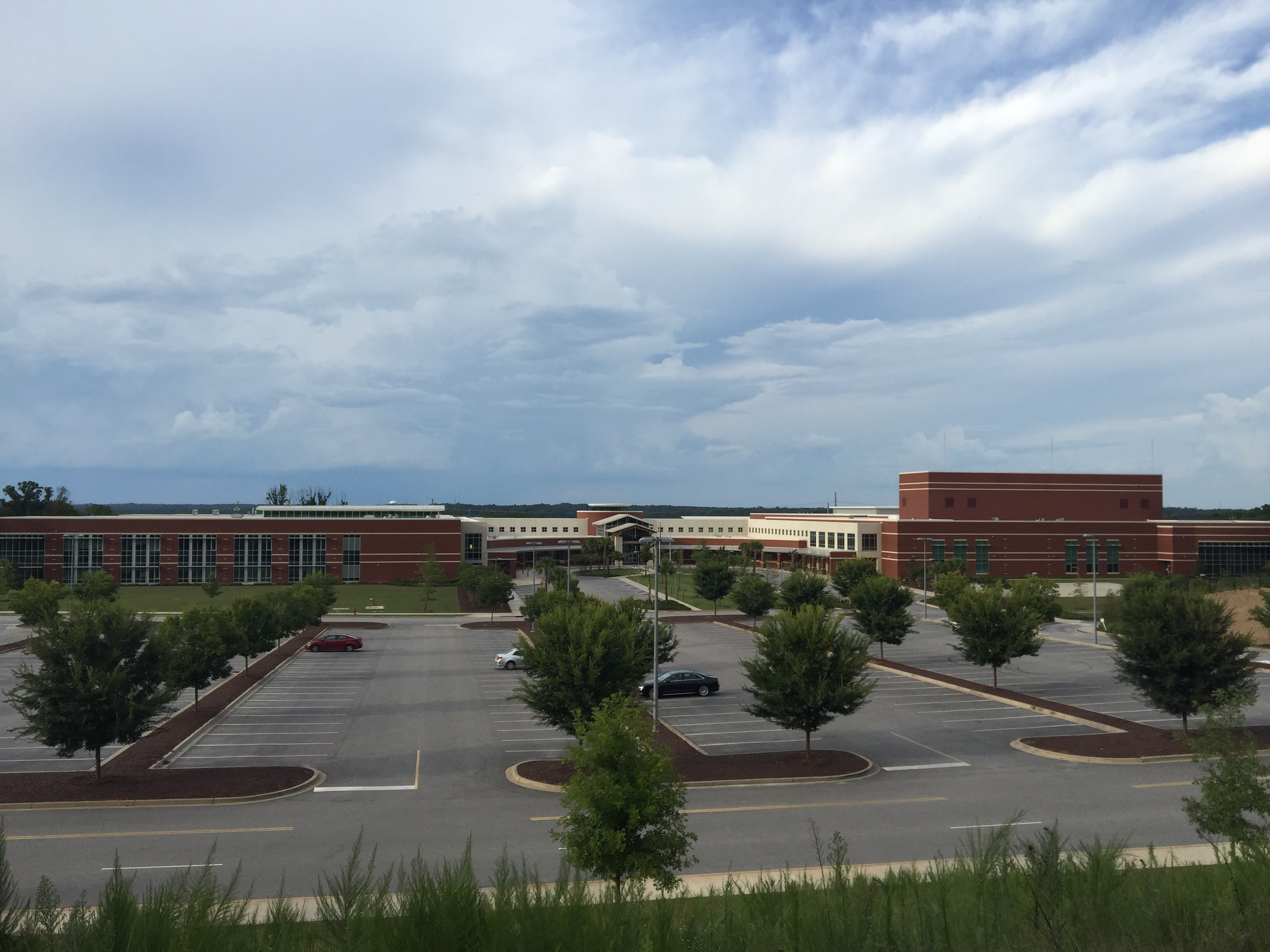
- River Bluff High School in 2016

Location
- 320 Corley Mill Road; Lexington, South Carolina 29072; United States; 34°01′38″N 81°09′03″W

Information
- Type: Public
- Motto: Work Hard. Get Smart. Do Good.
- Established: 2013 (13 years ago)
- School district: Lexington School District 1
- Oversight: South Carolina Department of Education
- Superintendent: Keith Price
- CEEB code: 411292
- Principal: Jacob Smith
- Teaching staff: 139.50 (FTE)
- Grades: 9–12
- Enrollment: 2,160 (2023–2024)
- Student to teacher ratio: 15.48
- Schedule: (8:40 am – 3:50 pm)
- Hours in school day: 7
- Campus type: Suburban
- Colors: Dark green and Vegas gold
- Fight song: War Eagle
- Athletics conference: Region V AAAAA
- Mascot: Gator
- Rival: Lexington High School
- Accreditation: Southern Association of Colleges and Schools
- Yearbook: The Tributary
- Website: rbhs.lexington1.net

River Bluff High School is one of three public high schools in Lexington, South Carolina, United States. It provides education for ninth through twelfth grades for the town of Lexington and parts of Lake Murray, Oak Grove and West Columbia. It is located on the eastern side of Lexington, overlooks the Saluda River, and is a few hundred feet from Interstate 20 and U.S. Highway 378.

== History ==
Construction began in January 2011 and was completed in August 2013. The construction process was overseen by Cumming Construction Management and contracted by China Construction America of South Carolina. River Bluff High School was designed in accordance with LEED for Schools Building Design and Construction principles and was certified Silver. It was constructed with many windows to reduce the cost of lighting. River Bluff is one of the largest schools in South Carolina, covering an area of 540,000 square feet (50,000 m^{2}). Construction cost $138.9 million, authorized by voters in 2008.

In 2021, while exploring school grounds, a group of students discovered the graves of numerous Black South Carolinians dating back to the 1800s. A landmark was later added to the area to commemorate the historically black Mount Zion AME Church/graveyard which had stood on the campus grounds from 1857 to 1929.

In 2023, the parents of a student sued a teacher, principal, and other education officials, claiming the student was assaulted for not stopping to recite the Pledge of Allegiance.

== Athletics ==
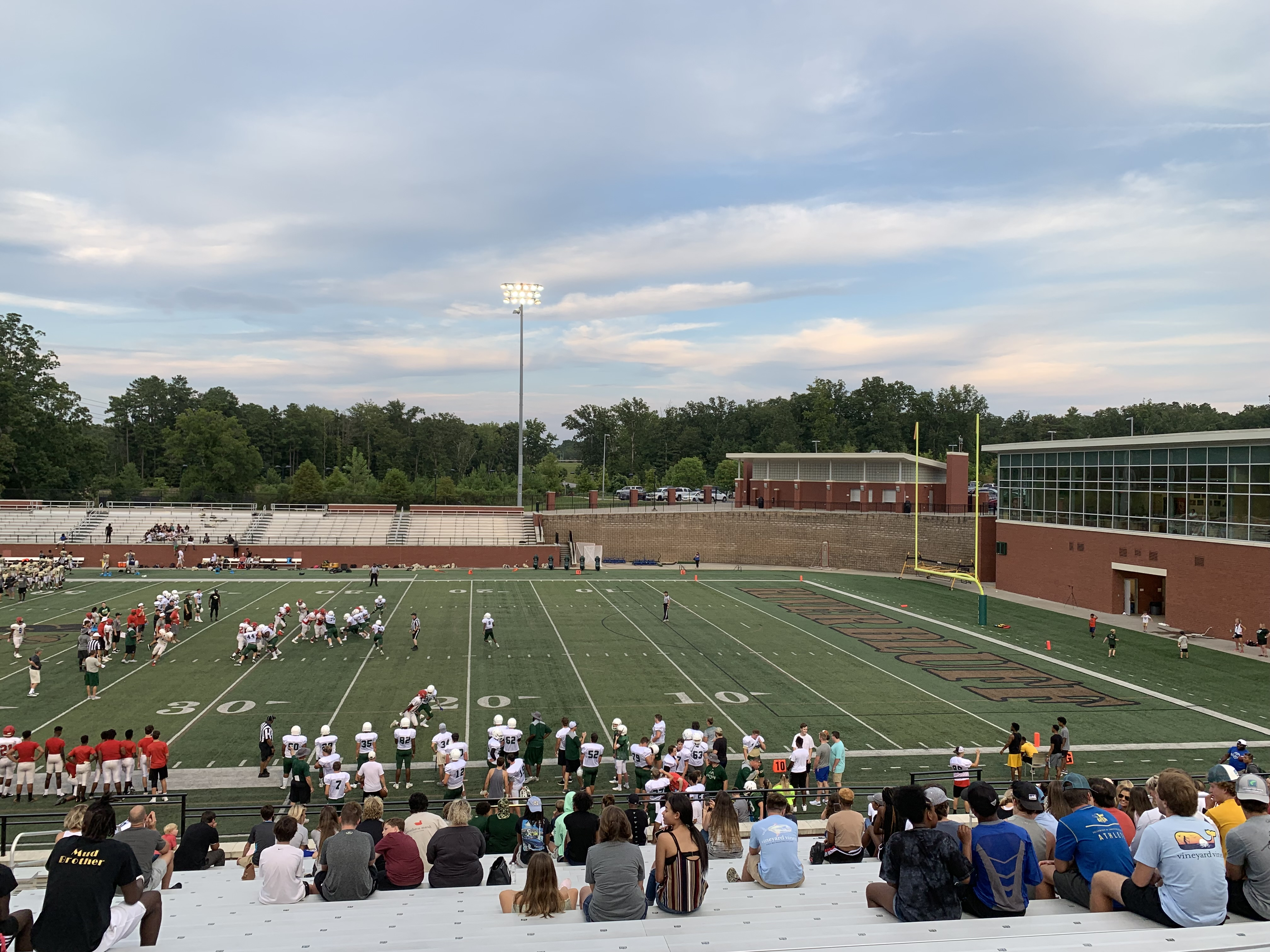
The River Bluff football stadium during a scrimmage in August 2019

=== Championships ===
All championships are 5A unless otherwise noted.

State Championships (15)

- Cheerleading: 2013 (AAA)
- Baseball: 2023
- Boys' basketball: 2021
- Boys' golf: 2025
- Boys' soccer: 2016 (AAAA)
- Girls' tennis: 2017, 2019
- Wrestling: 2017

== Bands ==
The River Bluff High School Marching Band, sometimes referred to as the Gator Band, is a 4 time Lower State champion in both Class AAA (2013) and AAAA (2014, 2015)

The school's Indoor Percussion Ensemble won the SCBDA Indoor Percussion Championships for class AA in 2015. In the 2016 season, it advanced to competition in Class A and was placed second at SCBDA and third at its first appearance at the CWEA Circuit Championships.

River Bluff High School serves as a venue for marching band competitions, hosting its annual Swamp Classic and 5A State Championships, as well as CrownBEAT, a Drum Corps International competition hosted by the Carolina Crown Drum and Bugle Corps.

== Feeder schools ==
Via Meadow Glen Middle School and Lakeside Middle School:

- Lexington Elementary
- Meadow Glen Elementary
- Midway Elementary school
- New Providence Elementary
- Oak Grove Elementary
- Meadow Glen Middle School
- Lakeside Middle School
