= Victor Riley =

American football player (1974–2024)

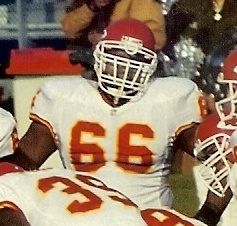
- Riley with the Kansas City Chiefs

No. 66, 68
- Position: Offensive tackle

Personal information
- Born: November 4, 1974; Swansea, South Carolina, U.S.
- Died: April 8, 2024 (aged 49); Swansea, South Carolina, U.S.
- Listed height: 6 ft 5 in (1.96 m)
- Listed weight: 340 lb (154 kg)

Career information
- High school: Swansea
- College: Auburn
- NFL draft: 1998: 1st round, 27th overall pick

Career history
- Kansas City Chiefs (1998–2001); New Orleans Saints (2002–2004); Houston Texans (2005)

Awards and highlights
- First-team All-American (1997); First-team All-SEC (1997)

Career NFL statistics
- Games played: 111
- Games started: 93
- Fumble recoveries: 2
- Stats at Pro Football Reference

Victor Allan Riley (November 4, 1974 – April 8, 2024) was an American professional football player who was an offensive tackle in the National Football League (NFL). Riley played college football for the Auburn Tigers. He was selected in the first round of the 1998 NFL draft by the Kansas City Chiefs, with whom he played for four seasons. He was the No. 7 offensive tackle available in the draft, according to Sports Illustrated. He also played for three seasons with the New Orleans Saints before signing in 2005 with the Houston Texans. Riley died in Swansea, South Carolina on April 8, 2024, at the age of 49.
