= David Jefferson Griffith House =

Historic house in South Carolina, United States

- U.S. National Register of Historic Places
- Nearest city: Gilbert, South Carolina
- Area: 1.1 acres (0.45 ha)
- Built: 1896
- Built by: Griffith, David J.
- Architectural style: Late Victorian
- MPS: Lexington County MRA
- NRHP reference No.: 83003879
- Added to NRHP: November 22, 1983

David Jefferson Griffith House is a historic home located near Gilbert, Lexington County, South Carolina. It was built in 1896, and is a rectangular, two-story frame, weatherboarded Late Victorian farmhouse with a standing seam metal hipped roof. It has a one-story, gable-roofed ell. The front façade features a two-tiered decorated porch. Also on the property is a hip-roofed well house.

It was listed on the National Register of Historic Places in 1983.
