= China Construction America =

Construction company

- Native name: 中建美国
- Industry: Engineering, construction, and real estate investment and development
- Founded: 1985; 41 years ago
- Headquarters: 525 Washington Blvd, Jersey City, New Jersey, U.S.
- Area served: The Americas
- Parent: China State Construction Engineering Corp. Ltd.
- Subsidiaries: Plaza Construction, CCA Civil, CCA South America, Strategic Capital
- Website: www.chinaconstruction.us

China Construction America (Chinese: 中建美国), founded in 1985, is a subsidiary of China State Construction Engineering Corporation Ltd. (CSCEC)—the world's largest construction and real estate conglomerate and the biggest global contractor—that operates on the East Coast of the U.S and the Gulf of Mexico, the Caribbean, and Latin America, having many finished and ongoing projects worldwide. CSCEC was ranked the 18th on Fortune Global 500 list.

Headquartered in Jersey City, NJ, CCA operates mainly in New York, New Jersey, Washington, DC, South Carolina, North Carolina, Louisiana, Florida, California, the Caribbean, and Panama. CCA provides a range of construction services, such as program management, construction management, general contracting, design-build and public-private partnership assistance for public and private clients.

CCA was ranked the 57th biggest contractors in the 2020 Engineering News-Record Top 400 Contractors list, the 35th biggest construction management-at-risk firms by ENR in 2020, the 35th on 2020 ENR Southeast Top Contractors, and the tenth on the Top Contractors in Bridges.

== History ==
Founded in 1985, China Construction America (CCA) is a subsidiary of China State Construction Engineering Corp. Ltd. (CSCEC). In 2001, the CCA office in the World Trade Center was destroyed in the September 11 terrorist attacks, the company had to move its headquarters from the World Trade Center to Jersey City. On April 4, 2014, CCA acquired Plaza Construction, one of the nation's leading construction management and general contracting companies. The sale is prompted by the dynamic growth of Plaza and Fisher Brothers' desire to focus on the development side of their business. According to Richard Wood, the CEO of Plaza Construction, the acquisition is more about creating strategic relationships and sharing resources. During October 2014, the New York State Supreme Court judge ruled that contractor China Construction America (CCA) owed damages worth $1.6bn to the developer of the Baha Mar resort in the Bahamas, as CCA breached contracts and committed fraud to force the project out of the developer's hands.

== Project highlights ==
Rehabilitation of the Alexander Hamilton Bridge, New York and Bronx, NY:

- No. 3 of Top 10 Bridges Award by Roads & Bridges Magazine, 2013
- Excellence in Partnering Award for Formal Partnering by the AGC of New York State, 2013
- Award of Merit Highways/Bridges by Engineering News-Record, 2014
- Construction Achievement Project of the Year Award by the ASCE Metropolitan Section, 2014
- Tien Yow Jeme Civil Engineering Prize by the China Civil Engineering Society (CCES), 2015

Ventilation Shafts for the 7 Subway Extension, New York, NY:

- Construction Achievement Project of the Year Award from the American Society of Civil Engineers, 2016
- ENR Best of the Best Award, 2016

Fulton Center, New York, NY:

- Project of the Year by New York State Society of Professional Engineers, 2014
- Diamond Award by American Council of Engineering Companies of New York, 2014
- Excellence Honorable Mention Award by Center for Active Design, 2015
- Best of Design Awards by The Architect's Newspaper, 2015
- MASterworks Best New Building Award by the Municipal Art Society of New York, 2015
- Construction Achievement Project of the Year Award by the ASCE Metropolitan Section, 2015

River Bluff High School, Lexington, SC:

- Excellence in Construction Awards, 2013

West Eighth Street–New York Aquarium station, Brooklyn, NY:

- Best of 2004 Award by New York Construction, 2004
- Design Award by AIA New York State, 2006

Power Plant, Astoria, NY:

- New York Tri-State's Top 40 Projects by New York Construction, 2005
- Best of 2006 by ENR New York, 2006
- New Project Award by General Building Contractors, 2007
- Building of America Award by Real Estate & Construction Review, 2009

Brookfield Place Glass Pavilion, New York, NY:

- Award of Merit: Office/Retail/Mixed-Use by ENR, 2014
- Innovative Design in Engineering and Architecture with Structural Steel (IDEAS2) and Merit Award for Excellence by the American Institute of Steel Construction (AISC), 2014
- Outstanding Public Space for 2014 by the Greater New York Construction User Council, 2014

One Thousand Museum, Miami, FL

Baha Mar Mega Resort, Nassau, The Bahamas

== Other projects ==
=== Infrastructure ===
- Pulaski Skyway, South Kearny, NJ
- Wittpenn Bridge, Kearny, NJ
- Replacement of Shore (Belt) Parkway Bridge over Gerritsen Inlet Bridge, New York, NY
- Staten Island Expressway, New York, NY
- Nassau Airport Gateway, Nassau, The Bahamas
- San Isidro Bus Station, San Miguelito, Panama

=== Real estate ===
- Park and Shore Luxury Condominiums, Jersey City, NJ
- 445 South Street, Morristown, NJ
- Broadstone Post Oak, Houston, TX
- The Pointe, Nassau, The Bahamas
- British Colonial Nassau Hilton Hotel, Nassau, The Bahamas

=== Hospitality and residential ===
- Baha Mar Mega Resort, Nassau, The Bahamas
- 150 Charles Street, New York, NY
- AC Hotel by Marriott^{sm}, Miami, FL
- Marquis Residences, Miami, FL
- Marea Condominiums, Miami, FL
- One Ocean South Beach, Miami, FL
- W South Beach, Miami, FL
- City of Hope, Panama City, Panama
- Beach House 8, Miami, FL
- Paraiso Bayviews, Miami, FL
- Gran Paraiso, Miami, FL

=== Education ===
- Clinton High School (South Carolina), Laurens County, SC
- River Bluff High School, Lexington, SC
- Nation Ford High School, Fort Mill, SC
- Dreher High School, Columbia, SC
- Chapman High School (Inman, South Carolina), Spartanburg County School District, SC
- Blue Ridge High School (South Carolina), Greenville, SC
- Santee High School and Technology Center, Los Angeles, CA

== Business divisions ==
- Plaza Construction
- CCA Civil
- CCA South America
- Strategic Capital
