= Dalton Freeman =

American football player (born 1990)

No. 63
- Position: Center

Personal information
- Born: June 18, 1990 (age 36); Pelion, South Carolina, U.S.
- Listed height: 6 ft 5 in (1.96 m)
- Listed weight: 300 lb (136 kg)

Career information
- High school: Pelion
- College: Clemson
- NFL draft: 2013: undrafted

Career history
- New York Jets (2013–2014); Buffalo Bills (2015)*; Houston Texans (2015–2016); Buffalo Bills (2016)*
- * Offseason or practice squad member only

Awards and highlights
- First-team All-American (2012); 2× First-team All-ACC (2011, 2012)

Career NFL statistics
- Games played: 16
- Games started: 1
- Stats at Pro Football Reference

Dalton Freeman (born June 18, 1990) is an American former professional football player who was a center in the National Football League (NFL). He played college football for the Clemson Tigers and was signed by the New York Jets as an undrafted free agent in 2013.

A native of Pelion, South Carolina, Freeman attended Pelion High School, where he was an All-American offensive lineman. Regarded as a four-star recruit by Rivals.com, Freeman was ranked as the No. 13 offensive guard in his class.

== Professional career ==
=== New York Jets ===
Freeman was signed by the New York Jets as an undrafted free agent on April 29, 2013. Freeman was released on August 28, 2013. Freeman was signed to the Jets' practice squad on September 1, 2013.

Freeman was waived by the Jets on August 30, 2015.

=== Buffalo Bills ===
Freeman was claimed off waivers from the Buffalo Bills on September 1, 2015. He was released by the Bills on September 5, 2015.

=== Houston Texans ===
Freeman was signed to the Texans' practice squad on November 24, 2015. On September 3, 2016, he was waived/injured by the Texans. He was released from injured reserve on September 12.

=== Buffalo Bills (second stint) ===
Freeman was signed to the Bills' practice squad on November 14, 2016.
