= South Carolina Highway 602 =

State highway in South Carolina, United States

South Carolina Highway 602

Route information
- Maintained by SCDOT
- Length: 10.690 mi (17.204 km)

Major junctions
- West end: SC 6 in Red Bank
- East end: Charleston Highway, D Avenue, and 13th Street in West Columbia

Location
- Country: United States
- State: South Carolina
- Counties: Lexington

Highway system
- South Carolina State Highway System; Interstate; US; State; Scenic
← US 601	→ SC 641

South Carolina Highway 602 (SC 602) is a 10.690-mile-long (17.204 km) state highway in the U.S. state of South Carolina. The highway connects Red Bank and West Columbia, via Springdale.

== Route description ==
SC 602 begins at an intersection with SC 6 (South Lake Drive) on the southern edge of Red Bank, within Lexington County, where the roadway continues as Platt Springs Road. It travels to the east, along the southern edge of Red Bank for a little less than 1 mile (1.6 km) and then leaves the city limits. Just to the west of South Congaree, the highway curves to the northeast and crosses Red Bank Creek. It travels to the northwest of South Congaree and crosses Pole Branch. Then, it crosses over Savana Branch just before it starts traveling along the southern edge of Springdale. While along the edge of the town, it passes Columbia Metropolitan Airport. Between the intersection with John N. Hardee Expressway and Ermine Road and the one with Lexington Drive and Wattling Road, SC 602 travels just north of Midlands Technical College's Airport Campus. At the second intersection, it enters Springdale proper. It then passes Wil Lou Gray Opportunity School and Airport High School. The highway crosses over Sixmile Creek just before it crosses over Interstate 26 (I-26). Almost immediately, it leaves Springdale and enters West Columbia. SC 602 passes by the George I. Pair Education Center. Just before an intersection with Taylor Street, the highway crosses over some railroad tracks. A short distance later, it meets its eastern terminus, an intersection with Charleston Highway (unsigned U.S. Route 21 Connector) and 13th Street. Here, the roadway continues as D Avenue.

== Major intersections ==
The entire route is in Lexington County.

Location	mi	km	Destinations	Notes
Red Bank	0.000	0.000	SC 6 (South Lake Drive) – Swansea, Lexington	Western terminus
West Columbia	10.690	17.204	Charleston Highway (US 21 Conn.) / 13th Street north / D Avenue east – Lexington	Eastern terminus of SC 602; southern terminus of 13th Street; D Avenue continues past terminus.
1.000 mi = 1.609 km; 1.000 km = 0.621 mi
