= White Knoll High School =

Public high school in Lexington, South Carolina

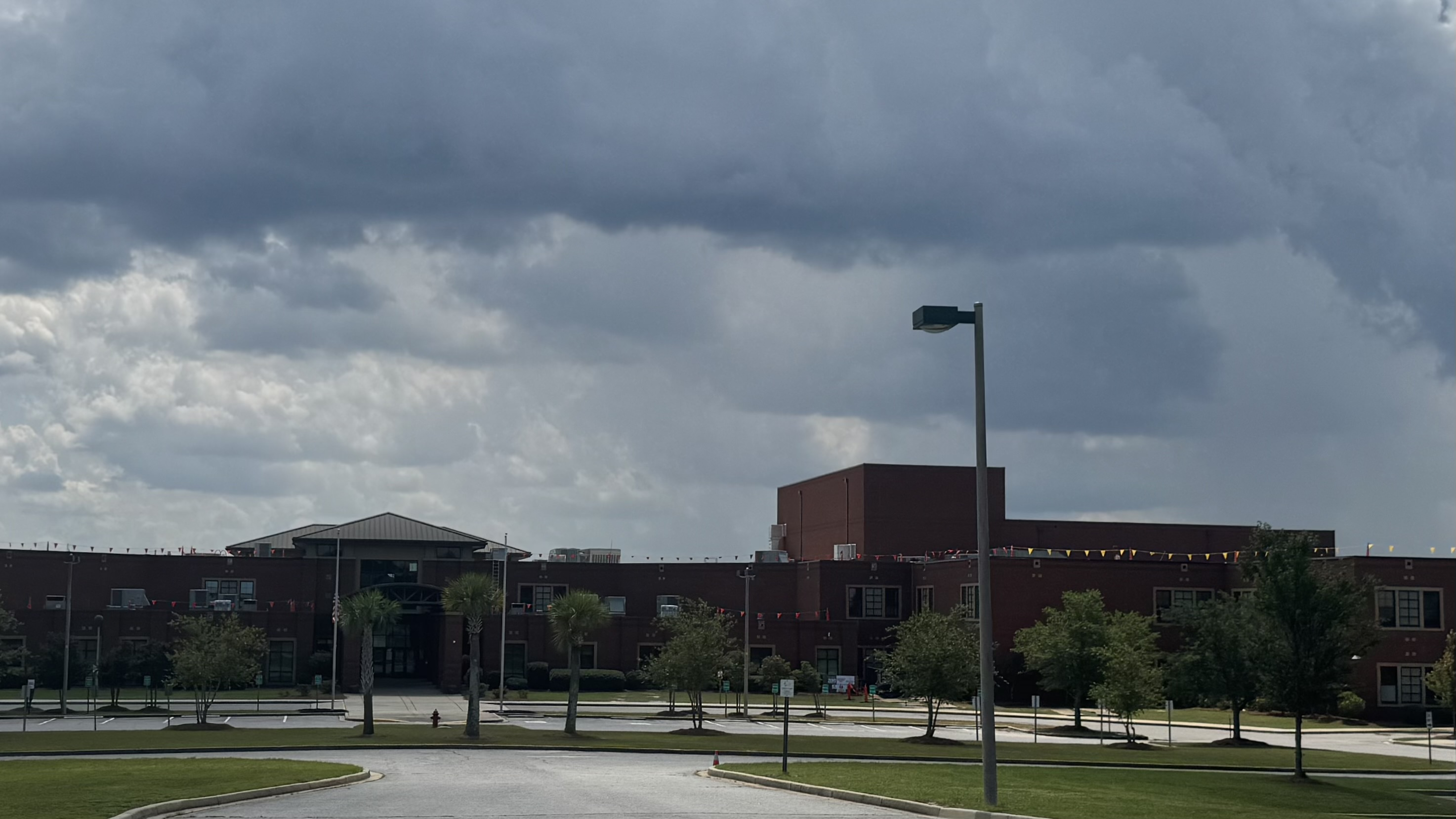
- White Knoll High School in 2026

Location
- 5643 Platt Springs Road; Lexington, South Carolina 29073; United States; 33°54′17″N 81°13′56″W

Information
- Type: Public
- Established: 2000 (26 years ago)
- School district: Lexington School District 1
- Superintendent: Gerrita L. Postlewait
- CEEB code: 411295
- Principal: Dr. KaRon Webb
- Teaching staff: 140.45 (FTE)
- Grades: 9–12
- Enrollment: 2,031 (2023–2024)
- Student to teacher ratio: 14.46
- Colors: Garnet, Silver, and Navy
- Fight song: Buckeye Battle Cry
- Athletics conference: Region V AAAAA
- Mascot: Timberwolves
- Accreditation: Southern Association of Colleges and Schools
- Yearbook: The Pack
- Website: wkhs.lexington1.net

White Knoll High School (WKHS) is a public high school in Lexington, South Carolina that provides education for ninth through twelfth grades, serving the White Knoll, Red Bank, and part of the Oak Grove areas of Lexington, South Carolina, as well as parts of the city of West Columbia. The school opened in 2000 to alleviate overcrowding at Lexington High School. The school's athletic mascot is the Timberwolf, and their news is called The Wolf View.

== Athletics ==
The school offers many sports including cheerleading, cross country and track, football, swimming, volleyball, basketball, wrestling, golf, bowling, lacrosse, soccer, tennis, softball, marching band, and colorguard/winterguard.

The baseball team won the state championship in 2010. The softball team won the state championship in 2018 and were the first for any women’s sport in the history of the school.

In 2023, the varsity football team made their first state championship appearance following a 21-14 semifinal victory over Summerville. Though they would ultimately fall to Dutch Fork in the championship game, it was the first year in program history the team went undefeated in the regular season.

== Bands ==
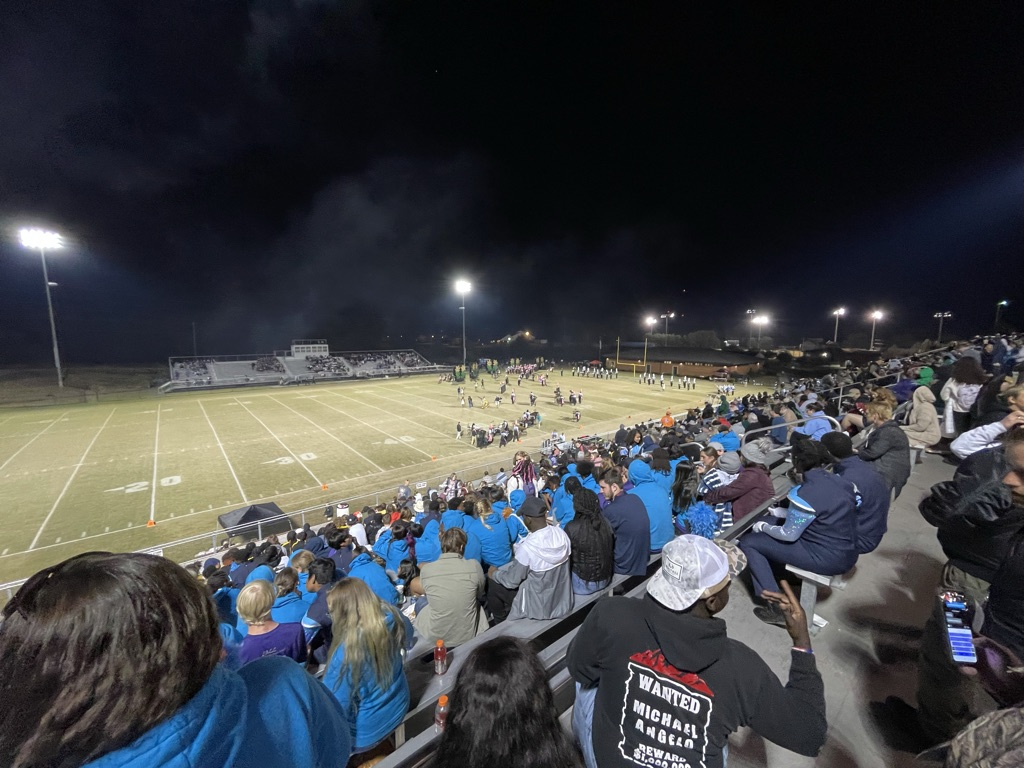
White Knoll High School Stadium during marching competition in 2022

The White Knoll High School Marching Band is a 2-time SCBDA State Champion winning back-to-back Class AAAA titles in 2010 and 2011. The Band is also a 13-time Lower State Champion winning its most recent championship in 2018 while in class AAAA.

White Knoll High School is a frequent venue for marching band competitions, hosting its annual Silver Invitational as well as AA and AAAA Lower State Championships.

White Knoll High School's Winter Guards and Indoor Drumline compete in CWEA. As CWEA's Circuit Champions primarily serve both North Carolina and South Carolina, schools have been declared state champions while not ranking first in the competition overall. This is true for the White Knoll Indoor Drumline in 2014, and the White Knoll Varsity Guard in 2018 who despite placing 2nd in Scholastic A Class were declared South Carolina's state champions as the state's highest placing schools.

== Feeder patterns ==
The following middle schools feed into White Knoll High School:

- White Knoll Middle School
- Carolina Springs Middle School

via White Knoll Middle School:

- White Knoll Elementary School
- Saxe Gotha Elementary School
- Oak Grove Elementary School

via Carolina Springs Middle School:

- Carolina Springs Elementary School
- Red Bank Elementary School
- Deerfield Elementary School
- South Lake Elementary School

== Notable alumni ==
- David Anderson, MiLB first baseman
- Adam Matthews, MiLB right fielder
- Aveon Smith, Quarterback for the Miami RedHawks
- Andrew Bond, Wide Receiver for the Northern Illinois Huskies
- Jaiden Kimble, Linebacker for the South Carolina State Bulldogs

== See also ==
- List of high schools in South Carolina
