= Swansea (disambiguation) =

Swansea is a city and county in Wales.

Swansea may also refer to:

== Places ==
=== Wales ===
- Swansea City Centre
- Swansea Urban Area
- City and County of Swansea council, the local council for Swansea
- District of Swansea, one of the four local government districts of West Glamorgan, Wales from 1974 to 1996
- Swansea Valley

=== Australia ===
- Swansea, Tasmania
- Swansea, New South Wales
  - Electoral district of Swansea

=== Canada ===
- Swansea, Toronto, a community in Toronto

=== Jamaica ===
- Swansea Cave

=== United States ===
- Swansea, Arizona (ghost town)
- Swansea, California (ghost town)
- Swansea, Illinois
- Swansea, Massachusetts
- Swansea, Nevada (ghost town)
- Swansea, South Carolina
- Swansea Vineyards, a winery in New Jersey

== Sports ==
- Swansea City A.F.C., a Championship club based in Swansea, Wales
- Swansea RFC, a Welsh Rugby Union club based in Swansea, Wales

== Music ==
- "Swansea", a song by Joanna Newsom from The Milk-Eyed Mender

== Fictional characters ==
- Swansea, from the video game Mouthwashing
