= Baha Mar =

Hotel and casino in The Bahamas

Coordinates: 25°4′24″N 77°23′52″W

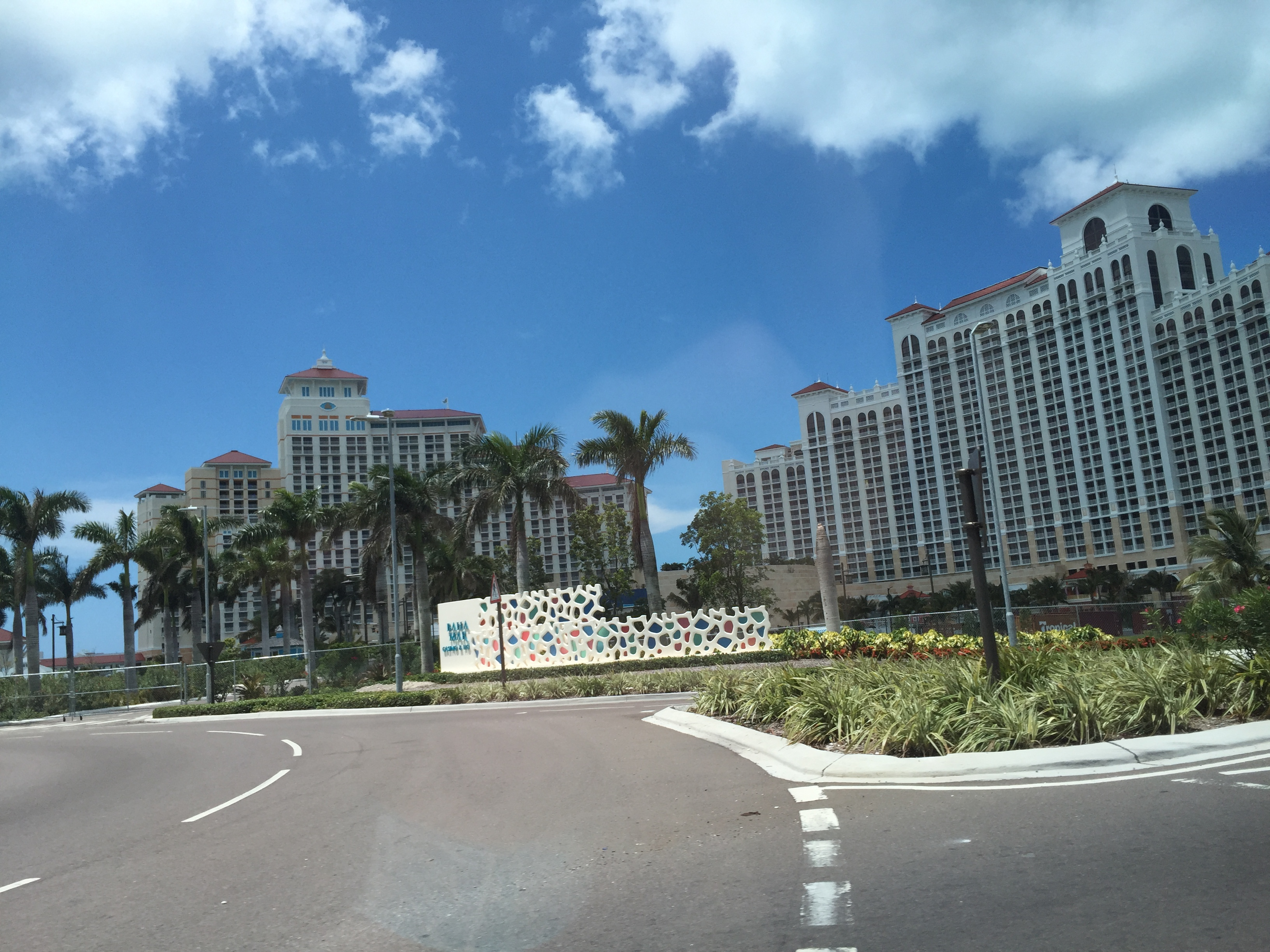
- The Baha Mar resort
- Location: Nassau, Bahamas
- No. of rooms: 2,200
- Gaming space: 100,000 sq ft (9,300 m^{2})
- Casino type: Land-based
- Owner: Chow Tai Fook Enterprises
- Website: bahamar.com

Baha Mar is a 1,000-acre (400 ha) resort complex on the island of New Providence in The Bahamas. Owned by Hong Kong–based Chow Tai Fook Enterprises, the establishment opened in April 2017. The amenities include three hotels (a Grand Hyatt, SLS Baha Mar, and the Rosewood) with a total of 2,200 rooms, 284 private residences, a 100,000-square-foot (9,300 m^{2}) casino, a 30,000-square-foot (2,800 m^{2}) spa, and a Tournament Players Club golf course designed by Jack Nicklaus.

On 30 March 2010, a local Bahamas-based investor and the government announced an agreement on the redevelopment of the resort to help revitalize Cable Beach, the most popular beachfront destination on New Providence Island. The project would subsequently be joined by other investors, which led to it being financed by China Exim Bank, while construction would be performed by China Construction America and would be using 70% Chinese labor brought in from mainland China. Groundbreaking for the redevelopment took place on 21 February 2011 with the resort opening expected on 27 March 2015. The whole project would eventually cost around US$4 billion. By April 2016, construction was halted for nearly a year with the resort 97% complete following the original investor's Chapter 11 bankruptcy filed in 2015 in a Delaware court (sidestepping Bahamas jurisdiction) but dismissed in September. A Bahamian judge subsequently put provisional liquidators in charge.

In December 2016, Chow Tai Fook agreed to buy Baha Mar from the Exim Bank. Chow Tai Fook assumed management of the property in March 2017, and completed its purchase in December 2017.

The resort initially opened with only one hotel, the Grand Hyatt. The SLS opened in November 2017, followed by the Rosewood in June 2018.

== See also ==
- List of integrated resorts
- Bahamas Championship
