= Gilbert High School (South Carolina) =

Public high school in Gilbert, South Carolina, United States

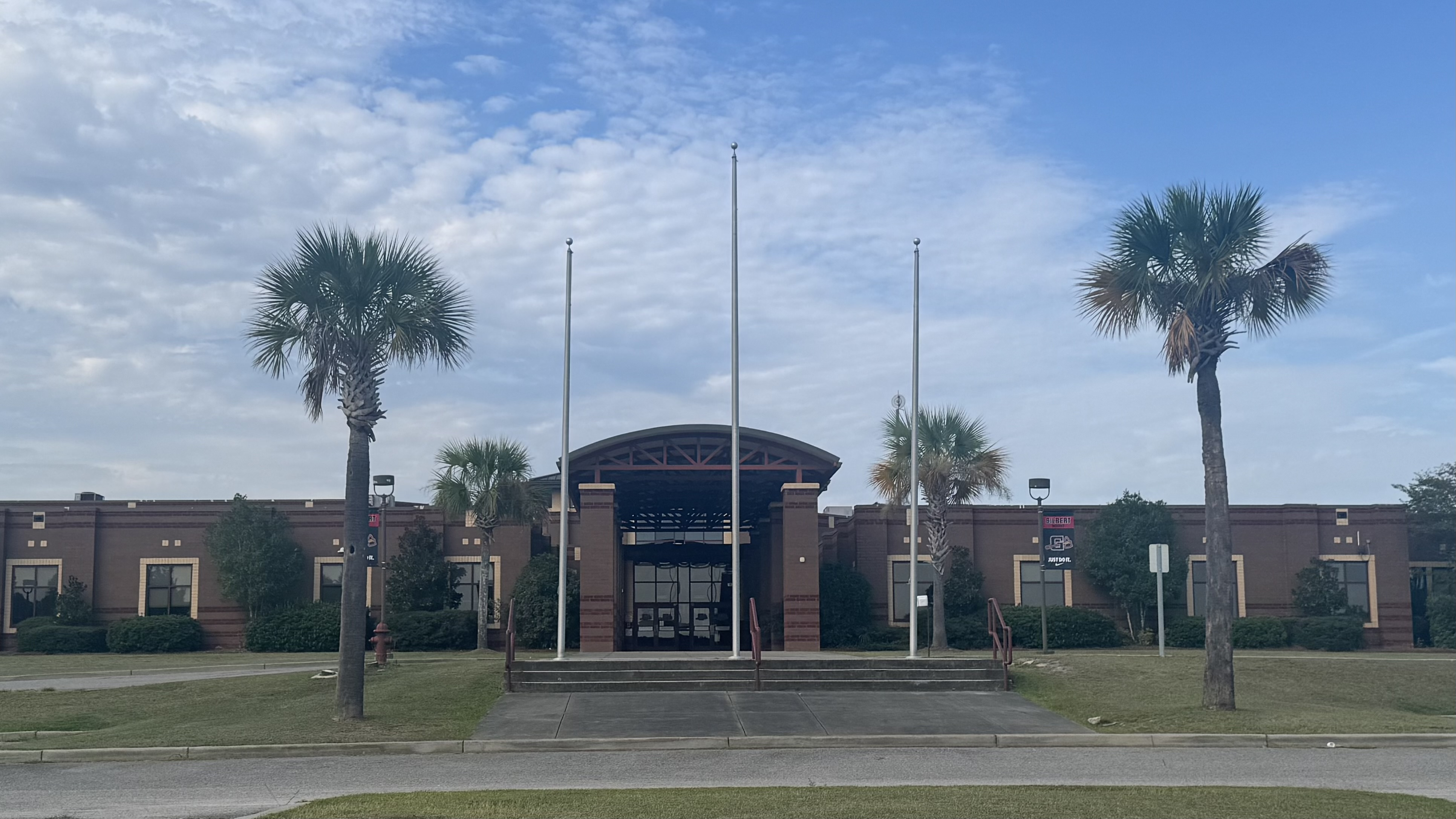

Location
- 840 Main Street; Gilbert, Lexington County, South Carolina 29054; United States; 33°54′39″N 81°23′25″W

Information
- Type: Public
- Motto: Empowering 21st Century Learners
- School district: Lexington School District 1
- Oversight: South Carolina Department of Education
- Superintendent: Keith Price
- CEEB code: 410825
- Principal: David Dixon
- Teaching staff: 80.50 (FTE)
- Grades: 9–12
- Enrollment: 1,131 (2023–2024)
- Student to teacher ratio: 14.05
- Schedule: 8:15 a.m. – 3:30 p.m.
- Hours in school day: 7
- Campus type: Rural
- Colors: Red and black
- Athletics conference: Region V AAAA
- Mascot: The Indians
- Rival: Lexington High School wildcats
- Accreditation: Southern Association of Colleges and Schools
- Website: ghs.lexington1.net

Gilbert High School is a public high school located in Gilbert, South Carolina that provides education for ninth through twelfth grade. It is one of five high schools that are a part of Lexington School District 1.

== History ==
As of 2023, the high school has achieved 100 years as an accredited school in South Carolina. The school began operating in 1876 and received accreditation in 1923 with an enrollment of 52 students. In the 1950s, they changed their mascot to the Indians, with red and black as their team colors, having originally been the Lions, with blue and gold as their colors.

== State championships ==
- Baseball (1988, 2006, 2008, 2012, 2021)
- FFA (1962)
- Girls Golf (2021)
- Junior Varsity Cheerleaders (1995)
- Marching Band (1995, 1996, 2011)
- Men's cross country (2004)
- Rugby (2007, 2009, 2010)
- Women's track (1986)
- Women's volleyball (1996, 1997)
