= Lexington School District 1 =

School district in South Carolina, United States

Lexington County School District One

Location
- 100 Tarrar Springs Road, Lexington, SC Lexington County, South Carolina United States
- Coordinates: 33.9766°N 81.2114°W

District information
- Type: Public
- Motto: "Where Children and Learning Are One"
- Grades: Pre-Kindergarten–12
- Superintendent: Keith Price
- Schools: 31

Students and staff
- Students: 27,300
- Staff: 1,827 teachers

Other information
- Website: www.lexington1.net

Lexington School District One, or Lexington One, is a school district in Lexington County, South Carolina, serving the greater areas of Lexington, Pelion, and Gilbert. Lexington One is the largest school district in Lexington County and the 6th largest school district in the state of South Carolina with an enrollment of 27,300 students.

== Enrollment and geography ==
Lexington One serves more than 27,300 students from pre-school-kindergarten to grade 12 with more than 3,900 employees and 31 schools: 17 elementary schools; 8 middle schools; 5 high schools and 1 technology center. Lexington One is made up of 360 square miles, stretching from Lake Murray to Lexington County's southern border with Aiken County. Lexington One occupies 48% of Lexington County's 750 square miles. The 2010 Census Data shows Lexington County's population as 262,391 and the area that makes up Lexington One's population as 121,030 or 46% of the county. From 2003 to 2013 Lexington One grew by an average of 511 new students per year.

== Schools ==
Public schools in Lexington One (2019 data)
Elementary Schools	Enrollment	Municipality
Pleasant Hill Elementary School	948	Lexington
Midway Elementary School	947	Lexington
Meadow Glen Elementary School	908	Lexington
Carolina Springs Elementary School	800	Lexington
Gilbert Primary School	780	Gilbert
Lake Murray Elementary School	759	Lexington
Saxe Gotha Elementary School	752	Lexington
Southlake Elementary School		Lexington
Gilbert Elementary School	743	Gilbert
Rocky Creek Elementary	730	Lexington
Deerfield Elementary School	723	Lexington
Oak Grove Elementary School	715	Lexington
White Knoll Elementary	711	West Columbia
New Providence Elementary School	672	Lexington
Lexington Elementary School	644	Lexington
Pelion Elementary School	631	Pelion
Red Bank Elementary School	579	Lexington
Forts Pond Elementary School	567	Pelion
Centerville Elementary School	opens 2020	Gilbert
Middle Schools	Enrollment	Municipality
Pleasant Hill Middle School	1,208	Lexington
Meadow Glen Middle School	1,029	Lexington
Lakeside Middle School	992	Lexington
Carolina Springs Middle	930	Lexington
Beechwood Middle School	850	Lexington
White Knoll Middle School	787	West Columbia
Gilbert Middle School	770	Gilbert
Pelion Middle School	578	Pelion
High schools	Enrollment	Municipality
Lexington High School	2,105	Lexington
River Bluff High School	2,047	Lexington
White Knoll High School	1,955	Lexington
Gilbert High School	1,022	Gilbert
Pelion High School	680	Pelion
Lexington Technology Center	(Note: The Lexington Technology Center offers technical classes to students from all Lexington One high schools, and has no fixed enrollment.)	Lexington
Adult education schools	Enrollment	Municipality
Rosenwald Community Learning Center (Note: This building used to be a black school until the district desegregated in 1969. The building became Lexington Intermediate School until the 2010s, serving grades 5-6.)	100 (Note: Enrollment varies depending on the time of year. This figure is not included in the total enrollment.)	Lexington
Total Enrollment	27,300	

== Demographics ==
Racial demographics (2018-2019)
Race	%
White	73.1%
Hispanic/Latino	15.4%
African American	5%
Two or more races	4.8%
Asian	.5%
Other	1.2%

== Leadership ==
The Lexington County School District One Board of Trustees, who are elected to four-year terms every presidential election, meet and manage the school district's policies and finances. Dr. Keith Price was hired in 2025 and is the current superintendent of Lexington One.
