= Lexington School District 4 =

School district in South Carolina, United States

Address
- 607 E 5th St Gaston, South Carolina and Swansea, South Carolina Swansea, Lexington County, South Carolina, 29160; United States

District information
- Type: School District
- Grades: 3K–Grade 12
- Superintendent: Dr. Justin Nutter
- Schools: 7

Other information
- Website: Home page

Lexington School District 4 is a school district in Lexington County, South Carolina, United States, serving the communities of Gaston, South Carolina and Swansea, South Carolina. The district serves 3K-Grade 12.

District employees:

- Dr. Justin Nutter-Superintendent

Schools:

- Early Childhood Center: 3K-5K
- Sandhills Primary: Grade 1-Grade 2
- Sandhills Elementary: Grade 3-Grade 4
- Frances F. Mack Intermediate: Grade 5-Grade 6
- Sandhills Middle: Grade 7-Grade 8
- Swansea High Freshmen Academy: Grade 9
- Swansea High School: Grade 10-Grade 12
