= Gilbert, South Carolina =

- Town
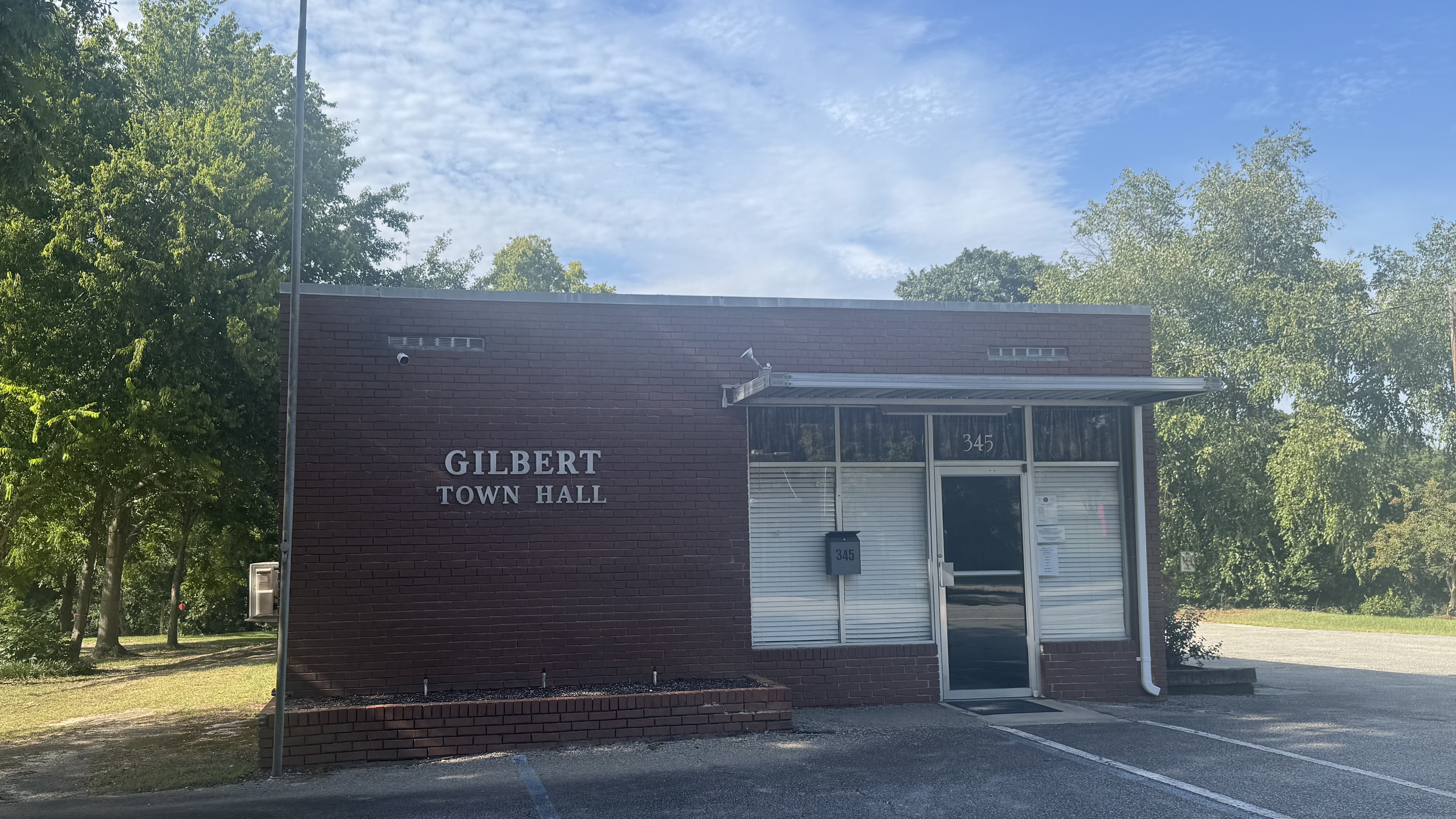
- Gilbert Town Hall

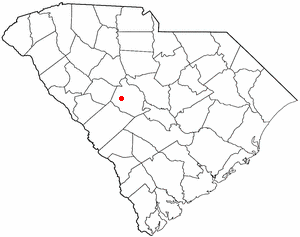
- Location of Gilbert, South Carolina
- Coordinates: 33°55′28″N 81°23′34″W
- Country: United States
- State: South Carolina
- County: Lexington

Area
  - Total: 2.77 sq mi (7.18 km^{2})
  - Land: 2.71 sq mi (7.02 km^{2})
  - Water: 0.062 sq mi (0.16 km^{2})
- Elevation: 541 ft (165 m)

Population (2020)
  - Total: 571
  - Density: 210.7/sq mi (81.36/km^{2})
- Time zone: UTC-5 (Eastern (EST))
  - Summer (DST): UTC-4 (EDT)
- ZIP code: 29054
- Area codes: 803, 839
- FIPS code: 45-29050
- GNIS feature ID: 2406568
- Website: www.townofgilbertsc.com

Gilbert is a town in Lexington County, South Carolina, United States. As of the 2020 census, Gilbert had a population of 571. It is part of the Columbia, South Carolina Metropolitan Statistical Area.

== History ==
The David Jefferson Griffith House and Music Hall Evangelical Lutheran Church were listed on the U.S. National Register of Historic Places in 1983.

== Geography ==
According to the United States Census Bureau, the town has a total area of 2.3 square miles (6.0 km^{2}), of which 2.3 square miles (6.0 km^{2}) is land and 0.1 square miles (0.26 km^{2}) (2.58%) is water. The adjacent town of Summit is located directly west of Gilbert.

== Demographics ==
Historical population
| Census | Pop. | Note | %± |
|---|---|---|---|
| 1880 | 141 | | — |
| 1890 | 115 | | −18.4% |
| 1900 | 178 | | 54.8% |
| 1910 | 162 | | −9.0% |
| 1920 | 226 | | 39.5% |
| 1930 | 235 | | 4.0% |
| 1940 | 153 | | −34.9% |
| 1950 | 172 | | 12.4% |
| 1960 | 171 | | −0.6% |
| 1970 | 186 | | 8.8% |
| 1980 | 211 | | 13.4% |
| 1990 | 324 | | 53.6% |
| 2000 | 500 | | 54.3% |
| 2010 | 565 | | 13.0% |
| 2020 | 571 | | 1.1% |
U.S. Decennial Census

As of the census of 2000, there were 500 people, 181 households, and 148 families residing in the town. The population density was 220.7 inhabitants per square mile (85.2/km^{2}). There were 195 housing units at an average density of 86.1 per square mile (33.2/km^{2}). The racial makeup of the town was 94.60% White, 3.60% African American, 0.20% Native American, 0.20% Asian, 0.20% from other races, and 1.20% from two or more races. Hispanic or Latino of any race were 1.60% of the population.

There were 181 households, out of which 53.0% had children under the age of 18 living with them, 56.4% were married couples living together, 16.6% had a female householder with no husband present, and 18.2% were non-families. 16.0% of all households were made up of individuals, and 6.6% had someone living alone who was 65 years of age or older. The average household size was 2.76 and the average family size was 3.05.

In the town, the population was spread out, with 33.2% under the age of 18, 7.0% from 18 to 24, 32.4% from 25 to 44, 19.6% from 45 to 64, and 7.8% who were 65 years of age or older. The median age was 32 years. For every 100 females, there were 93.8 males. For every 100 females age 18 and over, there were 96.5 males.

The median income for a household in the town was $46,563, and the median income for a family was $52,500. Males had a median income of $35,707 versus $25,000 for females. The per capita income for the town was $19,909. About 8.9% of families and 8.6% of the population were below the poverty line, including 11.3% of those under age 18 and 15.6% of those age 65 or over.

== Arts and culture ==
Gilbert hosts the annual Lexington County Peach Festival, held in July.

Gilbert has a public library, a branch of the Lexington County Library.

== Education ==
Public education in Gilbert is administered by Lexington School District 1. The district operates Centerville Elementary School, Gilbert Elementary School, Gilbert Middle School, and Gilbert High School, all of which are in Gilbert.

The Gilbert-Summit Branch of the Lexington County Public Library serves both communities.
