= Pelion, South Carolina =

- Town
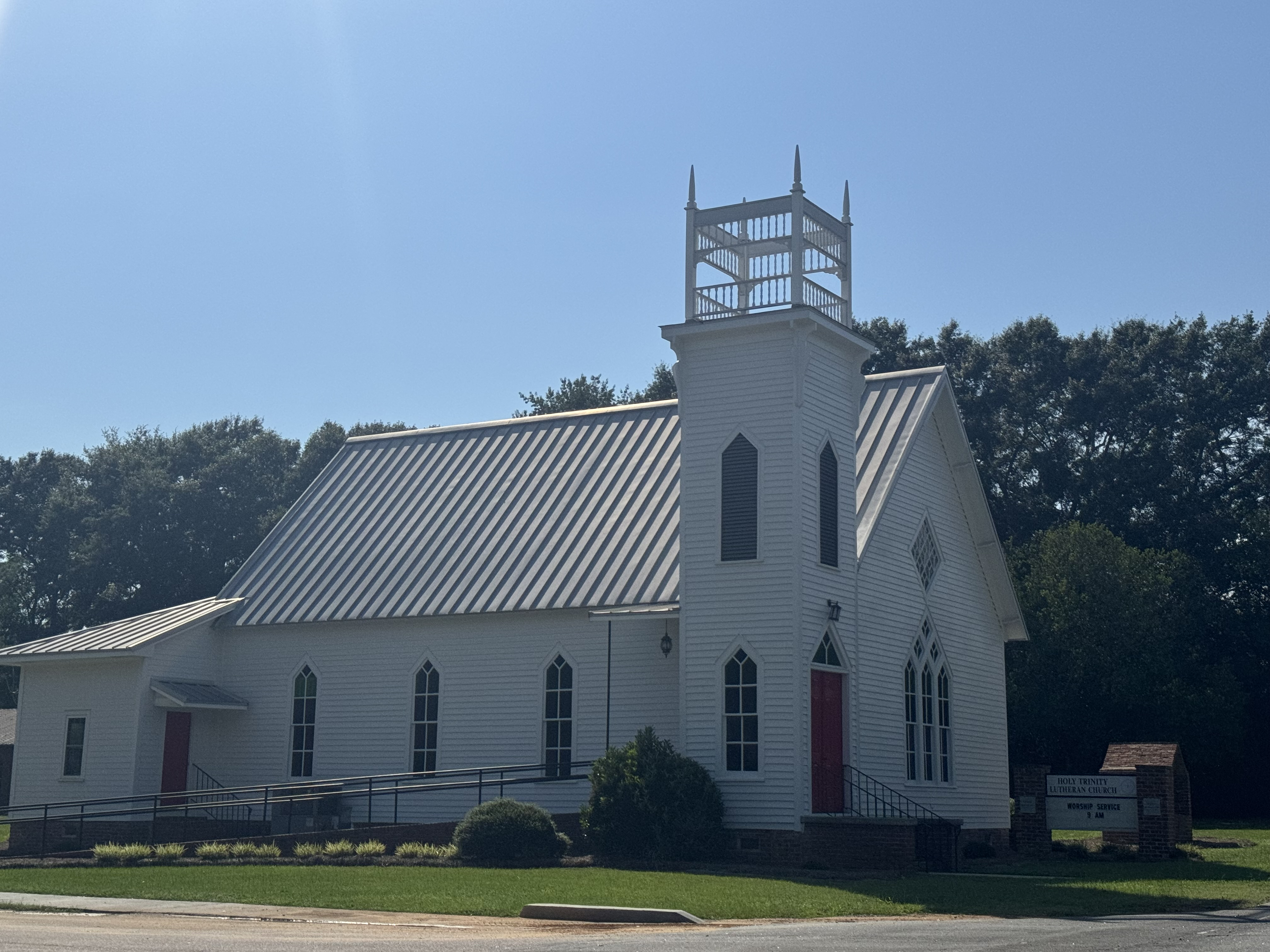
- Holy Trinity Lutheran Church in Pelion

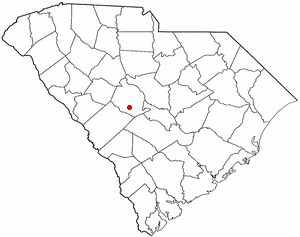
- Location in Lexington County, South Carolina
- Coordinates: 33°46′05″N 81°14′50″W
- Country: United States
- State: South Carolina
- County: Lexington
- Incorporated: 1912

Area
  - Total: 3.77 sq mi (9.77 km^{2})
  - Land: 3.68 sq mi (9.54 km^{2})
  - Water: 0.089 sq mi (0.23 km^{2})
- Elevation: 443 ft (135 m)

Population (2020)
  - Total: 631
  - Density: 171.4/sq mi (66.18/km^{2})
- Time zone: UTC-5 (EST)
  - Summer (DST): UTC-4 (EDT)
- ZIP code: 29123
- Area codes: 803, 839
- FIPS code: 45-55420
- GNIS feature ID: 2407091

Pelion is a town in Lexington County, South Carolina, United States. As of the 2020 census, Pelion had a population of 631. It is part of the Columbia, South Carolina Metropolitan Statistical Area .

== History ==
A post office called Pelion has been in operation since 1900. The town was named after Mt Pelion in Greece.

== Geography ==
According to the United States Census Bureau, the town has a total area of 3.6 square miles (9.2 km^{2}), of which 3.5 square miles (9.0 km^{2}) is land and 0.1 square mile (0.3 km^{2}) (2.81%) is water.

=== Climate ===
Pelion has a humid subtropical climate (Köppen: Cfa) with long, hot summers and short, mild winters.

Climate data for Pelion (1991–2020 normals, extremes 1947–present)
Month	Jan	Feb	Mar	Apr	May	Jun	Jul	Aug	Sep	Oct	Nov	Dec	Year
Record high °F (°C)	83 (28)	85 (29)	89 (32)	94 (34)	102 (39)	104 (40)	107 (42)	107 (42)	101 (38)	105 (41)	89 (32)	81 (27)	107 (42)
Mean maximum °F (°C)	73.0 (22.8)	76.3 (24.6)	82.9 (28.3)	87.9 (31.1)	92.7 (33.7)	96.5 (35.8)	98.3 (36.8)	97.8 (36.6)	93.6 (34.2)	88.1 (31.2)	80.6 (27.0)	74.1 (23.4)	98.9 (37.2)
Mean daily maximum °F (°C)	58.7 (14.8)	61.7 (16.5)	69.8 (21.0)	78.0 (25.6)	85.0 (29.4)	90.4 (32.4)	93.3 (34.1)	92.0 (33.3)	87.0 (30.6)	78.7 (25.9)	68.3 (20.2)	61.1 (16.2)	77.0 (25.0)
Daily mean °F (°C)	46.4 (8.0)	49.2 (9.6)	55.9 (13.3)	64.6 (18.1)	72.8 (22.7)	79.5 (26.4)	82.7 (28.2)	81.4 (27.4)	76.0 (24.4)	65.7 (18.7)	54.8 (12.7)	48.6 (9.2)	64.8 (18.2)
Mean daily minimum °F (°C)	34.2 (1.2)	36.4 (2.4)	42.1 (5.6)	51.2 (10.7)	60.7 (15.9)	68.6 (20.3)	72.2 (22.3)	70.9 (21.6)	64.9 (18.3)	52.8 (11.6)	41.3 (5.2)	36.2 (2.3)	52.6 (11.5)
Mean minimum °F (°C)	14.4 (−9.8)	17.3 (−8.2)	22.2 (−5.4)	31.2 (−0.4)	43.3 (6.3)	55.3 (12.9)	61.9 (16.6)	58.9 (14.9)	50.1 (10.1)	32.7 (0.4)	21.9 (−5.6)	17.0 (−8.3)	13.3 (−10.4)
Record low °F (°C)	−2 (−19)	2 (−17)	−1 (−18)	17 (−8)	31 (−1)	42 (6)	51 (11)	50 (10)	36 (2)	22 (−6)	10 (−12)	3 (−16)	−2 (−19)
Average precipitation inches (mm)	4.40 (112)	4.20 (107)	4.13 (105)	3.55 (90)	3.39 (86)	5.50 (140)	5.80 (147)	5.49 (139)	4.44 (113)	3.72 (94)	3.23 (82)	4.13 (105)	51.98 (1,320)
Average precipitation days (≥ 0.01)	9.2	8.9	8.5	7.3	8.0	10.6	11.2	10.3	7.4	6.5	7.0	9.2	104.1
Source: NOAA IEM

== Demographics ==
Historical population
Census	Pop.	Note	%±
1920	184		—
1930	200		8.7%
1940	212		6.0%
1950	196		−7.5%
1960	233		18.9%
1970	216		−7.3%
1980	213		−1.4%
1990	336		57.7%
2000	553		64.6%
2010	674		21.9%
2020	631		−6.4%
U.S. Decennial Census

As of the census of 2000, there were 553 people, 192 households, and 147 families residing in the town. The population density was 159.7 inhabitants per square mile (61.7/km^{2}). There were 211 housing units at an average density of 60.9 per square mile (23.5/km^{2}). The racial makeup of the town was 96.75% White, 0.72% African American, 0.18% Native American, 0.90% Asian, 0.54% from other races, and 0.90% from two or more races. Hispanic or Latino of any race were 2.17% of the population.

There were 192 households, out of which 42.2% included children under the age of 18 living with them, 66.1% were married couples living together, 7.8% had a female householder with no husband present, and 23.4% were non-families. 20.3% of all households were made up of individuals, and 9.4% had someone living alone who was 65 years of age or older. The average household size was 2.69 and the average family size was 3.14.

In the town, the population was spread out, with 27.5% under the age of 18, 8.3% from 18 to 24, 28.8% from 25 to 44, 21.9% from 45 to 64, and 13.6% who were 65 years of age or older. The median age was 35 years. For every 100 females, there were 84.9 males. For every 100 females age 18 and over, there were 81.4 males.

The median income for a household in the town was $42,222, and the median income for a family was $47,917. Males had a median income of $31,696 versus $25,769 for females. The per capita income for the town was $14,838. About 6.1% of families and 12.1% of the population were below the poverty line, including 7.9% of those under age 18 and 17.5% of those age 65 or over.

== Education ==
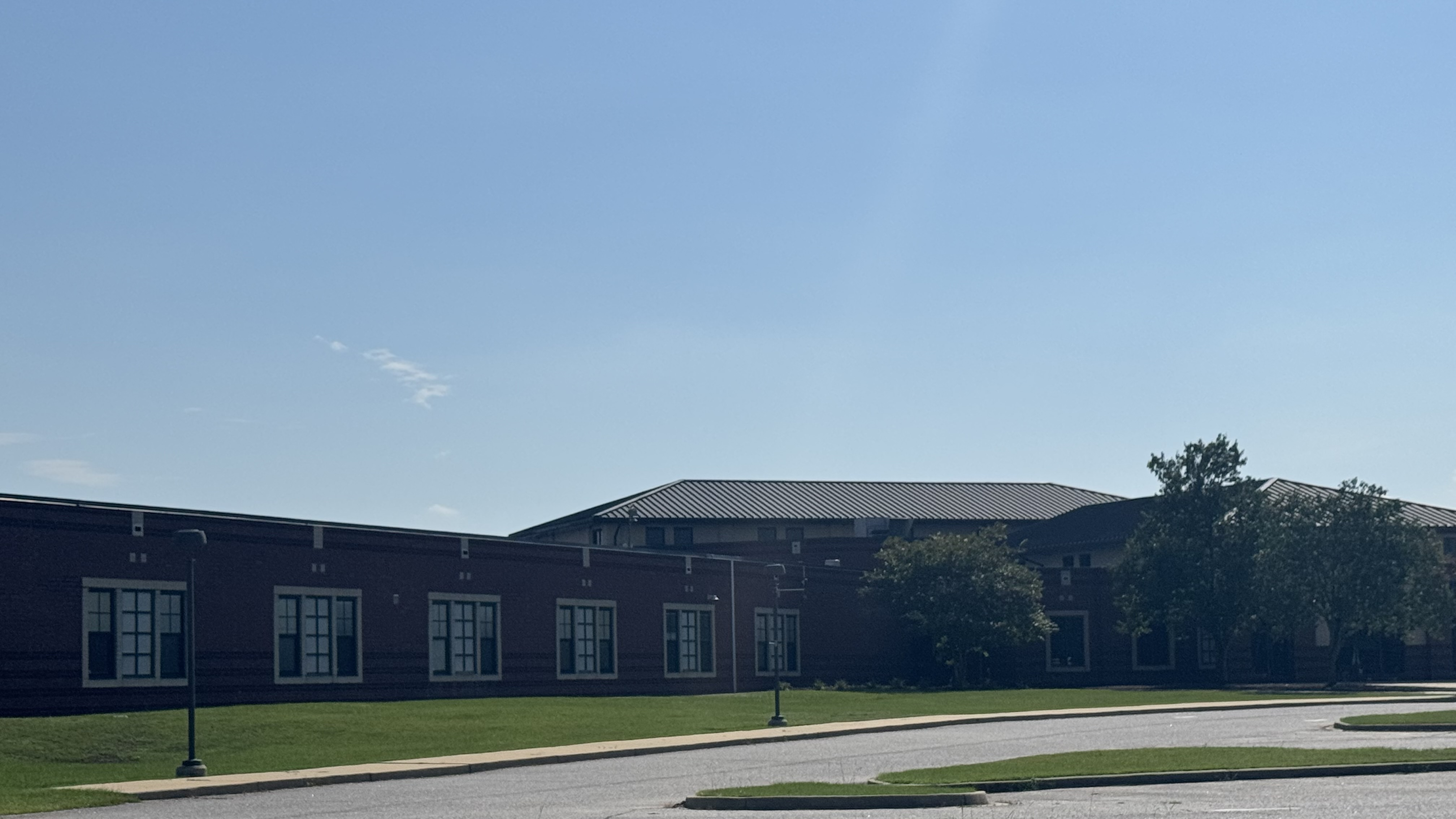
Pelion High School

Pelion has a public library, a branch of the Lexington County Public Library.

Most of Pelion is served by Lexington County School District One, and zoned for Pelion High School, Pelion Middle School, Pelion Elementary School, and Forts Pond Elementary School. A portion of Pelion is served by Lexington School District 4, along with neighboring Swansea.

== Notable people ==
- Paul Benjamin - actor born in Pelion
- Dalton Freeman - NFL player
- Michael Graham - radio personality, American talk radio host and columnist raised in Pelion
