= Columbia, South Carolina =

Capital city of South Carolina, United States

Columbia
- State capital city
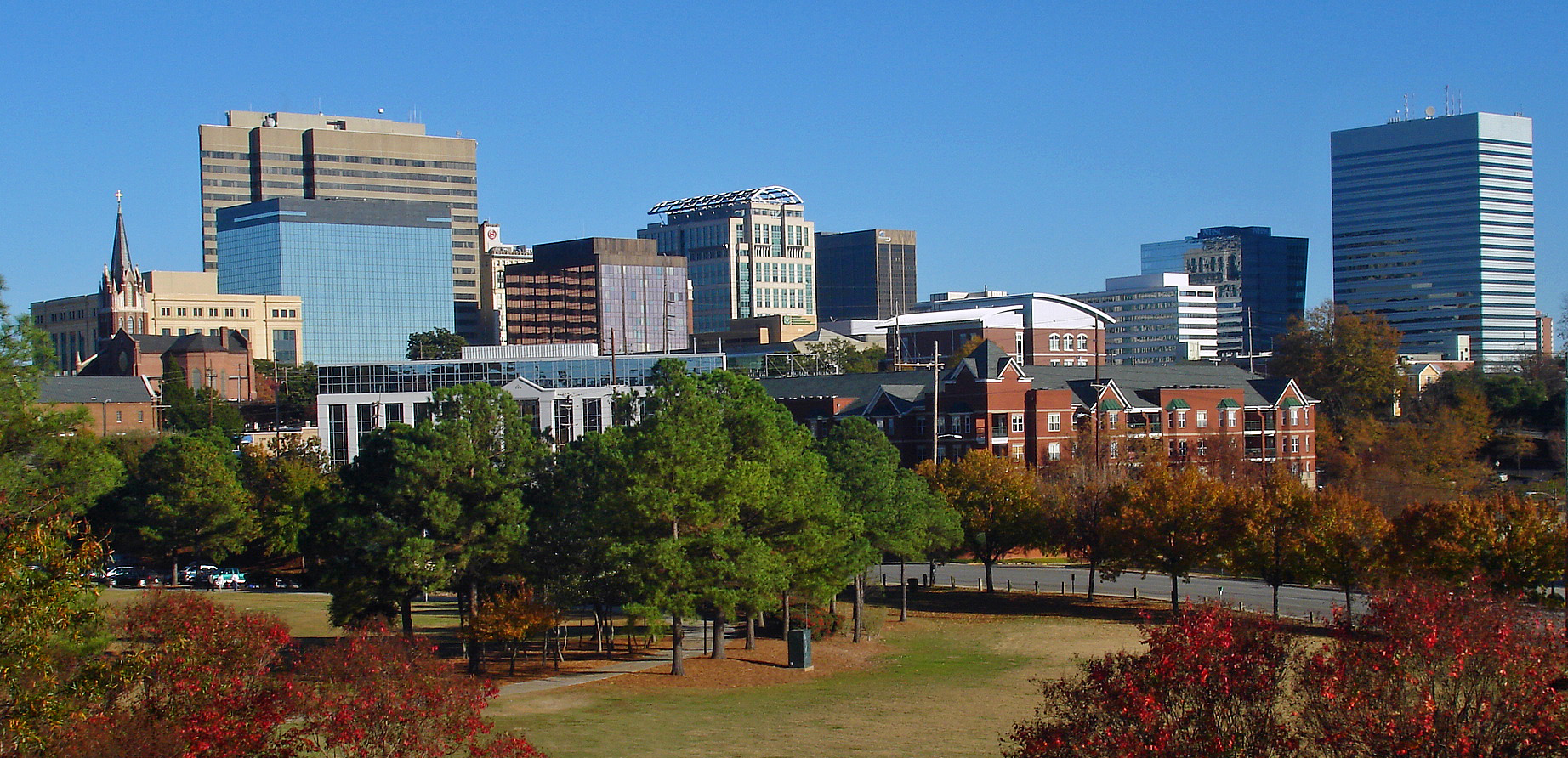
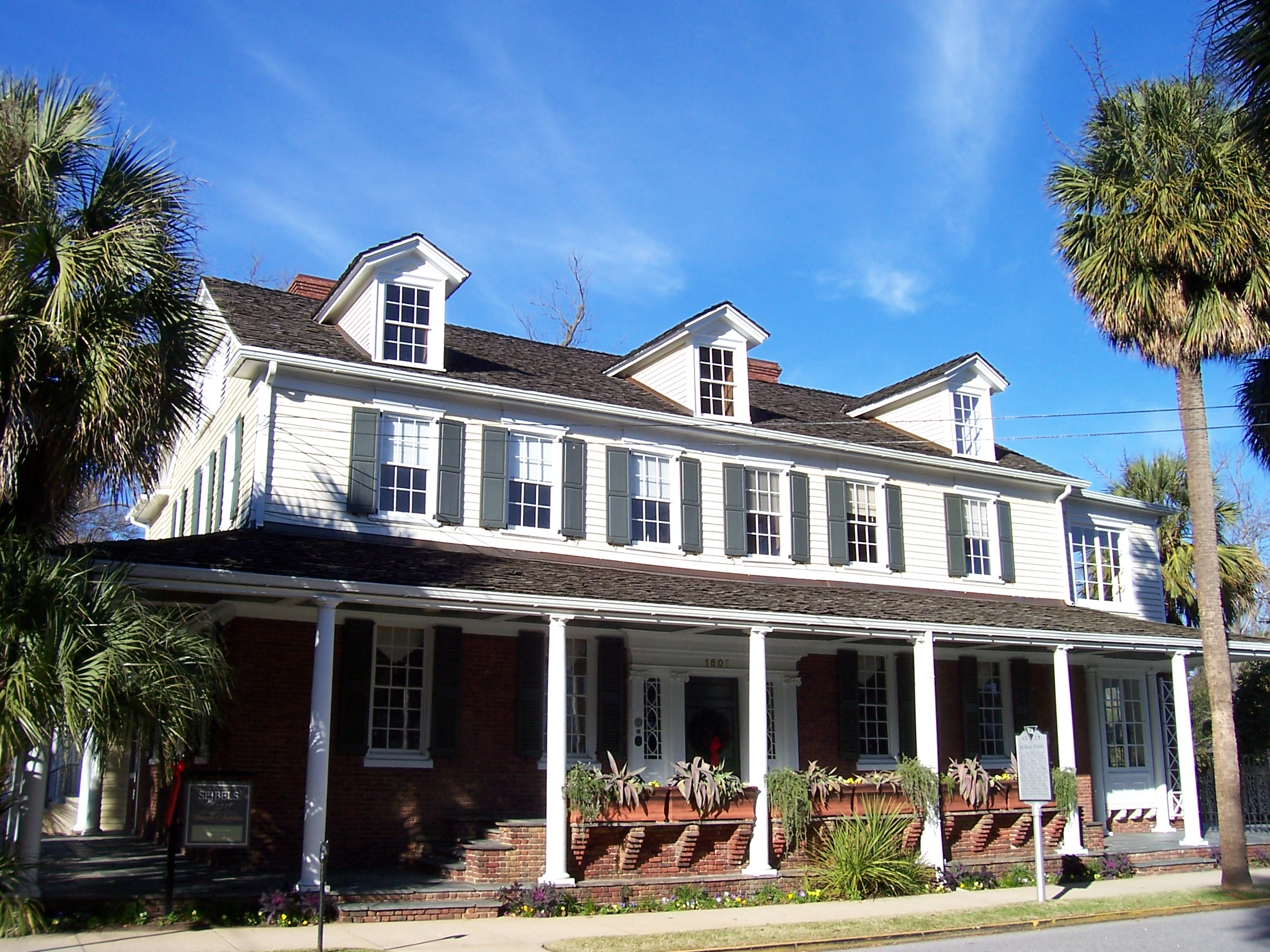
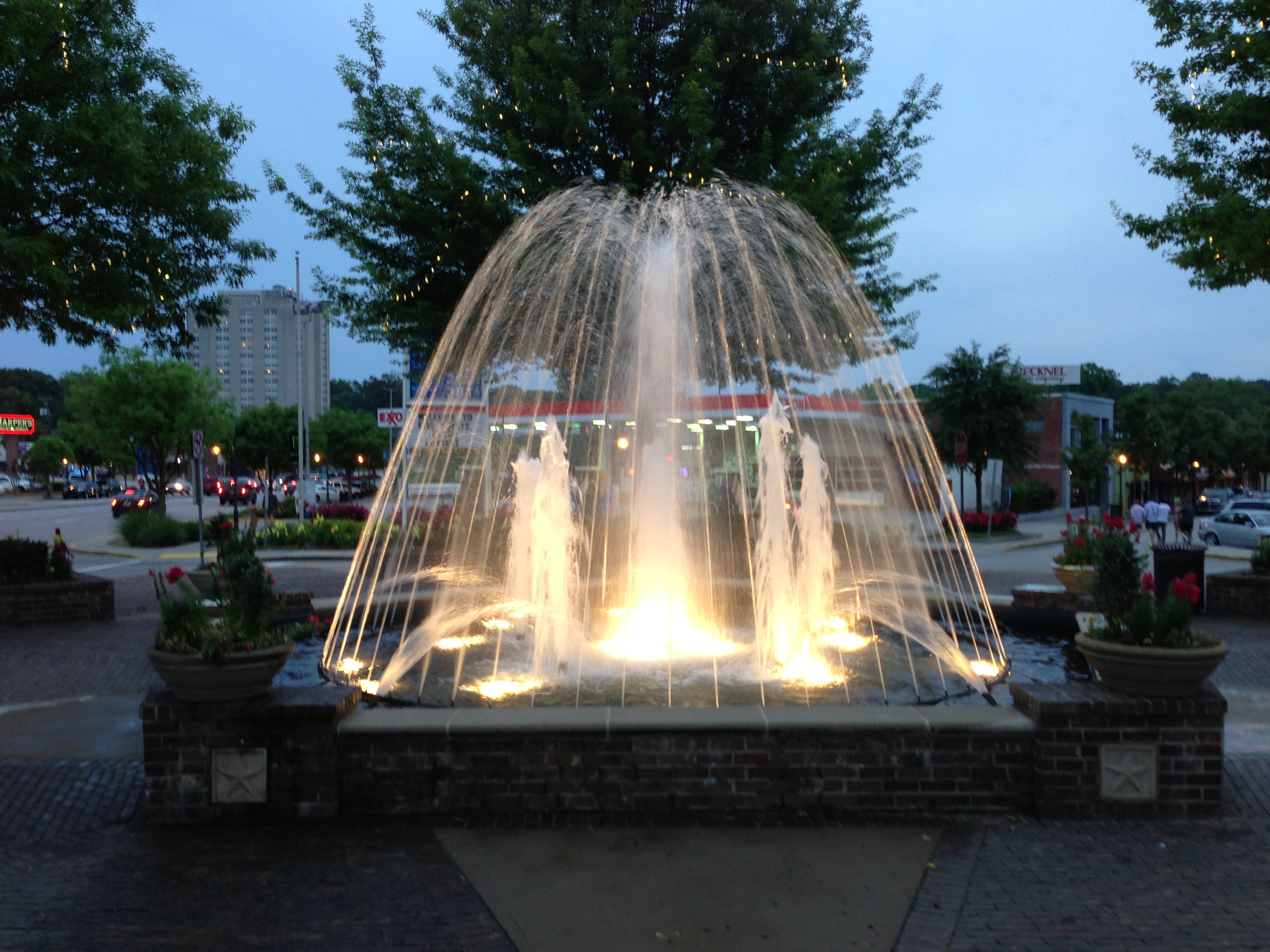
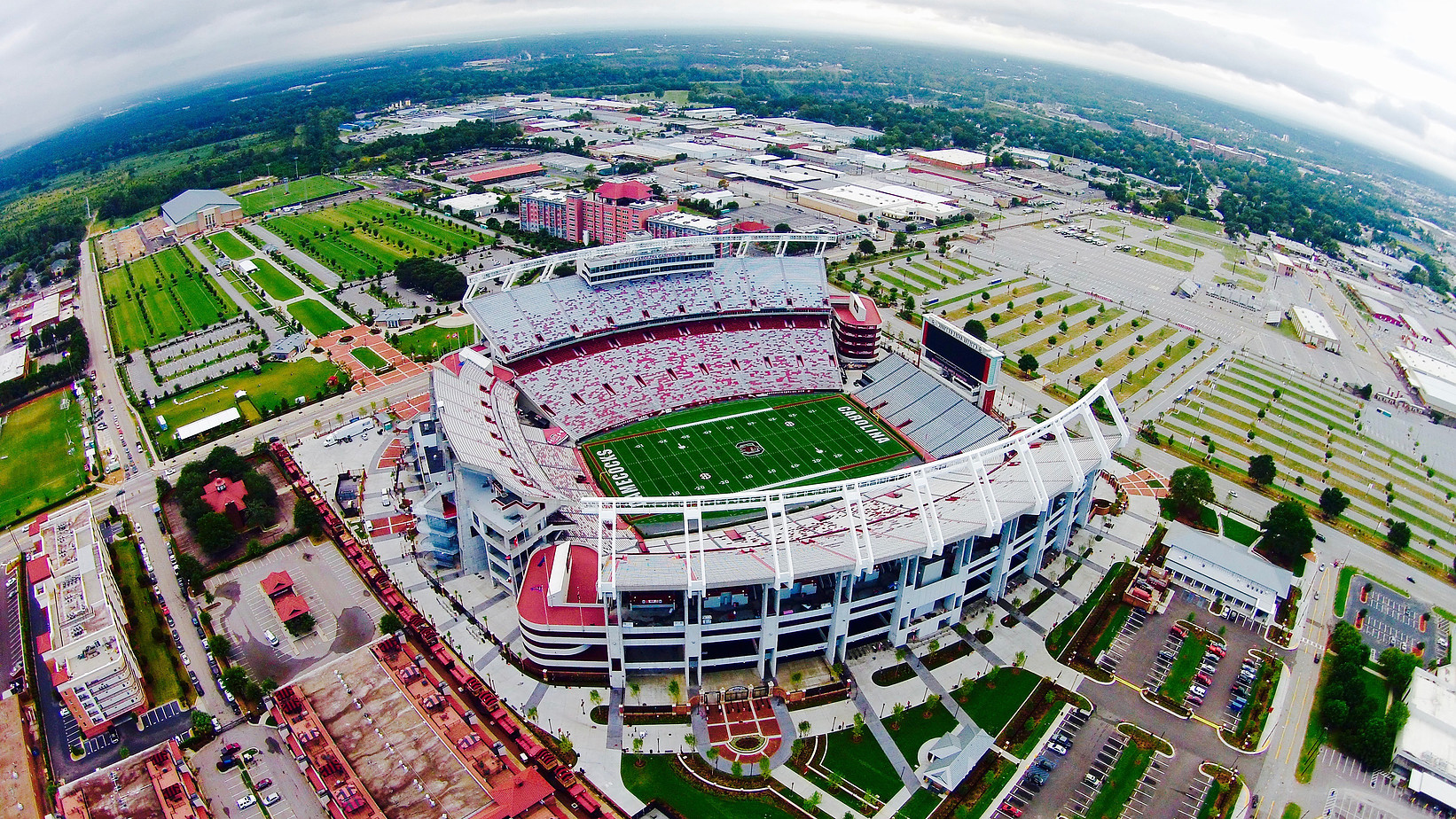
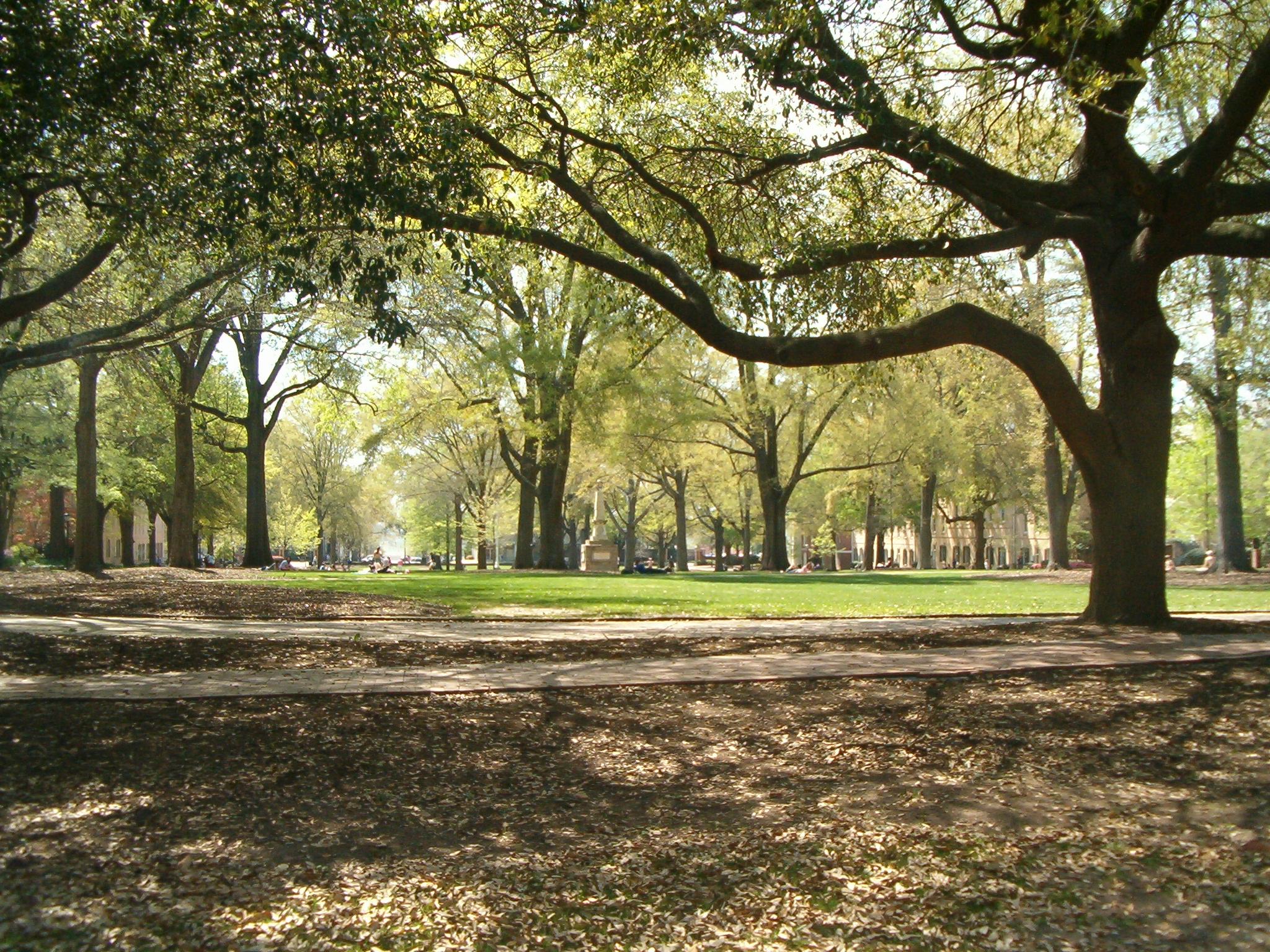
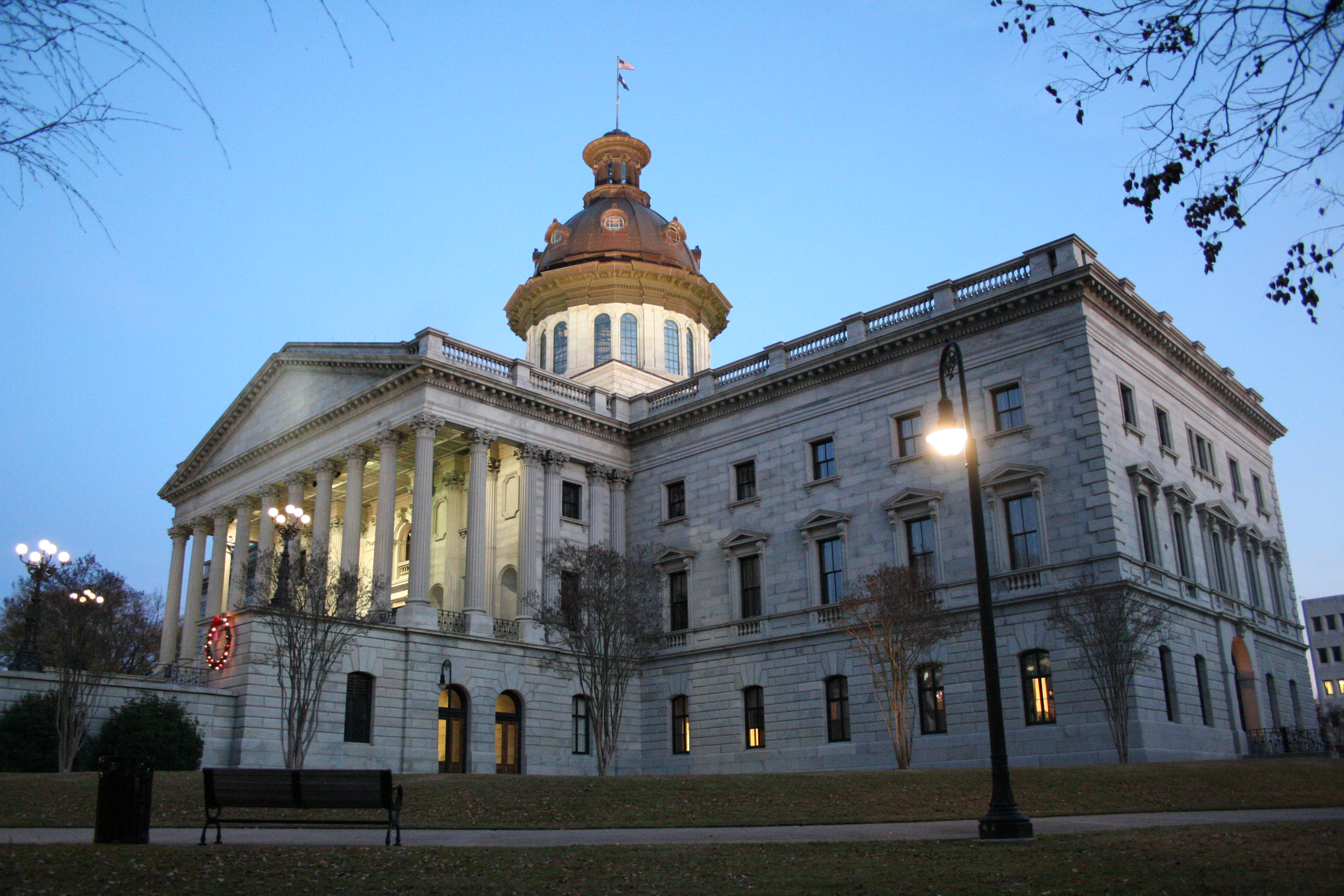
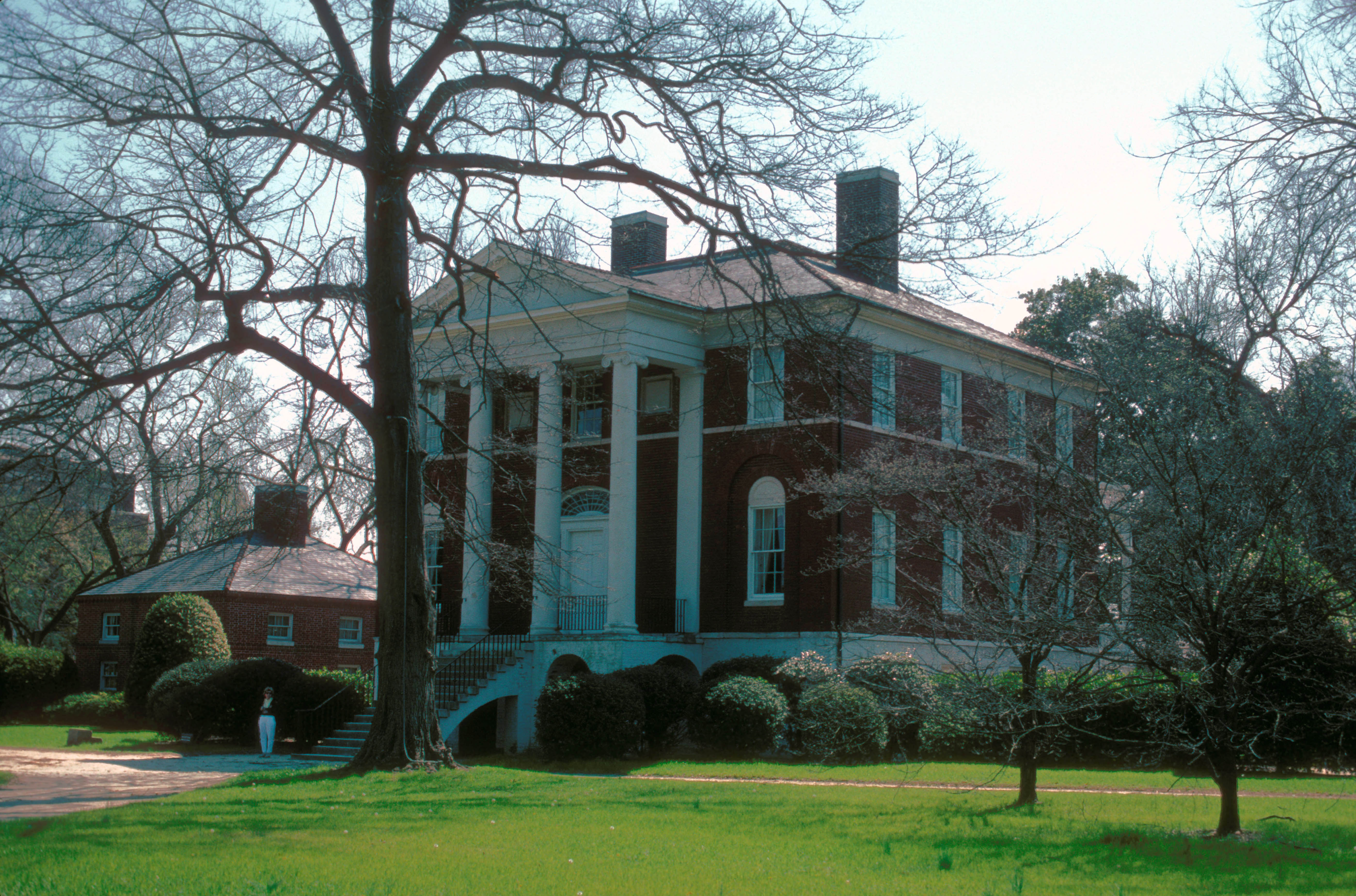
- Downtown Columbia Seibels House Five Points Williams-Brice Stadium University of South Carolina South Carolina State House Robert Mills House

- Flag Seal
- Nicknames: Cola, Capital City, River City, Soda City
- Motto: "Justitia Virtutum Regina" (Latin) (Justice, the Queen of Virtues) "We Are Columbia"
- Interactive map of Columbia
- Location within South Carolina Location within the United States
- Coordinates: 34°0′2″N 81°2′5″W
- Country: United States
- State: South Carolina
- County: Richland, Lexington, Kershaw
- Approved: March 22, 1786; 240 years ago
- Chartered (town): 1805; 221 years ago
- Chartered (city): 1854; 172 years ago
- Named for: Columbia

Government
  - Mayor: Daniel Rickenmann (R)

Area
  - State capital city: 140.68 sq mi (364.37 km^{2})
  - Land: 137.81 sq mi (356.93 km^{2})
  - Water: 2.87 sq mi (7.44 km^{2}) 1.68%
- Elevation: 276 ft (84 m)

Population (2020)
  - State capital city: 136,632
  - Estimate (2024): 144,788
  - Rank: 205th in the United States; 2nd in South Carolina
  - Density: 991/sq mi (382.8/km^{2})
  - Urban: 590,407 (US: 74th)
  - Urban density: 1,607/sq mi (620.3/km^{2})
  - Metro: 858,302 (US: 70th)
- Demonym: Columbian
- Time zone: UTC−5 (EST)
  - Summer (DST): UTC−4 (EDT)
- ZIP code(s): 29201–29212, 29214–29230, 29240, 29250, 29260, 29290, 29292
- Area codes: 803, 839
- FIPS code: 45-16000
- GNIS feature ID: 2404107
- Website: columbiasc.gov

Columbia is the capital of the U.S. state of South Carolina. It is the second-most populous city in the state, with a population of 136,632 at the 2020 census and estimated at 147,035 in 2025. It is the principal city of the Columbia metropolitan area, the second-largest metropolitan area in South Carolina, with an estimated population of 879,918 in 2025. Columbia serves as the county seat of Richland County, while portions of the city extend into neighboring Lexington and Kershaw counties. The city's name derives from "Columbia", a historic poetic personification of the United States, and is commonly shortened to "Cola", inspiring the nickname "Soda City".

Located near the geographic center of South Carolina at the fall line, Columbia developed at the confluence of the Broad and Saluda rivers, which form the Congaree River. Established in 1786 as South Carolina's first planned capital city, it has served as the seat of state government for more than two centuries and is home to the South Carolina State House. During the American Civil War, much of the city was destroyed in the burning of Columbia in 1865 before being rebuilt during Reconstruction.

Columbia is home to the University of South Carolina, the state's flagship public university, and Fort Jackson, the U.S. Army's largest basic combat training installation. State government, higher education, healthcare, military activities, insurance, and manufacturing form the foundation of the regional economy, while recent decades have seen significant investment in the Congaree Vista, Main Street, and the BullStreet District.

The city is a major cultural center for South Carolina, with institutions including the South Carolina State Museum, Columbia Museum of Art, and Riverbanks Zoo & Garden. Columbia also serves as a regional center for collegiate athletics through the University of South Carolina and provides access to outdoor recreation along the Three Rivers Greenway, Congaree National Park, and Lake Murray.

== History ==
=== Early history ===
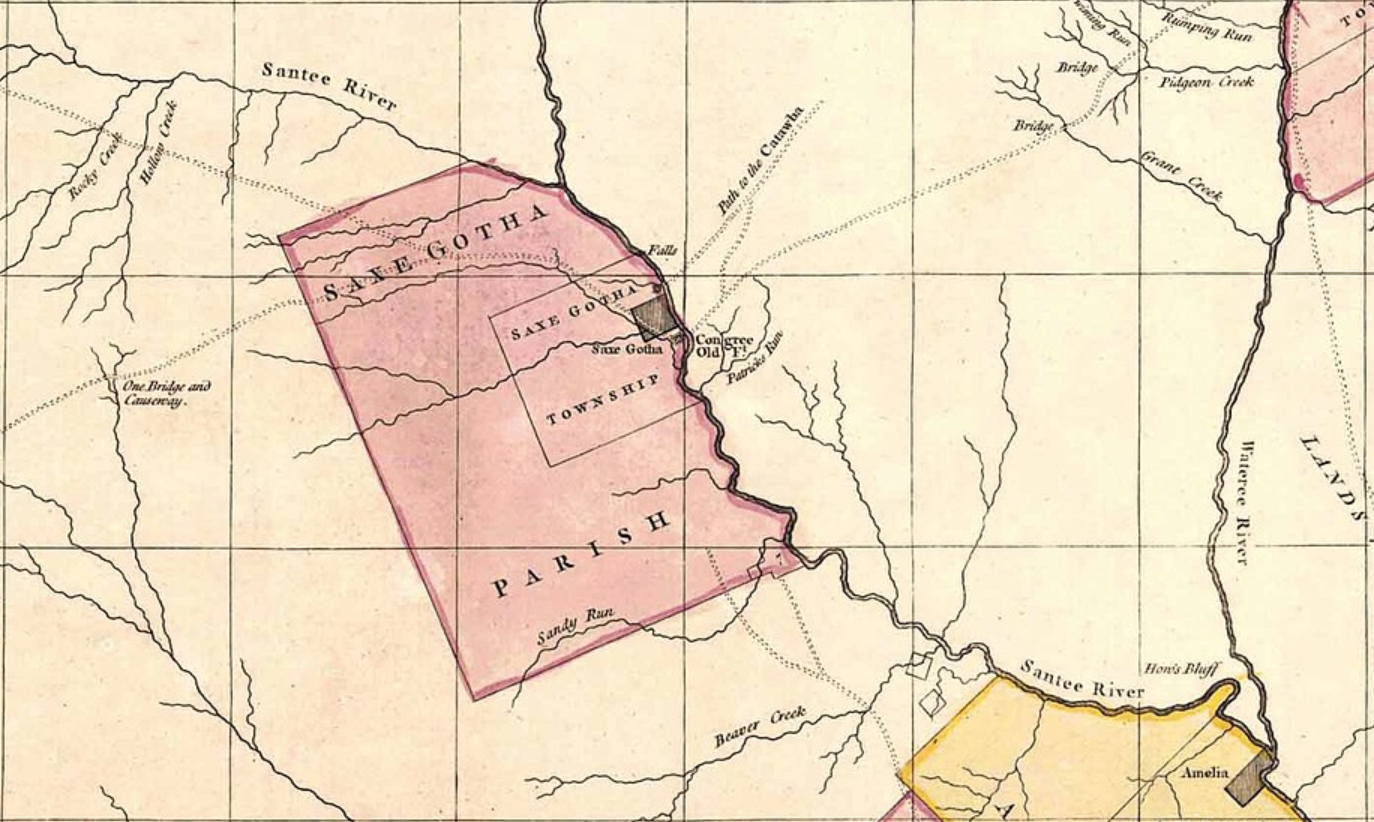
The future site of Columbia on a 1757 map showing Saxe Gotha Township and Old Congaree Fort.

In May 1540, a Spanish expedition led by Hernando de Soto traversed what is now Columbia while exploring the interior of the southeastern United States. The expedition produced the earliest surviving written account of the area, then part of the regional Cofitachequi chiefdom of the Mississippian culture.

During the colonial era, the Congaree inhabited several villages along the Congaree River, where the Broad and Saluda rivers converge to form the Congaree River. As English settlement expanded into the South Carolina backcountry during the eighteenth century, colonists established Congaree Fort on the river's west bank as a frontier outpost and trading post. In 1754, the colonial government of the Province of South Carolina established a ferry connecting the fort with the growing settlements on the east bank, encouraging further settlement in the surrounding area.

The settlement occupied a strategic location at the fall line, where rivers descending from the Piedmont become difficult to navigate farther upstream. As the head of navigation on the Santee River system and a natural crossing point between South Carolina's coastal and interior regions, the area developed into an important transportation and trading center long before the General Assembly selected the site for the new state capital in 1786.

=== Founding and early capital ===
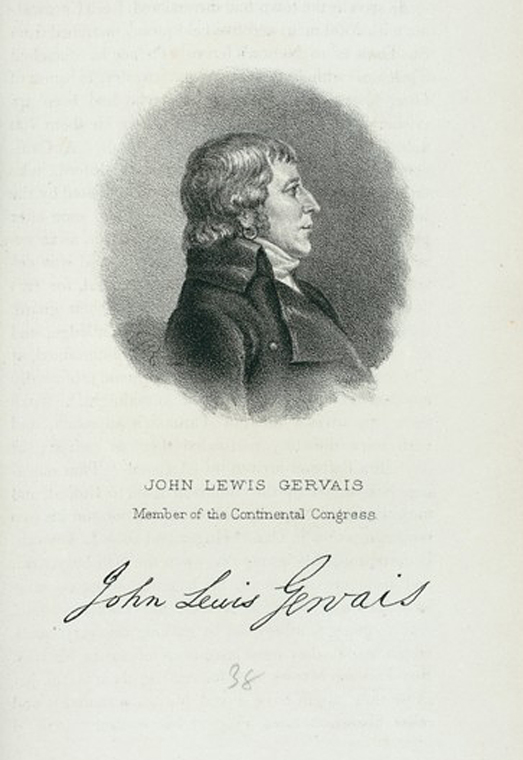
John Lewis Gervais.

Following the American Revolutionary War, South Carolina leaders sought a more centrally located capital than Charleston. State Senator John Lewis Gervais of Ninety Six introduced legislation establishing a new state capital, which was approved by the General Assembly on March 22, 1786. The site, known as Taylor's Hill, was selected for its central location within the state and its position along the Congaree River at the head of navigation on the Santee River system.

Surveyor John Guignard laid out Columbia as one of the first planned cities in the United States, five years before Pierre Charles L'Enfant's plan for Washington, D.C. The city was organized as a two-mile-square grid of 400 blocks with unusually broad streets and avenues. Assembly and Senate streets were each 150 feet (46 m) wide, while the remaining streets measured 100 feet (30 m). Blocks were divided into half-acre lots that were sold to prospective residents, with commissioners reserving prominent sites for public buildings, including the State House.

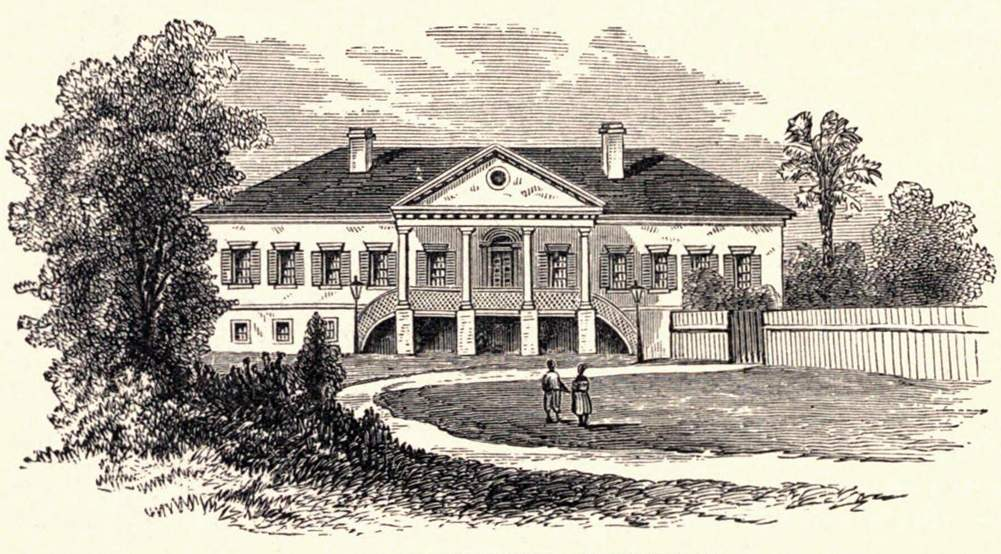
Depiction of the State House in Columbia during the Antebellum period.

Construction of Columbia's first State House began in 1786, and the General Assembly first met in the new capital in 1790. The city continued to expand its role as South Carolina's political and educational center with the founding of South Carolina College (now the University of South Carolina) in 1801. The college was intended to help unite the state's Upcountry and Lowcountry populations after the Revolution, and for many years its commencement exercises were held while the General Assembly was in session.

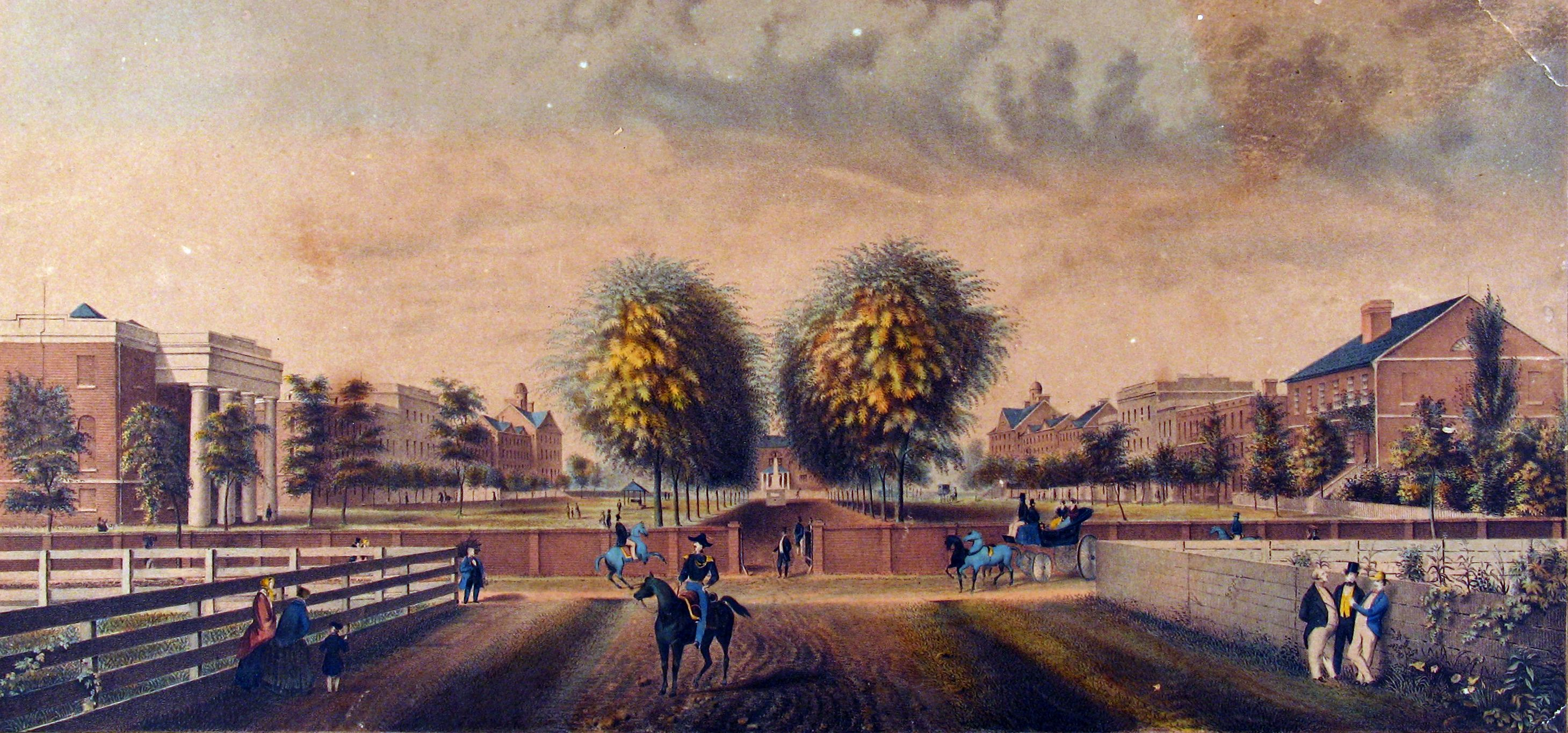
The Horseshoe of South Carolina College, c. 1850.

Transportation improvements accelerated Columbia's growth during the early nineteenth century. The Santee Canal, completed in 1800, established a direct inland water route to Charleston and was among the earliest canals constructed in the United States. By the 1840s, railroads had largely supplanted canal traffic, transforming Columbia into a transportation hub for central South Carolina and strengthening its commercial connections with regional and national markets.

Columbia was incorporated as a town in 1805, with John Taylor serving as its first elected intendant, and was chartered as a city in 1854. Throughout the antebellum period, Columbia grew steadily as a center of government, commerce, and education. Cotton became the city's principal commodity, with railroads carrying bales to Charleston for export to textile mills in the northeastern United States and Europe. Like much of South Carolina's economy, the city's prosperity depended upon enslaved labor. Around 1,500 enslaved people lived and worked in Columbia in 1830; by 1860 that number had grown to approximately 3,300. Enslaved laborers worked in households, businesses, government institutions, and South Carolina College, where many were hired out by their owners.

=== Civil War and Reconstruction ===
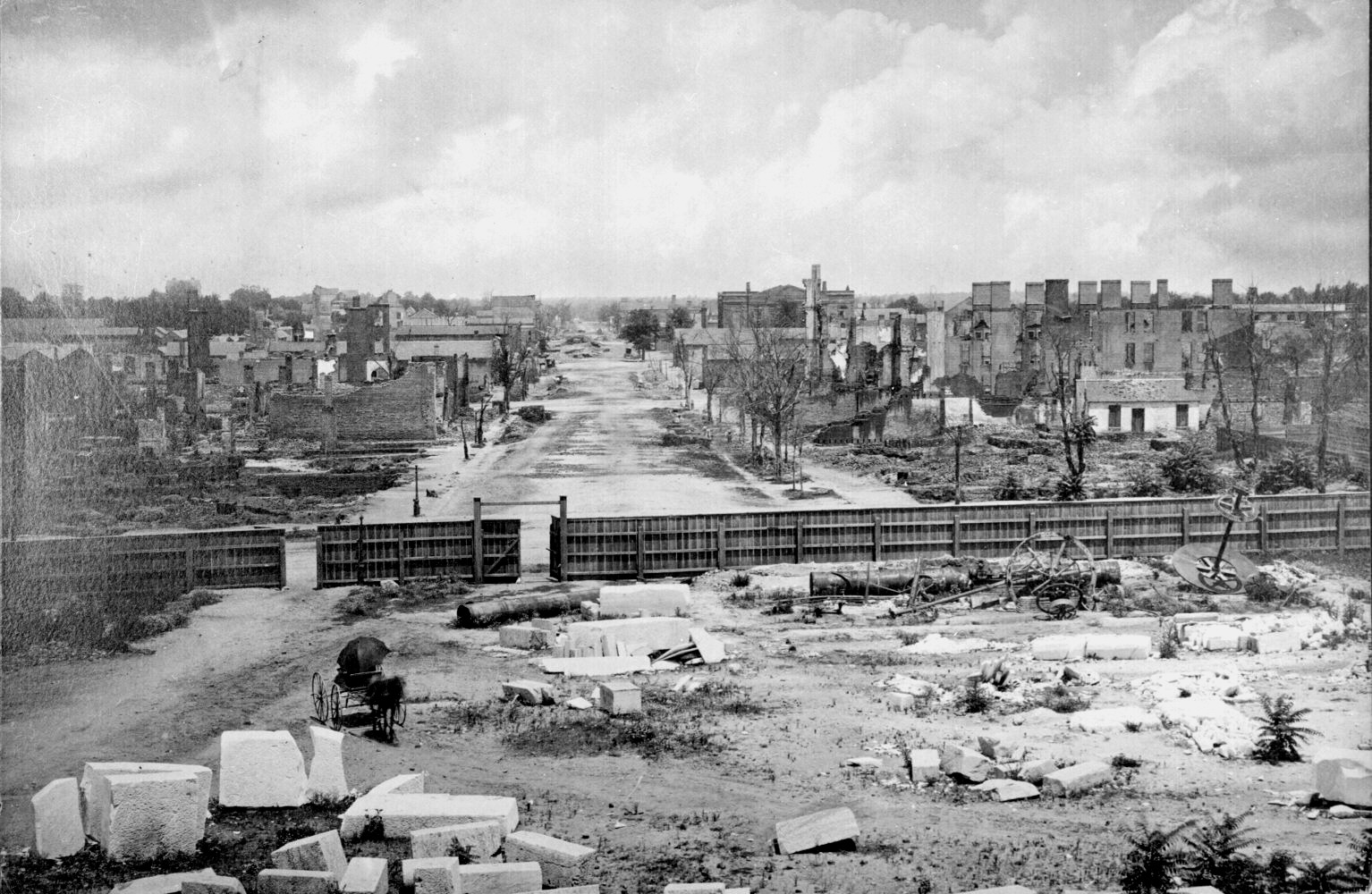
Columbia after the fire, 1865.

Columbia was of considerable importance to the Confederacy during the American Civil War as South Carolina's capital and a center of government, transportation, and military production. Columbia was the site of the first Southern secession convention, which assembled in the First Baptist Church on December 17, 1860. Secession may have been declared in Columbia, were it not for a smallpox outbreak that moved the convention to Charleston, where South Carolina became the first state to secede from the Union on December 20.

A considerable military infrastructure sprang up in Columbia during the war. The state arsenal was located in the city, along with the state military academy, while the University of South Carolina grounds were converted into a military hospital after nearly its entire student body volunteered for the Confederate Army. Numerous industrial facilities produced war materiel, and by 1865 Columbia had also become the Confederacy's last major breadbasket. These factors made it the next target for General William T. Sherman following his successful March to the Sea and capture of Savannah, Georgia.

The Union Army under Sherman captured Columbia on February 17, 1865. Much of the city was destroyed by fire between February 17 and 18. The idea that Sherman deliberately ordered the burning of Columbia has persisted as part of the Lost Cause of the Confederacy narrative; however, modern historians have concluded that no single cause led to the fire and that Sherman did not order the city burned. Rather, retreating Confederates, burning cotton bales, strong winds, and the chaotic conditions following the city's capture combined to create the conditions that allowed the fire to spread. As a newspaper columnist observed in 1874, "the war burned Columbia."

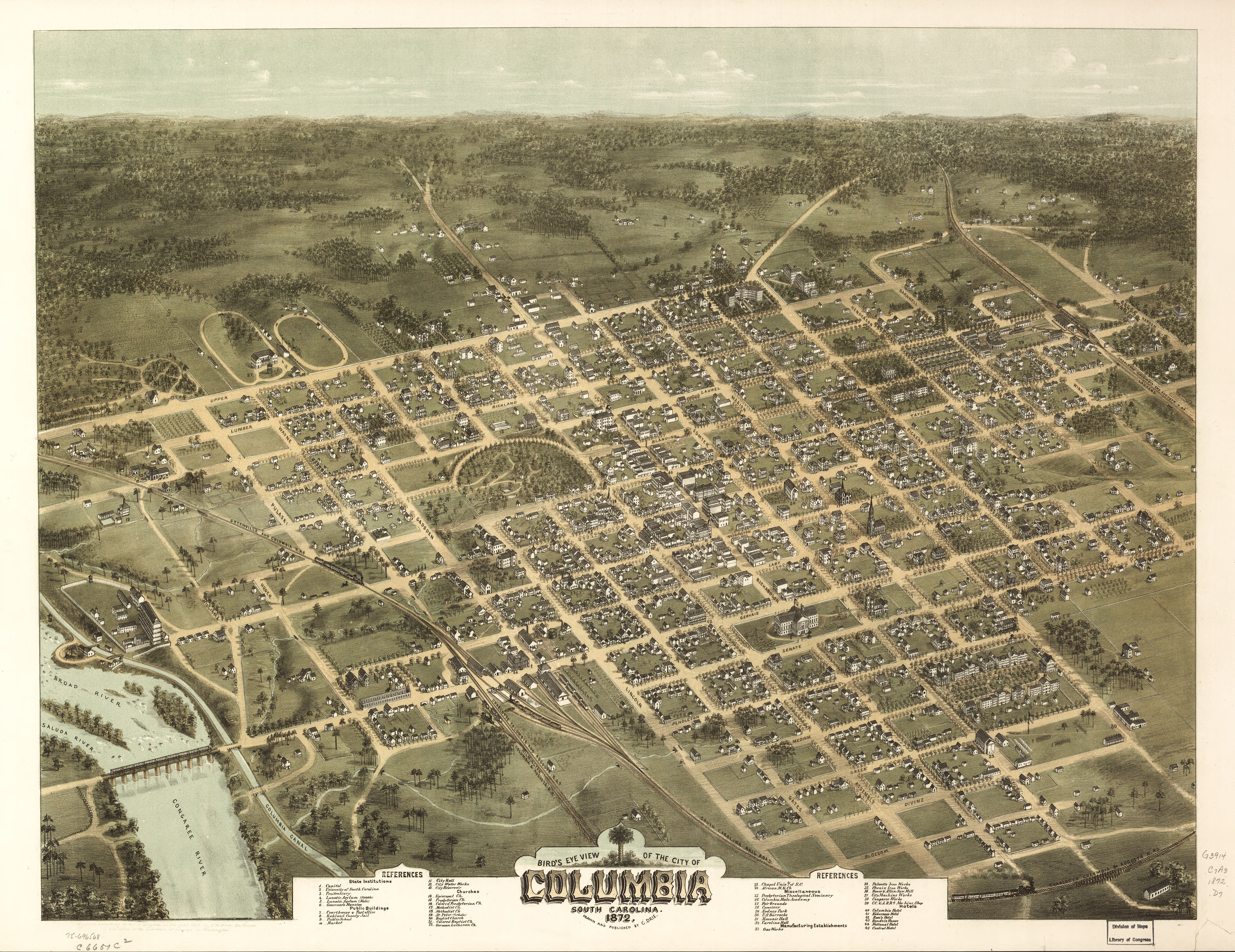
Bird's-eye view of Columbia, 1872.

During the Reconstruction era, Columbia became the center of South Carolina's Republican state government. Reporters, journalists, travelers, and tourists flocked to the city to observe a legislature whose members included formerly enslaved African Americans as well as free people of color. The city also began rebuilding from the destruction of 1865; a modest construction boom, together with the repair of railroads serving the city, restored Columbia's commercial district and laid the foundation for its late nineteenth-century industrial growth.

=== Industrialization and the Progressive Era ===
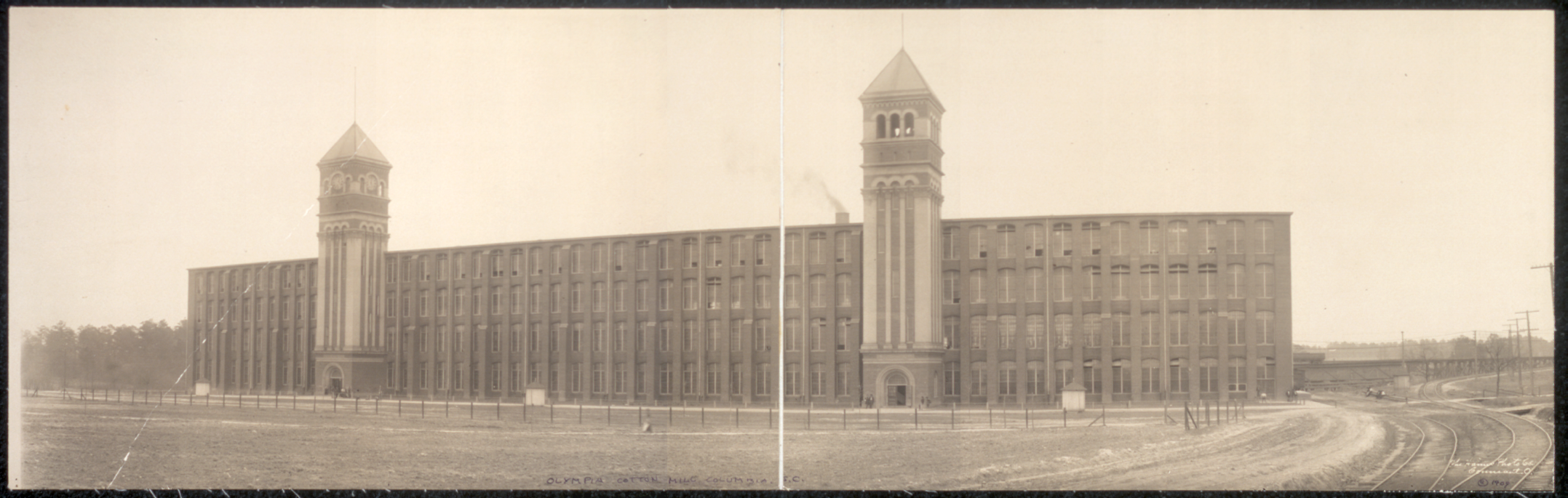
Olympia Mill in 1909

Following Reconstruction, Columbia emerged as the principal commercial and industrial center of the South Carolina Midlands. Completion of the Columbia Canal and expansion of the city's railroad network encouraged the rapid growth of textile manufacturing during the late nineteenth century. By the early twentieth century, mills including Richland, Granby, Olympia, Capital City, Columbia, and Palmetto employed thousands of workers and stimulated the development of surrounding mill villages. Railroads also transformed Columbia into one of the state's principal transportation hubs, linking the city with Charleston and other regional markets.

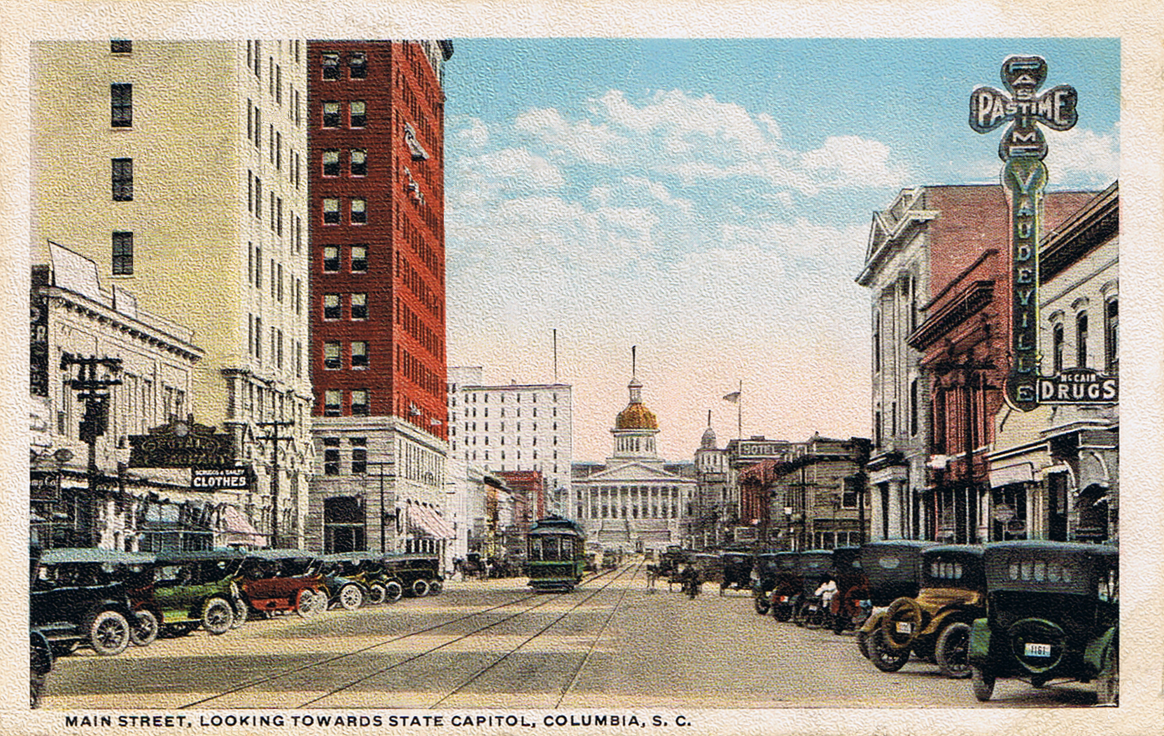
Main Street streetcars, c. 1920.

The city's growth reshaped its built environment. Electric streetcars, introduced in the 1890s, encouraged residential expansion beyond the original city limits while making downtown Columbia the region's commercial center. Civic leaders embraced the City Beautiful movement, commissioning an ambitious park and beautification plan in 1905, although only portions of the proposal were ultimately realized. Revenues generated by manufacturing and trade fueled a construction boom during the early twentieth century, transforming Main Street with new office buildings, hotels, banks, and department stores.

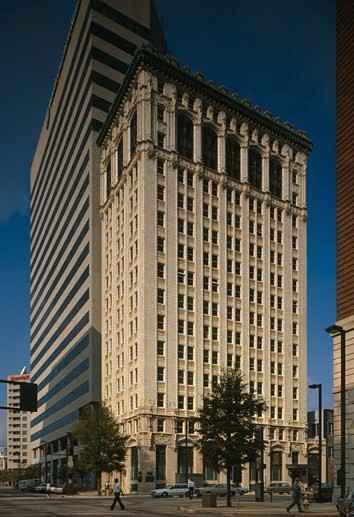
Palmetto Building, completed in 1913

Among the most prominent buildings of this period were the Palmetto Building, completed in 1913, and other early skyscrapers that came to define Columbia's skyline. The city also expanded its civic institutions, including hospitals, schools, and government buildings, reflecting its growing role as South Carolina's political, educational, and commercial center.

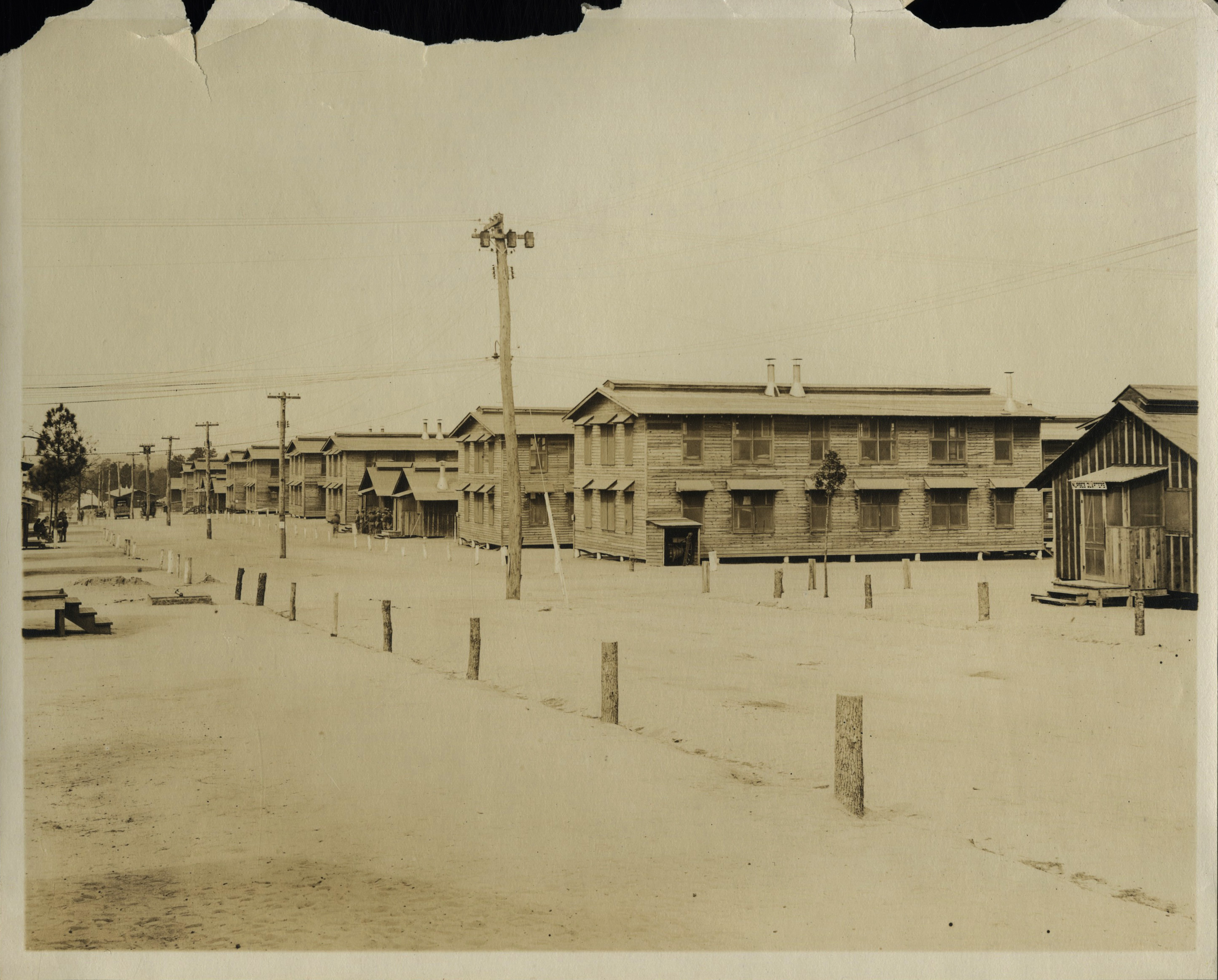
Camp Jackson in 1918.

Columbia's strategic location again proved significant during World War I when the U.S. Army established Camp Jackson in 1917 as a major training installation. The camp brought thousands of soldiers and civilians to the area and remained an important part of the local economy after its reactivation as Fort Jackson in 1940, shortly before the United States entered World War II. During the war, Lieutenant Colonel Jimmy Doolittle and his crews trained for the Doolittle Raid at what is now Columbia Metropolitan Airport.

=== Postwar transformation ===
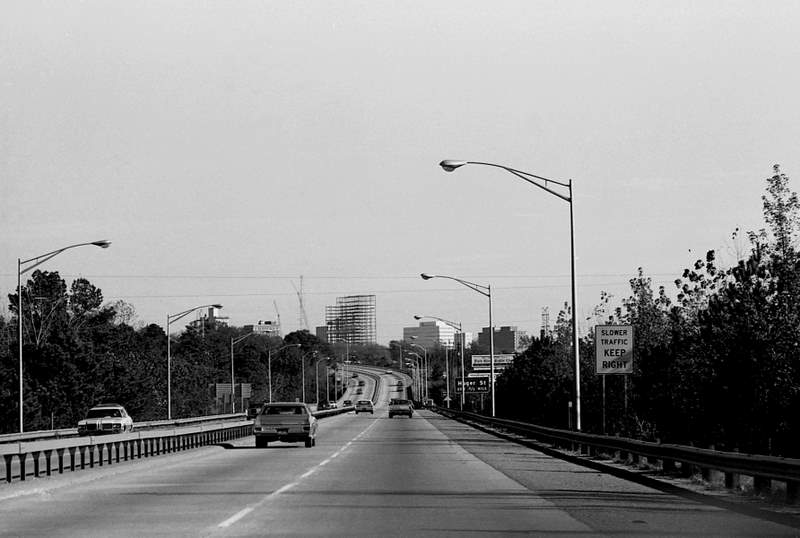
Looking downtown on I-126, c. 1975

Following World War II, Columbia experienced rapid suburban growth and significant changes to its built environment. New residential neighborhoods, commercial centers, and highways shifted development away from the historic downtown, while urban renewal projects replaced many older commercial and residential buildings with modern office complexes, government facilities, parking structures, and widened streets. Modernist architecture became increasingly prominent throughout the city, particularly around the University of South Carolina, the State House complex, and the central business district.

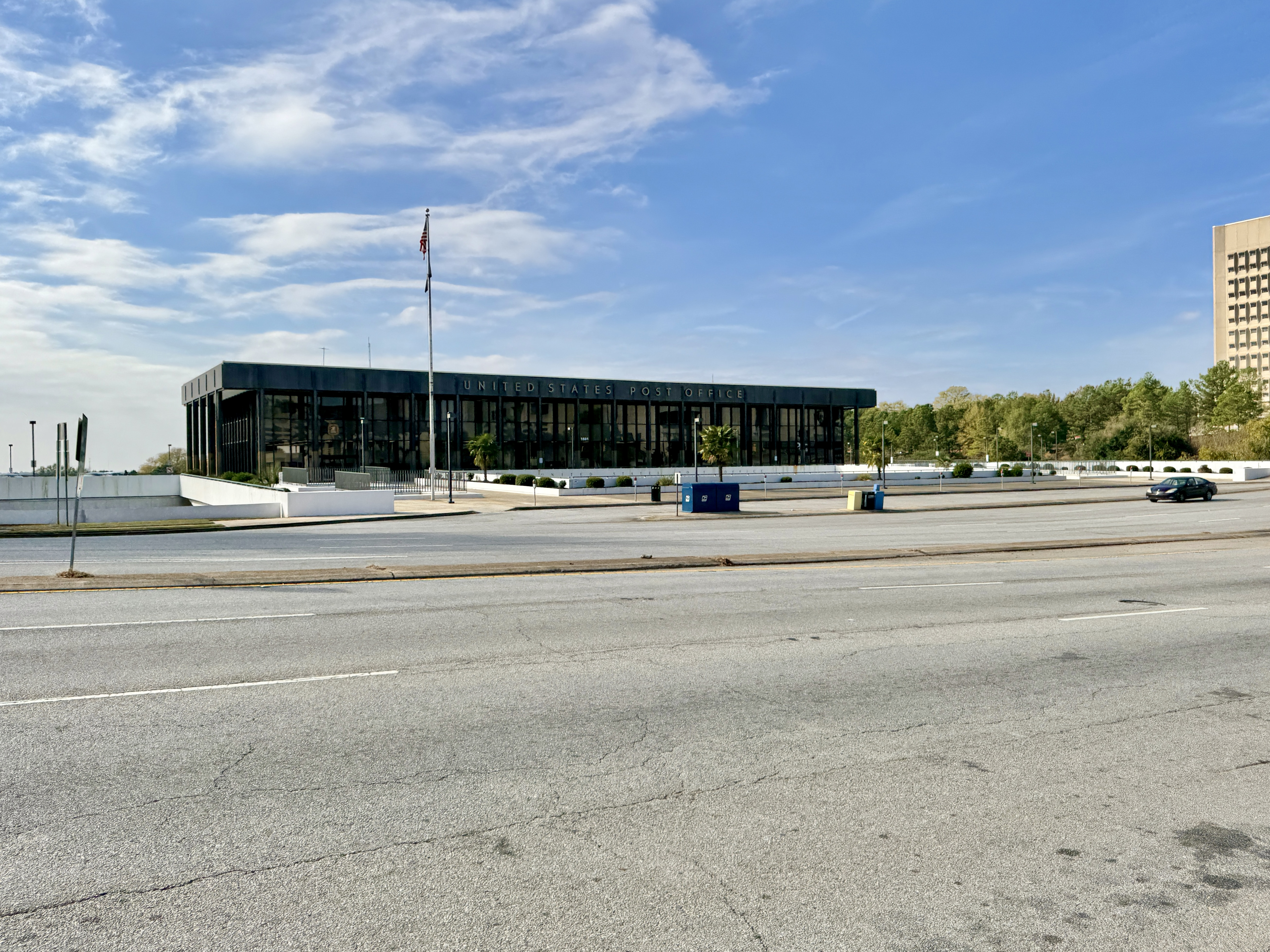
Columbia's main post office, built in 1966 in the International style.

The postwar period also brought major advances in the Civil rights movement. During the 1940s African Americans increased activism for their civil rights, seeking to reverse Jim Crow laws and racial discrimination that relegated them to second-class status. In 1945, a federal judge ruled that Columbia's Black public school teachers were entitled to equal pay with their white counterparts. Following the U.S. Supreme Court's decision in Brown v. Board of Education (1954), segregation gradually ended in the city's public institutions. On August 21, 1962, eight downtown chain stores served Black customers at their lunch counters for the first time, and the University of South Carolina admitted its first Black students the following year. Around the same time, African Americans gained membership on municipal boards and commissions, and the city adopted nondiscriminatory hiring policies. These developments helped earn Columbia its second All-America City Award in 1964 (the first came in 1951). A 1965 article in Newsweek described Columbia as having "liberated itself from the plague of doctrinal apartheid".

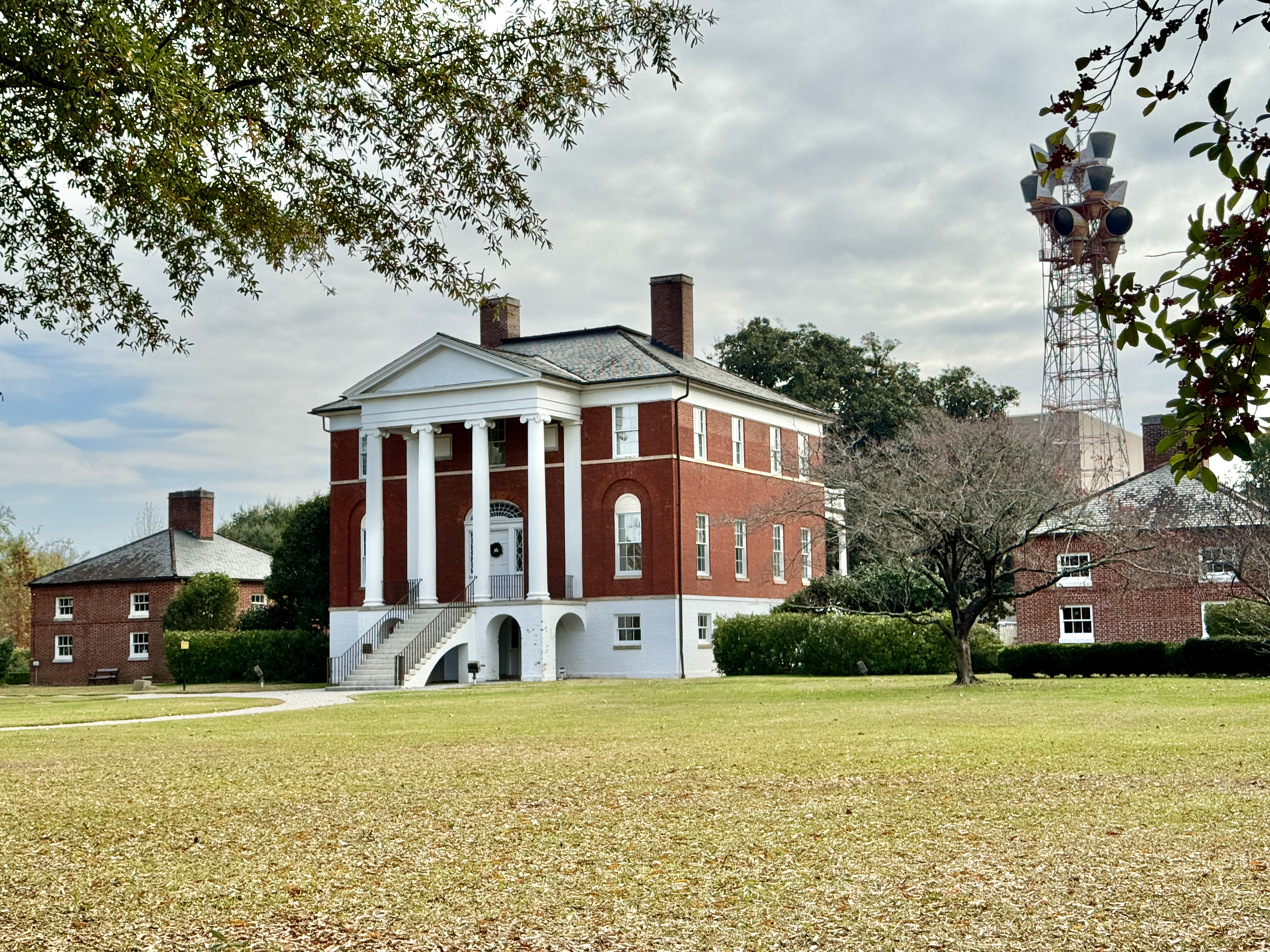
Robert Mills House.

The construction of Interstate 26, Interstate 20, and Interstate 77, together with continued suburban expansion, reinforced Columbia's role as the Midlands' transportation hub while accelerating the decentralization of commerce and population from the historic downtown.

Beginning in the late 1960s, historic preservation became an important civic priority. The restoration of the Robert Mills House in 1967 inspired the preservation of other historic landmarks, including the Hampton-Preston House, the Woodrow Wilson Boyhood Home, and the Mann–Simons Site. During the early 1970s, the University of South Carolina restored the Horseshoe, while institutions including the South Carolina State Museum, which opened in 1988, reflected a growing public interest in preserving and interpreting Columbia's history.

=== Downtown revitalization and the twenty-first century ===
Beginning in the 1980s, Columbia undertook major efforts to reverse decades of suburbanization and revitalize its downtown. Under Mayor Kirkman Finlay Jr., Seaboard Park was redeveloped as Finlay Park, while the $60 million Palmetto Center project introduced new office space, parking facilities, and the Columbia Marriott hotel. New high-rise construction, including Tower at 1301 Gervais (1973), Hub at Columbia (1983), Capitol Center (1987), and Bank of America Plaza (1989), reshaped the city's skyline and marked the beginning of a broader period of downtown reinvestment.

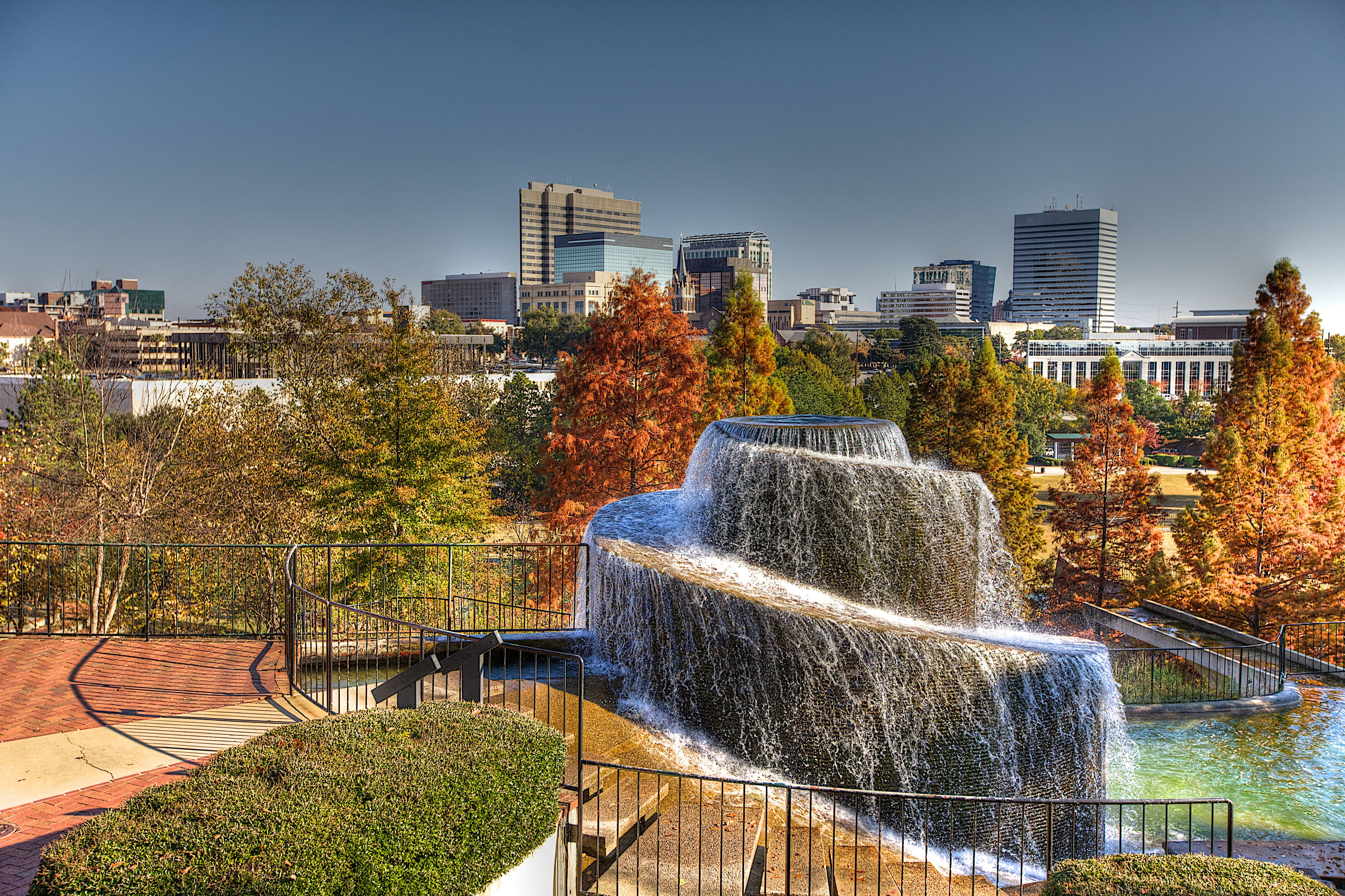
Finlay Park

During the 1990s and early 2000s, redevelopment accelerated as the former warehouse district along Gervais Street was transformed into the Congaree Vista, now a center of restaurants, galleries, shops, entertainment, and residential development. New civic projects—including the Colonial Life Arena (2002), EdVenture children's museum (2003), and the Columbia Metropolitan Convention Center (2004)—reinforced downtown as the cultural and convention center of the Midlands. The City Center Partnership, formed to coordinate public and private investment, further encouraged downtown growth, while the completion of the Tower at Main and Gervais in 2009 added the city's first new skyscraper in two decades.

Investment also expanded toward the Congaree River through improvements to Riverfront Park, expansion of trails and public spaces, and continued redevelopment of former industrial areas. Together with the revitalization of the Vista, these projects helped reconnect downtown with the river and encouraged new residential, commercial, and recreational development.

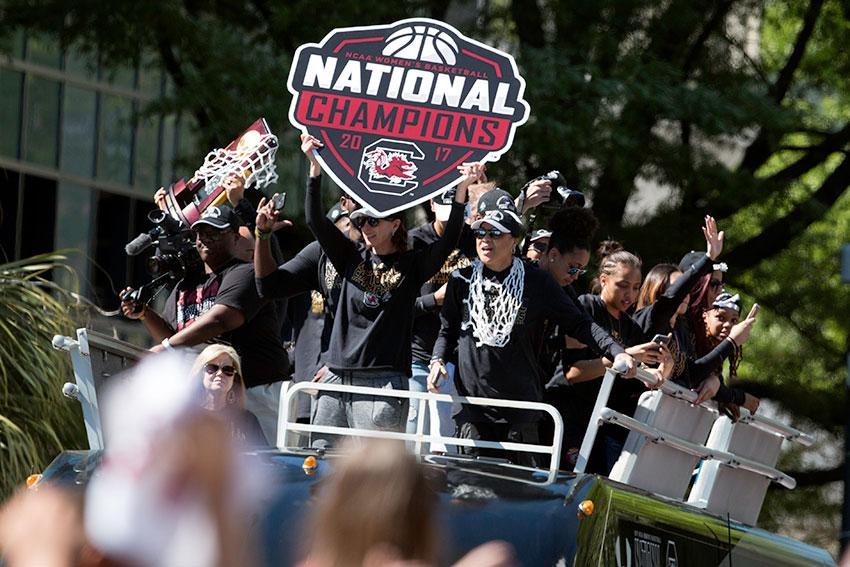
Gamecocks women's basketball championship parade, 2017

The University of South Carolina remained a major driver of Columbia's identity and economy during the early twenty-first century. Founders Park opened in 2009, while the South Carolina Gamecocks baseball team won consecutive NCAA national championships in 2010 and 2011. Under coach Dawn Staley, the South Carolina Gamecocks women's basketball team won NCAA national championships in 2017, 2022, and 2024, further raising the city's national profile.

In 2010, Stephen K. Benjamin became Columbia's first African American mayor, serving until 2022. Historic flooding in October 2015 caused widespread damage throughout the Columbia metropolitan area and disrupted the University of South Carolina, forcing the Gamecocks football team to relocate a home game. That same year, the Confederate battle flag was permanently removed from the South Carolina State House grounds following the Charleston church shooting.

== Geography ==
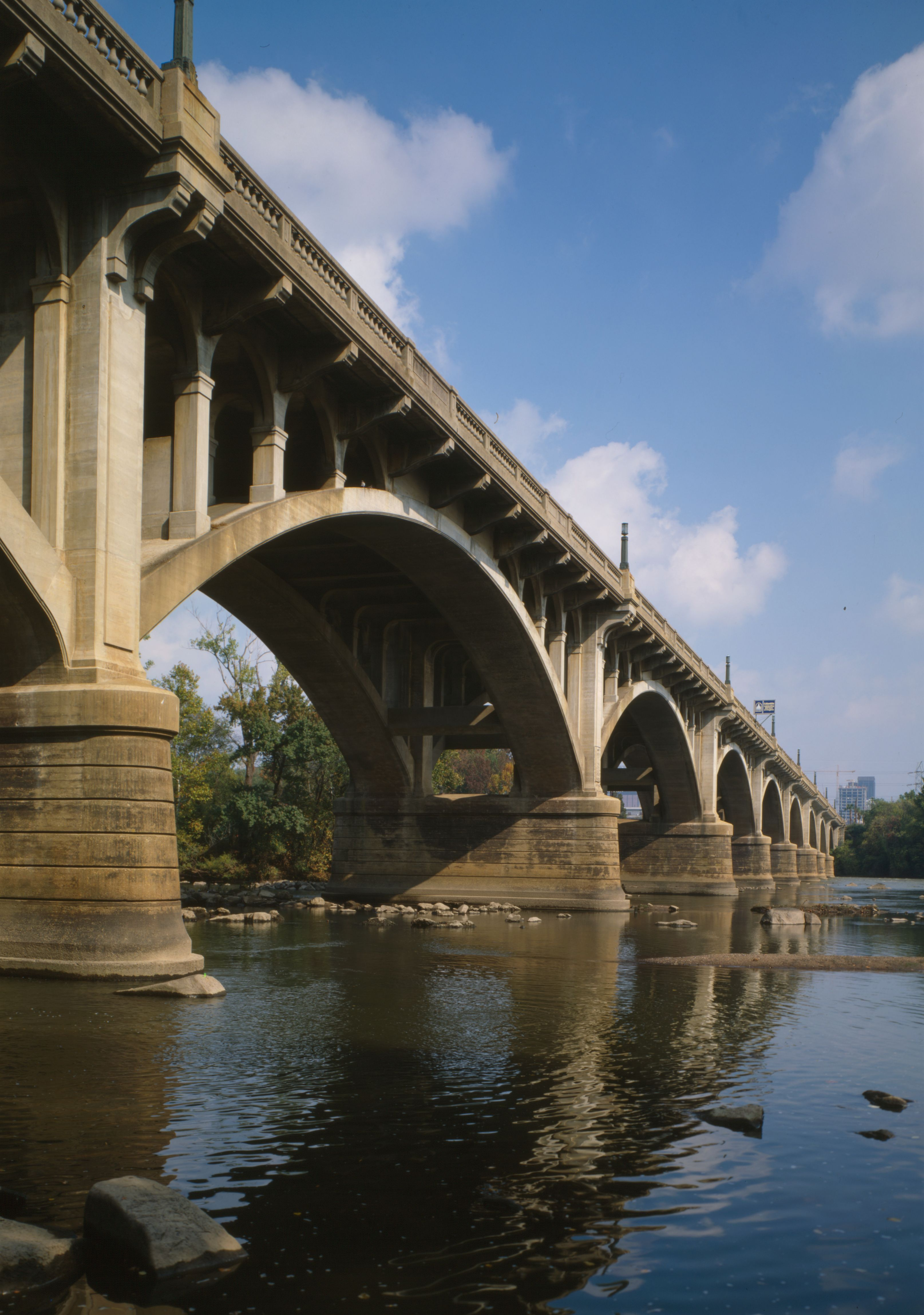
The Gervais Street Bridge over the Congaree River.

Columbia is located near the geographic center of South Carolina at the fall line, where the Piedmont meets the Atlantic Coastal Plain. The city developed at the confluence of the Broad and Saluda rivers, which join to form the Congaree River, and lies roughly halfway between the Atlantic Ocean and the Blue Ridge Mountains.

Columbia's position at the head of navigation on the Congaree River contributed to its selection as South Carolina's state capital in 1786 and later supported its growth as a transportation, industrial, and commercial center. Today, the Broad, Saluda, and Congaree rivers remain defining features of the city's landscape, supporting parks, trails, and recreational opportunities.

According to the United States Census Bureau, the city has a total area of 140.68 square miles (364.4 km^{2}), of which 137.81 square miles (356.9 km^{2}) is land and 2.87 square miles (7.4 km^{2}) (1.68%) is water. Approximately two-thirds of Columbia's land area, 81.2 square miles (210 km^{2}), lies within Fort Jackson, much of which consists of undeveloped military training grounds.

=== Climate ===
Columbia has a humid subtropical climate (Köppen Cfa), characterized by hot, humid summers and generally mild winters. Owing to its inland location, relatively low elevation, sandy soils, and urban heat island effect, the city frequently records some of the highest summer temperatures in South Carolina.

Annual precipitation averages about 45 inches (1,100 mm), with rainfall occurring throughout the year but peaking during the summer because of frequent afternoon thunderstorms. Snowfall is infrequent, averaging about 1.2 inches (3.0 cm) annually. The highest temperature ever recorded in the city was 113 °F (45 °C), measured at the University of South Carolina on June 29, 2012, while the official record low is −2 °F (−19 °C), set on February 14, 1899.

Climate data for Columbia, South Carolina (Columbia Airport), 1991–2020 normals, (Note: Mean monthly maxima and minima (i.e. the expected highest and lowest temperature readings at any point during the year or given month) calculated based on data at said location from 1991 to 2020.) extremes 1887–present (Note: Official records for Columbia were kept at downtown from June 1887 to December 1947, and at Columbia Airport since January 1948. For more information, see Threadex)
Month	Jan	Feb	Mar	Apr	May	Jun	Jul	Aug	Sep	Oct	Nov	Dec	Year
Record high °F (°C)	84 (29)	84 (29)	93 (34)	96 (36)	101 (38)	113 (45)	107 (42)	107 (42)	106 (41)	101 (38)	90 (32)	83 (28)	113 (45)
Mean maximum °F (°C)	74.5 (23.6)	78.0 (25.6)	84.1 (28.9)	89.0 (31.7)	94.4 (34.7)	98.3 (36.8)	100.1 (37.8)	99.1 (37.3)	95.2 (35.1)	88.6 (31.4)	80.9 (27.2)	75.8 (24.3)	101.5 (38.6)
Mean daily maximum °F (°C)	56.8 (13.8)	60.8 (16.0)	68.3 (20.2)	76.7 (24.8)	83.8 (28.8)	89.7 (32.1)	92.7 (33.7)	90.8 (32.7)	85.7 (29.8)	76.5 (24.7)	66.4 (19.1)	58.9 (14.9)	75.6 (24.2)
Daily mean °F (°C)	45.7 (7.6)	49.1 (9.5)	55.9 (13.3)	64.1 (17.8)	72.2 (22.3)	79.1 (26.2)	82.4 (28.0)	81.0 (27.2)	75.5 (24.2)	64.6 (18.1)	54.0 (12.2)	47.7 (8.7)	64.3 (17.9)
Mean daily minimum °F (°C)	34.6 (1.4)	37.3 (2.9)	43.6 (6.4)	51.5 (10.8)	60.5 (15.8)	68.6 (20.3)	72.0 (22.2)	71.2 (21.8)	65.3 (18.5)	52.7 (11.5)	41.6 (5.3)	36.5 (2.5)	53.0 (11.7)
Mean minimum °F (°C)	18.3 (−7.6)	22.2 (−5.4)	26.4 (−3.1)	34.8 (1.6)	46.2 (7.9)	58.9 (14.9)	65.4 (18.6)	62.5 (16.9)	51.7 (10.9)	35.8 (2.1)	26.3 (−3.2)	21.7 (−5.7)	16.7 (−8.5)
Record low °F (°C)	−1 (−18)	−2 (−19)	4 (−16)	26 (−3)	34 (1)	44 (7)	54 (12)	53 (12)	40 (4)	23 (−5)	12 (−11)	4 (−16)	−2 (−19)
Average precipitation inches (mm)	3.49 (89)	3.39 (86)	3.57 (91)	2.83 (72)	3.49 (89)	4.97 (126)	5.35 (136)	4.65 (118)	3.91 (99)	3.13 (80)	2.76 (70)	3.70 (94)	45.24 (1,149)
Average snowfall inches (cm)	0.6 (1.5)	0.4 (1.0)	0.1 (0.25)	0.0 (0.0)	0.0 (0.0)	0.0 (0.0)	0.0 (0.0)	0.0 (0.0)	0.0 (0.0)	0.0 (0.0)	0.0 (0.0)	0.1 (0.25)	1.2 (3.0)
Average precipitation days (≥ 0.01 in)	9.6	8.9	8.9	8.1	8.5	11.0	11.8	10.4	8.0	6.9	7.3	9.2	108.6
Average snowy days (≥ 0.1 in)	0.4	0.2	0.1	0.0	0.0	0.0	0.0	0.0	0.0	0.0	0.0	0.1	0.8
Average relative humidity (%)	69.2	65.8	64.6	62.1	68.2	70.8	73.4	76.5	75.9	73.0	71.6	70.7	70.2
Mean monthly sunshine hours	172.7	180.7	237.3	269.6	292.9	280.0	286.0	263.3	239.8	235.0	193.8	175.0	2,826.1
Percentage possible sunshine	55	59	64	69	68	65	65	63	64	67	62	57	64
Source: NOAA (relative humidity and sun 1961−1990)

=== Metropolitan area ===
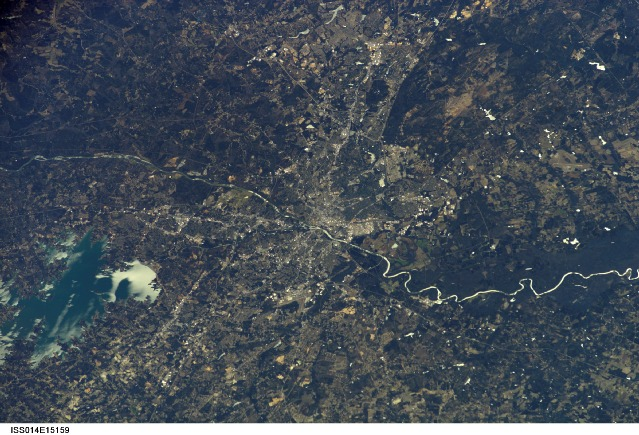
Columbia from the International Space Station

Columbia is the principal city of the Columbia metropolitan area, the second-most populous metropolitan statistical area (MSA) in South Carolina after Greenville. Defined by the U.S. Office of Management and Budget, the Columbia MSA encompasses six counties—Calhoun, Fairfield, Kershaw, Lexington, Richland, and Saluda—and had an estimated population of 879,918 in 2025.

Although the city itself had an estimated population of 147,035 in 2025, Columbia's continuously developed urban area extends beyond its municipal boundaries into neighboring communities including Cayce, West Columbia, Forest Acres, and Lexington. At the 2020 United States census, the urban area had a population of 603,681.

Columbia also anchors the Columbia–Sumter–Orangeburg combined statistical area (CSA), which includes adjacent metropolitan and micropolitan areas linked through commuting and economic ties. The CSA had an estimated population of 1,107,723 in 2025.

=== Neighborhoods ===
Elmwood Park

Columbia contains numerous neighborhoods and historic districts that reflect its growth from the late eighteenth century through the present. Among the best known are Arsenal Hill, Congaree Vista, Cottontown/Bellevue Historic District, Elmwood Park, Five Points, Granby Mill Village, Old Shandon, Rosewood, University Hill, and the Waverly Historic District.

== Demographics ==
Historical population
Census	Pop.	Note	%±
1830	3,310		—
1840	4,340		31.1%
1850	6,060		39.6%
1860	9,052		49.4%
1870	9,298		2.7%
1880	10,036		7.9%
1890	15,353		53.0%
1900	21,108		37.5%
1910	26,319		24.7%
1920	37,524		42.6%
1930	51,581		37.5%
1940	62,396		21.0%
1950	86,914		39.3%
1960	97,433		12.1%
1970	113,542		16.5%
1980	101,208		−10.9%
1990	98,052		−3.1%
2000	116,278		18.6%
2010	129,272		11.2%
2020	136,632		5.7%
2025 (est.)	147,035		7.6%
U.S. Decennial Census

=== Population ===
As of the 2020 United States census, Columbia had a population of 136,632, making it the second-most populous city in South Carolina after Charleston. The city contained 53,522 households, including 22,243 families. The median age was 29.9 years, reflecting the influence of the University of South Carolina and several other colleges and universities located in the city. Approximately 17.1% of residents were under the age of 18, while 12.1% were 65 years of age or older.

Columbia has historically been one of South Carolina's most diverse cities. According to the 2020 census, non-Hispanic White residents comprised 49.2% of the population and non-Hispanic Black residents 38.1%, while Hispanic or Latino residents accounted for 5.9%. Asian residents represented just over 3% of the city's population, continuing a trend toward increasing racial and ethnic diversity during the early twenty-first century.

=== Religion ===
Columbia is the seat of the Episcopal Diocese of Upper South Carolina, whose cathedral is Trinity Episcopal Cathedral. The city is also home to the Basilica of Saint Peter, South Carolina's only minor basilica.

The city has numerous Protestant congregations representing a variety of denominations, as well as Jewish synagogues, Islamic mosques, Greek Orthodox churches, Hindu temples, and other religious communities. The Columbia South Carolina Temple, located in nearby Hopkins, serves members of the Church of Jesus Christ of Latter-day Saints throughout South Carolina and portions of neighboring states.

=== Racial and ethnic composition ===
Columbia city, South Carolina – Racial and ethnic composition Note: the US Census treats Hispanic/Latino as an ethnic category. This table excludes Latinos from the racial categories and assigns them to a separate category. Hispanics/Latinos may be of any race.
Race / Ethnicity (NH = Non-Hispanic)	Pop 2000	Pop 2010	Pop 2020	% 2000	% 2010	% 2020
White alone (NH)	55,993	64,062	67,238	48.15%	49.56%	49.21%
Black or African American alone (NH)	53,052	53,948	52,038	45.63%	41.73%	38.09%
Native American or Alaska Native alone (NH)	260	363	301	0.22%	0.28%	0.22%
Asian alone (NH)	1,977	2,846	4,152	1.70%	2.20%	3.04%
Native Hawaiian or Pacific Islander alone (NH)	87	150	113	0.07%	0.12%	0.08%
Other race alone (NH)	140	162	409	0.12%	0.13%	0.30%
Mixed race or Multiracial (NH)	1,249	2,119	4,278	1.07%	1.64%	3.13%
Hispanic or Latino (any race)	3,520	5,622	8,103	3.03%	4.35%	5.93%
Total	116,278	129,272	136,632	100.00%	100.00%	100.00%

== Economy ==
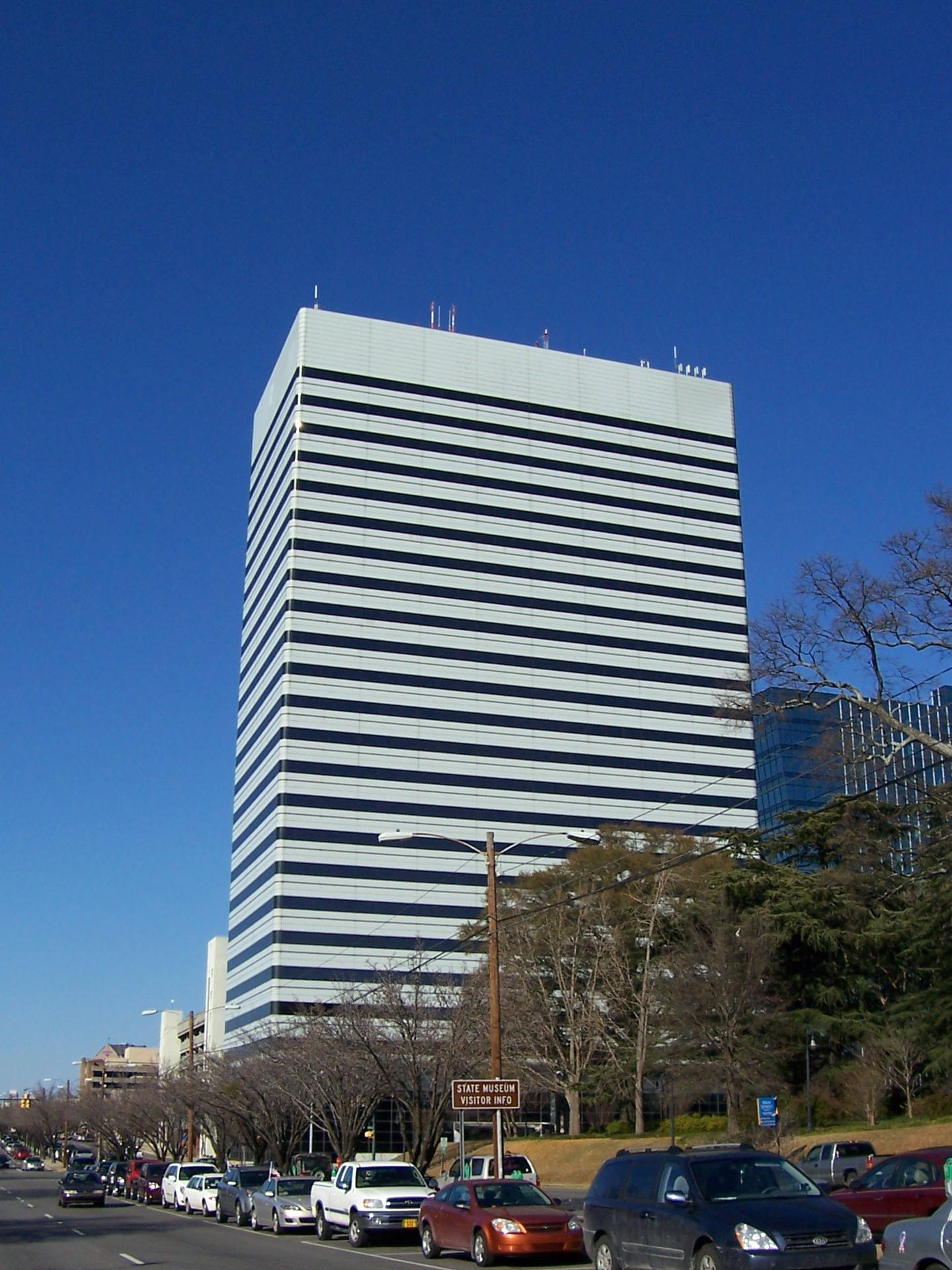
The Capitol Center, completed in 1987, is the tallest building in South Carolina.

Columbia is the economic center of South Carolina's Midlands region. As the state capital, government is a major driver of the local economy, with state agencies, the University of South Carolina, and Fort Jackson among the region's largest employers.

Healthcare and insurance are also central to Columbia's economy. The city is home to Prisma Health Midlands, one of South Carolina's largest healthcare systems, and BlueCross BlueShield of South Carolina, one of the state's largest private employers. Columbia also serves as the headquarters of several financial, insurance, and professional services firms, including First Citizens Bank, Colonial Life & Accident Insurance Company, AgFirst Farm Credit Bank, SouthState Bank, and Nelson Mullins Riley & Scarborough.

Manufacturing remains an important component of the regional economy, particularly in automotive components, industrial equipment, pharmaceuticals, and advanced materials. International companies including Michelin, Honeywell, Square D, Westinghouse Electric Company, and FN Herstal maintain manufacturing or engineering operations in the Columbia metropolitan area.

=== Urban redevelopment ===
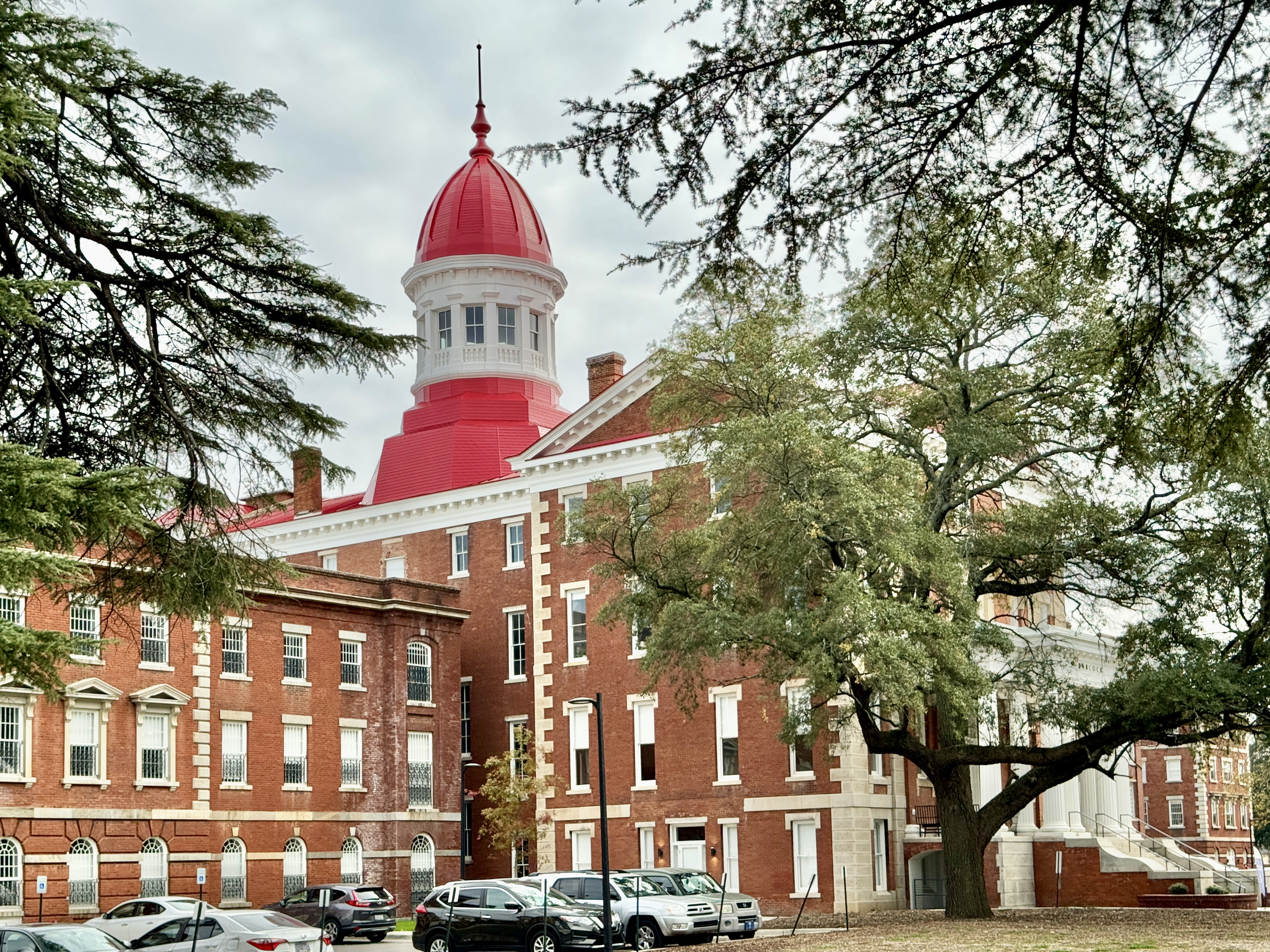
The restored Babcock Building anchors the BullStreet District.

Beginning in the late twentieth century, Columbia undertook a series of redevelopment projects that reshaped its downtown and surrounding districts. The historic Congaree Vista warehouse district was transformed through adaptive reuse into a mixed-use neighborhood of restaurants, galleries, residences, and entertainment venues centered on Gervais Street and the Columbia Metropolitan Convention Center.

Redevelopment also extended to Main Street, where streetscape improvements, façade restorations, upper-floor residential conversions, and the reuse of historic commercial buildings have encouraged new retail, dining, and residential development. Since 2005, the weekly Soda City Market has become one of downtown's principal attractions, drawing thousands of visitors and supporting local businesses every Saturday.

The city's largest redevelopment initiative is the BullStreet District, a mixed-use neighborhood on the former South Carolina State Hospital campus. The 181-acre project includes the restoration of several historic hospital buildings, including the landmark Babcock Building, together with new residential, office, retail, medical, and entertainment development. The district is also home to Prisma Health Park, home of the Columbia Fireflies, and the University of South Carolina's Health Sciences campus.

== Arts and culture ==
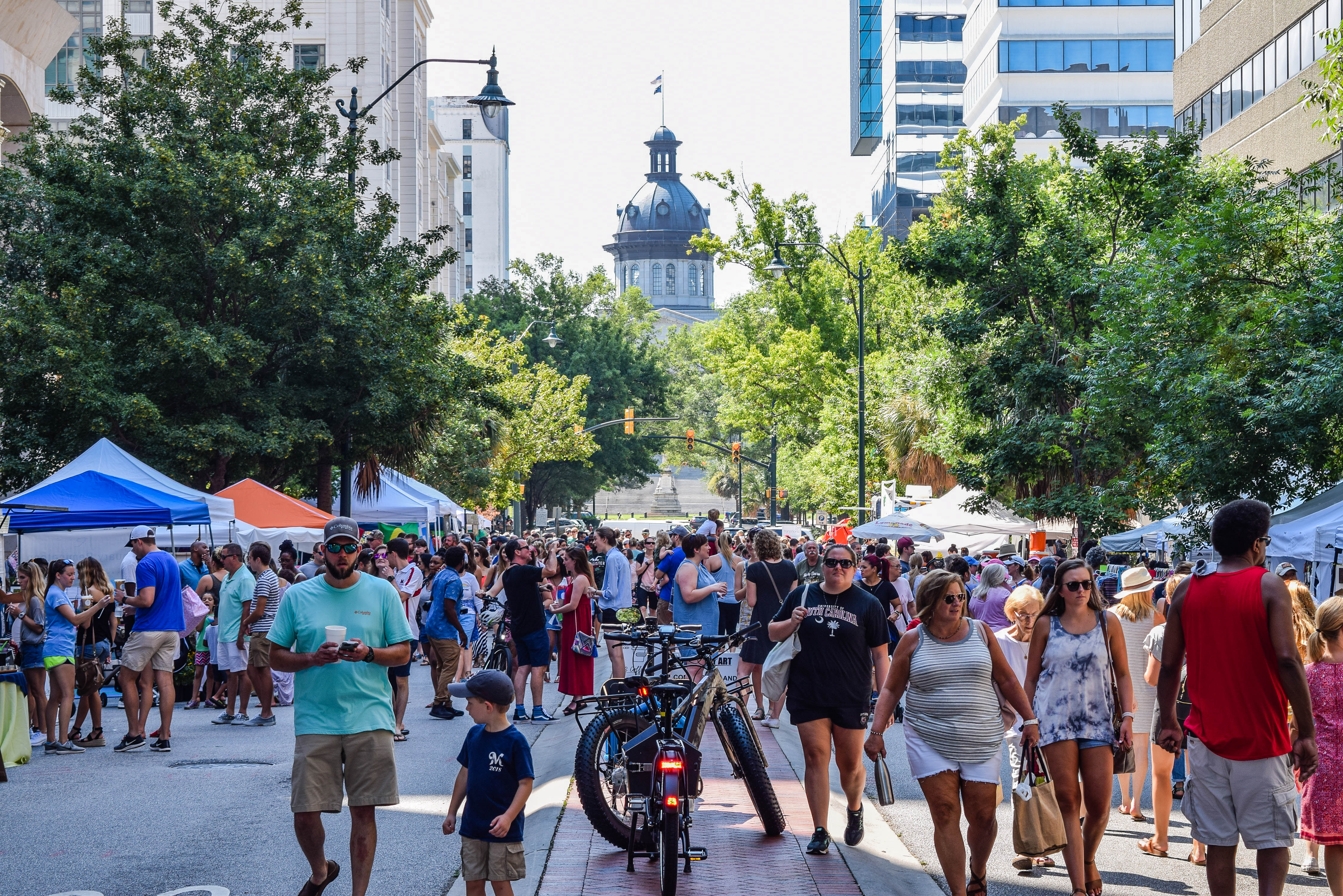
Soda City Market in Columbia SC with the dome

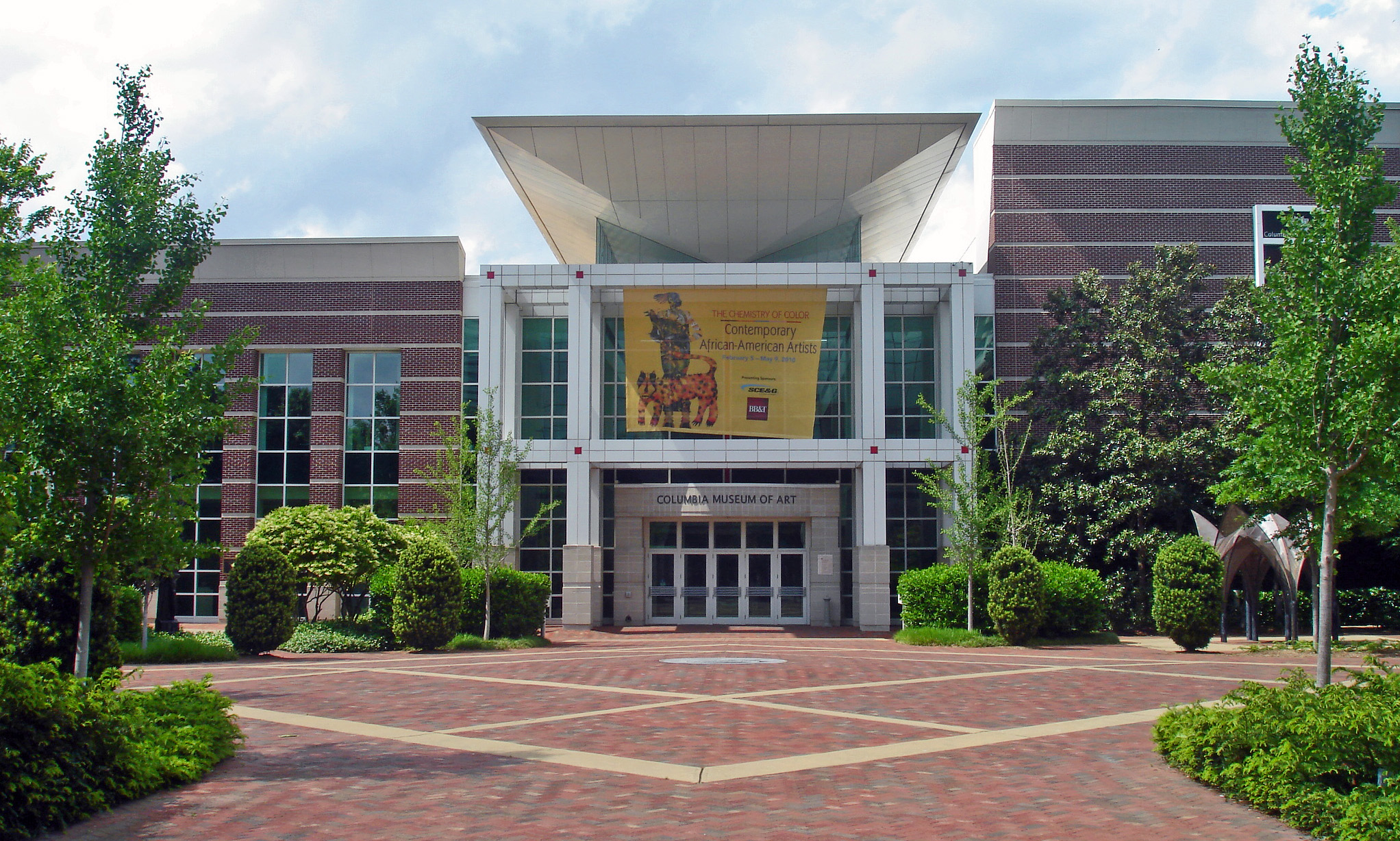
Columbia Museum of Art

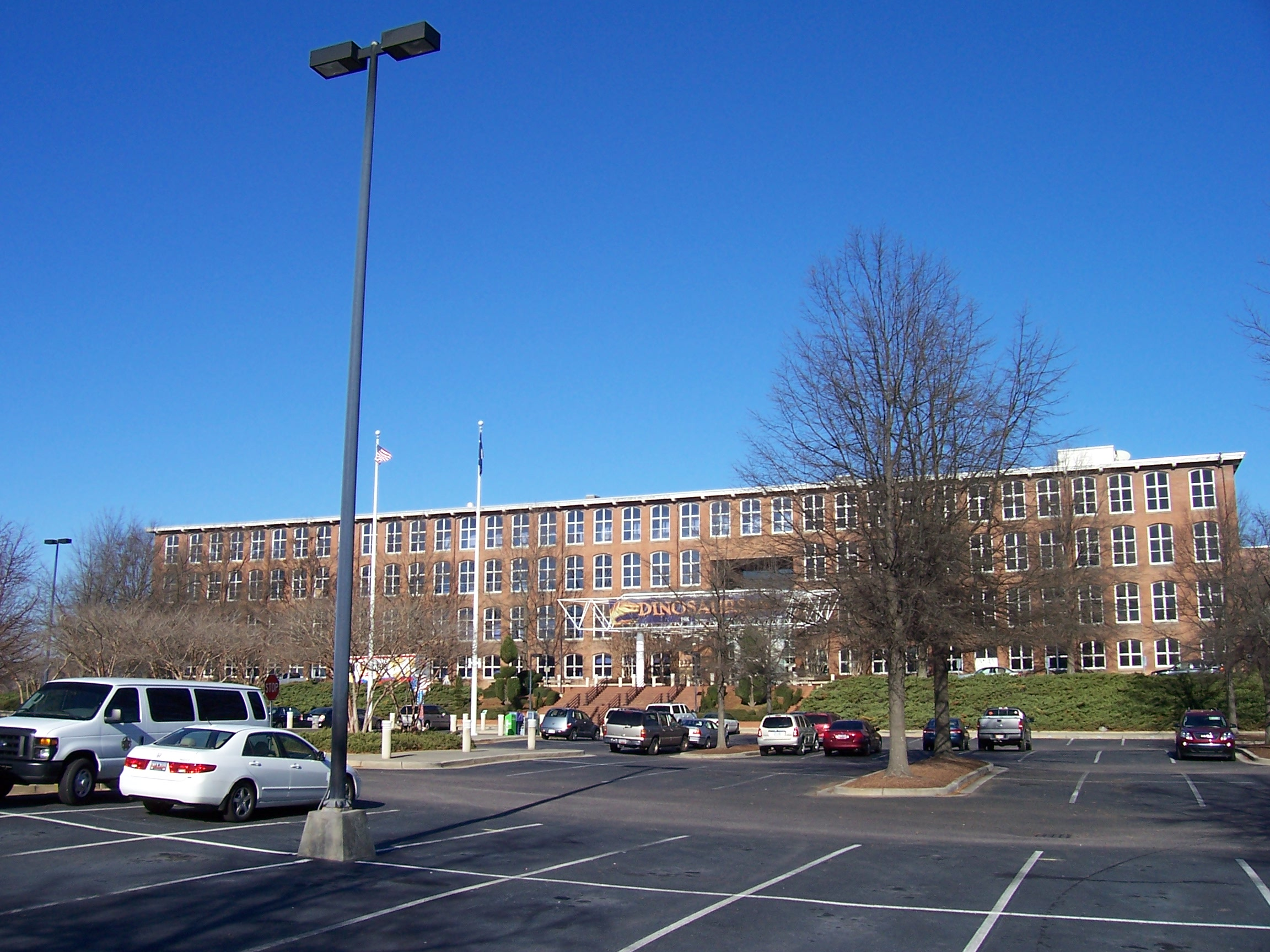
South Carolina State Museum in textile mill built in 1894

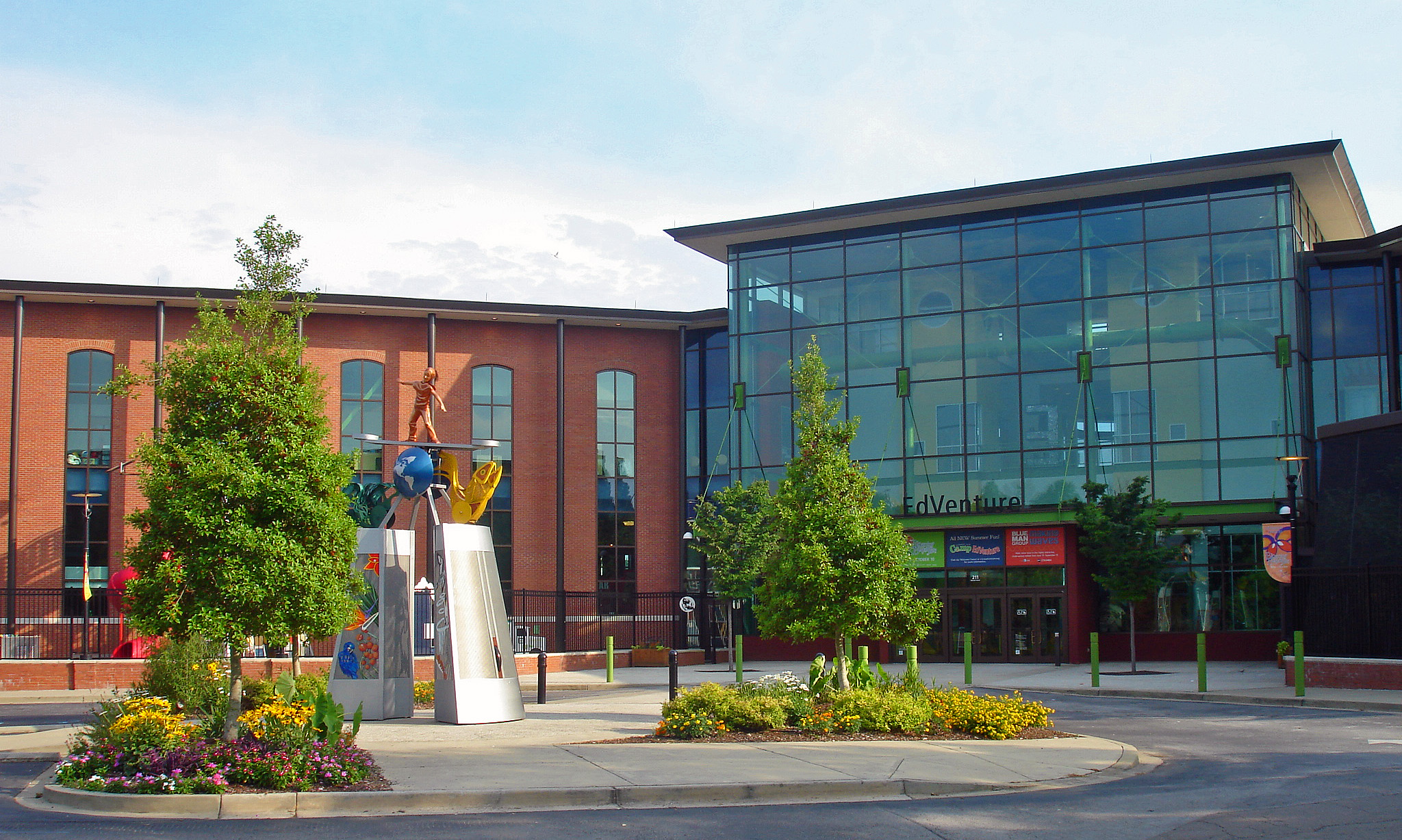
EdVenture

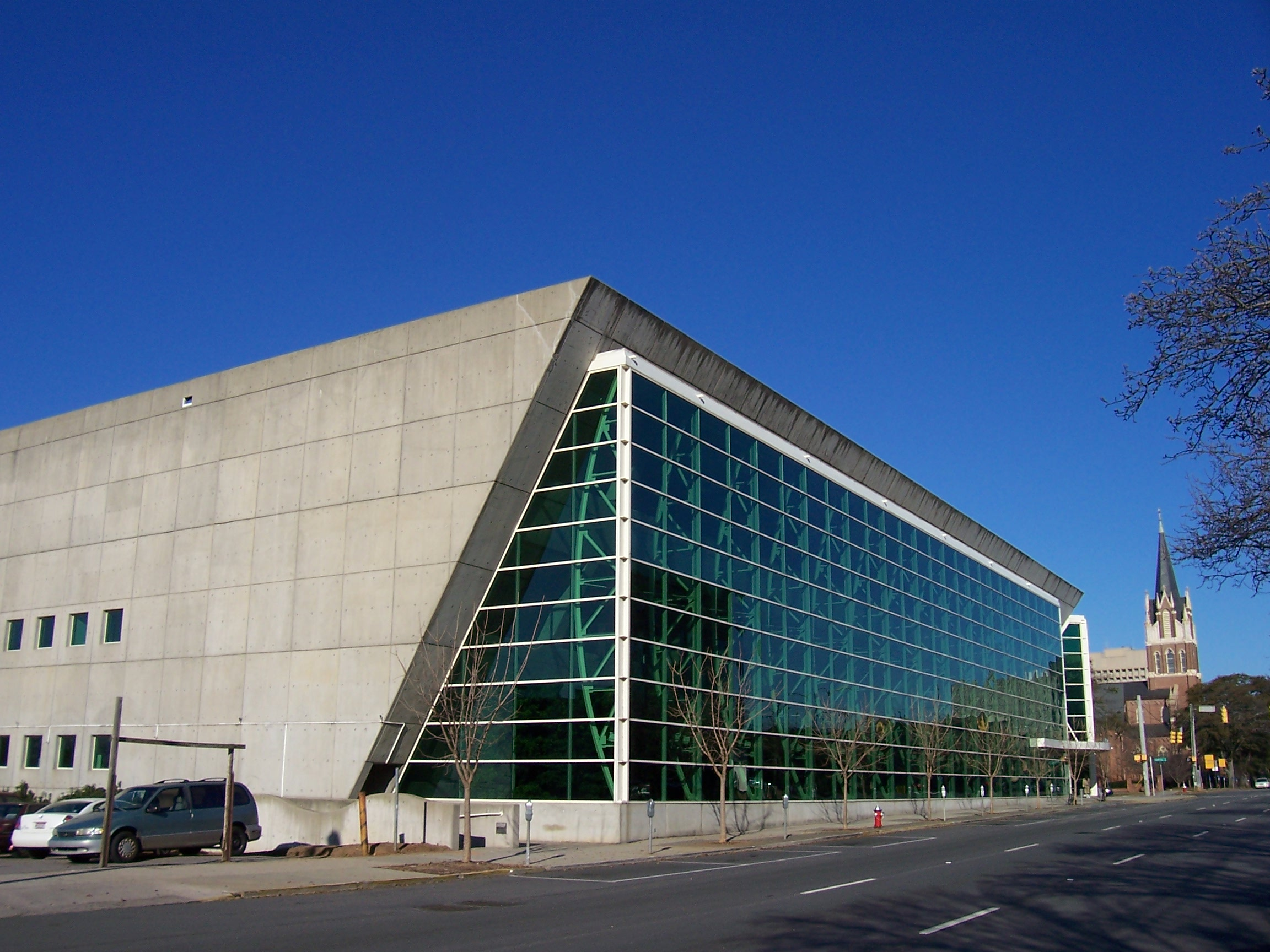
Richland County Public Library

- Alternacirque, professional circus that produces variety shows and full-scale themed productions. Formed in 2007, Alternacirque is directed by Natalie Brown.
- Busted Plug Plaza, location of Busted Plug, the world's largest fire hydrant. The sculpture was erected in 2001 by Columbia artist known as Blue Sky. The sculpture was located on Taylor Street in downtown Columbia. It has since been removed with no new final location decided.
- Columbia Choral Society, performing throughout the community since 1930. Under the direction of William Carswell, the group strives to stimulate and broaden interest in musical activities and to actively engage in the rehearsal and rendition of choral music.
- South Carolina Ballet, formerly known as Columbia City Ballet, is Columbia's ballet company, offering more than 80 major performances annually. Artistic director William Starrett, formerly of the Joffrey Ballet and American Ballet Theatre, runs the company.
- Columbia City Jazz Dance Company, formed in 1990 by artistic director Dale Lam, was named one of the "Top 50 Dance Companies in the USA" by Dance Spirit magazine. Columbia City Jazz specializes in modern, lyrical, and percussive jazz dance styles and has performed locally, regionally, and nationally in exhibitions, competitions, community functions, and international tours in Singapore, Plovdiv, Bulgaria, and Austria.
- Columbia Marionette Theatre, only free standing theatre in the nation devoted entirely to marionette arts.
- Columbia Museum of Art, features changing exhibits throughout the year. Located at the corner of Hampton and Main Streets, the museum offers art, lectures, films, and guided tours.
- EdVenture, one of the South's largest children's museums and the second largest in South Carolina. It is located next to the South Carolina State Museum on Gervais Street. The museum allows children to explore and learn while having fun.
- McKissick Museum, located on the University of South Carolina campus. The museum features changing exhibitions of art, science, regional history, and folk art.
- Nickelodeon Theater, a 2-screen, store front theater located on Main Street between Taylor and Blanding Streets. In operation since 1979, "the Nick", run by the Columbia Film Society, is home to two film screenings each evening and an additional matinée three days a week. The Nick is the only non-profit art house film theater in South Carolina and is the home for 25,000 filmgoers each year.
- Palmetto Opera, debuted in 2003 with a performance of "Love, Murder & Revenge," a mixture of scenes from famous operas. The organization's mission is to present professional opera to the Midlands and South Carolina.
- Pocket Productions, an arts organization devoted to inspiring and expanding the arts community in Columbia, SC, through ArtRageous, Playing After Dark and other community-based collaborative events.
- Richland County Public Library, named the 2001 National Library of the Year, serves area citizens through its main library and nine branches. The 242,000-square-foot (22,500 m^{2}) main library has a large book collection, provides reference services, utilizes the latest technology, houses a children's collection, and displays artwork.
- South Carolina Confederate Relic Room & Military Museum, an artifact collection from the Colonial period to the space age. The museum houses a diverse collection of artifacts from the South Carolina confederate period. It is located in the South Carolina State Museum building.
- South Carolina Philharmonic Orchestra, Columbia's resident orchestra. The Philharmonic produces a full season of orchestral performances each year. Renowned musicians come to Columbia to perform as guest artists with the orchestra. In April 2008 Morihiko Nakahara was named the new music director of the Philharmonic.
- South Carolina Shakespeare Company, performs the plays of Shakespeare and other classical works throughout the state.
- South Carolina State Museum, a comprehensive museum with exhibits in science, technology, history, and the arts. It is the state's largest museum and one of the largest museums in the Southeast.
- South Carolina State Library, provides library services to all citizens of South Carolina through the interlibrary loan service utilized by the public libraries located in each county.
- Town Theatre, oldest community theatre in continuous use. Located a block from the University of South Carolina campus, its playhouse is listed on the National Register of Historic Places. Since 1917, the theatre has produced plays and musicals of wide general appeal.
- Trustus Theatre, Columbia's professional theatre company. Founded in 1985, Trustus brought a new dimension to theatre in South Carolina's capital city. Patrons have the opportunity to watch new shows directly from the stages of New York as well as classic shows rarely seen in Columbia.
- Workshop Theatre of South Carolina, opened in 1967 as a place where area directors could practice their craft. The theatre produces musicals and Broadway fare and also brings new theatrical material to Columbia.

Movies filmed in the Columbia area include The Program, Renaissance Man, Chasers, Death Sentence, A Guy Named Joe, and Accidental Love/Nailed.

=== Venues ===
Columbia Metropolitan Convention Center

==== Columbia Metropolitan Convention Center ====
The Columbia Metropolitan Convention Center, which opened in September 2004 as South Carolina's only downtown convention center, is a 142,500-square-foot (13,240 m^{2}), modern, state-of-the-art facility designed to host a variety of meetings and conventions. Located in the historic Congaree Vista district, this facility is close to restaurants, antique and specialty shops, art galleries, and various nightlife venues. The main exhibit hall contains almost 25,000 square feet (2,300 m^{2}) of space; the Columbia Ballroom over 18,000 square feet (1,700 m^{2}); and the five meeting rooms ranging in size from 1500 to 4,000 square feet (400 m^{2}) add another 15,000 square feet (1,400 m^{2}) of space. The facility is located next to the Colonial Life Arena.

==== Koger Center for the Arts ====
Koger Center for the Arts provides Columbia with theatre, music, and dance performances that range from local acts to global acts. The facility seats 2,256 persons. The center is named for philanthropists Ira and Nancy Koger, who made a substantial donation from personal and corporate funds for construction of the $15 million center. The first performance at the Koger Center was given by the London Philharmonic Orchestra and took place on Saturday, January 14, 1989. The facility is known for hosting diverse events, from the State of the State Address to the South Carolina Body Building Championship and the South Carolina Science Fair.

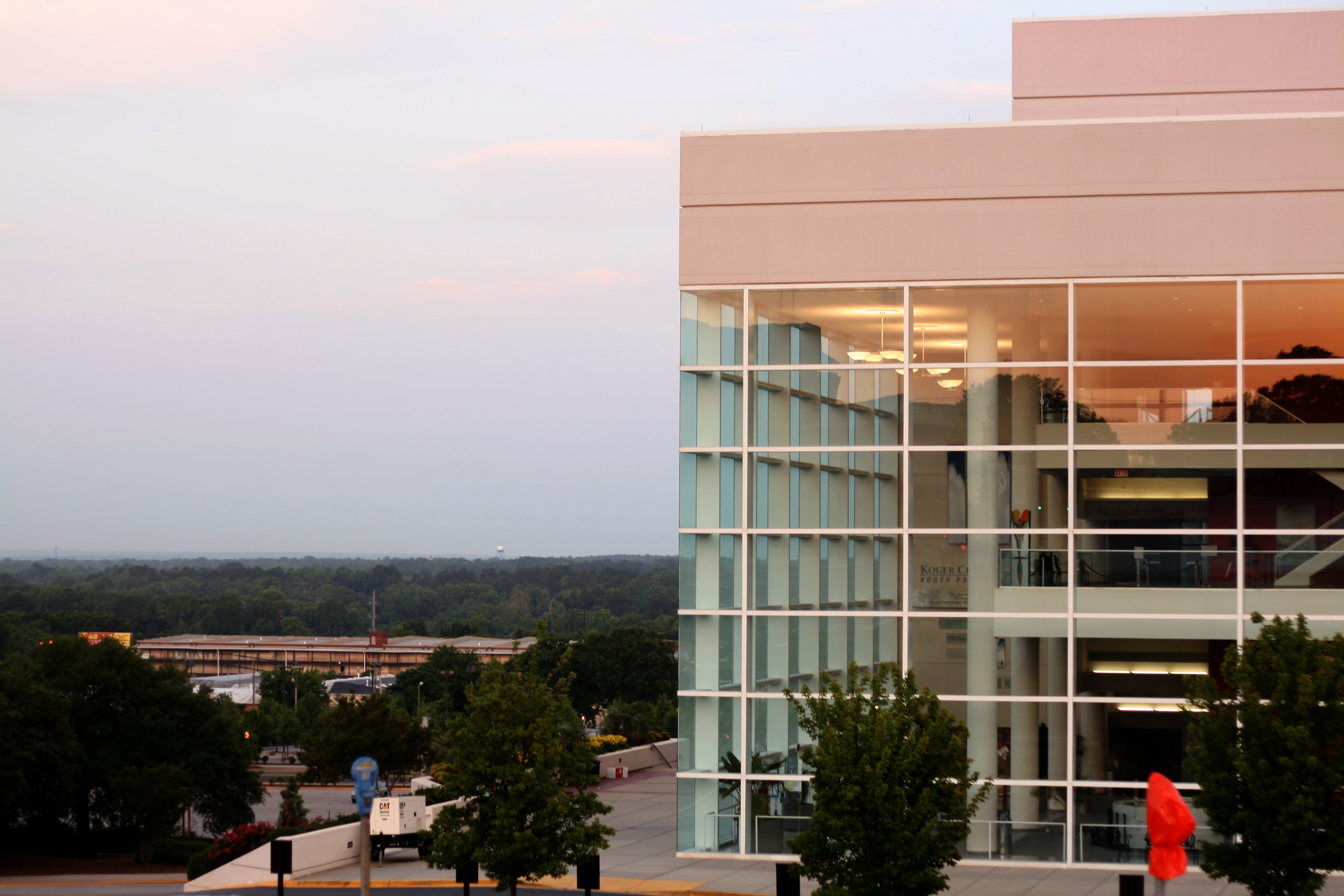
Koger Center for the Arts

==== Carolina Coliseum ====
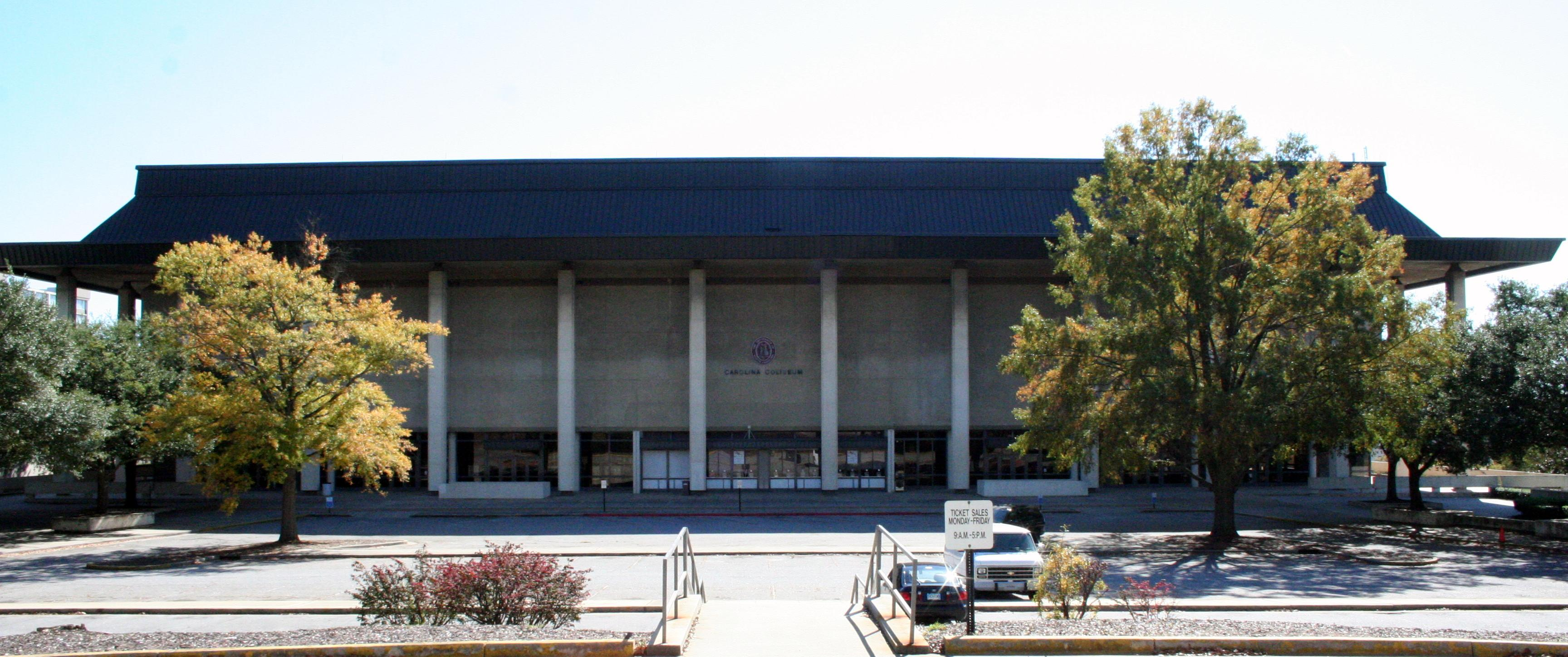
The Carolina Coliseum (1968) facing Assembly St.

Carolina Coliseum, which opened in 1968, is a 12,401-seat facility which initially served as the home of the USC Gamecocks' basketball teams. The arena could be easily adapted to serve other entertainment purposes, including concerts, car shows, circuses, ice shows, and other events. The versatility and quality of the coliseum at one time allowed the university to use the facility for performing arts events such as the Boston Pops, Chicago Symphony, Feld Ballet, and other performances by important artists. An acoustical shell and a state-of-the-art lighting system assisted the coliseum in presenting such activities. The coliseum was the home of the Columbia Inferno, an ECHL team. However, since the construction of the Colonial Life Arena in 2002, the coliseum now is the center for the men's and women's basketball programs, with the center arena now housing the two main practice courts.

==== Township Auditorium ====
Township Auditorium seats 3,099 capacity and is located in downtown Columbia. The Georgian Revival building was designed by the Columbia architectural firm of Lafaye and Lafaye and constructed in 1930. The Township has hosted thousands of events from concerts to conventions to wrestling matches. The auditorium was listed in the National Register of Historic Places on September 28, 2005, and has recently undergone a $12 million extensive interior and exterior renovation.

== Sports ==
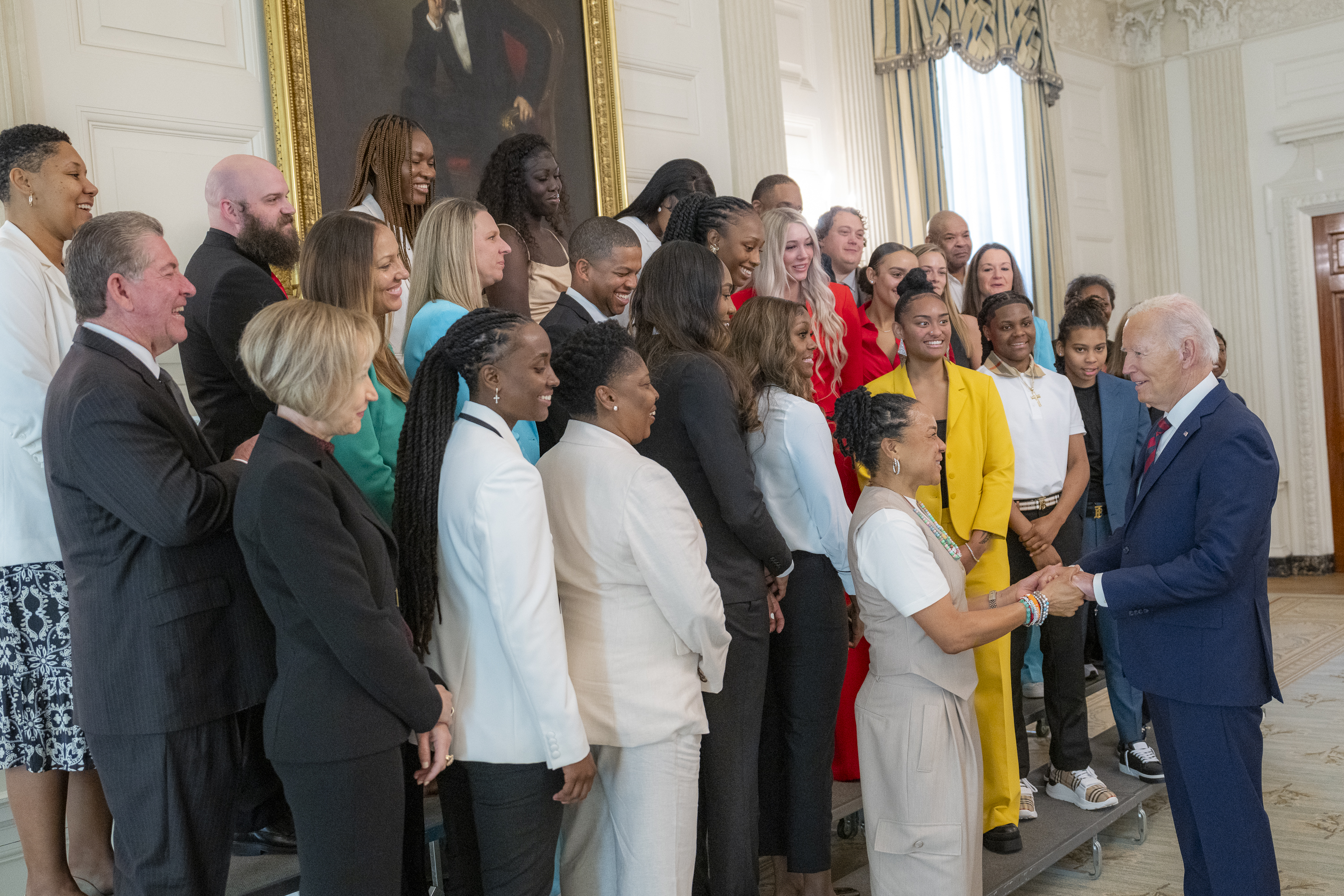
The South Carolina Gamecocks women's basketball team visits the White House following its 2024 national championship.

Sports in Columbia are centered on the athletic programs of the University of South Carolina, whose Gamecocks compete in the Southeastern Conference (SEC). The university's football, baseball, men's basketball, and women's basketball programs draw some of the largest sporting crowds in South Carolina and have helped establish Columbia as one of the state's leading collegiate sports centers.

Under head coach Dawn Staley, the South Carolina women's basketball program has become one of the nation's premier collegiate programs, winning multiple NCAA national championships and regularly competing for Southeastern Conference titles. The Gamecocks baseball program has also achieved national prominence, winning consecutive College World Series championships in 2010 and 2011.

Columbia is also home to the Columbia Fireflies, a Minor League Baseball club that competes in the Carolina League, the SC United Bantams of USL League Two, and the Columbia Old Grey Rugby Football Club.

The city has hosted numerous national and international sporting events, including the U.S. Women's Olympic Marathon Trials in 1996 and 2000 and the 2007 ICF Junior Wildwater Canoe and Kayak World Championships. Colonial Life Arena has also hosted NCAA tournament games, Southeastern Conference championships, and National Basketball Association preseason exhibitions.

=== Sports venues ===
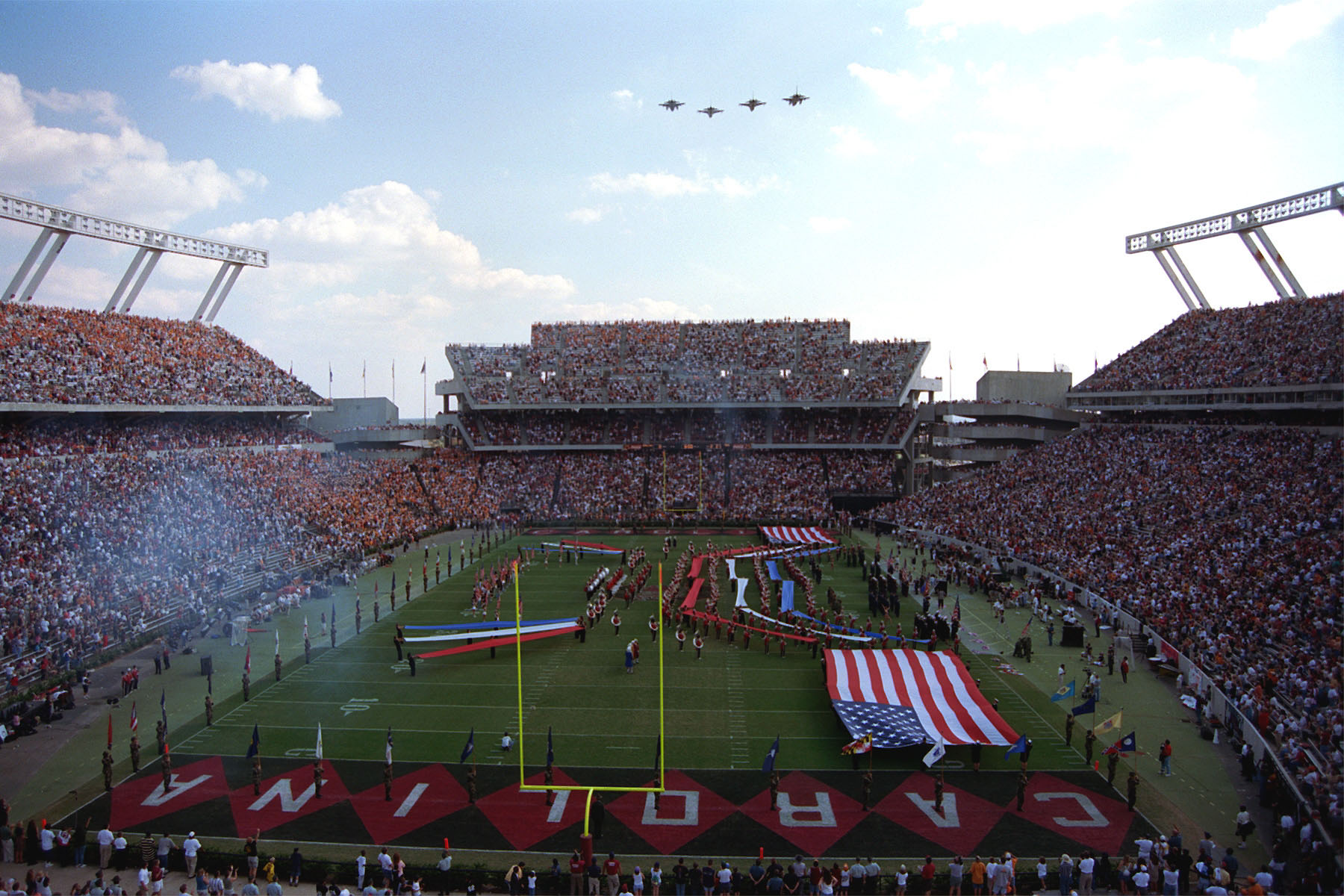
Williams-Brice Stadium, home of the South Carolina Gamecocks football team.

Williams-Brice Stadium is home to South Carolina Gamecocks football. Originally opened in 1934, the stadium has undergone numerous expansions and renovations and now seats more than 77,000 spectators, making it one of the largest stadiums in the Southeastern Conference. In the 2020s, the university launched a multi-phase modernization program that includes premium seating, improved fan amenities, and major upgrades to the west side of the stadium.

Several modern venues constructed during the early twenty-first century have reshaped Columbia's sports and entertainment landscape. Colonial Life Arena, which opened in 2002, is South Carolina's largest arena and hosts Gamecock basketball, concerts, and major touring events. Founders Park, completed in 2009, serves as home of the nationally prominent Gamecocks baseball program, while Prisma Health Park, which opened in 2016 as part of the BullStreet District, is home to the Columbia Fireflies and has become a centerpiece of the city's ongoing redevelopment.

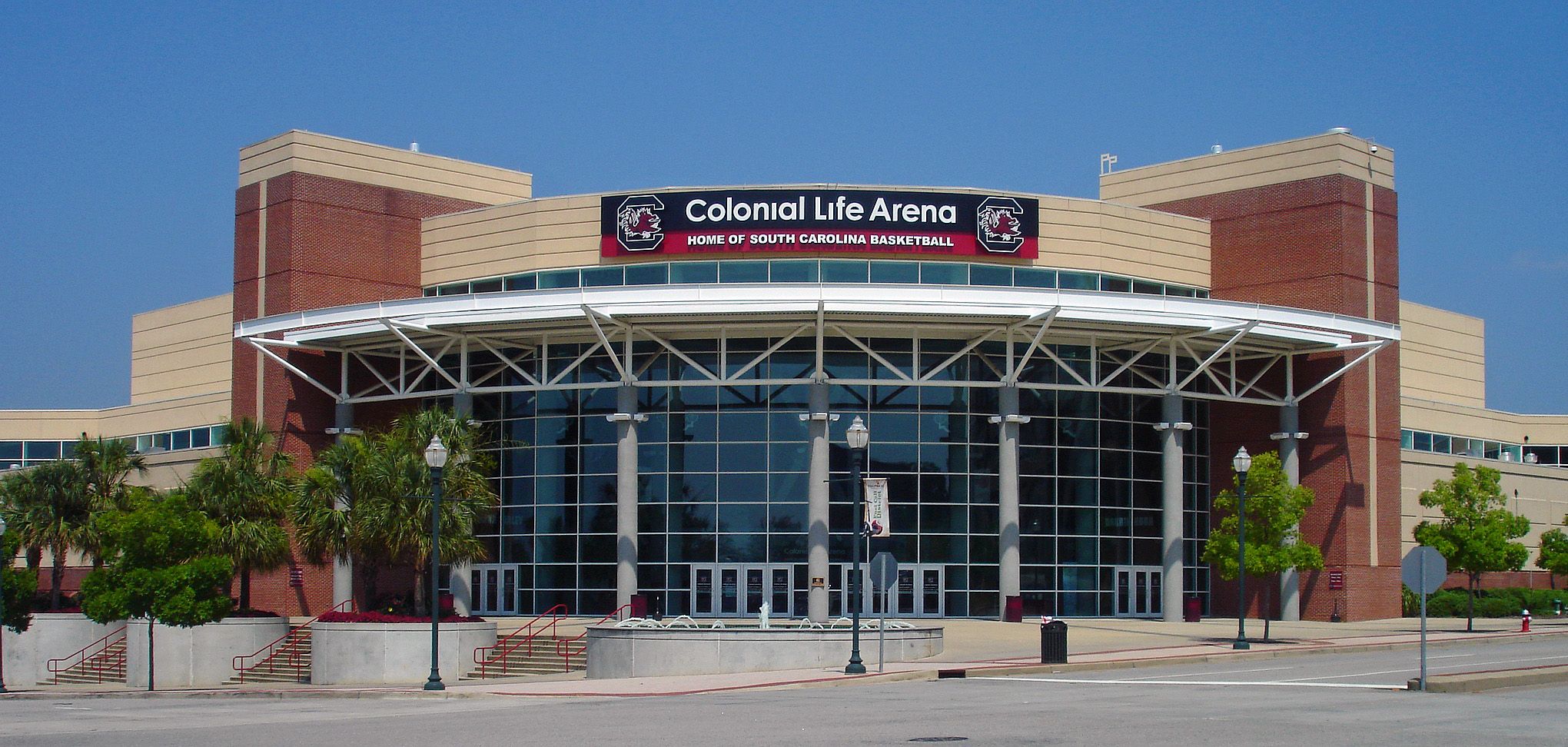
Colonial Life Arena

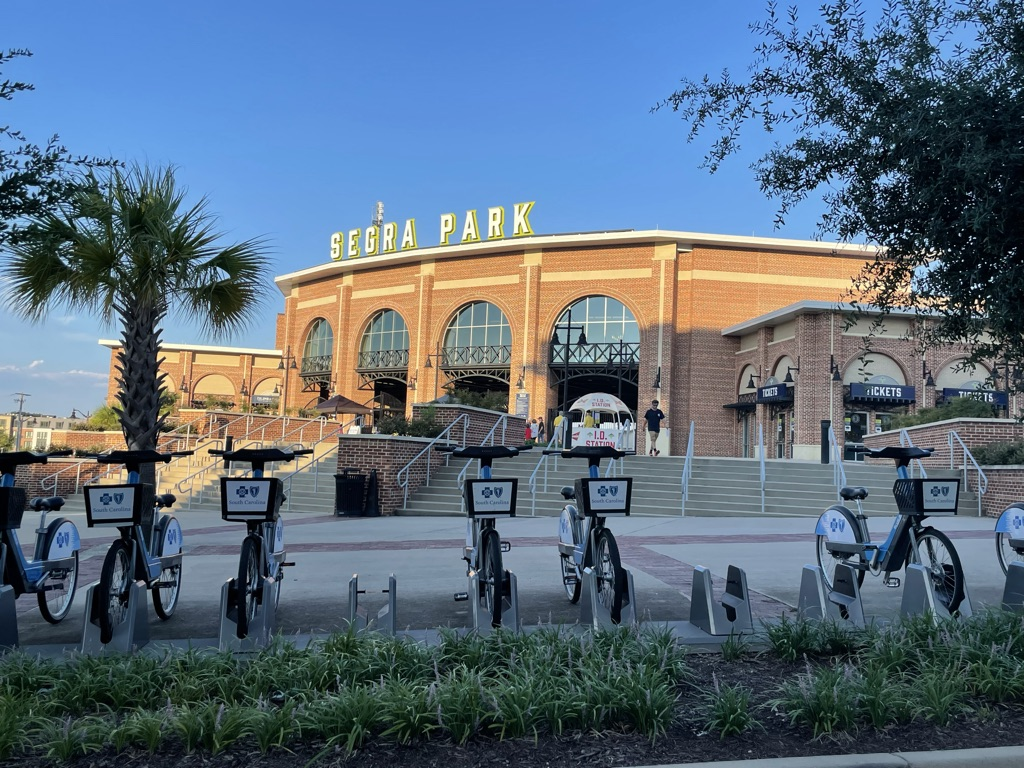
Prisma Health Park

Other notable venues include Charlie W. Johnson Stadium, home of Benedict College football and an important venue for HBCU athletics and community events, and the Carolina Coliseum, which served as the longtime home of South Carolina basketball before the opening of Colonial Life Arena and remains a prominent landmark on the University of South Carolina campus.

== Parks and recreation ==
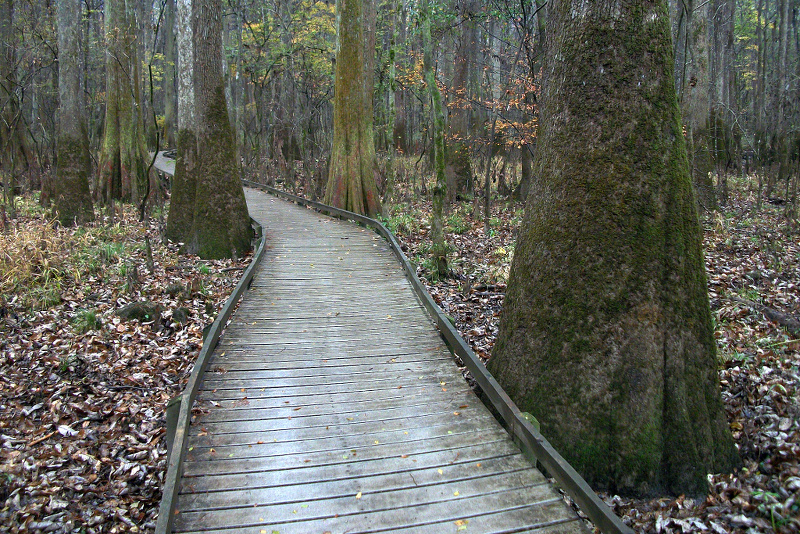
The boardwalk through Congaree National Park, located southeast of Columbia.

Columbia's parks and recreation system is centered on the Broad, Saluda, and Congaree rivers, which support boating, fishing, paddling, and an expanding network of greenways and riverwalks, including the Three Rivers Greenway and the Columbia Canal.

The city's signature public park is Finlay Park, an 18-acre downtown park originally established in 1859 as Sidney Park. Following a multi-year, $25 million revitalization project, the park reopened in 2025 with restored water features, new event spaces, recreational amenities, and enhanced landscaping.

Riverbanks Zoo & Garden, located along the Saluda River, is one of South Carolina's leading tourist attractions. The 170-acre zoological park and botanical garden is home to more than 3,000 animals representing over 400 species.

Although located outside the city limits, Congaree National Park and Lake Murray are closely associated with Columbia and are among the region's most popular outdoor destinations. Congaree National Park protects the largest intact expanse of old-growth bottomland hardwood forest in the southeastern United States, while Lake Murray is widely used for boating, fishing, sailing, and other water recreation.

== Government ==
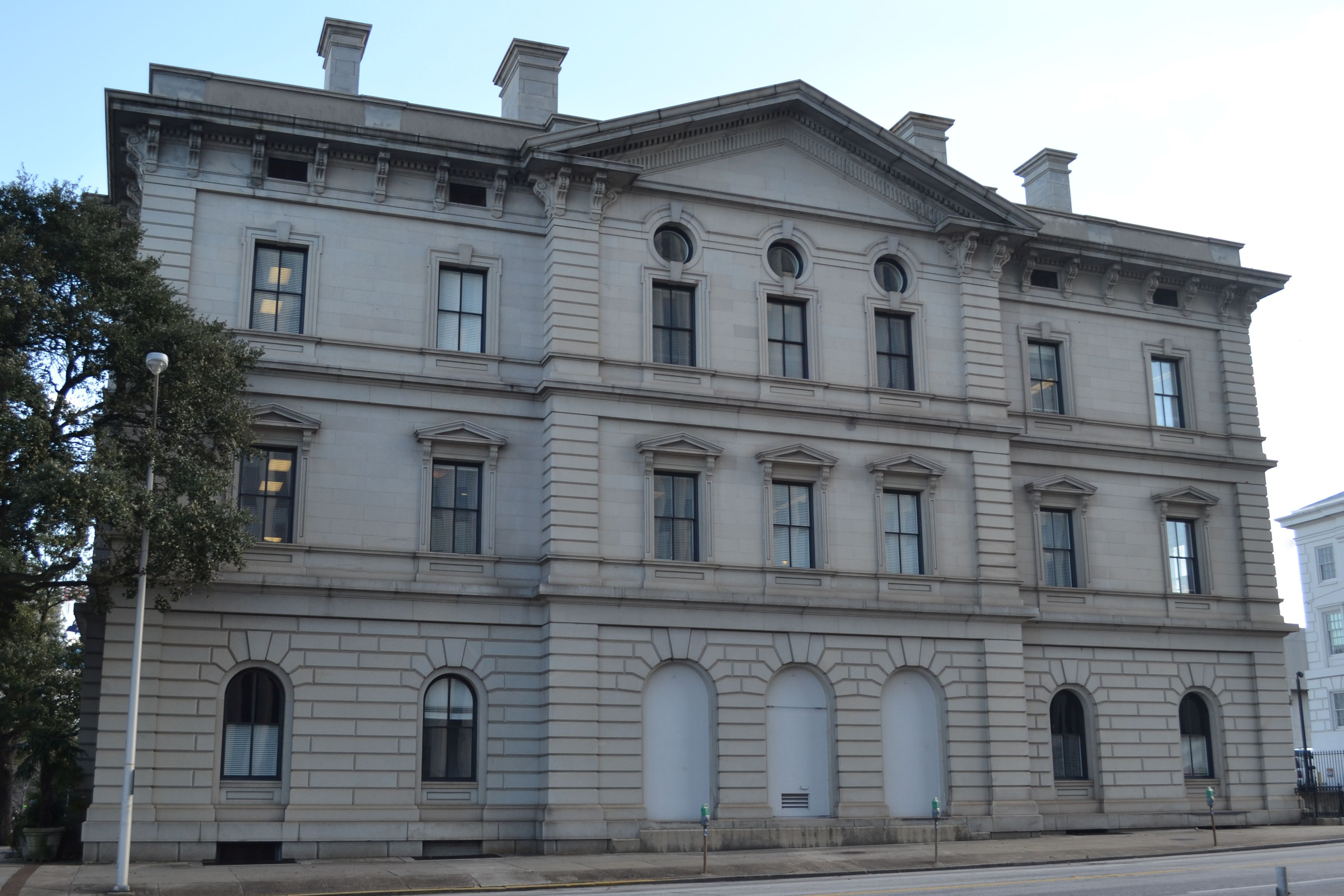
Columbia City Hall

Columbia operates under a council-manager form of government, in which legislative authority is vested in the mayor and six-member city council, while the city manager oversees the city's day-to-day administration. Four council members are elected from single-member districts and two are elected at large, together with the mayor, to four-year terms. The current mayor is Daniel Rickenmann, who took office on January 4, 2022.

As the capital of South Carolina, Columbia serves as the seat of the state's executive, legislative, and judicial branches of government. The South Carolina State House houses the South Carolina General Assembly, while the surrounding Capitol Complex contains the offices of the governor, lieutenant governor, Supreme Court, and numerous state agencies. State government is one of the city's largest employers and a major contributor to the regional economy.

Public safety services are provided by the Columbia Police Department and the Columbia-Richland Fire Department.

== Education ==
=== Higher education ===
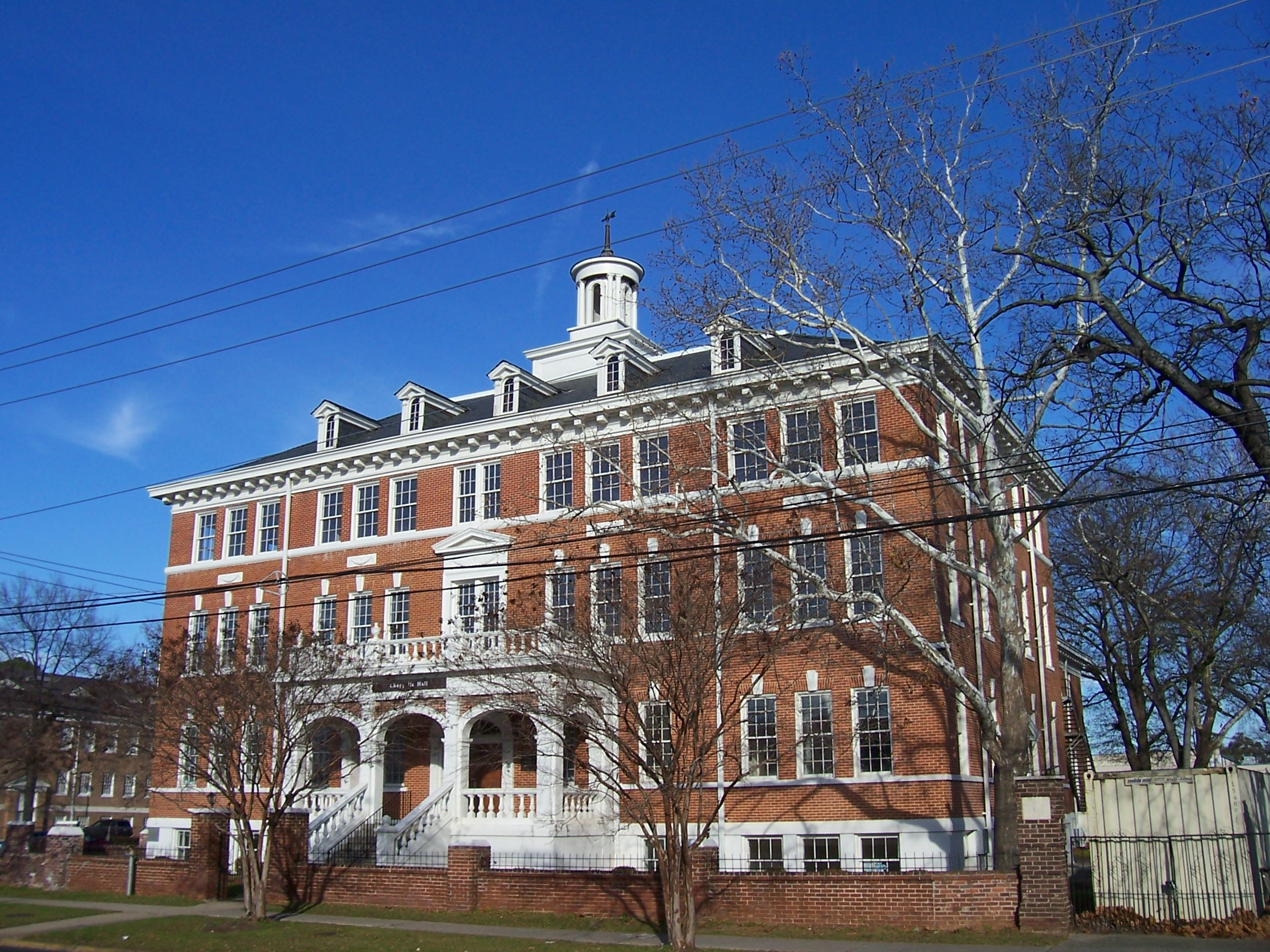
The Chappelle Administration Building, the historic centerpiece of Allen University.

Columbia is the principal center of higher education in South Carolina. The city is home to the University of South Carolina, the state's flagship public university, which was chartered in 1801 as South Carolina College shortly after Columbia was selected as the state capital. Renamed the University of South Carolina in 1906, it has grown into the state's largest university, enrolling more than 30,000 students on its Columbia campus and more than 50,000 statewide. The university is classified among "R1: Doctoral Universities – Very High Research Activity" by the Carnegie Foundation and serves as a major educational, economic, and cultural anchor for the city. Its Darla Moore School of Business is internationally recognized for its undergraduate international business program.

Other institutions of higher education include Allen University and Benedict College, both historically Black institutions founded in 1870 during Reconstruction; Columbia College, founded in 1854; Columbia International University; Lutheran Theological Southern Seminary, one of the oldest Lutheran seminaries in North America; and Midlands Technical College, the region's public technical college. Columbia also hosts branch campuses of South University, University of Phoenix, and Erskine Theological Seminary.

=== Primary and secondary education ===
Most of Columbia is served by Richland County School District One, while northern portions of the city are within Richland County School District Two and small areas extend into Lexington & Richland County School District Five. Schools on Fort Jackson are operated by the Department of Defense Education Activity for elementary grades, with Richland County School District Two serving secondary students.

Notable independent schools include Cardinal Newman School, Hammond School, and Heathwood Hall.

=== Libraries ===
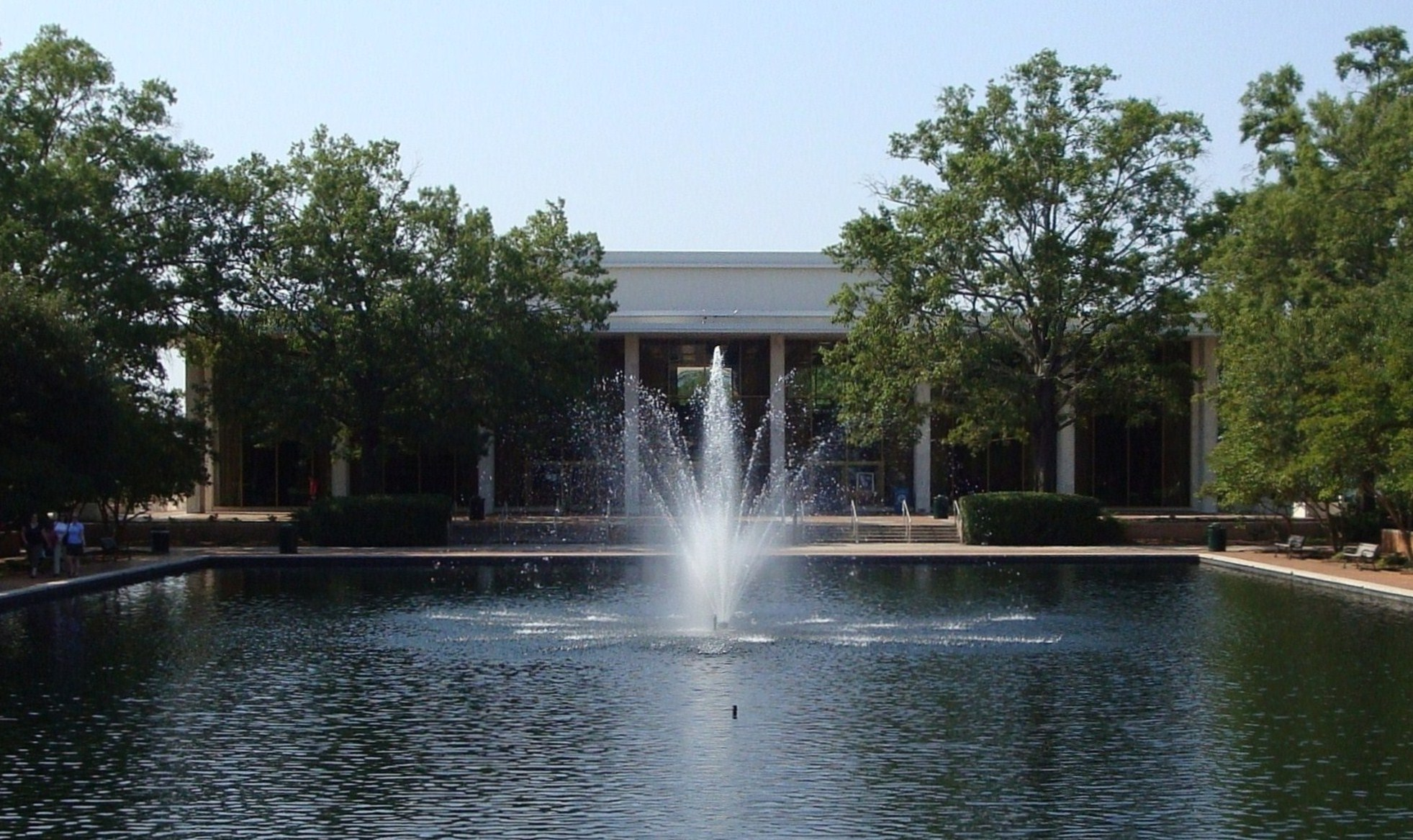
The Thomas Cooper Library, the largest academic library in South Carolina.

Columbia is served by Richland Library, whose Main Library is located downtown. The public library system operates the Main Library and 12 branch locations throughout Richland County and was named the 2001 National Library of the Year by Library Journal and the Gale Group. The city is also home to the University of South Carolina Libraries, anchored by Thomas Cooper Library, the largest academic library in South Carolina.

== Media ==
Columbia's daily newspaper is The State.

The Post and Courier of Charleston, which bought the alt-weekly Free Times in 2016, circulates a Columbia weekly edition, in which Free Times has become an arts-focused section.

Cola Daily, is a digital newsroom affiliated with Midlands Media Group, which also owns two radio stations.

Alternative newspapers include The Columbia Star, Carolina Panorama Newspaper, and SC Black News.

The Daily Gamecock, the student-run campus newspaper at USC, is also distributed in parts of the city.

Columbia Metropolitan Magazine is a bi-monthly publication about news and events in the metropolitan area. Greater Columbia Business Monthly highlights economic development, business, education, and the arts. Q-Notes, a bi-weekly newspaper serving the LGBT community and published in Charlotte, is distributed to locations in Columbia and via home delivery.

Columbia is home to the headquarters and production facilities of South Carolina Educational Television and South Carolina Public Radio, the state's public television and public radio networks.

Columbia is the center of the 78th largest television market in the United States. Although Columbia was the state's largest city for years, it has always been a small-to-medium market because the suburbs and rural areas are not much larger than the city proper. Network affiliates include WIS (NBC), WLTX (CBS), WACH (Fox) and WOLO (ABC).

The University of South Carolina has had a student-run radio station, WUSC-FM, since 1946.

== Infrastructure ==
=== Transportation ===
==== Mass transit ====
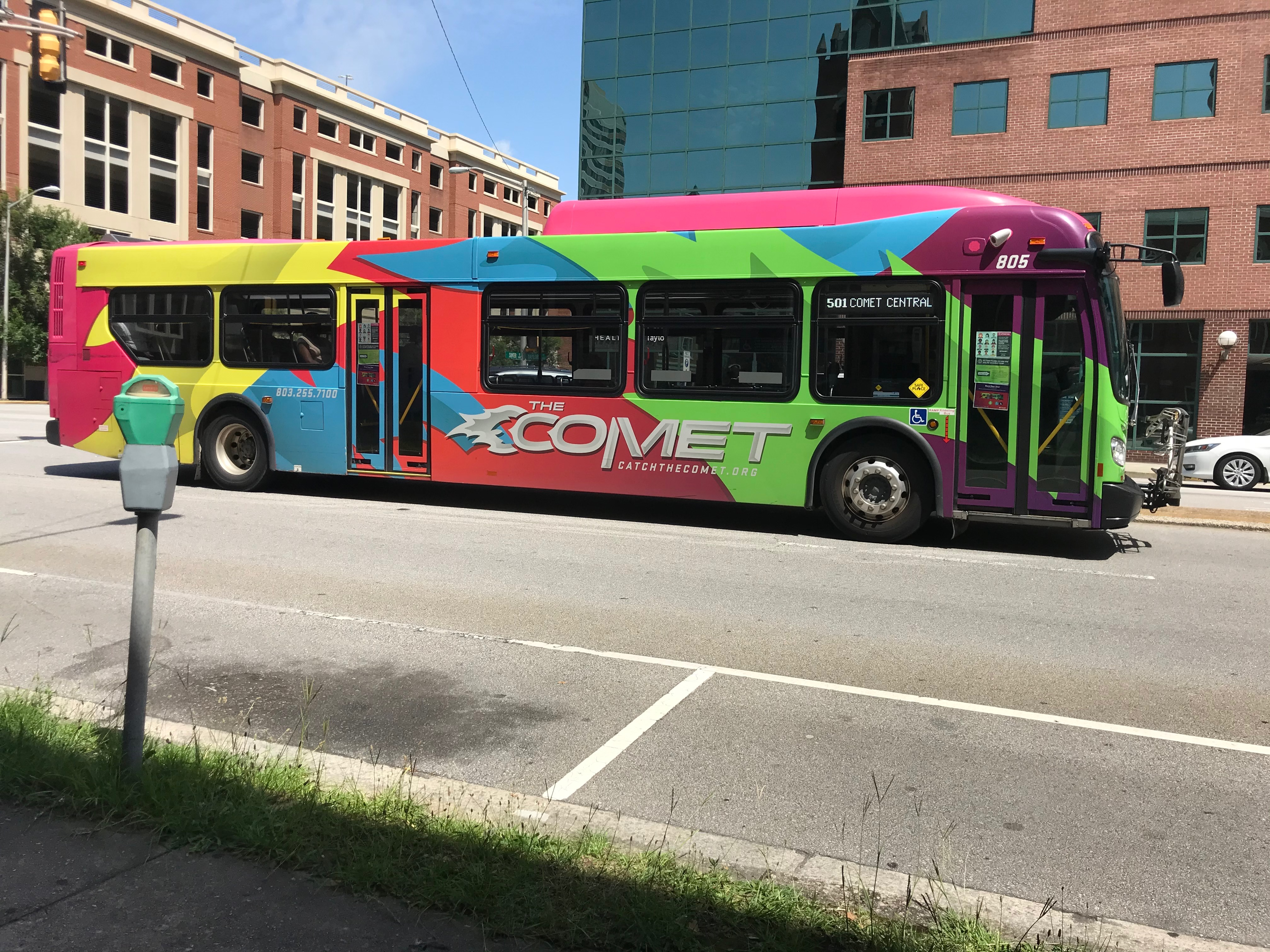
A COMET transit bus in downtown Columbia

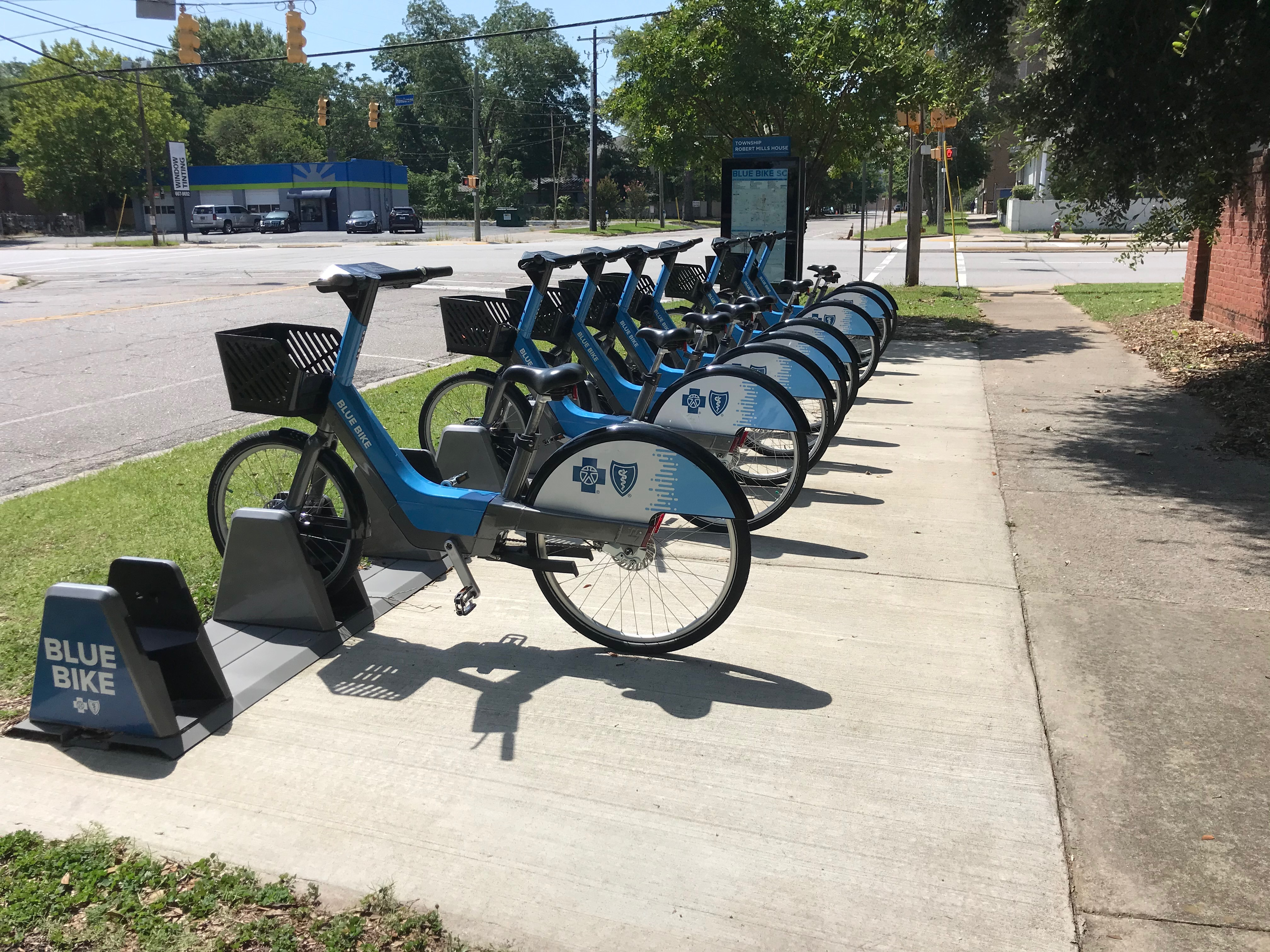
Bicycles available for rental in downtown Columbia

The Comet, officially the Central Midlands Regional Transit Authority, is the agency responsible for operating mass transit in the greater Columbia area including Cayce, West Columbia, Forest Acres, Arcadia Lakes, Springdale, Lexington and the St. Andrews area. COMET operates express shuttles, as well as bus service in Columbia and its immediate suburbs. The authority was established in October 2002 after SCANA released ownership of public transportation back to the city of Columbia. Since 2003, COMET has provided transportation for more than 2 million passengers, has expanded route services, and introduced 43 new ADA accessible buses offering a safer, more comfortable means of transportation. CMRTA has also added 10 natural gas powered buses to the fleet. Comet went under a name change and rebranding project in 2013. Before then, the system was called the Columbia Metropolitan Rapid Transit Association or "CMRTA". Additionally, COMET offers Dial-a-ride transit (DART), which provides personalized service passengers with disabilities. The University of South Carolina's transit system, which is maintained by COMET, services an additional 1,000,000 passengers annually. Blue Cross Blue Shield provides rental bicycles in downtown Columbia.

==== Roads and highways ====
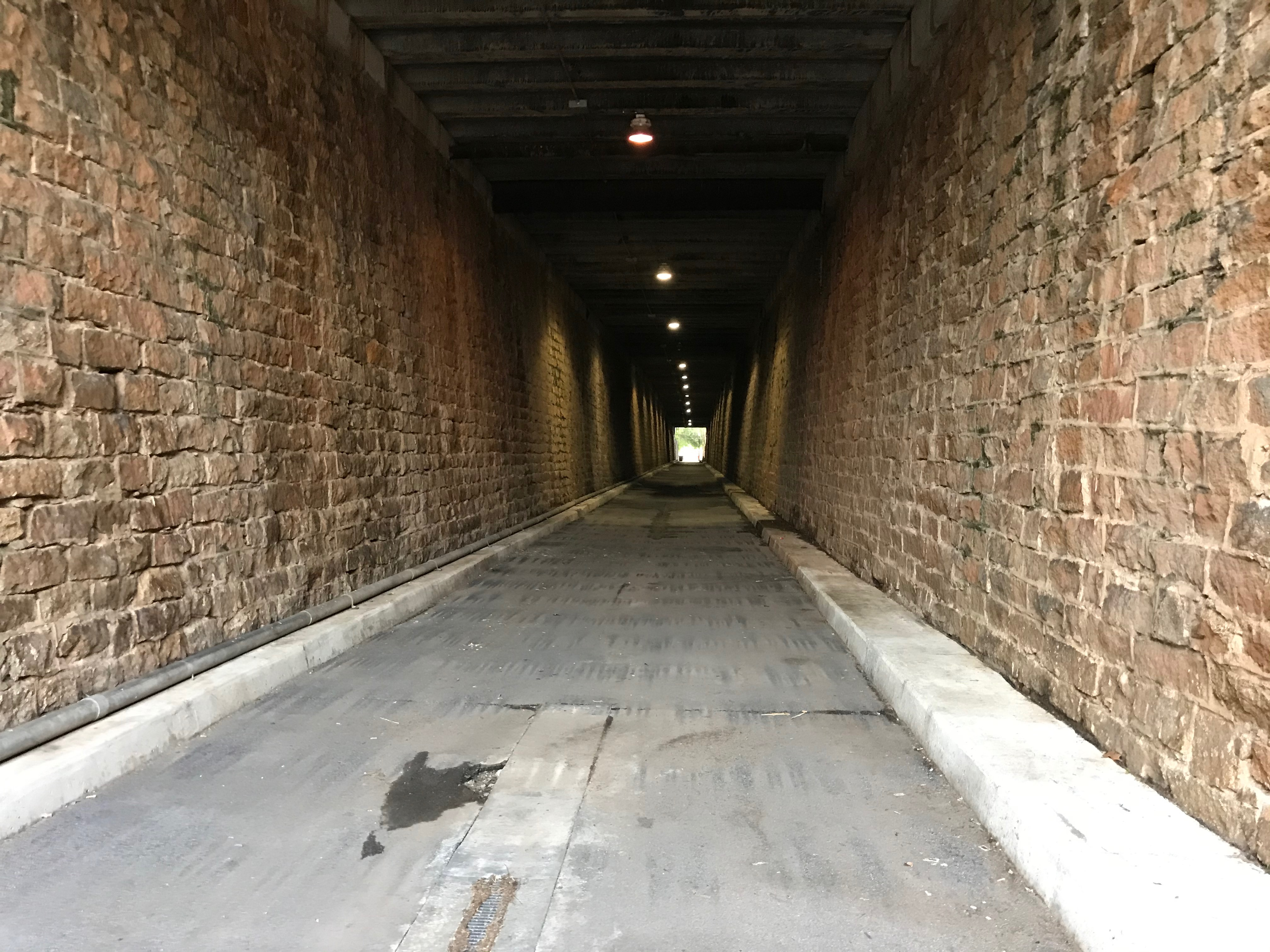
The Lincoln Street Tunnel - A pedestrian and bicycle-only tunnel converted from a former railroad tunnel, which crosses under Lincoln, Washington, and Hampton Streets

Columbia's central location between the population centers of South Carolina has made it a transportation focal point with nine State Highways: SC 12, SC 16, SC 48, SC 215, SC 262, SC 277, SC 555, SC 760, and SC 768; seven U.S. Highways: US 1, US 21, US 76, and US 176, US 321, US 378, and US 601; and four Interstate Highways:

- Interstate 20 travels from west to east and connects Columbia to Atlanta and Augusta in the west and Florence in the east. It serves the nearby towns and suburbs of Pelion, Lexington, West Columbia, the Sandhill region, Pontiac, Elgin, Lugoff, and Camden. Interstate 20 is also used by travelers heading to Myrtle Beach, although the interstate's eastern terminus is in Florence.
- Interstate 26 travels from northwest to southeast and connects Columbia to the other two major population centers of South Carolina: the Greenville-Spartanburg area in the northwestern part of the state and North Charleston – Charleston area in the southeastern part of the state. It also serves the nearby towns and suburbs of Irmo, Harbison, Gaston, and Swansea.
- Interstate 77 (William Earle Berne Beltway) begins at a junction with Interstate 26 south of Columbia and travels north to Rock Hill and Charlotte. This interstate also provides direct access to Fort Jackson, the U.S. Army's largest training base and one of Columbia's largest employers. It serves the nearby towns and suburbs of Forest Acres, Gadsden, and Blythewood.
- Interstate 126 begins downtown at Elmwood Avenue and travels west towards Interstate 26 and Interstate 20. It provides access to Riverbanks Zoo.

==== Air ====
The city and its surroundings are served by Columbia Metropolitan Airport, which has passenger flights from American Eagle, Delta Connection, and United Express airlines. The city is also served by the much smaller Jim Hamilton–L.B. Owens Airport, located in the Rosewood neighborhood. It serves as the county airport for Richland County and primarily centers around general aviation.

==== Intercity rail ====
The city is served daily by Amtrak station, with the Silver Star trains connecting Columbia with New York City, Washington, DC, Savannah, Jacksonville, Orlando, Tampa, and Miami. The station is located at 850 Pulaski St.

Until 1959 the Southern Railway's Skyland Special (Asheville, North Carolina - Jacksonville, Florida) made a stop in Columbia's Union Station. Until 1966 the Southern Railway's Augusta Special went north from Columbia Union Station to New York City via Charlotte, North Carolina and went west to Augusta, Georgia's Union Station, where passengers could make connections to Georgia Railroad trains to Atlanta, Georgia. The Charleston branch of the Southern's Carolina Special made a stop in Columbia. Until 1954 a regional Atlantic Coast Line Railroad train went to Florence and Wilmington.

==== Intercity bus ====
Greyhound Lines formerly operated a station on Gervais Street, in the eastern part of downtown, providing Columbia with intercity bus transportation. The station relocated to 710 Buckner Road in February 2015.

MegaBus began operations in Columbia in 2015. Their routes include stops in Atlanta, Fayetteville, North Carolina, Richmond, Virginia, Washington, DC, and New York City, New York. The station is located on Sumter Street.

=== Health care ===
Prisma Health Baptist Hospital

The Sisters of Charity Providence Hospitals is sponsored by the Sisters of Charity of Saint Augustine Health System, a non-profit organization licensed for 304 beds which operates four hospitals, including Providence Hospital in downtown Columbia founded in 1938, Providence Heart Institute, Providence Hospital Northeast, and Providence Orthopaedic and NeuroSpine Institute.

Prisma Health is a private nonprofit health company and the largest healthcare organization in South Carolina that was formed by the joining of Palmetto Health and Greenville Health System in 2019. The company has 29,500 team members, 18 acute and specialty hospitals, 2,947 beds, 300 outpatient sites, and more than 5,100 employed and independent clinicians across its clinically integrated inVio Health Network. Prisma Health serves almost 1.5 million unique patients annually in its 21-county market area that covers 50% of South Carolina. Prisma Health hospitals in Columbia include the Midlands' only Level 1 trauma center and academic medical center, Richland Hospital, as well as Children's Hospital and the Heart Hospital also on the Richland Campus, Baptist Hospital and Baptist Parkridge Hospital.

Lexington Medical Center, opened in 1971, is a network of hospitals and urgent care centers located throughout Lexington County, with one location in Columbia.

The Wm. Jennings Bryan Dorn VA Medical Center is a 216-bed facility, encompassing acute medical, surgical, psychiatric, and long-term care.

=== Renewable energy and climate goals ===
Attaining 100 percent clean and renewable energy by 2036 is incorporated into the city's 67 climate goals. Projects include a solar farm to provide power for the wastewater treatment plant, an updated water metering system, reduction of water leaks, and replacement of polluting, city-owned vehicles.

== Sister cities ==
The city of Columbia has seven sister cities:

- Kaiserslautern, Rhineland-Palatinate, Germany
- Cluj-Napoca, Romania
- Plovdiv, Bulgaria
- Chelyabinsk, Chelyabinsk Oblast, Russia
- Yibin, Sichuan, China
- Accra, Ghana
- Taichung City, Taiwan

An eighth sister city, Columbia, Mississippi, was added after mutual aid took place between the two cities following natural disasters and recognition of their linked histories.

== See also ==
- List of capitals in the United States
- List of municipalities in South Carolina
- Columbia High School (Columbia, South Carolina)
- Columbia, Newberry and Laurens Railroad, historic railroad
- Columbia Record, former afternoon daily newspaper
- Columbia Speedway
- Columbia South Carolina Temple, an operating temple of The Church of Jesus Christ of Latter-day Saints
- Columbia Theological Seminary, formerly in Columbia, South Carolina, now in Decatur, Georgia
- George Stinney, youngest person to be executed in the United States
- List of tallest buildings in Columbia, South Carolina
- USS Columbia, at least 3 ships
