= List of alternative newspapers =

Alternative newspapers include the following, listed by country:

== Canada ==
=== Alberta ===
- Vue Weekly, Edmonton. Final issue published November, 2018. Now online.
- See Magazine, Edmonton.
- Fast Forward Weekly (FFWD), Calgary.

=== British Columbia ===
- The Georgia Straight, Vancouver
- Monday Magazine, Victoria

=== Manitoba ===
- Uptown, Winnipeg

=== Newfoundland and Labrador ===
- The Scope, St. John's

=== Nova Scotia ===
- The Coast, Halifax Regional Municipality
- The Grapevine, Annapolis Valley

=== Ontario ===
- Now, Toronto
- View Magazine, Hamilton

=== Quebec ===
- Voir, chain headquartered in Quebec (French language)

== Greece ==
- Athens Voice, Athens

== Iceland ==
- The Reykjavík Grapevine, Reykjavík

== Mexico ==
- Proceso, Mexico City
- ZETA, Tijuana

== Russia ==
- The eXile, Moscow

== Spain ==
- BCN Mes, Barcelona (alt weekly format published monthly in paper, more frequently online)
- Diagonal Periódico, Madrid (biweekly)

== United States ==
=== Alabama ===
- Lagniappe, Mobile (weekly)

=== Alaska ===
- Anchorage Press, Anchorage

=== Arizona ===
- Phoenix New Times, Phoenix
- Tucson Weekly, Tucson

=== Arkansas ===
- Arkansas Times, Little Rock

=== California ===
- Chico News & Review, Chico
- East Bay Express, Oakland
- Easy Reader, Hermosa Beach
- Good Times, Santa Cruz
- LA Weekly, Los Angeles
- Metro Silicon Valley, San Jose
- Monterey County Weekly, Seaside
- New Times (weekly), San Luis Obispo, owned by the New Times Media Group
- North Bay Bohemian, Sonoma, Marin, and Napa Counties
- North Coast Journal, Humboldt County
- Pacific Sun, Marin County
- Palo Alto Weekly, Palo Alto
- Pasadena Weekly, Pasadena
- Sacramento News & Review, Sacramento
- San Diego Reader, San Diego
- San Francisco Bay Guardian, San Francisco
- Santa Barbara Independent, Santa Barbara
- Santa Maria Sun, Santa Maria, owned by the New Times Media Group
- SF Weekly, San Francisco
- Ventura County Reporter, Ventura County

=== Colorado ===
- Boulder Weekly, Boulder
- Colorado Springs Independent, Colorado Springs
- Westword, Denver

=== District of Columbia ===
- Washington City Paper, Washington,

=== Florida ===
- Creative Loafing Tampa, Tampa,
- Folio Weekly, Jacksonville,
- Miami New Times, Miami, owned by the New Times Media chain,
- New Times Broward-Palm Beach, Ft. Lauderdale, owned by the New Times Media chain,
- Orlando Weekly, Orlando,

=== Georgia ===
- The 11th Hour, Macon (biweekly),
- Connect Savannah, Savannah,
- Creative Loafing Atlanta, Atlanta,
- Flagpole Magazine, Athens,

=== Hawaii ===
- Maui Time Weekly, Maui,

=== Idaho ===
- Boise Weekly, Boise,

=== Illinois ===
- Chicago Reader, Chicago,
- Illinois Times, Springfield,
- Newcity, Chicago,
- The Rock River Times, Rockford,

=== Indiana ===
- Nuvo Newsweekly, Indianapolis,

=== Iowa ===
- Cityview, Des Moines,
- Juice, Des Moines,
- Little Village, Iowa
- River Cities' Reader, Davenport,

=== Kansas ===
- The Pitch, Kansas City, (monthly)

=== Kentucky ===
- Louisville Eccentric Observer, Louisville,

=== Louisiana ===
- Gambit, New Orleans,

=== Maine ===
- The Maine Edge, Bangor,

=== Massachusetts ===
- Valley Advocate, Northampton
- Worcester Magazine, Worcester

=== Michigan ===
- City Pulse, Lansing,
- Metro Times, Detroit,
- Northern Express, Traverse City,

=== Mississippi ===
- The Jackson Free Press, Jackson,

=== Missouri ===
- The Pitch, Kansas City, (monthly),

=== Montana ===
- Missoula Independent, Missoula,

=== Nevada ===
- Las Vegas Weekly, Las Vegas,
- Reno News & Review, Reno

=== New Hampshire ===
- The New Hampshire Gazette, Portsmouth,

=== New Jersey ===
- The Aquarian Weekly, North Jersey,
- Atlantic City Weekly, Atlantic City,
- TAPinto, formerly The Alternative Press, hyperlocal digital news,

=== New Mexico ===
- Santa Fe Reporter, Santa Fe,
- Weekly Alibi, Albuquerque,

=== New York ===
- Artvoice, Buffalo,
- The Beast, Buffalo,
- City Newspaper, Rochester,
- Long Island Press, Long Island,
- Metroland, Albany
- TAPinto, hyperlocal digital news in Putnam County,
- Village Voice

=== North Carolina ===
- Creative Loafing Charlotte, Charlotte, 1972–present
- Indy Week, Durham, 1983–present
- Mountain Xpress, Asheville, 1994–present
- Yes! Weekly, Greensboro, 2005–present
- Triad City Beat, Greensboro, 2014–present

=== North Dakota ===
- High Plains Reader, Fargo,

=== Ohio ===
- Active Dayton, Dayton,
- Cincinnati CityBeat, Cincinnati,
- Cleveland Scene, Cleveland,
- The Other Paper, Columbus,
- Toledo City Paper, Toledo,
- Toledo Free Press, Toledo,

=== Oklahoma ===
- Oklahoma Gazette, Oklahoma City metropolitan area,

=== Oregon ===
- Eugene Weekly, Eugene,
- The Portland Mercury, Portland,
- Willamette Week, Portland,
- The Source Weekly, Bend,

=== Pennsylvania ===
- Erie Reader, Erie,
- Philadelphia Weekly, Philadelphia,
- Pittsburgh City Paper, Pittsburgh,
- The Weekender, Wilkes-Barre,
- The Weekly Recorder, Washington,

=== Rhode Island ===
- Mothers News, Providence, 2010–present
- Providence Phoenix, Providence, 1968-2014
- The College Hill Independent, Providence, 1990–present

=== South Carolina ===
- Charleston City Paper, Charleston,
- Columbia City Paper, Columbia,
- Free Times, Columbia,

=== Tennessee ===
- Memphis Flyer, Memphis,
- Murfreesboro Pulse, Murfreesboro,
- Nashville Scene, Nashville,

=== Texas ===
- The Austin Chronicle, Austin
- Dallas Observer, Dallas
- Fort Worth Weekly, Fort Worth
- Houston Press, Houston
- San Antonio Current, San Antonio
- What's Up, El Paso

=== Utah ===
- Salt Lake City Weekly, Salt Lake City,

=== Vermont ===
- Seven Days, Burlington,

=== Virginia ===
- C-Ville Weekly, Charlottesville,
- Style Weekly, Richmond,

=== Washington ===
- The Comet, Wenatchee
- The Inlander, Spokane,
- Seattle Weekly, Seattle,
- The Stranger, Seattle,
- Tacoma Weekly, Tacoma,
- Weekly Volcano, Tacoma and Olympia,

=== Wisconsin ===
- Isthmus, Madison,
- The Second Supper, La Crosse,
- Shepherd Express, Milwaukee

== Defunct alternative weeklies ==
- Amsterdam Weekly, Amsterdam, Netherlands
- Baltimore City Paper, Baltimore, Maryland
- Bugle, Milwaukee, Wisconsin (1970–1978)
- Cascadia Weekly, Bellingham, Washington
- City Pages, Minneapolis and Saint Paul, Minnesota
- Cleveland Free Times, Cleveland, Ohio (merged with Cleveland Scene)
- Columbus Alive, Columbus, Ohio
- Dayton City Paper, Dayton, Ohio
- DigBoston, Boston, Massachusetts
- Echo Weekly, Waterloo Region, Canada (1997–2011)
- FFWD, Calgary, (ended March 5, 2015)
- Free Press Houston, Houston, Texas (2003-2018)
- The Great Speckled Bird, Atlanta, Georgia
- Hartford Advocate, Hartford, Connecticut
- Helix, Seattle, Washington (1967–1970)
- Honolulu Weekly, Honolulu, Hawaii (ended June 2013)
- Hour Community, Montreal (ended May 2012)
- Hundred Flowers, Minneapolis, Minnesota (1970–1972)
- Ici Montréal, Montreal (ended April 2009)
- Knoxville Voice, Knoxville, Tennessee (2006-2009)
- LA CityBeat, Los Angeles, California
- Las Vegas CityLife, Las Vegas, Nevada
- Los Angeles Reader, Los Angeles, California
- Metro Spirit, Augusta, Georgia
- Missoula Independent, Missoula, Montana, (1991-2018)
- Montreal Mirror, Montreal (ended June 2012)
- New Hampshire Free Press, Keene, New Hampshire
- New Haven Advocate, New Haven, Connecticut
- New Times LA, Los Angeles, California
- The Noise, Flagstaff, Arizona (1993-2017)
- North Carolina Anvil, Durham, North Carolina
- OC Weekly, Orange County
- Ottawa XPress, Ottawa (ended May 2012)
- Philadelphia City Paper, Philadelphia, Pennsylvania
- Planet Jackson Hole, Jackson, Wyoming
- Port Folio Weekly, Norfolk, Virginia
- Portland Phoenix, Portland, Maine
- Pulse Niagara, St. Catharines, Ontario
- Real Detroit Weekly, Detroit, Michigan
- The Riverfront Times, St. Louis, Missouri (1977-2024)
- Salem Weekly, Salem, Oregon
- San Diego CityBeat, San Diego
- Seattle Sun, Seattle, Washington (1974–1982)
- See Magazine, Edmonton (ended 2011)
- Syracuse New Times, Syracuse, New York
- Urban Tulsa Weekly, Tulsa, Oklahoma and surrounding areas (1991–2013)
- The Real Paper, Cambridge, Massachusetts (1972–1981)
- The Vancouver Voice, Vancouver, Washington (ended 2011)
- The Valley Beat, Allentown, Pennsylvania (ended 2015)

== Defunct alternative biweekly or monthly newspapers ==
- Toronto Clarion, 1976–1985, Ontario, Canada
