= City Paper =

City Paper may refer to:

- The City Paper also known as The Nashville City Paper
- Baltimore City Paper
- Charleston City Paper
- Columbia City Paper
- Dayton City Paper
- Philadelphia City Paper
- Pittsburgh City Paper
- Toledo City Paper
- Washington City Paper

== See also ==
- City News (disambiguation)
- City Journal
- Tha City Paper, an American rapper
