= Timeline of Columbia, South Carolina =

History of Columbia

The following is a timeline of the history of the city of Columbia, South Carolina, USA.

== 18th-19th centuries ==
- 1786 - Columbia established as state capital (previously located in Charleston).
- 1788 - Columbia becomes part of the new US state of South Carolina.
- 1795 - First Presbyterian Church congregation founded.
- 1797 - Commission of Streets and Markets established.
- 1801 - University of South Carolina was founded
- 1803 - Washington Street Methodist builds the first church building in Columbia
- 1804 - Columbia Library Society founded.
- 1805
  - Town chartered.
  - John Taylor elected intendant (town leader).
  - South Carolina College opens.
- 1809 - First Baptist Church founded.
- 1813 - Trinity Episcopal Church founded.
- 1814 - State Legislative Library established.
- 1824 - St. Peter's Roman Catholic Church built.
- 1825 - March: Lafayette visits town.
- 1828 - South Carolina Female Collegiate Institute founded.
- 1830
  - Columbia Theological Seminary active.
  - Population: 3,310.
- 1838 - Southern Chronicle newspaper begins publication.
- 1840 - Population: 4,340.
- 1842
  - Railroad (Branchville-Columbia) begins operating.
  - Arsenal Military Academy (the Citadel) established.
- 1846 - J.T. Zealy daguerreotypist in business.
- 1847 - Southern Presbyterian Review begins publication.
- 1850
  - Carolina Times newspaper begins publication.
  - Population: 6,060.
- 1852 - Charlotte-Columbia railway begins operating.
- 1853
  - Greenville-Columbia railway begins operating.
  - First Presbyterian Church building constructed.
- 1854 - Office of mayor established.
- 1856
  - Town police force and Athenaeum established.
  - South Carolina State Fair begins.
- 1857
  - Trinity Episcopal Cathedral building consecrated.
  - Southern Guardian newspaper begins publication.
- 1865
  - February 17–18: Union forces in power; city burned.
  - The Phoenix newspaper begins publication.
- 1869 - South Carolina State House built.
- 1870
  - Benedict College founded.
  - Area of city expands.
- 1871 - October: "Southern States Convention of Colored Men" held in Columbia.
- 1874 - State normal school opens.
- 1875 - US Court House built.
- 1880 - Population: 10,036.
- 1891 - The State newspaper begins publication.
- 1892 - Columbia Hospital established.
- 1893 - Sidney Park Colored Methodist Episcopal Church built.
- 1895 - Columbia Duck Mill begins operating.
- 1896 - South Carolina Confederate Relic Room and Museum established.
- 1897 - Columbia Record newspaper begins publication.
- 1899 - Olympia Mill built.

== 20th century ==
- 1908 - Main Street paved.
- 1913
  - National Corn Show held in city.
  - Palmetto Building constructed.
- 1917 - Military Camp Jackson established.
- 1920 - Population: 37,524.
- 1921 - Bethel A.M.E. Church built.
- 1922 - February: Trolley strike.
- 1924 - Town Theatre built.
- 1925 - Part of North Columbia annexed to city.
- 1926-7 - Capital Heights, Hollywood, Kilbourne Park, Rose Hill, and Rosewood annexed to city.
- 1930
  - Dreher Shoals Dam begins operating.
  - WIS radio begins broadcasting.
  - Belk's department store in business.
- 1931 - Carolina Theatre opens.
- 1932 - Thomas Woodrow Wilson Boyhood Home (museum) opens.
- 1934 - Richland County Public Library established.
- 1937
  - US Courthouse becomes Columbia City Hall.
  - Palmetto Theater opens.
  - University South Caroliniana Society founded.
- 1939
  - WCOS radio begins broadcasting.
  - Municipal Association of South Carolina headquartered in Columbia.
- 1940
  - Lexington County Airport built.
  - US military Fort Jackson active.
  - Population: 62,396.
- 1941 - Carver Theatre built.
- 1950
  - Columbia Museum of Art and Twilite Drive-In cinema open.
  - Population: 86,914.
- 1953 - WIS-TV and WNOK-TV (television) begin broadcasting.
- 1958 - Lester Bates becomes mayor.
- 1960 - South Carolina Department of Corrections headquartered in city.
- 1961
  - Richland Mall in business.
  - Historic Columbia Foundation established.
- 1963 - Columbia Festival Orchestra founded.
- 1966 - Hammond School founded.
- 1968 - University of South Carolina's Carolina Coliseum opens.
- 1970
  - Dutch Square shopping mall in business.
  - John Tucker Campbell becomes mayor.
  - Population: 112,542.
- 1974
  - Riverbanks Zoo opens.
  - Shambhala Center founded.
- 1976 - WLTR radio begins broadcasting.
- 1977 - Palmetto Alliance (antinuclear group) founded.
- 1978 - Kirkman Finlay becomes mayor.
- 1979
  - Masjid as-Salaam (Muslim center) built.
  - Nickelodeon Theater opens.
  - Columbia becomes part of Tree City USA.
- 1980 - South Carolina Military Museum established.
- 1981 - Harvest Hope Food Bank established.
- 1983 - Chicora Foundation (historic preservation group) established.
- 1984 - Hindu Temple built.
- 1986 - T. Patton Adams becomes mayor.
- 1987 - AT&T Building constructed.
- 1988
  - South Carolina State Museum opens in the former location of the vacant Columbia Mills Building.
  - University of South Carolina's Koger Center for the Arts built.
- 1990
  - Bob Coble becomes mayor.
  - Population: 98,052.
- 1991 - Sidney Park opens.
- 1992 - Masjid Al-Muslimiin (mosque) built.
- 1993
  - Richland County Public Library new main branch building opens.
  - Jim Clyburn becomes U.S. representative for South Carolina's 6th congressional district.
- 1994 - Sikh Religious Society founded.
- 1996 - City website online.
- 2000 - January 17: Confederate flag protest.

== 21st century ==
- 2001 - Columbia Zen Buddhist Priory founded.
- 2002
  - Colonial Center (arena) opens.
  - Central Midlands Regional Transit Authority and Ganden Mahayana Buddhist established.
- 2005 - Columbia City Paper begins publication.
- 2007 - Columbia Quadsquad (rollerderby league) formed.
- 2009 - Fort Jackson National Cemetery established.
- 2010
  - Stephen K. Benjamin becomes first African-American in city elected mayor.
  - Population: 129,272 city; 767,598 metro.
- 2012 - Royster Guano Superfund site cleared of arsenic contamination.

== See also ==
- Columbia history
- List of mayors of Columbia, South Carolina
- National Register of Historic Places listings in Columbia, South Carolina
- List of museums in Columbia, South Carolina
- Timeline of South Carolina
- Timeline of Charleston, South Carolina

== Bibliography ==
- Columbia City Directory. J.T. Hershman. 1859 – via University of South Carolina.
- R.H. Long (1863), "Columbia", Hunt's Gazetteer of the Border and Southern States, Pittsburgh, Pa.: John P. Hunt
- Walsh's Columbia South Carolina City Directory. 1907.
- Federal Writers' Project (1941), "Columbia", South Carolina: a Guide to the Palmetto State, American Guide Series, Boston: Houghton Mifflin, pp. 212–236, hdl:2027/mdp.39015008031521. + Chronology
- Mary Fulton Green (1969). "Profile of Columbia in 1850". South Carolina Historical Magazine. 70 (2): 104–121. JSTOR 27566933.
- John Hammond Moore (1993). Columbia and Richland County: A South Carolina Community, 1740-1990. University of South Carolina Press. ISBN 978-0-87249-827-3.
- Vennie Deas-Moore (2000). Columbia, South Carolina. Black America. Arcadia.
- Columbia Planning Department (2008). "Comprehensive Plan for Columbia, South Carolina: 2008-2018". City of Columbia, South Carolina.
