= What's Up, Doc? =

What's Up, Doc? may refer to:

== Uses related to Bugs Bunny ==
- "What's up, doc?", a catchphrase used by Bugs Bunny
- What's Up, Doc? (1950 film), an animated cartoon short
- What's Up Doc? (Australian TV series), a 1990s children's program featuring Looney Tunes cartoons
- What's Up Doc? (British TV series), a 1990s Saturday-morning children's program featuring Looney Tunes cartoons

== Other film and television ==
- What's Up, Doc? (1972 film), a screwball comedy film starring Barbra Streisand and Ryan O'Neal
- "What's Up, Doc?" (Cheers), an episode
- "What's Up Doc?", an episode of Family Matters
- "What's Up, Doc?", an episode of M*A*S*H

== Other uses ==
- "What's Up Doc? (Can We Rock)", a song by Fu-Schnickens, featuring Shaquille O'Neal
- What's Up Doc?, a 2010 book by Hilary Jones

== See also ==
- What's up (disambiguation)
