= Dynasty Communication =

Canadian newspaper publisher

Dynasty Communications was a publisher of three alternative weekly newspapers in Ontario, Canada. These publications served the Kitchener, Hamilton and Niagara areas.

Dynasty Communications was started in 1995 by Brian Matthews, Sean Rosen, Ronald Kilpatrick and Marcus Rosen. The first issue of View Magazine (Hamilton) published on the 1st Thursday of January 1995. In July 1996, the company purchased Pulse Niagara, a struggling biweekly. It was revamped and overhauled. The result was a new weekly full colour alternative paper. In 2010, Pulse Niagara merged into its Hamilton sister publication View. In September 1997, the company launched Echo Weekly to service the Kitchener, Waterloo, and Guelph areas.

The company is now closed.

== Publications ==
- Echo Weekly - served the Kitchener, Waterloo, Cambridge and Guelph areas
- View Magazine - served the Greater Hamilton and Niagara, Ontario area (Ancaster, Burlington, Stoney Creek, Glanbrook, Dundas, Flamborough, and Hamilton - St. Catharines, Welland, Niagara-on-the-Lake, Niagara Falls and Fort Erie)
