= Echo Weekly =

Newspaper in Canada

- Type: Weekly newspaper
- Format: tabloid
- Owner: Dynasty Communication Inc
- Editor: Ron Kilpatrick
- Founded: 1997; 28 years ago
- Ceased publication: October 2011; 14 years ago
- Headquarters: Kitchener, Ontario
- Website: Echo Weekly

Echo Weekly was an alternative weekly newspaper serving the Kitchener, Waterloo, Cambridge, and Guelph areas in Ontario, Canada. Up until January 2008 Its offices were located in downtown Kitchener but were moved to downtown Guelph.

It was published by Dynasty Communication Inc of Hamilton, Ontario. Dynasty also publishes similar papers in Hamilton (View Magazine) and the Niagara Region (Pulse Niagara).

== History ==
Echo started publishing in September 1997 by Sean Rosen, Ron Kilpatrick and Marcus Rosen. It served the 18- to 35-year-old market. Echo was published every Thursday and distributed +55,000 free copies to more than 470 locations throughout the greater Kitchener-Waterloo, Cambridge, Fergus, Elora and Guelph area.

Echo stopped publishing in October 2011.

== Masthead ==
- Publisher: Ron Kilpatrick
- Editor-in-Chief: Ryan Farkas
- Editorial Assistant: Alexandra Bates
- Advertising Sales Manager: Sean Rosen
- Advertising Representative: Chris Rego
- Classifieds: Liz Kay

== See also ==
- List of newspapers in Canada
