= City News =

City News might refer to one of the following:

- City News (film), 1984
- CityNews, news and current affairs programming on the Citytv network in Canada
  - CityNews Channel, defunct news channel
- Citynews (Italy), newspaper group
- City News Bureau of Chicago, a former news bureau
- City News Service, a regional news service covering Southern California

== See also ==
- City Paper (disambiguation)
- Business news
- City Journal
- City Newspaper
