= Toronto Clarion =

Alternative newspaper published in Toronto, Canada from 1976 to 1985

- Owner(s): Western Gap Communications Cooperative Ltd. (initially), Toronto Clarion Publishing Ltd. (later)
- Launched: October 15, 1976; 49 years ago
- Ceased publication: 1985; 41 years ago
- Language: English
- Headquarters: 73 Bathurst Street
- City: Toronto
- Country: Canada
- ISSN: 0229-3196
- OCLC number: 1080767530
- Website: https://connexions.org/CxArchive/TorontoClarion/TorontoClarion-Index.htm

The Toronto Clarion was an alternative newspaper published in Toronto, Ontario, Canada from 1976 to 1985. It was published initially by Western Gap Communications Cooperative Ltd. and later by Toronto Clarion Publishing Ltd. The Clarion was a tabloid sized biweekly newspaper until 1980, when it changed to monthly publication.

== History ==
At its founding it was reported that the Clarion would “give an insight into news the three major dailies in the city either gloss over, distort or completely ignore”. The newspaper was dubbed “politically independent”, "progressive", and "a gutsy little crusader". Founders included Marilyn Burnett, Buzz Burza, Gerry Dunn, Francis Fuca, Virginia Smith, and Ken Wyman.

Feature articles ranged from social topics such as local feminist activities, rent control, city planning, and food cooperatives, to issues such as unionization, boycotts, and censorship. Entertainment items such as restaurant and music reviews also appeared regularly.

The Clarion was sold for 10 cents initially, and distributed primarily through its street newspaper boxes. It was supported by Clarion Typesetting, subscribers, donors, fundraising events, and advertising. Important decisions were made by a majority vote of the members of the cooperative.

Writers, editors, cartoonists, typesetters and photographers for the Toronto Clarion include:

- Ann Hansen
- Karolyn Kendrick
- Ulli Diemer
- Oscar Rogers
- Thomas Walkom
- Paul Weinberg
- Robin Wood

Some writers for the Clarion began their writing careers for the Canadian University Press and continued to work in journalism. Some were community journalists. Articles and photos initially published in the Clarion have been cited in other publications, or reprinted in books.

== See also ==
- List of alternative newspapers

Scroll down to heading "Defunct biweekly or monthly newspapers"
