= Santa Maria Sun =

Weekly newspaper in Santa Maria, CA, US

- Type: Alternative weekly
- Format: Broadsheet
- Owner: News Time Media Group
- Founder: Steve Moss
- Editor: Camillia Lanham
- Founded: 2000
- Language: English
- Headquarters: Santa Maria, California
- Circulation: 12,000 (as of 2023)
- Sister newspapers: New Times
- Website: santamariasun.com

The Santa Maria Sun is an American free weekly newspaper that serves Santa Maria, California and Santa Barbara County. Edited by Camillia Lanham, it is published on Thursdays.

== History ==
In 2000, Steve Moss, owner of the New Times San Luis Obispo, founded the Santa Maria Sun.

In 2001, Lompoc, California Economic Development Committee member Justin Ruhge contributed a controversial editorial to the Nov. 16 issue. It stated that "Muslims are out to destroy our world."

In 2005, Moss died. For fifteen years, Ryan Miller edited the Sun. During the 2005 Michael Jackson trial in Santa Maria, Miller provided local commentary for national and international news outlets. Miller left the Sun in 2015.

== Awards ==
In 2013, the Sun won an award for its investigation of a corrections officer's death at the Federal Correctional Institution, Lompoc. The Sun uncovered a pattern of administrative malfeasance and abuse that may have contributed to the death of two corrections officers.
