= What's Up =

What's Up or variants may refer to:

== Film and television ==
- What'z Up?, 1994 American teens TV show
- What's Up (TV series), 2011–12 South Korean musical drama
- What's Up! Que Pasa, American children's educational TV show
- WatsUp TV, pan-African series of TV shows
- Whassup?, advertising campaign for Budweiser-brand beer
- What's Up: Balloon to the Rescue, mockbuster by Vídeo Brinquedo

== Music ==
- What's Up? (musical), Lerner and Loewe musical

=== Albums ===
- What's Up (Bill Hardman album), 1989
- What's Up? (Michel Camilo album), 2013
- What's Up?, an album by Klaus "Major" Heuser Band, 2016

=== Songs ===
- "What's Up?" (4 Non Blondes song), 1992
- "What's Up" (Myname song), 2012
- "Wassup", by Joey Valence & Brae featuring JPEGMafia, 2025
- "What Up?", by Pimp C from his 2010 album The Naked Soul of Sweet Jones

=== Groups ===
- Wassup (group), South Korean girl group
- What's Up!, Swedish boy band

== Other uses ==
- What's Up (weekly), newspaper in El Paso, Texas

== See also ==
- Wazzup Wazzup, Philippine comedic-news TV series
- WhatsApp, instant messaging application for smartphones
