= The Journal (South Carolina) =

Newspaper in Seneca

- Type: Daily newspaper
- Format: Broadsheet
- Owner: The Edwards Group
- Editor: Jerry Edwards
- Founded: 1903
- Headquarters: 210 W. North 1st St; Seneca, South Carolina 29678 United States
- Website: upstatetoday.com

The Journal is a newspaper published in Seneca, South Carolina that publishes five editions a week. It is produced in digital "e-Editions" Tuesday through Saturday, with print editions on Wednesday and Saturday. It serves the western portion of upstate South Carolina, including the communities of Seneca, Walhalla, Westminster, Salem, Central, and Clemson. The newspaper was founded in 1904.

== Awards ==
The Journal has won the South Carolina Press Association's First Place Award for General Excellence five times. In 2023, it won the association's top award for overall advertising among the state's daily newspapers.

== Controversies ==
=== Racial Insensitivity ===
In June 2020, The Journal faced a backlash after publishing an editorial cartoon that some readers said was racially insensitive. The cartoon by Al Goodwyn depicted a woman labeled "Black Community" explaining why she could leave her husband, who was shown on a couch and portrayed as a donkey to represent the Democratic Party. The woman says, "I can't leave him. We've been together for decades... Plus, he says we'd never survive on our own."

The Journal issued a public apology that said the cartoon did not get proper review because editors were busy covering an election and that they would not run any more cartoons by Goodwyn. "We're sorry. Sometimes there's almost nothing else to say," the newspaper's apology said. "As a newspaper, we are supposed to be a reflection of our community—one community—Not a white community, or a black one, one community. We failed in that Wednesday, miserably. We painted a painful reminder of the division we all feel right now." The Oconee County Council subsequently voted to sever advertising ties with the newspaper, citing concerns over bias and racism. That ended all county ads except legally required notices and redirected the funds to cultural diversity training for law enforcement.

Goodwyn gave a statement to the Daily Cartoonist that acknowledged the complaints. "My intent in the cartoon was to project the Democrat party lacking in care and effective measures, yet continuing to be supported. I stand by that intended message. I’ve had emails from those offended which have allowed me to have lengthy, respectful conversations with them on the cartoon’s subject. Those conversations have given me a feel for the elements of the cartoon that were offensive and I’ll take that lesson into future cartoons."

== See also ==
- List of newspapers in South Carolina
