= List of newspapers in South Carolina =

This is a list of newspapers in South Carolina, United States.

== Current news publications ==
The following is a list of current (print and web-based) news publications published in the U.S. state of South Carolina.

Title	Locale	Year est.	Frequency	Publisher/parent company	Notes
Advertizer-Herald	Bamberg, S.C.	1972	Weekly	Trib Publications	Result of merger of The Advertizer and the Bamberg Herald. Stopped publishing in 2020.
Aiken Leader	Wagener, S.C.		Weekly	Andrew O'Byrne Sr.	
Aiken Standard	Aiken, S.C.			Post and Courier	Major paper
Anderson Observer	Anderson, S.C.		Daily		
Bamberg County Leader	Bamberg, S.C.		Weekly	Andrew O'Byrne Sr.	
Beaufort Gazette	Beaufort, S.C.			McClatchy Company	Major paper
Berkeley Independent	Moncks Corner, S.C.		Weekly		
The Berkeley Observer	Goose Creek, S.C.		Daily		
Calhoun Times Leader	St. Matthews, S.C.		Weekly	Andrew O'Byrne Sr.	
Chapin Times	Chapin, S.C.		Weekly		
The Charleston Chronicle	Charleston, S.C.	1971	Weekly	Tolbert Smalls	Major African-American newspaper
Charleston City Paper	Charleston, S.C.		Weekly		Major paper
Charleston Sentinel	Charleston, S.C.	2025	Weekly	Independent	
Cheraw Chronicle	Cheraw, S.C.		Weekly		
Chronicle-Independent	Camden, South Carolina		Weekly		
Clinton Chronicle	Clinton, S.C.		Weekly		
Coastal Observer	Pawleys Island, S.C.		Weekly		
Colletonian	Walterboro,, S.C.		Weekly		Ceased publication
Columbia City Paper	Columbia, S.C.				Major paper
Daily King News	Hilton Head Island, S.C.				
Dillon Herald	Dillon, S.C.		Weekly		
Dorchester Eagle-Record	St. George, S.C.		Weekly		Ceased publication in early 2026
Dorchester Leader	St. George, S.C.		Weekly	Andrew O'Byrne Sr.	
Edgefield Advertiser	Edgefield, S.C.		Weekly		
El Palmetto	Columbia, S.C.		Daily		
Free Times	Columbia, S.C.		Weekly		Serving Columbia, and Richland and Lexington counties
Georgetown Times	Georgetown, S.C.				
Greenville Journal	Greenville, S.C.		Weekly		
Greenville News	Greenville, S.C.			USA Today Co.	Major paper
Hampton County Guardian	Hampton, S.C.		Weekly		
Herald-Journal	Spartanburg, S.C.			USA Today Co.	Major paper
Holly Hill Observer	Holly Hill, S.C.		Weekly	Trib Publications	Closed in 2020
Horry Independent	Conway, S.C.		Weekly		
Independent-Mail	Anderson, S.C.			USA Today Co.	Major paper
Index-Journal	Greenwood, S.C.				Major paper
Island Packet	Hilton Head Island, S.C.			McClatchy Company	Major paper
The Item	Sumter, S.C.				Major paper
Jasper County Sun	Ridgeland, S.C.		Weekly		
The Journal	Seneca, S.C.	1903	Daily (5 times per week, Tues-Sat)	Edwards Group (locally owned)	Major paper
Lake City News & Post	Lake City, S.C.		Weekly		
Lancaster News	Lancaster, S.C.		Three times weekly		
Laurens County Advertiser	Laurens, S.C.		Weekly		
Lee County Observer	Bishopville, S.C.		Weekly		
Marion Star & Mullins Enterprise	Marion, S.C.		Weekly	Lee Enterprises	
Marlboro Herald Advocate	Bennettsville, S.C.		Weekly		
McCormick Messenger	McCormick, S.C.		Weekly		
Morning News	Florence, S.C.		Daily	Lee Enterprises	Major paper
Myrtle Beach Herald	Myrtle Beach, S.C.		Weekly		
Newberry Observer	Newberry, S.C.		Weekly		
News	Kingstree, S.C.		Weekly		
News and Press	Darlington, S.C.		Weekly		
News & Reporter	Chester, S.C.		Twice weekly		
North Myrtle Beach Times	North Myrtle Beach, S.C.		Weekly		
Orangeburg Leader	Santee/Holly Hill, S.C.		Weekly	Andrew O'Byrne Sr.	
The Post and Courier	Charleston, S.C.	1803			Major paper. Charleston Courier began in 1803; became Post and Courier in 1991
Press and Banner and Abbeville Medium	Abbeville, S.C.	1844	Weekly	Banner Corporation	Original website (archived ver.)
Press and Standard	Walterboro, S.C.		Weekly		Colleton County
Progressive Journal	Pageland, S.C.		Weekly		
Rock Hill Herald	Rock Hill, S.C.			McClatchy Company	Major paper
Santee Striper	Santee, S.C.		Weekly	Trib Publications	Closed in 2020
The State	Columbia, S.C.	1891	Daily	McClatchy Company	Major paper. Service area includes Columbia, Richland County, Lexington County, and the Midlands.
Summerville Journal-Scene	Summerville, S.C.		Twice weekly		Dorchester County
Sun News	Myrtle Beach, S.C.		Daily	McClatchy Company	Major paper
Times and Democrat	Orangeburg, S.C.		Daily online, print on Tue. Thur. and Sat.	Lee Enterprises	Major paper
The Twin-City News	Batesburg-Leesville, S.C.	1925	Weekly	Bruner Press	Weekly newspaper covering western Midlands, including Lexington and Saluda counties
Union County News	Union, S.C.		Weekly		
Union Daily Times	Union, S.C.				
Weekly Observer	Hemingway, S.C.		Weekly		Ceased publication

== Defunct ==
Title	Locale	Year est.	Frequency	Year ceased	Notes
Abbeville Medium	Abbeville	1871		1923	
Abbeville Press	Abbeville	1860		1869	
Advertizer	Bamberg	1967		1972	Merged with the Bamberg Herald
Anderson Gazette	Anderson	1843		1854	
Bamberg Herald	Bamberg	1891		1972	Merged with The Advertizer
Charleston Mercury	Charleston	1819		1868	
Citizen-News	Edgefield			2012	
Columbia Record	Columbia	1897		1988	
Community Times-Dispatch	Walterboro				
Deutsche Zeitung	Charleston	1853		1917	
Evening Medium	Abbeville	1923		1925	
Gazette and Advocate	Anderson	1855		185?	
The Greenville Piedmont	Greenville				
Greer Citizen	Greer	1918	Weekly	2024	
The Hampton County Herald	Hampton	1916			Founded by Randolph Murdaugh Sr.
Herald and News	Newberry	1903		1937	
Highland Sentinel	Calhoun	1840		1843	
Lake Wylie Pilot	Lake Wylie			2016 (Dec)	
North Trade Journal	North				
Press and Banner	Abbeville	1924		1925	
Southern Rights Advocate	Anderson	1852		185?	

== 18th century ==
=== Charleston ===
Newspapers published in Charleston, South Carolina:

- The Charleston Evening Gazette. D., T.W., July 11, 1785- Oct. 18, 1786
- The Charleston Morning Post, and Daily Advertiser. D., Jan. 18, 1786-Nov. 5, 1787
- Charlestown Gazette. W., Aug. (?), 1778-Jan. 18, 1780
- The Chronicle of Liberty, or, the Republican Intelligencer. W., Mar. 25, 1783
- The City Gazette & Daily Advertiser. D., Jan. 2, 1792- Dec. 31, 1800+
- The City Gazette, and the Daily Advertiser. D., Nov. 6- Dec. 17, 1787
- The City Gazette or, the Daily Advertiser. D., Dec. 18, 1787-Jan. 1, 1792

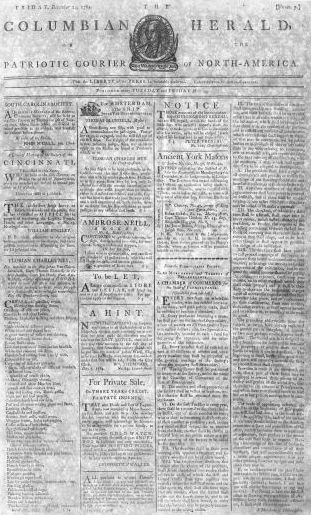
Columbian Herald, 1784

- The Columbian Herald & Daily Advertiser. T.W., Sept. 1792- 1793 (?)
- Columbian Herald, and the General Advertiser. T.W., 1792 (?)-July 25 (?), 1793
- The Columbian Herald, or, the Independent Courier of North-America. S.W., T.W., Nov. 24, 1785-sometime after June 28, 1791
- Columbian Herald, or the New Daily Advertiser. D., Oct. 3, 1795-Dec. 17, 1796
- The Columbian Herald, or, the Patriotic Courier of North- America. S.W., Nov. 23, 1784-Nov. 21, 1785
- Columbian Herald, or, the Southern Star. T.W., July 27, 1793-September (?), 1795
- The Daily Evening Gazette and Charleston Tea-Table Companion. D., Jan. 3, 1795-Feb. 18, 1795
- Evening Vesper Courier. S.W., July 31-Nov. 16, 1798
- Federal Carolina Gazette. W., Jan. 2 (?)-Dec. 25, 1800
- The Gazette of the State of South-Carolina. W., S.W., Apr. 9, 1777-Mar. 24, 1785
- The Royal Gazette. S.W. Mar. 3, 1781-Sept. 28, 1782
- The Royal South-Carolina Gazette. T.W., S.W., June 1 (?), 1780-Sept. 12, 1782
- The South-Carolina and American General Gazette. W., S.W., Apr. 4, 1764-Feb. 28, 1781
- The South Carolina Gazette. W., Jan. 8, 1732-Dec. 18, 1775
- South-Carolina Gazette, and Country Journal. W., Dec. 31, 1765-Aug. 1, 1775

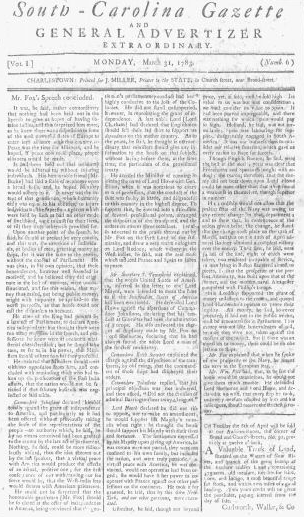
South-Carolina Gazette and General Advertiser, 1783

- South-Carolina Gazette, and General Advertiser. S.W., T.W., Mar. 15, 1783-Oct. 23, 1784
- The South-Carolina Gazette, and Public Advertiser. S.W., Mar. 3, 1784-July 9, 1785
- The South-Carolina Gazette, and the General Advertiser. S.W., Jan. 7-14, 1786
- The South-Carolina Gazette and the Public Advertiser. T.W., S.W., July 12, 1785-Jan. 4, 1786
- South Carolina State Gazette and Daily Advertiser. D., Nov. 30, 1784-July 26, 1785
- South Carolina State Gazette, and General Advertiser. T.W., Oct. 26-Nov. 27, 1784
- South-Carolina State-Gazette & Timothy & Mason's Daily Advertiser. D., Jan. 1, 1794-Dec. 31, 1797
- South-Carolina State Gazette, and Timmothy's Daily Advertiser. D., Jan. 1, 1798-Dec., 31, 1800+
- The South-Carolina Gazetteer, and Country Journal. W., Dec. 17-24, 1765
- The South-Carolina Weekly Advertiser. W., Feb. 19-Apr. 23, 1783
- The South-Carolina Weekly Gazette. W., Nov. 22 (?), 1758- Mar. 28, 1764
- South-Carolina Weekly Gazette. W., Feb. 15, 1783-Feb. 27, 1784
- The State Gazette of South-Carolina. S.W., T.W., Mar. 28, 1785-Dec. 31, 1793
- The Telegraphe, and Charleston Daily Advertiser. D., Mar. 16-20, 1795

=== Columbia ===
Newspapers published in Columbia, South Carolina:

- The Columbia Gazette. W., Jan. 28, 1794-Dec. 9, 1794
- South Carolina Gazette. W., Mar. (?), 1792-Sept. 3, 1793

=== Georgetown ===
Newspapers published in Georgetown, South Carolina:

- The South-Carolina Independent Gazette, and Georgetown Chronicle. W., Apr. 2, 1791-1796 (?)

== See also ==
- South Carolina media
  - List of newspapers in South Carolina in the 18th century
  - List of radio stations in South Carolina
  - List of television stations in South Carolina
  - Media of locales in South Carolina: Charleston, Columbia, Greenville
- Journalism:
  - Category:Journalists from South Carolina
  - University of South Carolina School of Journalism and Mass Communications, in Columbia
- South Carolina literature
U.S. newspapers

Comprehensive

- Lists of newspapers
- List of newspapers in the United States

Frequency

- List of free daily newspapers in the United States
- List of weekly newspapers in the United States

Circulation

- List of international newspapers originating in the United States
- List of national newspapers in the United States
- List of newspapers in the United States by circulation

Foreign language

- List of French-language newspapers published in the United States
- List of German-language newspapers published in the United States
- List of Spanish-language newspapers published in the United States

Specialty

- List of African-American newspapers in the United States
- List of alternative weekly newspapers in the United States
- List of business newspapers in the United States
- List of family-owned newspapers in the United States
- List of Jewish newspapers in the United States
- List of LGBTQ periodicals in the United States
- List of student newspapers in the United States
- List of supermarket tabloids in the United States
- List of underground press in the United States

Other

- List of defunct newspapers of the United States

== Bibliography ==
- William L. King (1872). Newspaper Press of Charleston, S.C.: a Chronological and Biographical History.
- S. N. D. North; United States Department of the Interior (1884). "Catalogue of Periodical Publications: South Carolina". History and Present Condition of the Newspaper and Periodical Press of the United States. Washington, D.C.: Government Printing Office. OCLC 1850475. (+ List of titles 50+ years old)
- James T. Haley, ed. (1895), "Newspapers: South Carolina", Afro-American Encyclopaedia, Nashville: Haley & Florida, hdl:2027/inu.30000029292855, OCLC 219597043
- "South Carolina". American Newspaper Directory. New York: George P. Rowell. 1900. pp. 964+. hdl:2027/umn.31951002273861a – via HathiTrust.
- "South Carolina". American Newspaper Annual & Directory. Philadelphia: N. W. Ayer & Son. 1922. pp. 907+. hdl:2027/umn.31951001295695n.
- Thomas D. Clark (1948). Southern Country Editor. Bobbs-Merrill. OCLC 525858. (Includes information about weekly rural newspapers in South Carolina)
- John Hammond Moore (1988). South Carolina Newspapers. University of South Carolina Press. ISBN 978-0-87249-567-8.
- Patricia G. McNeely. Palmetto Press: The History of South Carolina’s Newspapers and the Press Association. South Carolina Press Association, 1998.
- Erika J. Pribanic-Smith (2012). "Rhetoric of Fear: South Carolina Newspapers and the State and National Politics of 1830". Journalism History. 38. E.W. Scripps School of Journalism. ISSN 0094-7679.
