= Steve Moss (editor) =

American editor and publisher

Stephen Donnellan Moss (1948–2005) was an American editor and publisher who founded two major weekly newspapers in California's Central Coast and created the 55 Fiction short story contest.

Moss founded the New Times San Luis Obispo with Beverly Johnson and Alex Zuniga in 1986, and was its president and majority shareholder. He financed it with a few thousand dollars raised by cashing in his IRA account and borrowing from his aunt, Professor Mary Josephine Moss of San Jose State University. By 2005, the paper had a circulation of over 20,000 and revenues exceeding $1,000,000 per year. In 2002, he launched the Santa Maria Sun in the city of Santa Maria, 30 miles south. He was the majority shareholder in the publishing corporation, and majority owner and builder of the 10,000 square foot headquarters building at 505 Higuera St., San Luis Obispo.

== Education and career ==
Moss attended Ventura College and Brooks Institute of Fine Art, and graduated from the University of California, Santa Barbara, with a degree in fine art in 1975. He said he discovered his talent as a writer and editor in a UCSB class taught by Barry Farrell, west coast editor of Harper's Magazine. Farrell brought his writer friends Joan Didion and her husband John Gregory Dunne to the class, making a lasting impression. Moss and Farrell subsequently corresponded for many years, until Farrell's death.

Moss attended graduate school at Syracuse University, but left to become the editor in chief of the Syracuse New Times. When his marriage to his college sweetheart Sharon Bywater ended in 1986, he returned to his native California. Given a choice between a job in the advertising department of a large international winery in Modesto, or one as editor of a senior citizen newspaper in San Luis Obispo, he chose the latter despite the lower pay. Before long he realized that there was no entertainment weekly in the college town, and planned the successful launch of New Times.

== 55 Fiction ==
By 1987 he launched the 55 Fiction short story contest for New Times readers. The submissions had to meet strict criteria, not the least of which was that "something has to happen".

A literary work is considered 55 Fiction if it has:

1. Fifty-five words or less (a non-negotiable rule);
2. A setting;
3. One or more characters;
4. Some conflict; and
5. A resolution.

The contest was successful and popular from the beginning with New Times readers, and remains an annual event. The anthologies continue to be popular with creative writing teachers. Two anthologies of 55 Fiction have been published, 55 Fiction, The World's Shortest Stories: Murder, Love, Horror, Suspense, All This and Much More in the Most Amazing Short Stories Ever Written, Each One Just 55 Words Long and 55 Fiction, The World's Shortest Stories of Love and Death.

== Books edited ==
- 55 Fiction, The World's Shortest Stories (editor, 1995)
- 55 Fiction, The World's Shortest Stories of Love and Death (editor, 2000)
- Groaners: The Dictionary Webster Hopes To Suppress (editor, with Brandy Brandon, 1994)

== Personal life ==
Moss was born in Riverside, Calif. September 18, 1948, to Harry Walter Moss, an attorney, and Elizabeth Ann Donnellan Moss, a psychiatric social worker, both World War II veterans. He died of complications of epilepsy in his garden in San Luis Obispo on April 24, 2005. He was buried in San Luis Obispo's Old Mission Cemetery, where his headstone bears some of his cartoons.

The Steve Moss Memorial Scholarship in Journalism was founded by his family and friends to support journalism students at California Polytechnic University, San Luis Obispo. Its endowment is managed by the San Luis Obispo County Community Foundation.
