= The 11th Hour (newspaper) =

- Type: Alternative biweekly
- Format: Tabloid
- Owner(s): Brad and Megan Evans
- Publisher: Brad Evans
- Editor: Chris Horne
- Founded: 2001
- Headquarters: 484 Cherry St; Macon, GA 31201-3444; United States
- Circulation: 10,000
- Website: 11thhouronline.com

The 11th Hour News Weekly was an arts and entertainment alternative weekly published in Macon, Statesboro and Valdosta, Georgia. Beginning in Statesboro in 2001 as a newsletter on bars and nightclubs, it developed into a full-scale A&E publication, featuring leisure events in the college town. In 2003, The 11th Hour opened a main office in Macon. With its growing popularity, the newsweekly expanded distribution of the Macon version to the surrounding Middle Georgia cities of Milledgeville and Warner Robins. Valdosta's version of The 11th Hour began in 2004; its readers are students at Valdosta State University and other supporters of the South Georgia art community

== Columnists ==
11th Hour columnists include the Macon-native, columnist and editor Chris Horne; Alex Bender, who writes the nightlife column, "Permanent Bender"; the love columnist, "Mr. Macon Out;" Debra McCorkle, a.k.a. "Mama Karma," whose column has been picked up by NPR and the San Francisco Chronicle; as well as "Sarcastic", Whit Mumbley's column on community news and politics. Past columnists have included Dr. Thomas Upchurch and Food Dude.

== News ==
The website Go Round Town for Middle Georgia, describes The 11th Hour as one of the best sources of arts and entertainment information, including reviews of restaurants and culture. In addition to featuring arts and entertainment, The 11th Hour has done investigative feature stories on prostitution, methamphetamine abuse, unsolved murders and the issue of sex offenders in communities. The 11th Hour reports on local politics and has featured interviews with local community and political leaders, including Macon's former mayor, C. Jack Ellis. Interviews in The 11th Hour have included nationally known actors, writers and musicians, such as Billy Bob Thornton, George Jones, Mr. Food, R.E.M.'s Mike Mills, and Gregg Allman, in addition to regional cultural figures.

The 11th Hour routinely organizes public events. In 2007, they staged an awards ceremony for their "Reader's Choice" winners, featuring comedy and music through the evening, and distributing "Golden Naked Babies," spray-painted baby dolls. In 2006, the staff initiated Macon's first "Thriller Zombie Parade", in which participants dressed as zombies and re-enacted the dance from Michael Jackson's Thriller video. Later that year, they staged LebowskiFest, in honor of the film The Big Lebowski. The 11th Hour staff (with help from Bibb Music and the Georgia State Fair) gathered people to reach the Guinness Book of World Records for "Largest Kazoo Ensemble," but fell short.

== Television ==
In 2006, in partnership with Cox Communications, The 11th Hour launched a television show on WCOX 15 based on its articles. The show airs three times a day, seven days a week, at 10 a.m., 7:30 p.m. and 10:30 p.m. Starting in December 2006, new episodes of the show aired monthly.

== Ownership ==
The 11th Hour is owned by publisher Brad Evans and his wife, the art director Meagan Brown Evans.
