= The Weekly Recorder =

Weekly newspaper in Pennsylvania, US

The Weekly Recorder is a 135-year-old weekly newspaper founded in Claysville, Pennsylvania, US. It has been printed every week except for one three-month period in 1960s.

== History ==
The newspaper was founded by a Mr. Irwin, who sold it in its first year to the Melvin family. George Melvin sold it in the 1960s, after briefly closing it, to Gene Shaw. Shaw ran the company until 1973, when he sold it to "Buck" and Betty Jones. They continued the newspaper until it was sold in 1982 to Douglas Teagarden. Teagarden ran the paper until 2002 when it was purchased by Cody Knotts. Prior to the Knotts purchase, the paper concentrated on the news of the McGuffey School District in Southwestern Pennsylvania. Knotts switched format and the publication become an investigative tabloid concentrating on politics and crime.

In early August 2011, Knotts sold the Weekly Recorder to DFM Publishing. DFM continued to carry political news, but also focused on a wider variety of content such as sports, arts and entertainment, fitness, etc. DFM also expanded The Weekly Recorder content and distribution into other counties in Southwestern PA. The paper then had an interactive website which was updated frequently and allowed users to chat and view past issues.

In 2023 the intellectual property of the paper was acquired by Penn West Media with Daryl W. Price and Matthew G. Uram serving as publishers. The new version covers the entirety of Washington County PA including all 67 municipalities and 15 school districts. The Weekly Recorders current focus is government, faith, business, energy, agriculture, sports, and outdoors. Circulation is weekly in both print and online.
