= Citynews =

Italian publishing group

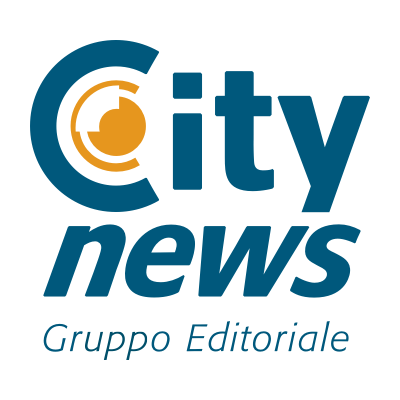
- Headquarters: Rome, Naples, Italy
- Area served: National, metropolitan
- Key people: Luca Lani, Fernando Diana – company founders Krzysztof K. Wasielewski – CTO
- Website: citynews.it

Citynews is an Italian newspaper group founded in 2010 by Luca Lani and Fernando Diana. The company prepares forty-seven local editions, one national edition, and one international edition. For several consecutive years, it has been one of the third most popular Italian newspapers.

== History ==
Citynews was founded in January 2010 by Luca Lani and Fernando Diana as a journalistic start-up. In 2011, after the opening of FoggiaToday, it joined the company with a first round of investment of 3 million Euros, followed by other acquisitions of digital publications such as, LeccePrima, RomagnaOggi and AgrigentoNotizie. By the end of 2011, Citynews was the publisher of thirty newspapers with fifty-six journalists working in total.

In 2012, Citynews and opened newspapers in Monza, Treviso, Venice, Trento, and Udine. In March, the national newspaper Today was established.

In 2013, a second investment round of 1.5 million euros was signed by venture capital: Citynews became a joint-stock company, reaching a balanced budget in June. In the same year, they released the new App for iOS and Android.

In 2014, Citynews acquired the Brindisi-based BrindisiReport and the main online newspaper in Trieste, TriestePrima. By the end of 2014, Citynews was running solely on advertising income. Prior to this, their advertising partners were Fox Network and Fox International Channels. They have opened several offices with focal points in Rome and Milan.

In 2015, CityNews established a newspaper in Avellino, closing the year with forty-two newspapers. They were accepted to join Audiweb. The next year, all newspapers were redesigned and Walter Bonanno became General Manager of the Editorial Group. In 2017, CityNews revealed a new logo and released mobile apps for each of their newspapers. QuiComo, FrosinoneToday and CasertaNews were acquired.

In the same year, CityNews launched EuropaToday, in order to cover the European Parliament in Italy. At the end of the year, they had 47 newspapers and 200 journalists. At the end of 2017, Citynews was ranked the third in the comScore ranking of national online publications.

In April 2018, Citynews was ranked the second in the Comscore among the national online publications based on views, with almost 21 million visitors, ahead of Corriere della Sera, but behind la Repubblica. In July 2018, Citynews went down in ranking to the 4th position among online publications. In the same month, Citynews launches TerniToday. In August 2018, Citynews ranked as the 2nd most popular online publication based on view count.

The company is present in the Sole24ore ranking 216 among 350 Italian companies with the highest growth rate.

== Structure ==
Citynews publishes forty-seven local editions and five national editions. Their editorial team consists of 250 people, including company employees and freelancers. The Citynews editorial group includes the following editions:

=== Metropolitan editions ===
- Agrigentonotizie
- AnconaToday
- ArezzonoToday
- AvellinoToday
- BariToday
- BolognaToday
- BresciaToday
- BrindisiReport
- CasertaNews
- CataniaToday
- CesenaToday
- ChietiToday
- FirenzeToday
- FoggiaToday
- ForliToday
- FrosinoneToday
- GenovaToday
- ilPescara
- ilPiacenza
- LatinaToday
- Lecceprima
- LeccoToday
- MilanoToday
- ModenaToday
- MonzaToday
- NapoliToday
- NovaraToday
- Padovaoggi
- PalermoToday
- ParmaToday
- PerugiaToday
- PisaToday
- Quicomo
- RavennaToday
- RiminiToday'
- RomaToday
- SalernoToday
- SondrioToday
- TerniToday
- TorinoToday
- TrentoToday
- TrevisoToday
- Triesteprima
- UdineToday
- VeneziaToday
- VeronaSera
- VicenzaToday

=== National and thematic editions ===
- AgrifoodToday
- EuropaToday
- RomaGnaoGGi
- SportPiaCenza
- Today
