= New Times (weekly) =

Weekly newspaper published in San Luis Obispo

- Type: Alternative weekly
- Format: Tabloid
- Owner(s): New Times Media Group
- Publisher: Bob Rucker, Alex Zuniga
- Editor: Camillia Lanham
- Founded: 1986
- Headquarters: 1010 Marsh Street, San Luis Obispo, California 93401 United States
- Circulation: 25,000 (as of 2023)
- Sister newspapers: Santa Maria Sun
- Website: newtimesslo.com

The New Times is a locally owned weekly alternative newspaper that serves for the city and surrounding county of San Luis Obispo. It is distributed free of charge in print and on the web.

This publication is a member of the Association of Alternative Newsmedia (AAN). Camillia Lanham is the editor.

The paper is owned by New Times Media Group, which also owns the Santa Maria Sun.

== History ==
The New Times weekly newspaper was originally founded and owned independently by Steve Moss in 1986, with help from friends Bev Johnson and Alex Zuniga. In 1987, Moss launched a short story contest, 55 Fiction, which required authors to write a short story in 55 words or less. The winner were published through the New Times weekly, which received thousands of short stories from around the world. The contest also led to plays and movies based on the short stories, as well as two books of short story compilations.

Bob Rucker joined the New Times in 1998 from Sonoma County Independent.

In 2000, the New Times launched the Santa Maria Sun, an independent paper serving northern Santa Barbara County.

In 2005, owner Steve Moss died unexpectedly from complications due to epilepsy.

After Moss' death, ownership of paper transferred to Bob Rucker and Alex Zuniga.

== Controversies ==
In 2002, the New Times was criticized by local community members for publishing an article about the lewd behavior conviction of a local television personality and producer.

In 2006, Jim Mullin became editor of the paper. Mullin's tenure was short, as he had to resign soon thereafter due to controversy about a story on methamphetamine labs titled, "Meth Made Easy". The story, which included a recipe for meth, drew national attention and threats to boycott the weekly.
