= Columbia City Hall (South Carolina) =

- U.S. National Register of Historic Places
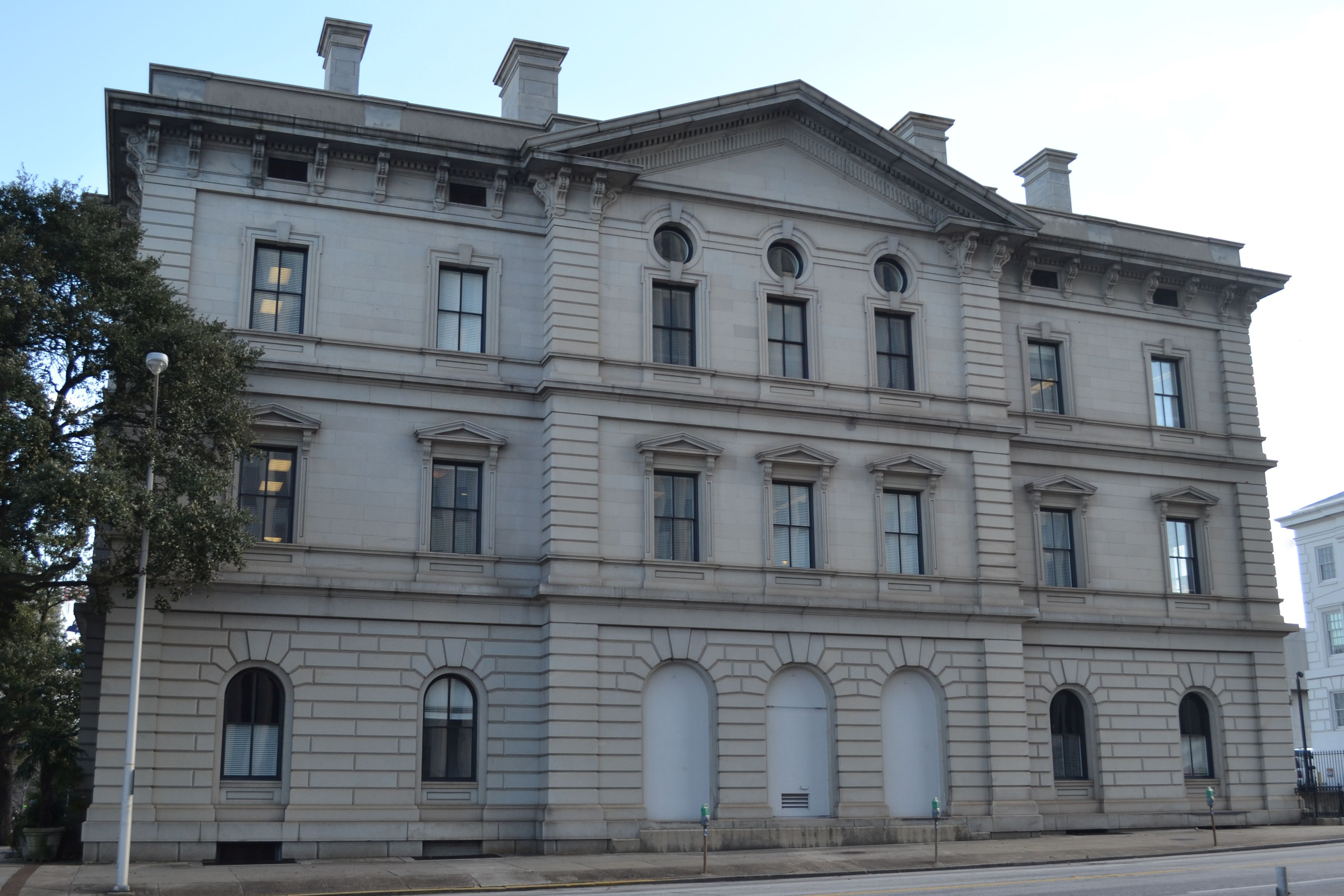
- City Hall building in 2016

- Location within South Carolina Location within the United States
- Location: Main and Laurel Sts., Columbia, South Carolina
- Coordinates: 34°0′32″N 81°2′15″W
- Area: less than one acre
- Built: 1870
- Architect: Alfred B. Mullett; James Knox Taylor
- Architectural style: Renaissance revival
- NRHP reference No.: 73001725
- Added to NRHP: June 19, 1973

The Columbia City Hall, in Columbia, South Carolina, also known as Old United States Court House and Post Office, was built in 1870 at a cost of $400,000 (approximately $13,200,000 in 2025). It served as a federal courthouse from 1874 to 1936 when it was re-purposed to serve as the city hall.

It was listed on the National Register of Historic Places in 1973. It includes Renaissance architecture. It served historically as a courthouse and as a post office.

It was designed by Alfred B. Mullett.

== History ==
=== Construction ===
The Grant Administration appropriated funds for the building and construction began in 1870. The Supervising Architect of the Treasury, Alfred B. Mullett, designed the building.

=== Courthouse and post office ===
Once opened, the building hosted both a United States federal court and a post office. The post office relocated in 1921.

=== City hall ===
In 1935, the city government engaged in a land-swap deal with the federal government to take ownership of the building. It has used it as the city hall since.

== Gallery ==
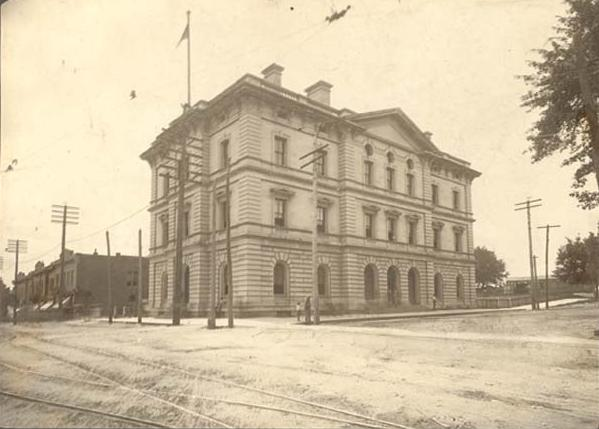
City Hall building (c.1900)

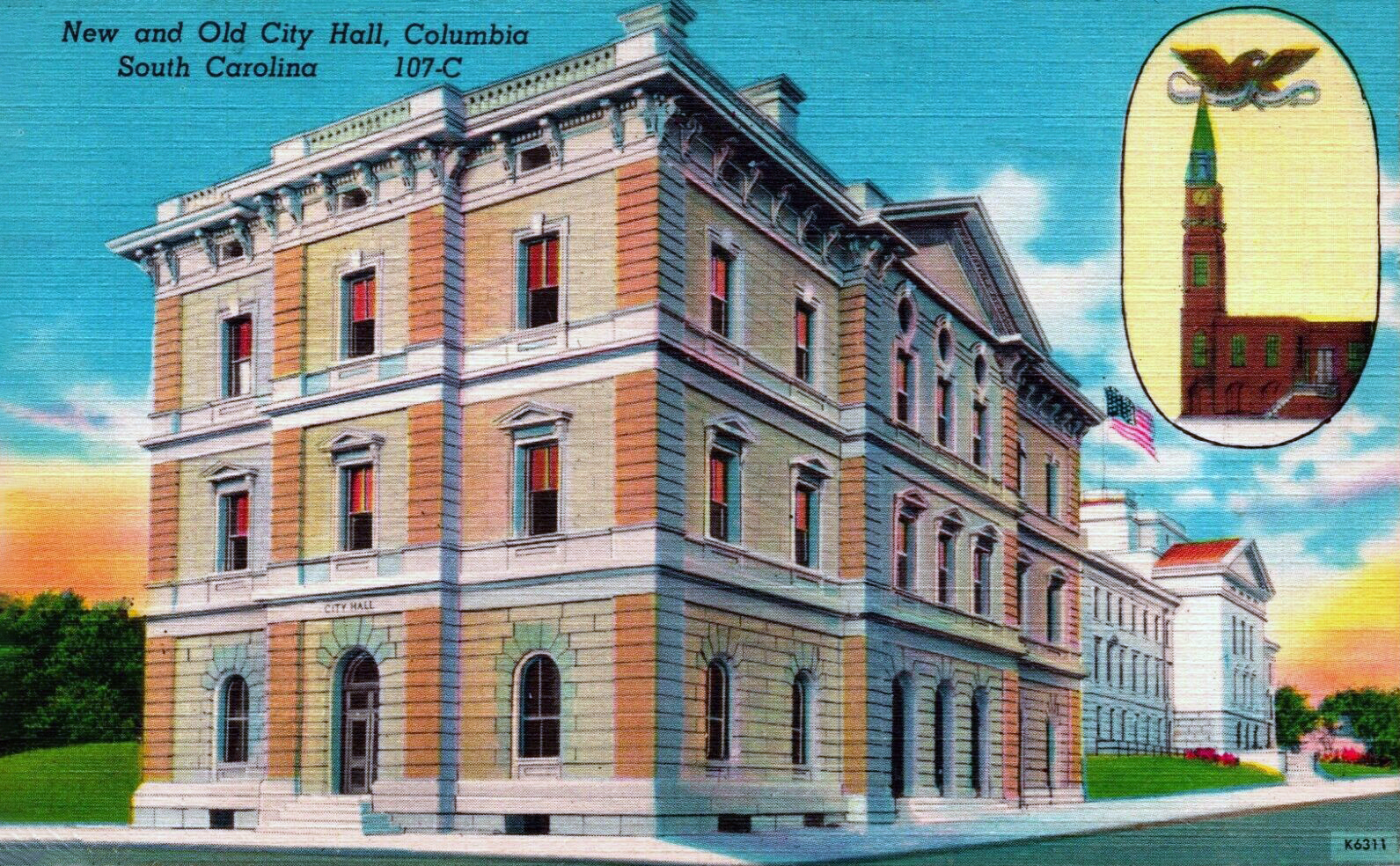
Drawing of the New City Hall building (c. 1940)

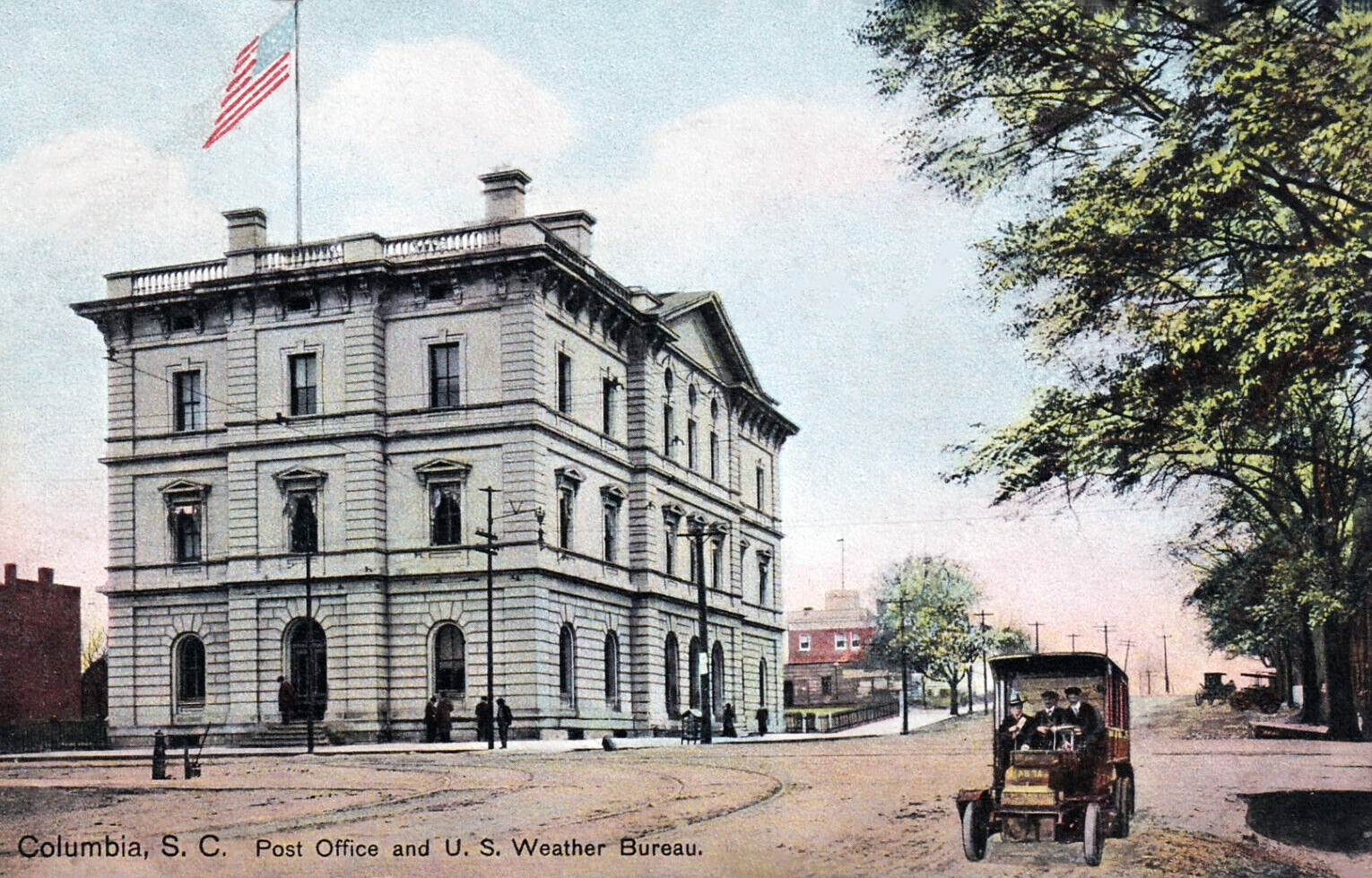
Drawing of the City Hall building (c. 1912)
