= Pulse Niagara =

- Type: Weekly newspaper
- Format: Tabloid
- Owner(s): Dynasty Communication Inc
- Editor: Ron Kilpatrick
- Founded: 1985; 40 years ago
- Political alignment: Centre Left
- Headquarters: St. Catharines, Ontario, Canada
- Website: www.pulseniagara.com

Pulse Niagara was an alternative weekly newspaper serving the Niagara Region in Ontario, Canada. Its offices were located in downtown St. Catharines, Ontario.

Pulse Niagara was a weekly publication which served the Niagara region of Ontario. In 2010 it merged with Hamilton's View Magazine to serve both markets which are right beside each other.

== Masthead ==
- Publisher: Ron Kilpatrick
- Editor in Chief: Jordy Yack
- Editorial Assistant: Alexandra Bates
- Advertising Sales Manager: Dayna Dubecki
- Gaming Section: Christina Winterburn

Founded by Jenifer Cass in December 1986, PULSE NIAGARA emerged as the Niagara Region's premier voice of independent music. Editor David DeRocco penned the magazine's first feature, a 1986 article on homegrown band Honeymoon Suite. The magazine was sold to Dynasty in 1996.

== See also ==
- List of newspapers in Canada
