= Salem Weekly =

Defunct alternative newspaper in Salem, Oregon, United States

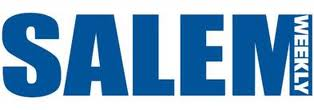
- Type: Alternative monthly
- Format: Tabloid
- Owner(s): Independent
- Publisher: A.P. Walther
- Founded: 2005
- Ceased publication: October 2018
- Headquarters: Salem, Oregon, USA
- Circulation: 50,000 readers per issue
- Website: salemweeklynews.com

Salem Weekly (formerly Salem Monthly) was an alternative newspaper publication in Salem, Oregon, United States. The semi-weekly paper was established as a monthly in April 2003 and closed in November 2018. It was owned and published by Andrew Paul "A.P." Walther.

== History ==
The Salem Monthly traces its origins to a coffee house in downtown Salem, Oregon called the Coffee House Cafe. Dating back to the mid-1990s, the cafe served as a popular meeting place and hangout for Salem's youth culture. In its later years of operation, the cafe began publishing a newsletter to engage customers in Salem's community and cultural affairs. Inspired by the reaction to the cafe's newsletter, cafe owner A.P. Walther decided to start up a publishing operation for an alternative newspaper in town. On November 28, 2018, the Statesman Journal reported the closure of Salem Weekly, which the Weekly announced in a letter relayed to the Statesman via local blogger Brian Hines. The last issue of the paper was published on October 25.

== Topics ==
Topics covered in past issues include: the stigma of living on welfare; the dangers of pollution and whether recycling helps; Chemeketa Community College's financial struggles; local gay citizens' reactions to the nullification of gay marriages that took place in Multnomah County; local residents' experiences of racism; internment of Japanese, Italian, and German Americans during World War II; the Native American perspective on Thanksgiving; Bush's abuses of power; Noam Chomsky and the Iraq War.

== Mission ==
Publisher A.P. Walther says Salem Monthly was created to give Salem "exposure to local news, thought, and culture in the greater Salem area."
