= Royster Guano Superfund site =

Site in Columbia, SC cleared of arsenic contamination

Coordinates: 33.9793°N 81.0089°W

The Royster Guano Superfund site is a Superfund site located near a former fertilizer factory in Columbia, South Carolina. From 1902 to c. 1935, lead and arsenic associated with superphosphate fertilizer production accumulated in a pond north of the factory. After the factory closed, the pond was drained and developed as the Edisto Court neighborhood. In 2012, contamination was discovered and the United States Environmental Protection Agency (EPA) carried out removal of contaminated soils from residential properties.

== Historical background ==
=== Pond ===
The most hazardous contamination associated with the Royster Guano Superfund site settled in a pond north of the fertilizer factory. A description of the pond and its relationship to the founding of the Royster Guano factory is supplied in a 1906 opinion issued by the South Carolina Supreme Court, in response to a legal dispute between Royster and the pond's owners.

The location chosen for the Royster Guano Company's Columbia plant was originally part of a 300-acre tract of land purchased by Adeline J. Fowles from Julia C. Marshall in 1894. The tract was situated near the southern limit of Columbia, offered access to the Southern and Coast Line railroads, and contained a pond that was filled with water by nearby springs. Earlier attempts by Marshall to drain the pond out towards the railroad had been abandoned when the Southern Railway Company closed the drainage ditch. As the tract’s new owners, the Fowles family re-opened the ditch in 1896 to drain the pond for cultivation. They used the dry land where the pond had been for pasture and to grow rice, corn, potatoes, and hay from 1897 to 1900.

The winter and spring of 1901 were unusually wet, causing a large amount of rainwater to accumulate in the basin of the pond. In May of that year, Norfolk-based fertilizer magnate F.S. Royster visited Columbia in search of a site for a new factory. Royster inspected the Fowles property with Adeline’s husband, J. Newton Fowles. Royster and Fowles discussed the possibility of draining the surplus water from the pond to use in the fertilizer production process, which requires water to cool the acid. Royster assured Fowles that his friendly relationship with the railroad companies would allow him to open up the old ditch without issue.

On May 20, 1901, Adeline Fowles conveyed a 15-acre parcel of her tract, just south of the pond, to the Royster Guano Company. The terms of the sale included the right to divert water from the springs and pond into a reservoir on Royster’s parcel. However, a years-long legal battle soon followed over the pond, as Royster attempted to sue Fowles for draining the pond completely at the end of 1901, thereby depriving the factory of water. In 1906 the Supreme Court of South Carolina ruled in favor of Fowles, saying that the defendants had no obligation to store water for the company on their land.

Over the following decades, arsenic and lead from the superphosphate fertilizer manufacturing process settled in the natural basin of the pond north of the factory parcel.

=== Factory operations ===
The Columbia branch of the Royster Guano Company began operations in January 1902 and lasted until about 1935. The factory's creation reflects regional economic commitments to increase superphosphate fertilizer production in support of the cotton industry in the post-American Civil War southern United States. Superphosphate fertilizers were made by mixing raw phosphate ore with sulfuric acid to create fine, dry, and water soluble fertilizers that were easily transported, easily applied, and easily absorbed by crops.

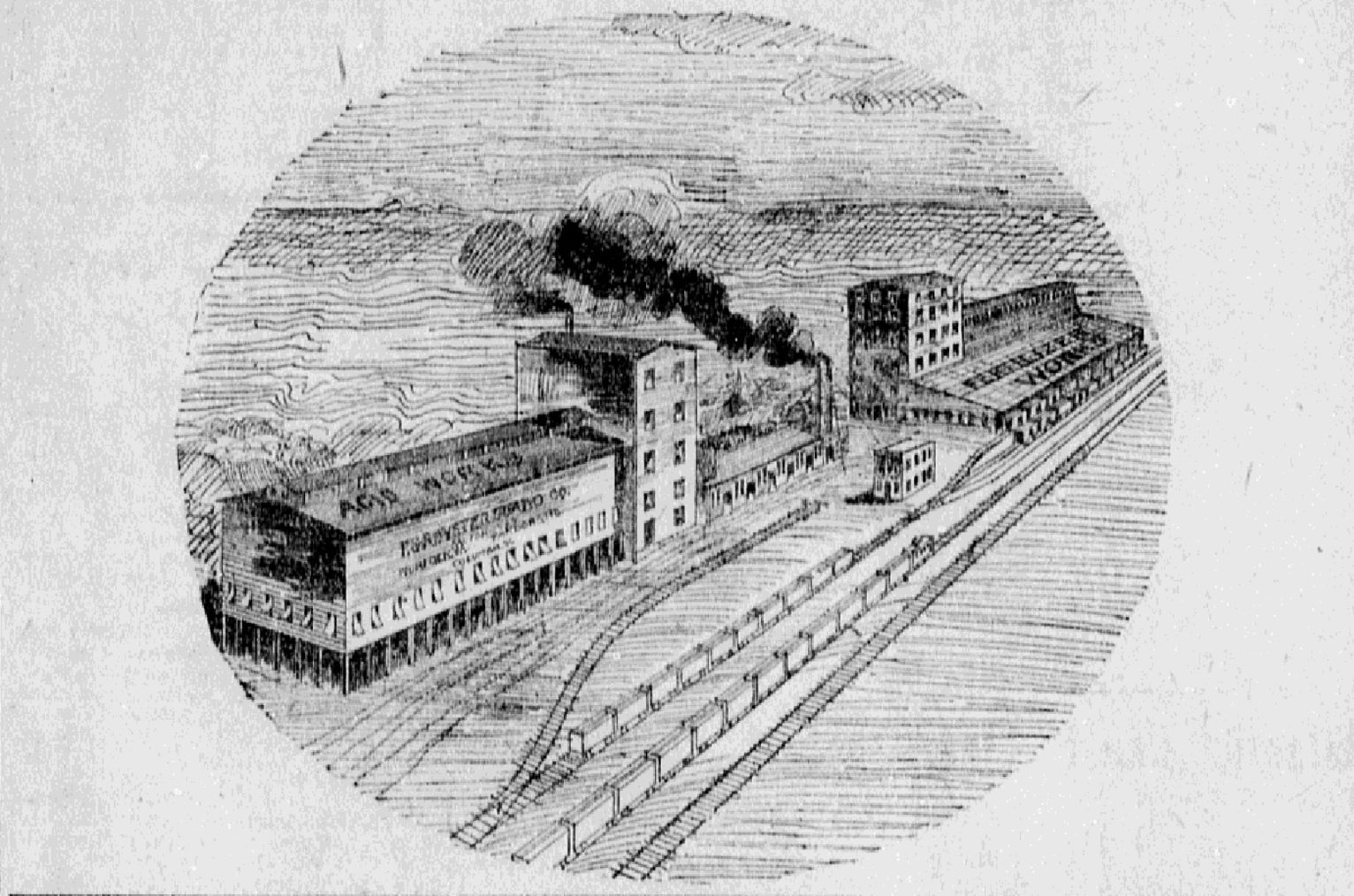
Royster Guano Company fertilizer factory in Columbia, South Carolina in 1902

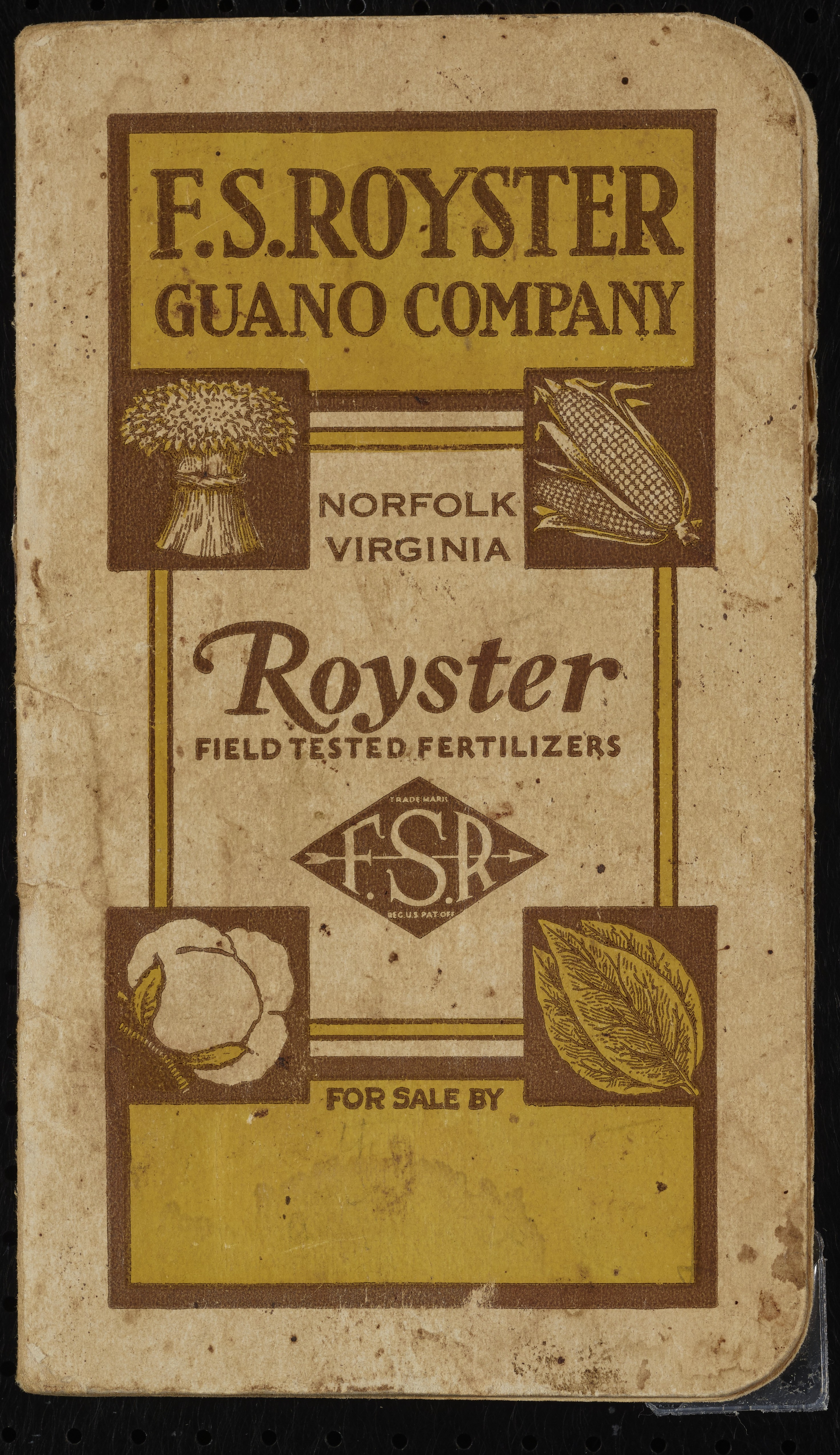
F.S. Royster Guano Company advertising booklet from c. 1930

The Columbia Royster Guano factory ran night and day producing sulfuric acid and superphosphate fertilizers, using electricity generated by the Columbia Canal. The factory included two main buildings, the acid works and the fertilizer works.

In the acid works, dozens of furnaces were used to burn pyrite ore imported from Spain, releasing sulfuric acid vapor. The vapor passed through leaden chambers cooled by water and became liquid acid. The liquid acid was then forced into a tower where it was cooled and purified, and then collected into two large tanks in the basement of the tower. Because the acid was so dangerous, the factory used egg-shaped casks made of lead, bound in cast iron, to transport it to the fertilizer works.

In the fertilizer works, phosphate ore was crushed into a fine powder and then mixed with the sulfuric acid to produce acid phosphate. This material was left to dry in large bins. Gases released as the acid phosphate dried were drawn off through a condenser and dissipated in an attempt to prevent foul odors. After twenty-four hours, the acid phosphate was used as the base for making fertilizers by mixing it with “tankage” – blood, hair, horns, and hoofs from slaughterhouses – as well as decomposing fish or cotton seed meal. At its opening in 1902, the plant boasted a production capacity of 40,000 tons of fertilizer per year, and a daily output of 40 tons of sulfuric acid.

The production of superphosphate fertilizers at this site from 1902 to c. 1935 contaminated the surrounding area with arsenic and lead, which eventually settled in the pond north of the factory. Arsenic was a waste byproduct from using sulfuric acid to digest ore. Lead leached from pipes as well as the vaults and casks used to contain and transport the sulfuric acid.

=== Working conditions ===
When the Royster Guano Company first opened its Columbia factory in 1902, 100 men were reportedly at work in the plant, with the expectation that this number would increase to 200 later that year. Up until the mid-1920s, the company frequently ran ads in Columbia newspapers to recruit up to 150 laborers at a time, promising free transportation to the plant from downtown Columbia and meals on site.

Workers at Columbia's Royster Guano plant dealt with difficult and dangerous conditions. The sulfuric acid used in fertilizer production was known to be lethal. While deaths on the job seem to have been avoided at the Columbia plant, incompetent management at the company's branch in Macon, Georgia, in 1908 caused three African American employees to die from inhaling fumes in the acid chamber, and another four to fall seriously ill in the same incident.

On-the-job injuries were common at the plant in Columbia. When pushing a wheelbarrow in 1905, factory employee Benjamin Martin suffered injuries from an accident, which he attributed to the negligence of his boss. Another worker, Jeffrey Polite, fell through the roof of the factory in 1908 when he could not see a skylight covered in guano dust. In 1911, a worker named John B. Howell was injured when a scaffold being used to build fertilizer bins collapsed.

=== Factory closure ===
Just after midnight on December 10, 1927, the building housing the plant's acid works caught fire. Only five people were in the factory at the time and they could do little to prevent the flames from spreading. The fire destroyed the sulfuric acid production facility and the acid chambers, causing thousands of gallons of 60% sulfuric acid to be spilled onto the ground. The next day, a spokesman for the company rushed to assure the public that the disaster would have no impact on fertilizer shipments scheduled for the coming spring. However, it was unclear if the acid works would be rebuilt.

F.S. Royster, the company president, died shortly after the Columbia acid works fire on March 1, 1928. While fertilizer production may have carried on for a few more years, later reporting on the site history by EPA suggests that the factory had ceased operations by c. 1935.

=== Redevelopment ===
In the 1940s, the pond north of the Royster Guano Factory grounds was drained and the area developed as a residential neighborhood known as Edisto Court. Nearby Commerce Drive continued to be used as an industrial corridor. In 1949, Seaco, Inc. purchased a three-acre tract on Commerce Drive, a portion of the parcel previously used by the Royster Guano Company for fertilizer production, for an asphalt emulsion plant.

== Superfund designation and cleanup ==
=== Discovery ===
In July 2012, a consultant working on behalf of Seaco, Inc. found dangerous levels of arsenic in the groundwater near the Seaco asphalt emulsion plant on Commerce Drive. State officials from the South Carolina Department of Health and Environmental Control (DHEC) began investigating the area. Because asphalt manufacturing does not typically produce arsenic, DHEC officials looked for other potential sources in the Commerce Drive industrial corridor. Further study linked the contamination to fertilizer production at the Royster Guano Factory. Other early twentieth-century industries located in the area, like a cattle-bathing operation, were also likely contributors to the contamination. DHEC requested assistance from the EPA to assess contamination levels in Edisto Court residential properties and to develop a plan for cleanup. Royster Guano became a non-National Priorities List (non-NPL) Superfund site.

=== Investigation ===
In their investigation, DHEC and EPA found levels reaching above 27,000 ppm for lead and 11,000 ppm for arsenic in the impacted area, but noted that values varied considerably according to sample location and that the highest values were not on residential properties. The agencies either screened or sampled 48 out of 51 residential properties in the Edisto Court neighborhood for contaminants. Contamination levels from the residential properties were highly variable. However, about 15 properties were found to have significant lead contamination from the ground surface to a depth of two feet, in some cases reaching as high as 3000 ppm. Lead in some yards was reported at levels nine times higher than the federal safety standard, and likewise arsenic in some yards was reported at levels 39 times the federal safety standard.

To address these concerns, DHEC conducted medical tests for approximately 75 current and past residents of the Edisto Court neighborhood. The tests did not find unsafe levels of arsenic and lead in these residents. However, exposure to contaminated soil on residential properties still posed a potential health hazard, especially for children. Possible contamination of the water table was determined not to be a threat because the neighborhood receives its water from the city, rather than from wells.

DHEC and EPA officials theorized that lead and arsenic from superphosphate fertilizer production had settled in the old pond north of the Royster parcel. When the pond was drained and developed as the Edisto Court neighborhood, the contaminated soil that had accumulated in its basin was not removed. Houses built in the lowest parts of the now-dry pond had higher levels of contamination, while houses built uphill had lower levels. This theory of contamination is further supported by map overlays showing the Edisto Court neighborhood's proximity to the old acid works, which in 1927 collapsed in a fire and spilled thousands of gallons of sulfuric acid onto the ground.

=== Community response ===
The discovery of contamination in their neighborhood was painful and worrying for many Edisto Court residents. Community members questioned how the arsenic and lead had impacted their health over the years, especially the health of the generations of children who grew up playing in Edisto Court yards and likely ingested soil. For some Edisto Court residents, the discovery of the Royster contamination was a troubling reminder of an earlier battle they waged against a nuclear laundry - a facility that washed radioactive clothing from the Savannah River Site nuclear weapons complex - that they drove out of the neighborhood in the 1990s.

=== Cleanup ===
In late August 2012, EPA announced plans to clean up about a dozen contaminated yards in the Edisto Court neighborhood. From November through December 2012, EPA removed superficial soil up to a depth of two feet from contaminated yards, reasoning that deeper soil layers would not be a threat because the risk of exposure is relatively low. About 30 mature trees were taken out as well.

In all, more than 100 dump truck loads of contaminated soil were removed from the residential properties and replaced with clean soil. The contaminated soil was deposited in a landfill. Residents were not relocated during the cleanup process, but soil was kept moist during removal activities to avoid the spread of dust. Grass, fencing, and walkways were restored to complete the cleanup.

The estimated cost of the Royster Guano Superfund cleanup was reported to be $500,000 in federal taxpayer money. When the contamination was originally discovered, there was speculation that Canadian agribusiness Agrium could potentially be held liable for the cleanup costs because it had acquired the Royster-Clark fertilizer company, a later version of Royster Guano, in 2006. While the EPA was reportedly exploring the potential liability of Agrium in September 2012, the end result of this research is unclear.

Images from the EPA photolog documenting activities at the Royster Guano Superfund site

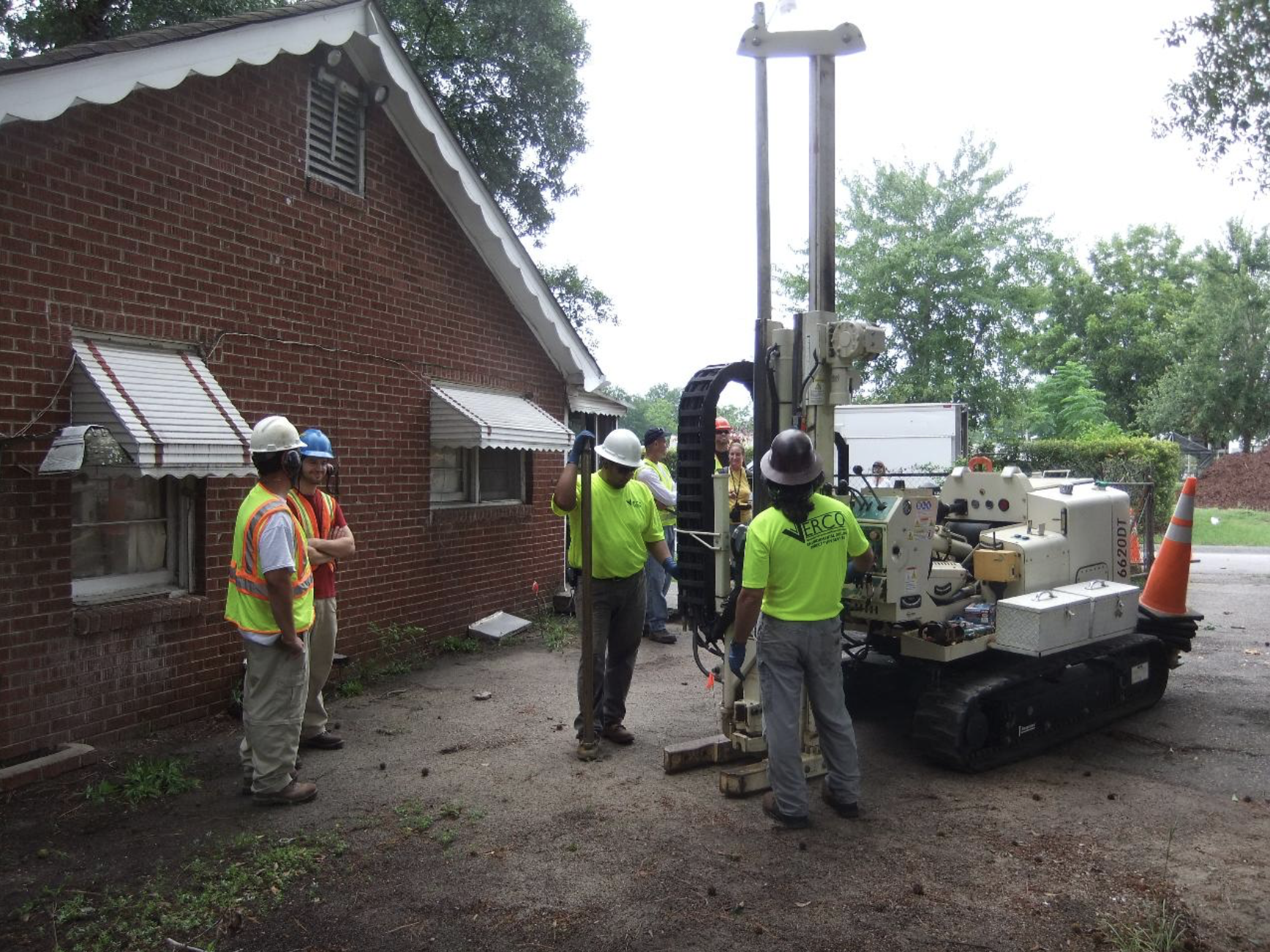
Collecting a soil core for testing

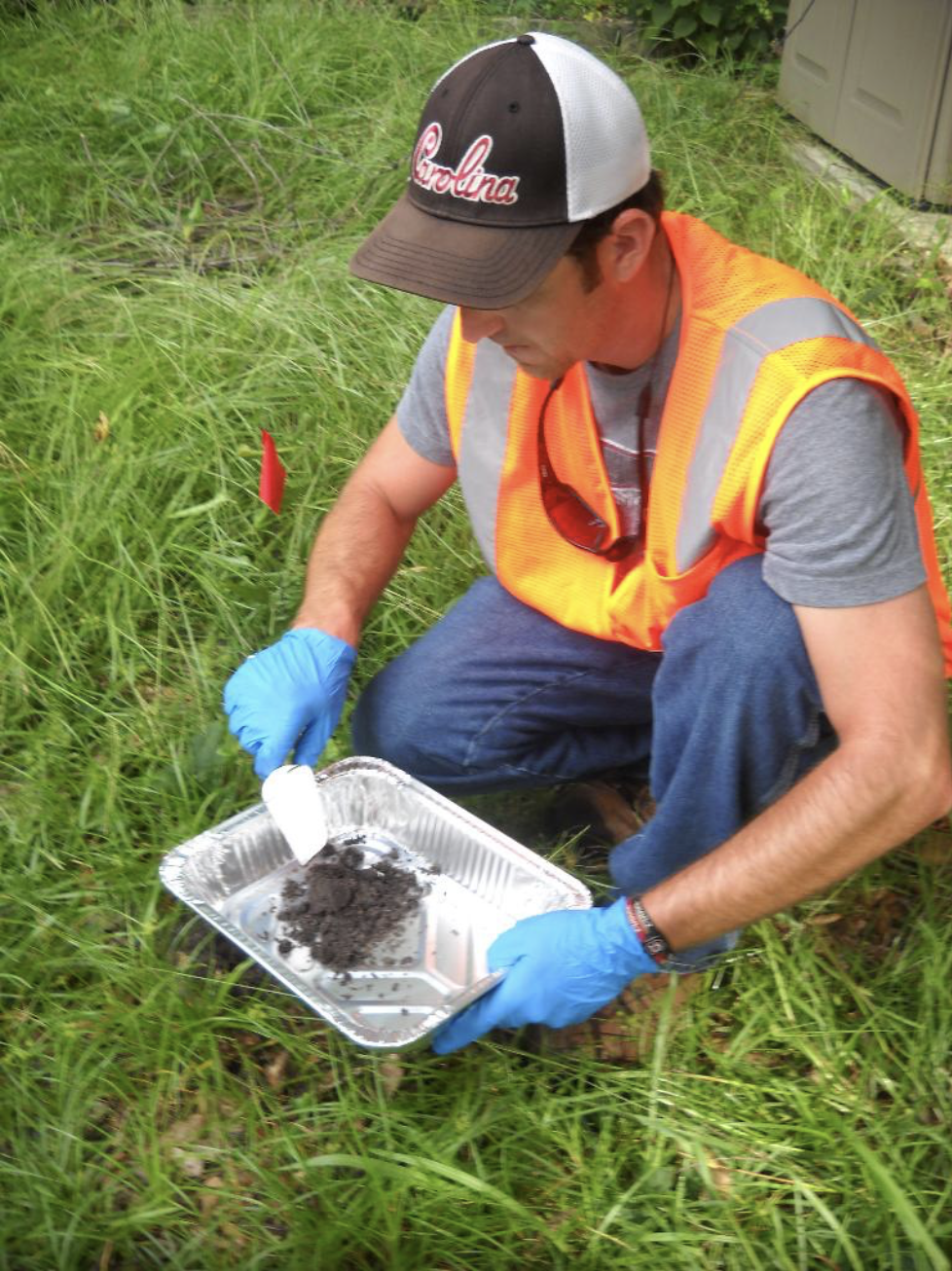
Collecting a surface soil sample

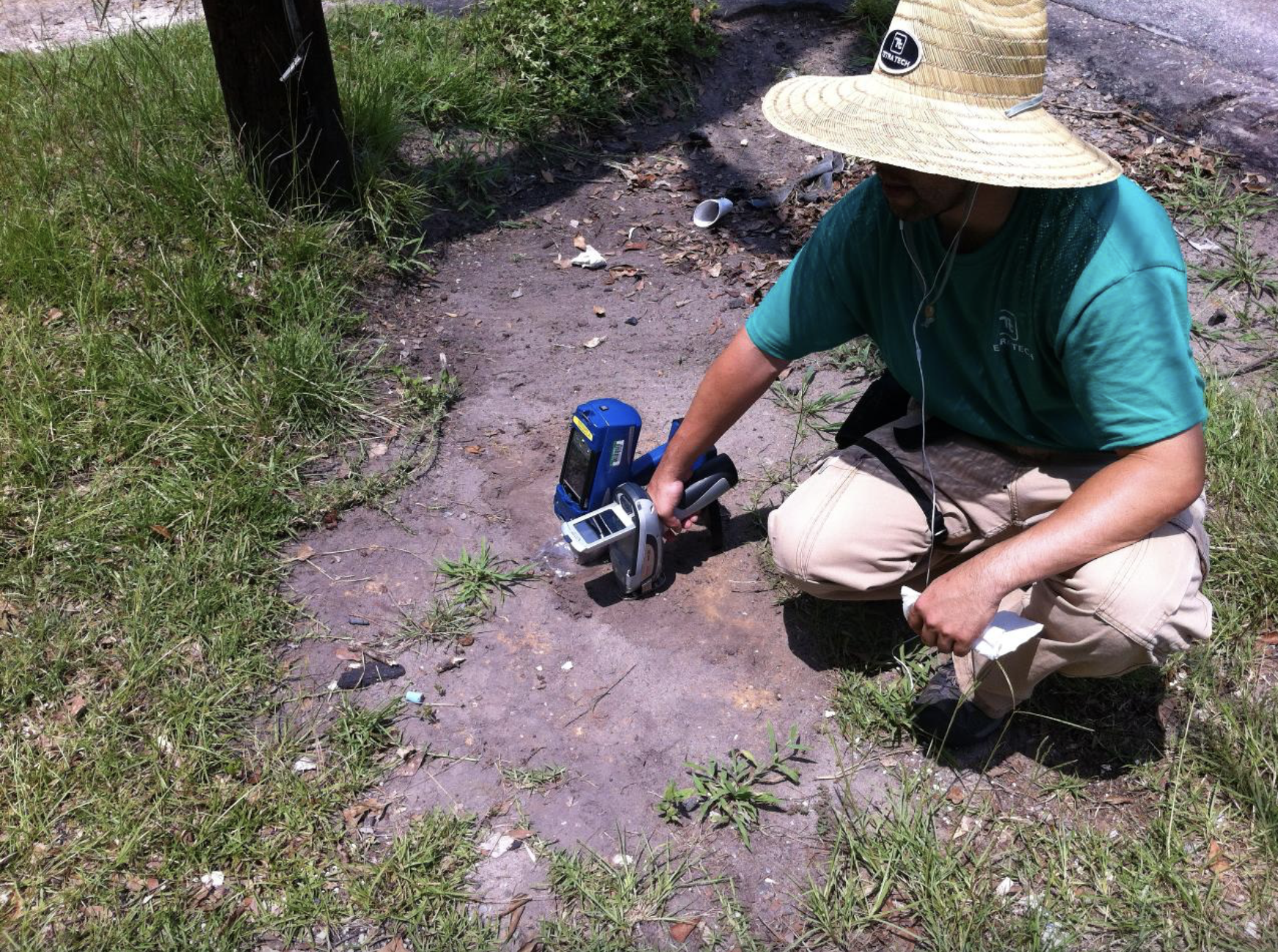
Testing for contaminants using a pXRF analyzer

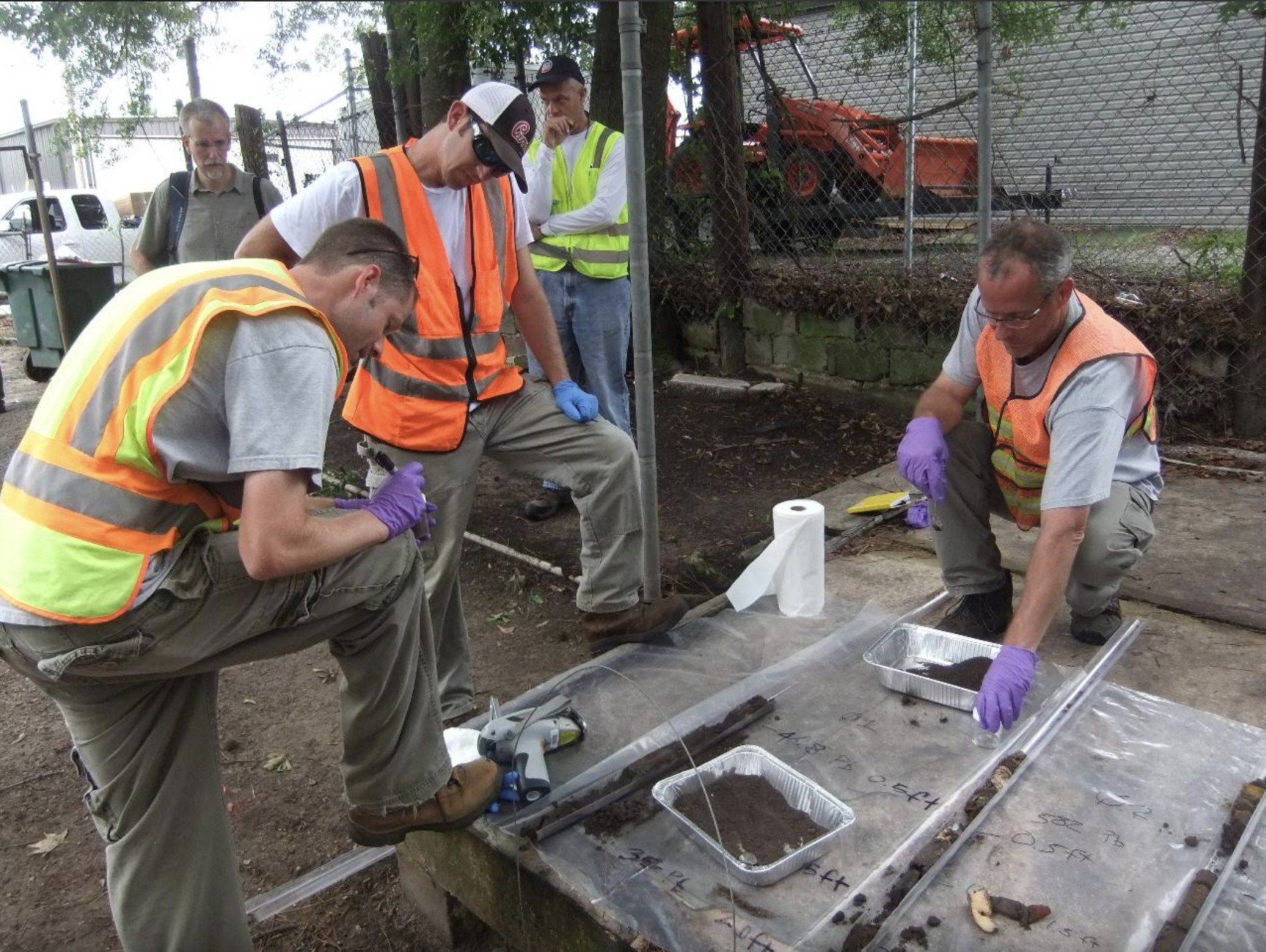
Logging core samples

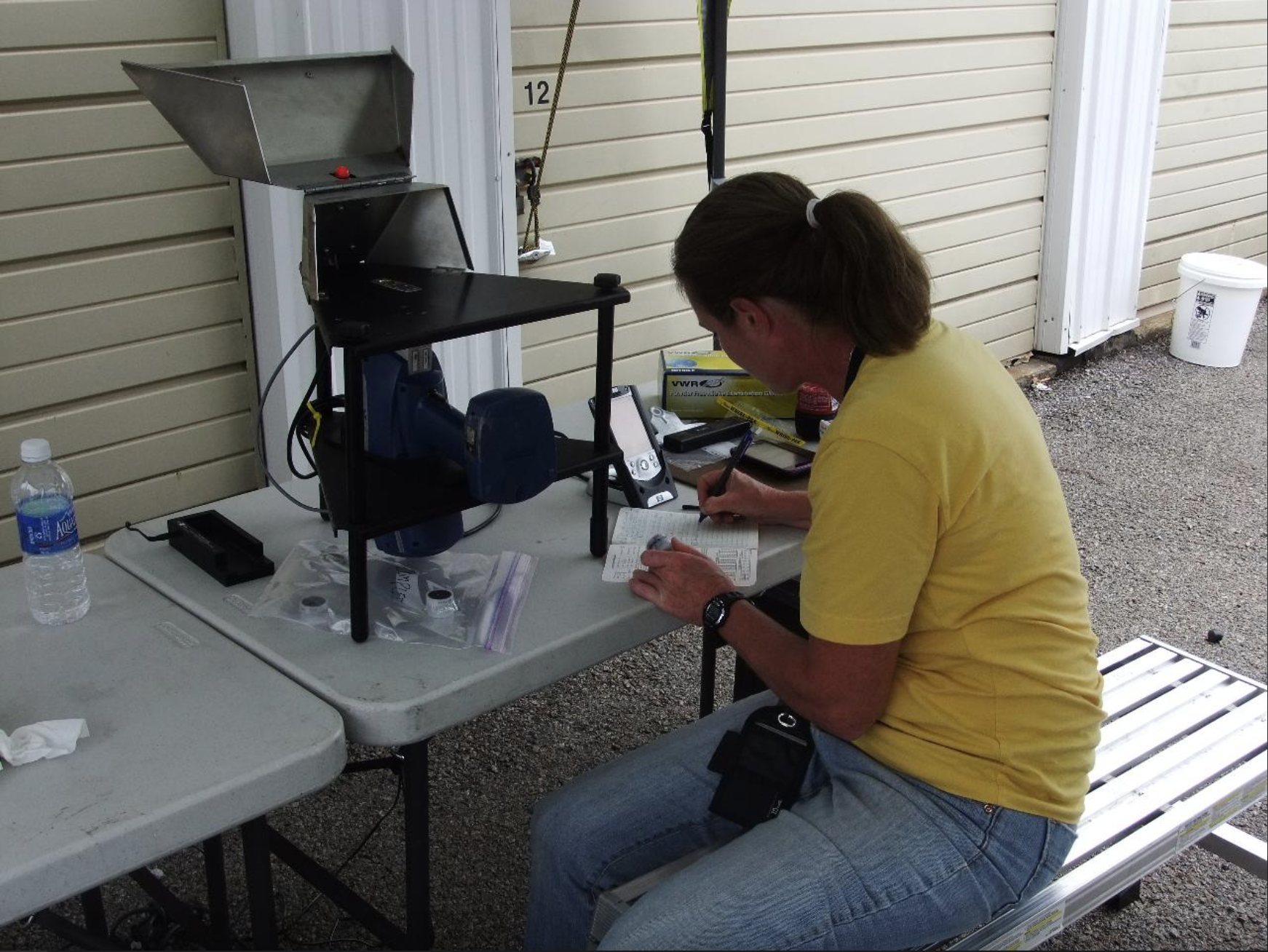
Running XRF analysis of soil samples

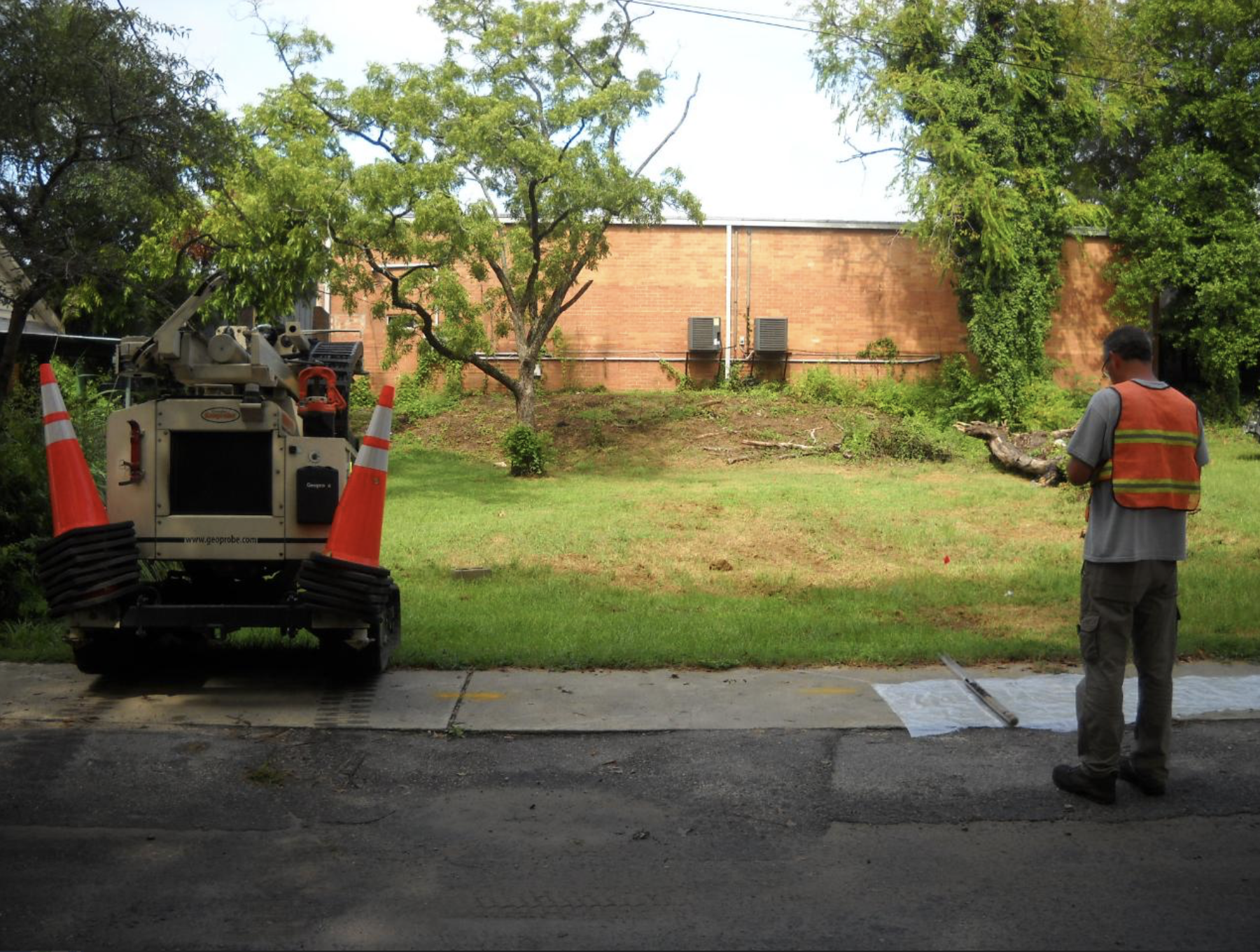
Soil testing

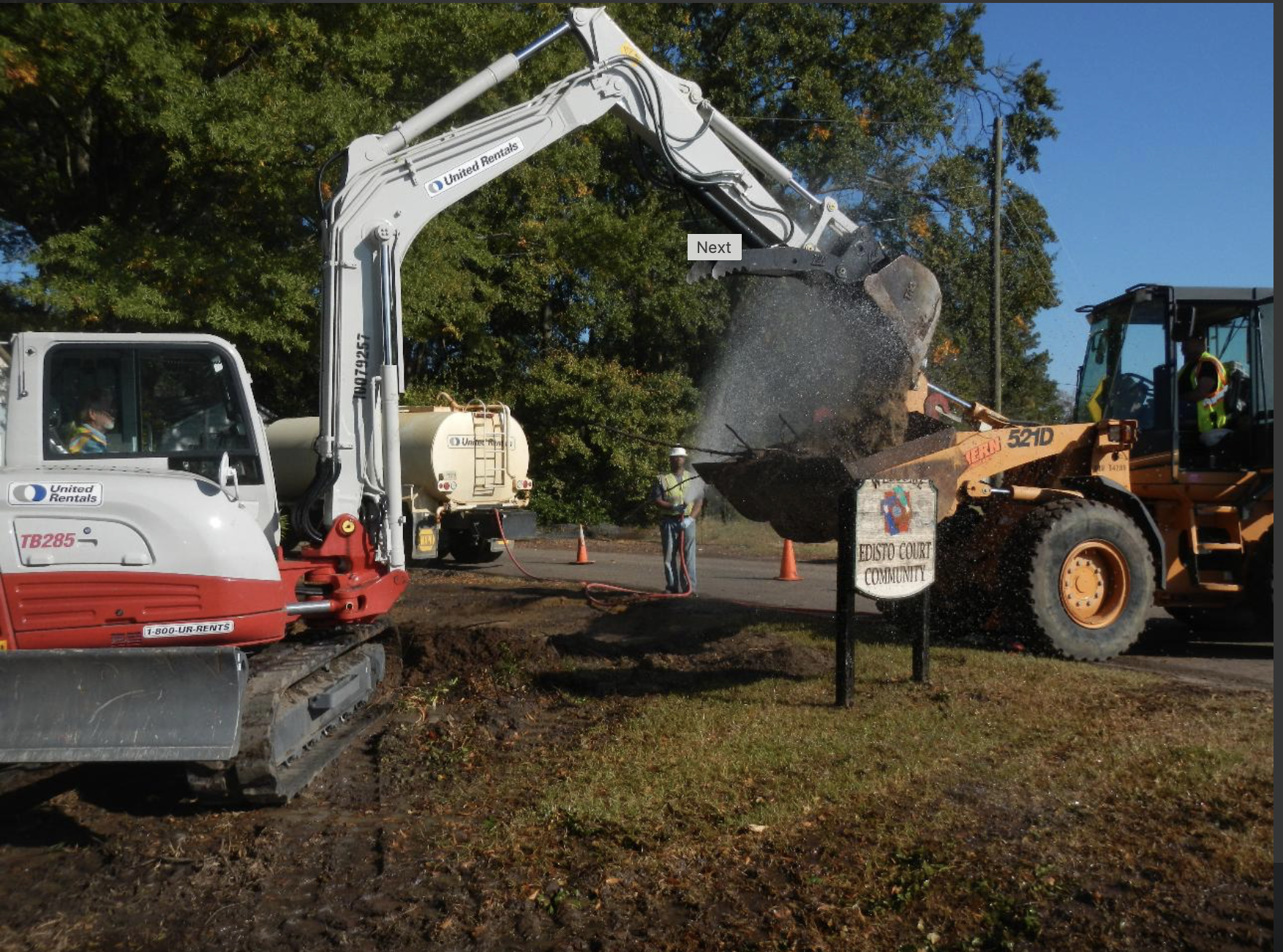
Excavation and dust suppression

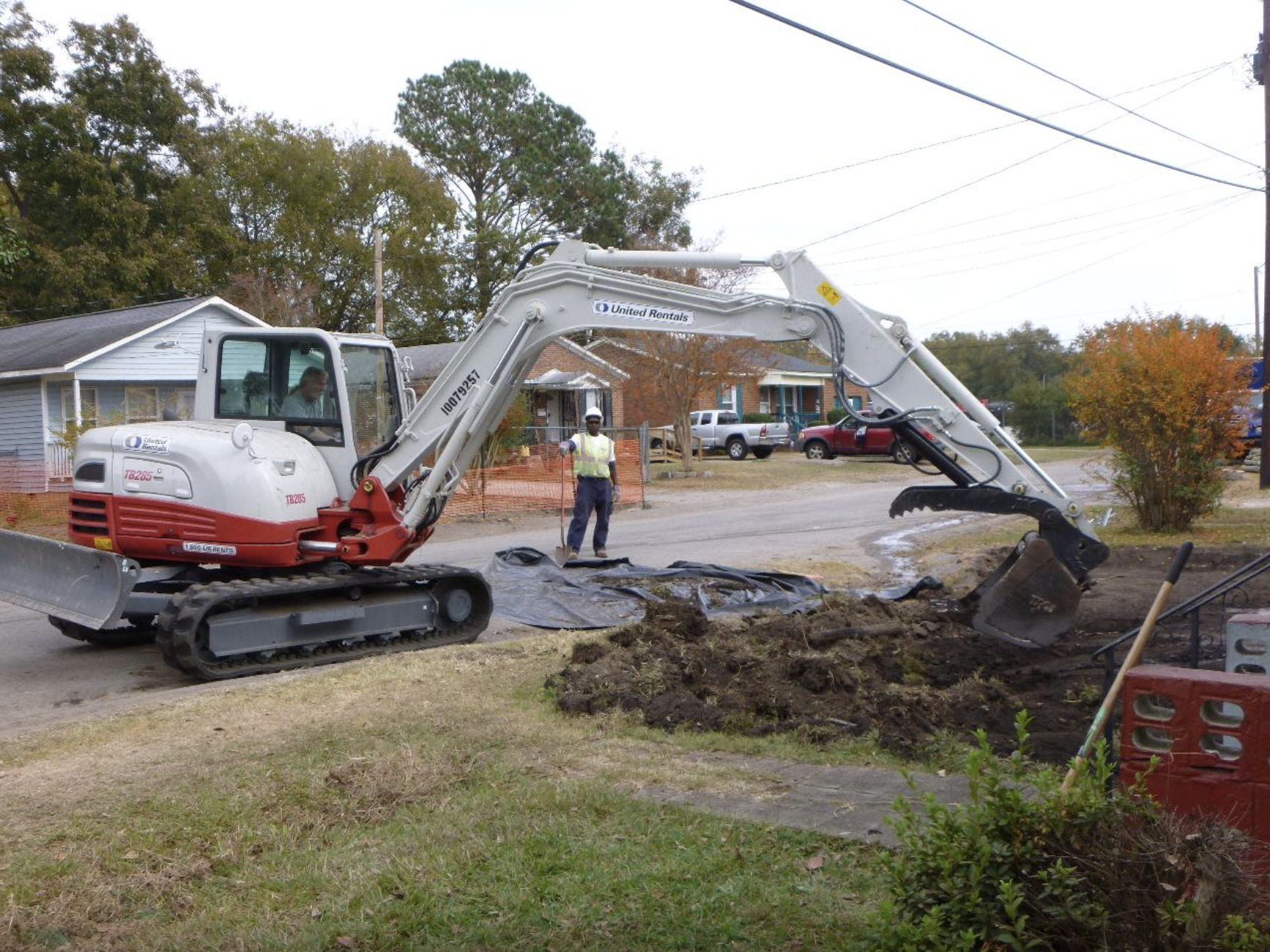
Excavating contaminated soil

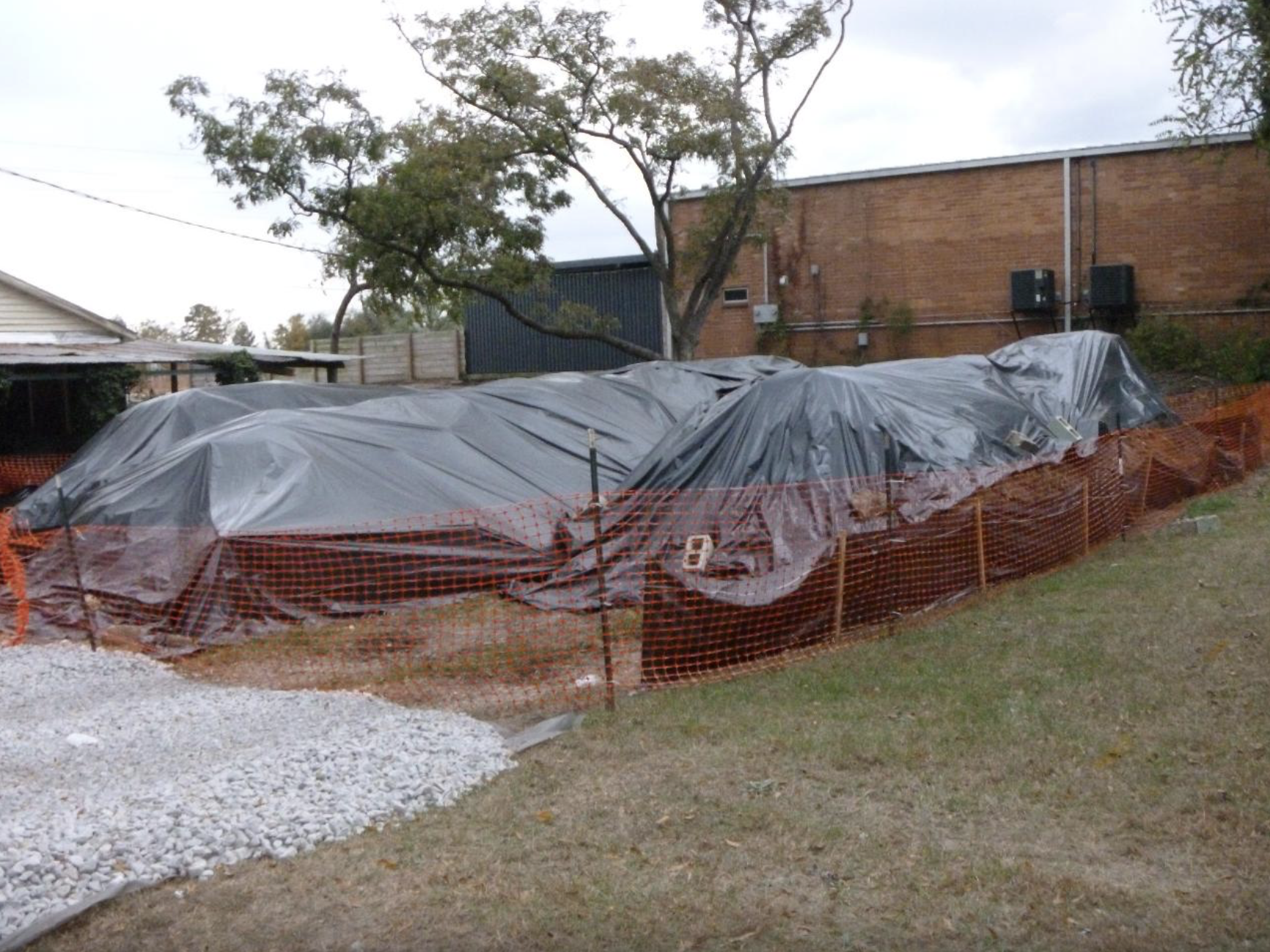
Temporary removal piles of contaminated soil

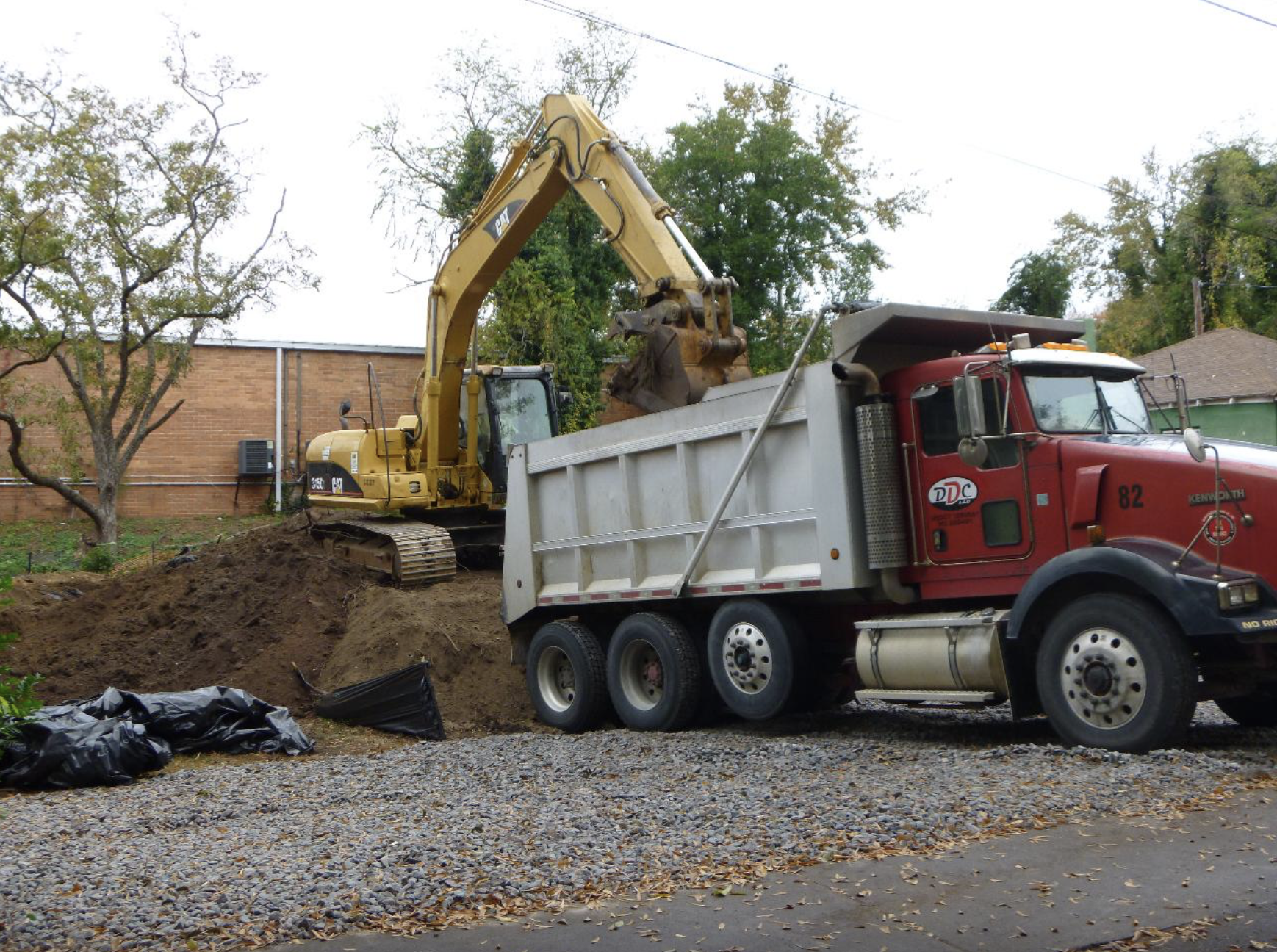
Hauling off contaminated dirt

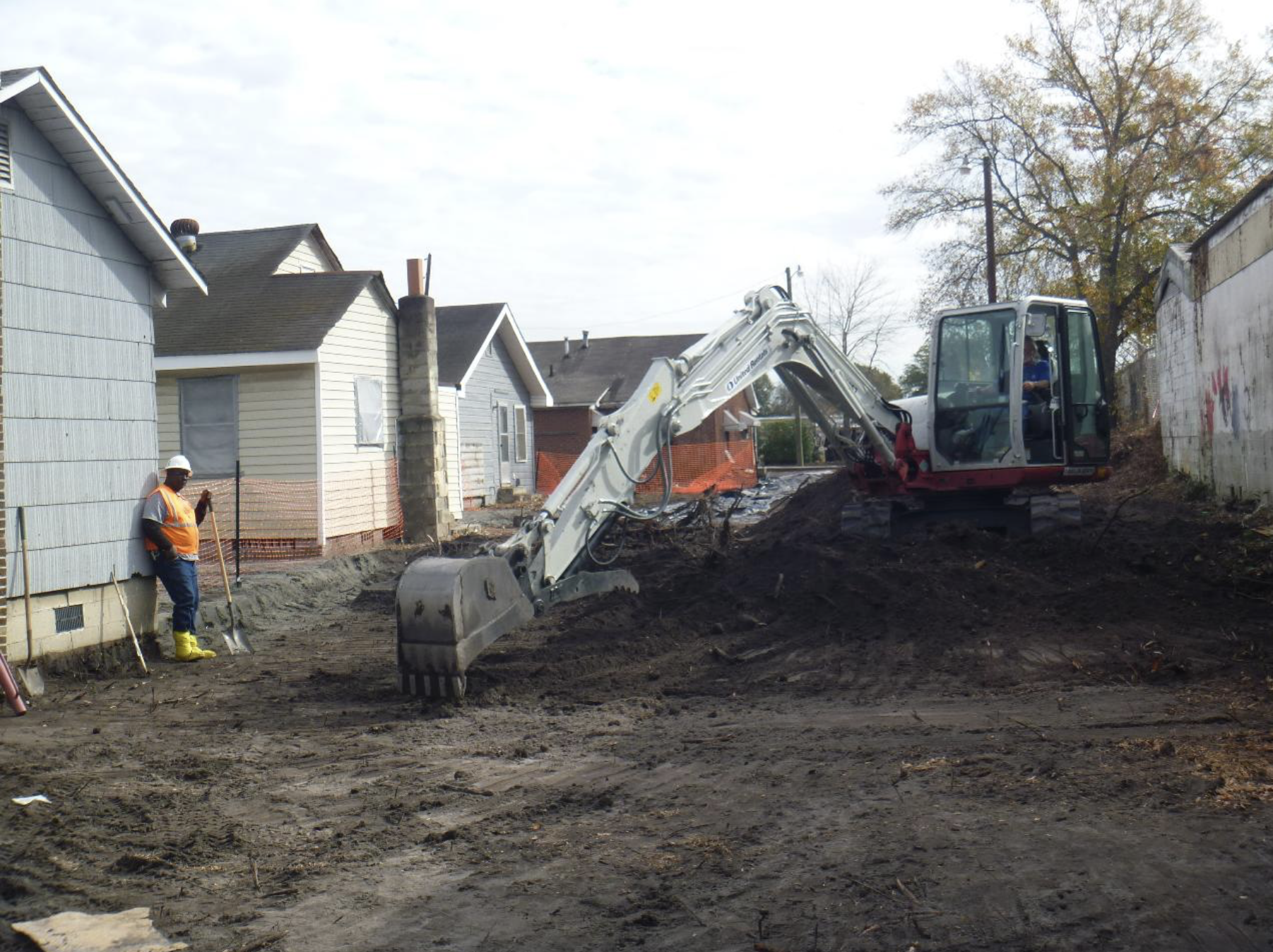
Backfilling clean soil

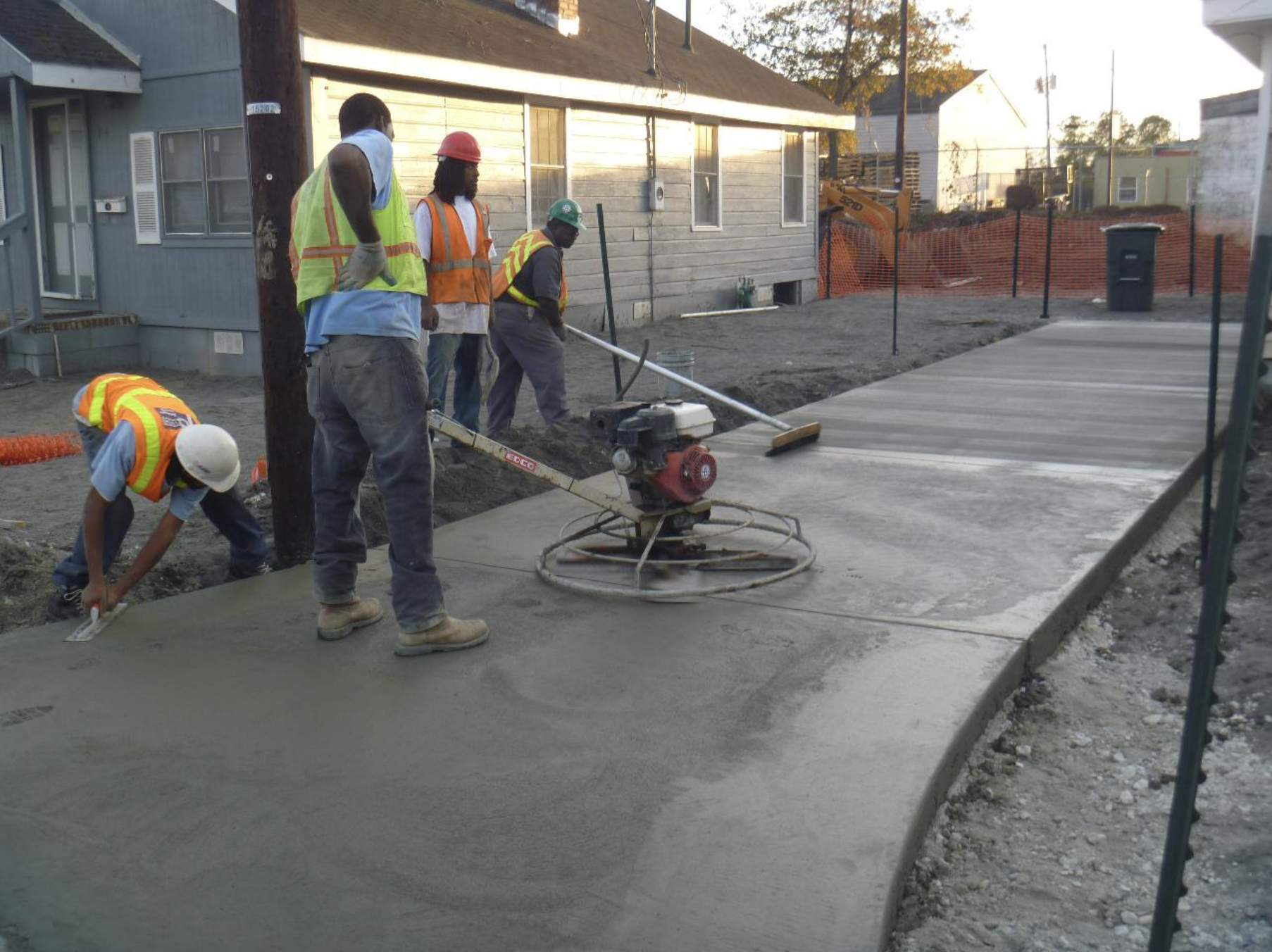
Restoring walkways after cleanup
