= Toledo City Paper =

The Toledo City Paper is an alternative newspaper established in 1997 in Toledo, Ohio, United States of America. It was co-founded by Collette Jacobs and Becky Harris, who also co-established a number of other local newspapers in Ohio and Michigan.
