= What's Up (weekly) =

- Type: Alternative weekly
- Format: Tabloid
- Owner(s): Investor Publications, Inc.
- Publisher: Secret Wherrett
- Editor: Victoria Molinar
- Founded: 1999
- Headquarters: 120 Porfirio Diaz; El Paso, TX 79902; USA
- Circulation: 30,000
- Price: Free
- Website: whatsuppub.com

What's Up is an alternative weekly newspaper circulated every Wednesday in El Paso, Texas, Ciudad Juárez, México, and nearby Las Cruces, New Mexico. The publication is a member of the Alternative Weekly Network. What's Up prints 30,000 issues and distributes every Wednesday at various locations throughout the region such as local restaurants, cafés, bars, youth centers and retail stores. What's Up is also delivered with its sister publication El Paso Inc., El Paso's business newspaper, to home subscribers. What's Up, encompassed by El Paso Inc., is a member of the Better Business Bureau.

== History ==
What's Up is published by Investor Publications, Inc., and was founded by Tom and Ellie Fenton and Debra Fraire. The publication promotes why El Paso is a great place to live and everything there is to do and see each week. Areas of content include food, cinema, theater, art, music, and nightlife in El Paso and the surrounding region.

What's Up was originally published on Thursdays. The print timeline was moved to Wednesdays in order to give readers more time to use the paper to make weekend plans.

== Special sections ==
What's Up publishes several special issues annually to cover notable El Paso events, including the Sun Bowl football game and Amigo Airsho. What's Up's reader's choice awards, the Best of the Best, also ends in a special issue after a nomination session and voting party every spring. In 2009,What's Up also launched What's Up for Kids, an annual comic-book sized newspaper written for El Paso youth, ages 8 to 13.

Syndicated content in What's Up includes News of the Weird and ¡Ask a Mexican!. Notable musician and native El Pasoan Jim Ward formerly wrote the column From The End Of This Pen, covering music, life, and El Paso itself.
