= View Magazine =

Canadian magazine in Ontario

VIEW is a free magazine located in Hamilton, Ontario, Canada. It was first published on January 5, 1995. VIEW covered news, culture, arts and entertainment.

The Magazine was voted "Best of Hamilton" by viewers of CHCH-DT
