= Columbia City Paper =

Alternative newspaper in South Carolina, US

- Type: Alternative weekly
- Format: Tabloid
- Owner: Independent
- Publisher: Paul Blake
- Founded: 2005
- Headquarters: Columbia, South Carolina, United States
- Circulation: 15,000
- Website: columbiacitypaper.com

Columbia City Paper was a free alternative newspaper in Columbia, South Carolina, featuring investigative articles, political commentary, humor, music, arts and entertainment coverage.

== History ==
Founded in August 2005 by Paul F. Blake the paper is based in Columbia, South Carolina. Columbia City Paper is distributed throughout South Carolina's capital city and its suburbs. Its circulation is 15,000 every other week. According to The State newspaper, "The publication continues to establish its voice, and possibly most important, people still talk about it." The newspaper was sued multiple times, most notably in 2007 as the case's punitive damages were reversed in appeals court in September, 2011. The newspaper continued to publish four years after aforementioned lawsuit. The publisher relocated to Vietnam in December, 2010 and decided to end publication with its 200th issue in September 2011, just prior to its six-year anniversary.
