= Virginia Beach Town Center =

Business district in Virginia Beach, Virginia, US

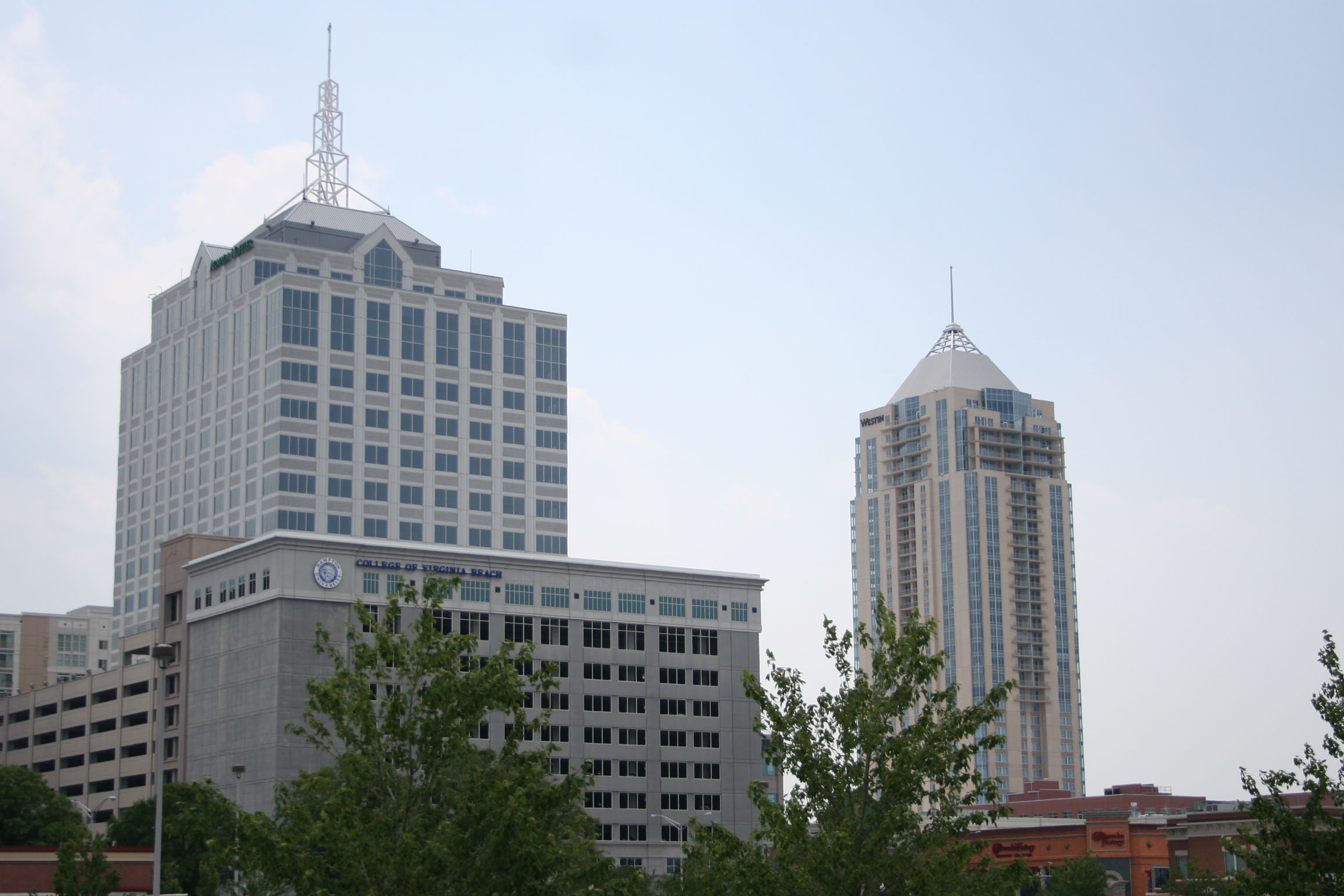
- Town Center development as of June, 2008
- Interactive map of Virginia Beach Town Center
- Location: Virginia Beach, Virginia
- Coordinates: 36°50′34″N 76°7′59.8″W
- Status: Mostly complete
- Groundbreaking: June 7, 2000
- Use: Mixed-Use
- Website: http://www.vabeachtowncenter.com/

Companies
- Architect: CMSS Architects
- Developer: Armada Hoffler
- Owner: Armada Hoffler, City of Virginia Beach

Technical details
- Cost: $500 million
- Size: 24 blocks
- Leasable area: 4,300,000 sq ft (400,000 m^{2}).
- Parking: 3600+

Virginia Beach Town Center is a group of offices, hotels, stores, and restaurants located in the central business district of Virginia Beach, Virginia.

== Location ==
The Virginia Beach Town Center is located in the Central Business District of Virginia Beach across the street from Pembroke Mall. Although the city had planned a "downtown" project for decades, clearance of land, and building construction did not begin until around 2000. The first building, the Armada Hoffler Tower, opened in 2003. Town Center is located 14 kilometers or 9 miles from the Virginia Beach Oceanfront and 16 kilometers or 10 miles from downtown Norfolk, Virginia. Also nearby to the Virginia Beach Town Center is Princess Anne High School, home to the International Baccalaureate academy.

== Services ==
The Virginia Beach Town Center has commercial space, living space, hotels, dining, shopping and entertainment. Major commercial tenants in Town Center include Armada Hoffler, HBA Architects, Troutman Sanders, Clark Nexsen, Divaris Real Estate. Restaurants include Keagan's Irish Pub, the Cheesecake Factory, Cold Stone Creamery, P. F. Chang's China Bistro, California Pizza Kitchen, Bravo!, Ruth's Chris Steakhouse, Quirks, Nando's, Taste, Cantina Laredo, and Tupelo Honey Cafe. Notable stores include Nike, Brooks Brothers, Lego, Anthropologie, Free People, Ann Taylor Loft, Lululemon Athletica, Origins, West Elm, Pottery Barn, Williams Sonoma, Ulta Beauty, Barnes and Noble, and a number of boutiques. Entertainment venues include the Sandler Center for the Performing Arts, the Zeiders American Dream Theater, and Apex Entertainment. Living spaces include The Westin, The Cosmopolitan Apartments, Encore 4505, and Premier Apartments. Pembroke Mall, located across Virginia Beach Blvd, is anchored by Target, Nordstrom Rack, REI, Kohl's, DSW, and The Fresh Market.

== Development ==
=== Phase I ===
Included the Armada Hoffler Tower, a Hilton Garden Inn, a Towne Bank office, parking garages, and surrounding office and retail. Phase I added 968,000 sq ft (89,900 m^{2}), and consisted of a $75 million private investment and a $25 million public investment.

=== Phase II ===
Included the Cosmopolitan Apartments, a public plaza, parking garages, the Apex Entertainment Building, (originally a Galyan's and then a Dick's Sporting Goods), and surrounding office and retail. Phase II added 1,248,300 sq ft (115,970 m^{2}) with a $90 million private investment and a $26 million public investment.

=== Phase III ===
Included the Westin Virginia Beach Town Center hotel and residences, Studio 56 Lofts, The Sandler Center for the Performing Arts, a 5-story office building, office, retail, and more parking. Phase II added 996,979 sq ft (92,622.4 m^{2}) with a $173 million private investment and a $28.8 million public investment.

=== Phase IV (On Hold) ===
Was scheduled to begin in the fourth quarter of 2008 but was moved to 2009. In the summer the Virginia Beach branch office of the Virginian Pilot, the Beacon Building, was cleared to make way for the Gateway Bank Tower; the paper's Virginia Beach operations moved nearby to the Westin Hotel building. Groundbreaking for the tower was to take place in 2010, then moved to early to mid-2011 but for unknown reasons the phase has been put on hiatus as of 2011. Phase IV and additional phases, if any, are scheduled to include an additional 1,630,000 sq ft (151,000 m^{2}) space. Ground broke on phase V in early 2013 and construction began in spring 2013. The developer has noted that Phase IV is still on hold and will begin after construction of phase V.

=== Phase V ===
Included 4525 Main Street Tower, Encore Apartments, and 23,000 SF of retail. Phase V added 21,900 m^{2} (236,000 sq ft) with an $84 million private investment and a $21 million public investment.

=== Phase VI ===
Included Premier Apartments, Premier retail, and the Zeiders American Dream Theater. Phase VI added 5,100 m^{2} (55,000 sq ft) with a $38 million private investment and a $4 million public investment.
