= Camp Sorghum =

POW camp, American Civil War

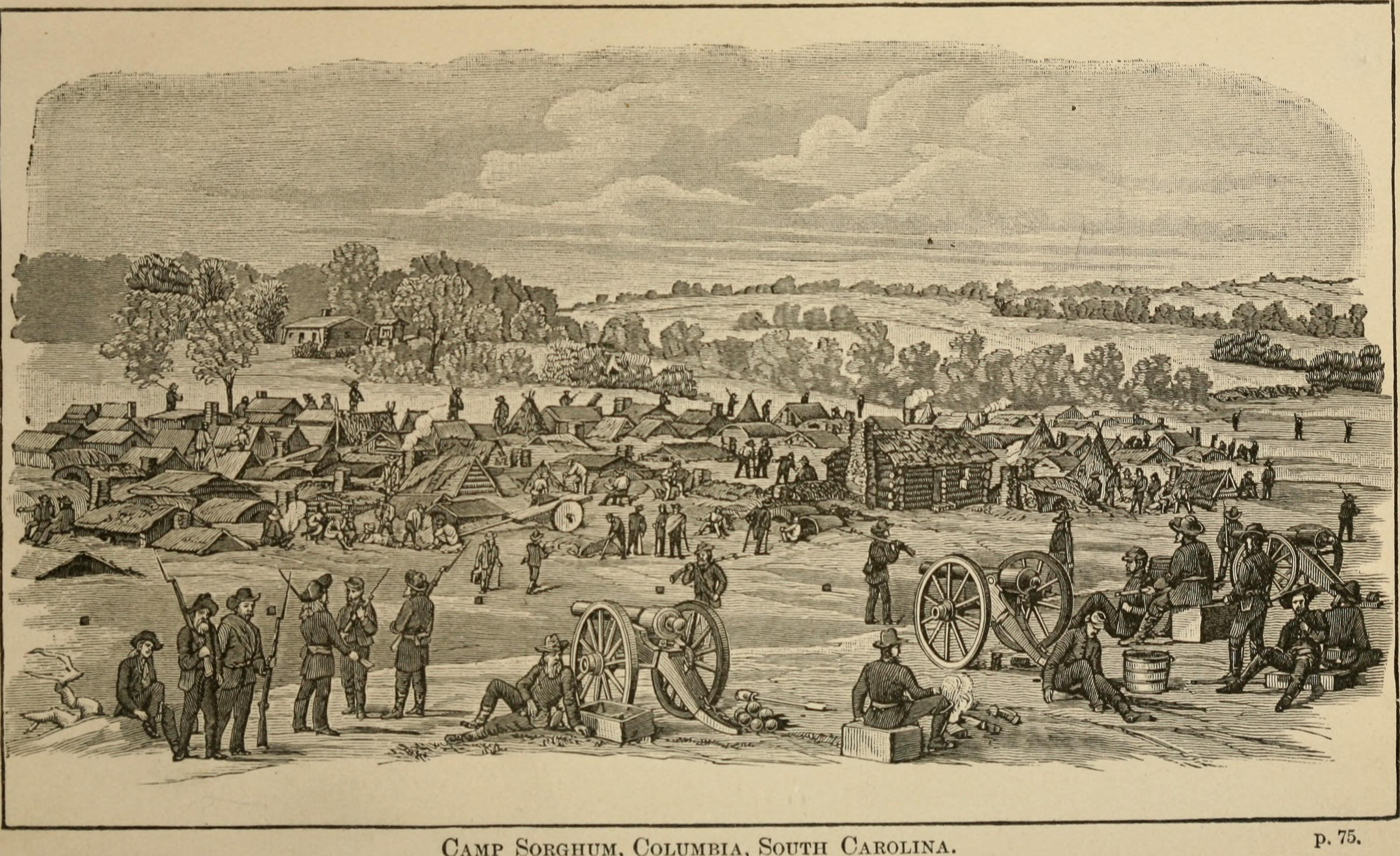
Camp Sorghum, Columbia, South Carolina.

Camp Sorghum was a Confederate States Army prisoner of war camp located in Columbia, South Carolina, during the American Civil War.

Established in late 1864 as a makeshift prison for approximately 1,400 Union officers, Camp Sorghum consisted of a 5-acre (20,000 m^{2}) tract of open field, without walls, fences, buildings, or any other facilities. A "deadline" (boundary line) was established by laying wood planks 10 feet (3.0 m) inside the camp's boundaries.

Rations consisted of cornmeal and sorghum syrup as the main staples in the diet; thus the camp became known as "Camp Sorghum". Due to the lack of any security features, escapes were common. Conditions were terrible, with little food, clothing, or medicine, and disease claimed a number of lives among both the prisoners and their guards.

The camp was the site of the imprisonment of S. H. M. Byers, as well as the location in which Byers created his two most famous works: the poem that lent its name to Sherman's March to the Sea, and The Song of Iowa. During his imprisonment at Camp Sorghum, Byers read a newspaper that had been smuggled into camp by a slave in a piece of bread. From that he learned of Sherman's March to the Sea, and the taking of Atlanta, Georgia. Byers wrote a poem about the March, which was set to music by fellow prisoner W. O. Rockwell. The song was smuggled out of the prison in the wooden leg of Lt. Daniel W. Tower, and became an immediate hit in the north.

The prisoners of Camp Sorghum were eventually transferred to the property of the state mental asylum in Columbia sometime before the city was captured in February 1865. Most of the POWs were removed from Columbia on February 12, 1865, as William Tecumseh Sherman's Union Army approached the city. Byers however managed to hide in the attic of the asylum, and became one of the first to greet the Union Army upon its entrance to Columbia.

== See also ==
- List of Civil War POW prisons and camps
- Saluda Factory Historic District
