= Babcock Building, South Carolina State Hospital =

- U.S. National Register of Historic Places
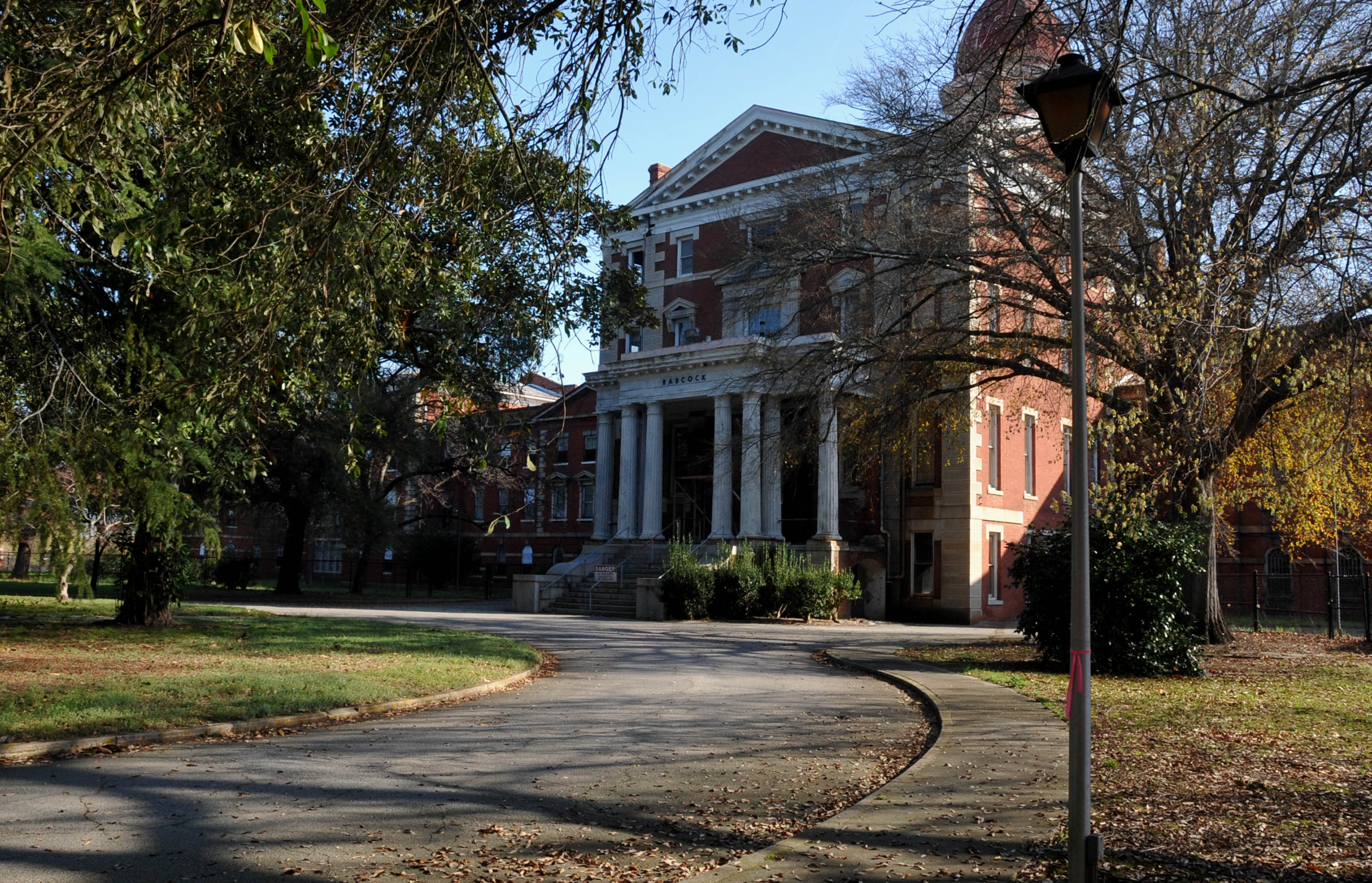
- The Babcock Building in 2012

- Location within South Carolina Location within the United States
- Location: Columbia, South Carolina
- Coordinates: 34°0′51″N 81°01′49″W
- Built: 1858-1885
- Architect: George E. Walker; Samuel Sloan; Gustavus T. Berg
- Architectural style: Italian Renaissance Revival
- NRHP reference No.: 81000570
- Added to NRHP: October 30, 1981

The Babcock Building is a historic structure located off Bull St. in Columbia, South Carolina. It was added to the National Register of Historic Places on October 30, 1981. The building was the second to house patients on the campus of South Carolina State Hospital, after the Mills Building proved to be insufficient in space to house its patients.

On September 12, 2020, the Babcock Building was the site of a three-alarm fire which collapsed the building's dome and gutted the interior. The building's reconstruction and renovation plans were completed in 2023, and the building is currently divided into 208 apartments.

== Construction and history ==
The first section of Babcock was designed by George E. Walker in 1858. Walker died before the south wing was complete. The north wing was overseen by Gustavus T. Berg. The central portion, bearing the name and serving as the main entrance, was designed by architect Samuel Sloan. The structure was completed in 1885 after four building campaigns. Construction delays were due to funding and the American Civil War. Through the years, additions were made to the building, including stairwells whose style and materials do not match that of the rest of the building. Several buildings were constructed directly adjacent to Babcock, but have since been removed.

The Babcock Building was scheduled to be renovated into apartment buildings for Columbia's planned Bull Street District. The state had sold 143 out of the property's 181 acres for $18.5 million. On December 13, 2018, the building's roof caught fire. The state of South Carolina paid for repairs which may cost up to $400,000.

On September 12, 2020, a fire broke out in the building. Fire crews arrived at approximately 6:30 a.m. The fire chief reported that the three-alarm fire had spread through all three floors of the vacant building and gutted the interior. The building's dome, a longtime Columbia landmark, collapsed in the fire. The owner received crucial loans to continue rebuilding and renovating the structure. It was initially expected to be completed in 2022 though it was actually completed in 2023. The building hosts 208 apartments and is part of a plan to reinvigorate the Bull Street District.

== Style ==
Following the Kirkbride Plan, Babcock was designed not to include subterranean housing of patients. Each wing of the structure is 3–4 stories with rooms broken up into manageable wards. For its time, the building was heavily fireproofed. It also utilized, for a time, gas lighting. The building did not completely comply with Kirkbride standards. Babcock did not have staggered blocks within its wings, as would be seen in a true Kirkbride. South Carolina Lunatic Asylum head physician Dr. Trezevant successfully argued that the staggering of blocks would not allow the ventilation needed for the warm southern climate. However, against Trezevant's wishes, the halls were built in a double-range, with rooms on either side of the hallway.

Babcock is noted as a particularly fine example of Italian Renaissance Revival architecture. Walker was previously known for his work in Romanesque and Gothic Revival. Though he died before even his own section was complete, his work became the basis for the rest of the building's construction. Berg's northern wing mirrors the design of the original in many ways.

Sloan's central section is crowned with a twelve-sided cupola whose red domed roof can be seen from far across the city. This section also featured the operating rooms, dormitories for staff, offices, and a chapel. Dining halls were added to the eastern end of the central block in 1916.

== Historic uses ==
- Health care
- Filming location for Chattahoochee

== See also ==
- Mills Building, South Carolina State Hospital
- Kirkbride Plan
