= BullStreet District =

Mixed-use development in Columbia, South Carolina

Coordinates: 34°01′07″N 81°01′48″W

The BullStreet District
- Williams Building (foreground) and WestLawn Building (background) at night
- Interactive map of The BullStreet District
- Location: Columbia, SC
- Address: 801 Elmwood Avenue, Columbia, SC 29201
- Status: In Development
- Groundbreaking: January 6, 2015
- Use: Mixed-Use Development
- Website: bullstreetsc.com

Companies
- Developer: Hughes Development Corporation

Technical details
- Size: 3.3 million commercial square feet 3,558 residential units

The BullStreet District (also called the Bull Street District or known simply as BullStreet) is a 181-acre mixed-use redevelopment of the South Carolina State Hospital campus in Columbia, South Carolina. It is a public-private partnership between Greenville based Hughes Development Corporation and the City of Columbia located east of the intersection between Bull Street and Elmwood Avenue. The District is home to multiple office buildings, retail, residential, and event spaces, including Segra Park, home of the MiLB Columbia Fireflies, the Single-A affiliate of the Kansas City Royals. In total, BullStreet is zoned for 3.3 million commercial square feet and 3,558 residential units of development.

== History ==
The South Carolina State Hospital was established in 1821 as one of the first mental health hospitals in the United States. As patient treatment evolved, the need for the buildings on the campus diminished, and South Carolina began planning to sell the campus in 2004. In 2010, the state's Department of Mental Health contracted with Hughes Development for the sale of the campus after being unable to sell the site for several years. Hughes Development, who is considered the architect of the redevelopment of downtown Greenville, SC, broke ground on the redevelopment of BullStreet on January 6, 2015.

== Planning and development ==
In 2004, then Governor Mark Sanford worked with the South Carolina General Assembly to begin the process of selling the 165-acre central campus. In 2005, state and city officials hired renowned-architect Andres Duany to lead a weeklong design charrette focused on New Urbanism. The principles of the Duany-led charrette were incorporated into the BullStreet form-based code adopted in 2012.

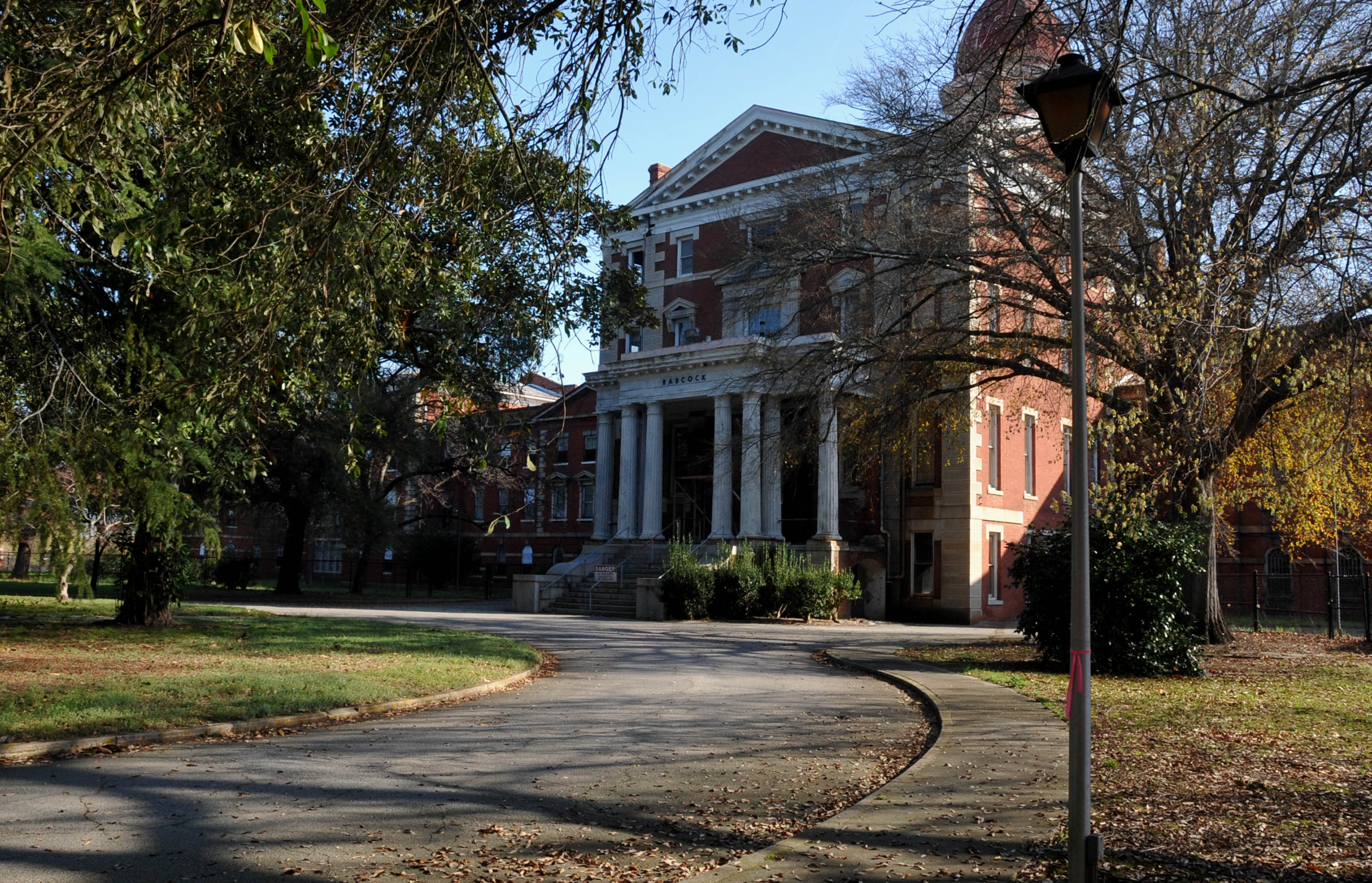
Babcock Building, a former state hospital building which currently houses apartments

=== Babcock Building ===
The Babcock Building is an adaptive reuse of the main asylum building into 208 apartments. The building is on the National Register of Historic Places and despite suffering a major fire in 2020, the building was fully renovated and opened to the public in 2023.

=== University of South Carolina Health Sciences Campus ===
Located on 16-acres inside the BullStreet District, the University of South Carolina is constructing a new health sciences campus. Current plans include a new building for their medical school to open in 2027 and a specialty hospital focused on treating brain diseases and the nervous system.

=== Page Ellington Park ===
A 20-acre park opened at BullStreet in 2021 that features walking trails, a dog park, picnic shelters, and several water features, including a 2-acre pond and over 1,600 linear feet of daylighted stream. The park was named for Page Ellington, a former-slave who became a community leader and self-taught architect, contributing to the design of several buildings on the State Hospital Campus.

=== Retail, residential, office and other uses ===
BullStreet is home to national and local retailers, like REI, Starbucks, Tupelo Honey Cafe, and Iron Hill Brewery. Two newly constructed office buildings house companies like AECOM, Capgemini, Scout Motors, Ogletree Deakins. Other residential offerings at BullStreet include the 267-unit Bennet Apartments, 120-unit Merrill Gardens residences, and TownPark at BullStreet. Several event venues are also located at BullStreet, including Central Energy and The Laundry.

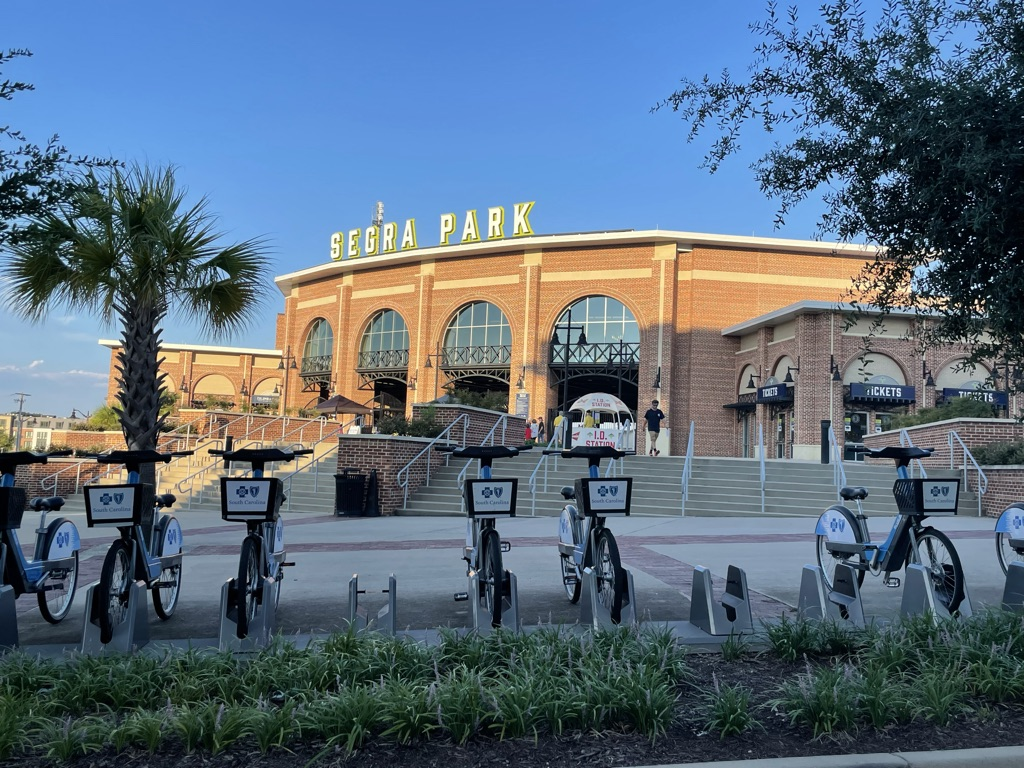
Segra Park, home stadium of the Columbia Fireflies

=== Segra Park ===
Segra Park is a 9,077-seat multi-use venue that is home to the Single-A affiliate of the Kansas City Royals of Major League Baseball, the Columbia Fireflies. Formerly known as Spirit Communications Park, Segra Park was awarded Ballpark of the Year in its first season in 2016 and Ballpark of the Decade in 2020 by online publication, Ballpark Digest. Additionally, in 2024, the Columbia Fireflies were named Single-A Organization of the Year by MiLB.

=== Food Hall ===
In December 2025, Columbia's first food hall opened at BullStreet - Gather COLA. The food hall features 10 food vendors, 3 retail offerings, 1 cocktail bar and 1 brewery/taproom.

=== Publix Supermarket ===
Publix will open a 50,000+ sq. ft. store at BullStreet, with groundbreaking scheduled for summer of 2026.
