= South Carolina State Hospital =

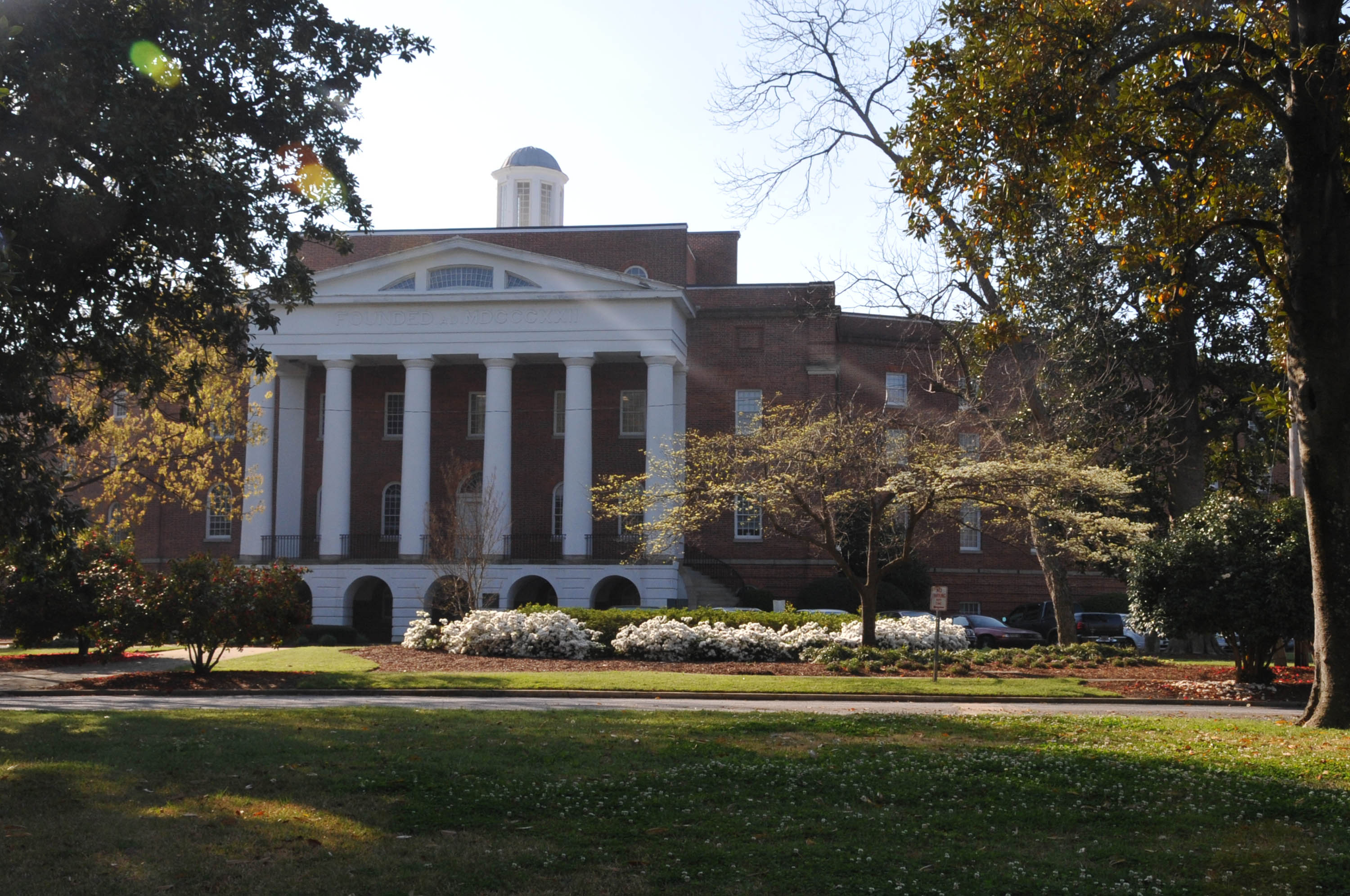
- Mills building in 2012

Geography
- Location: South Carolina, United States

Organization
- Type: Specialist

Services
- Beds: 410
- Speciality: Psychiatric

History
- Opened: 1827
- Closed: December 2015

Links
- Lists: Hospitals in South Carolina
- Mills Building, South Carolina State Hospital
- U.S. National Register of Historic Places
- U.S. National Historic Landmark
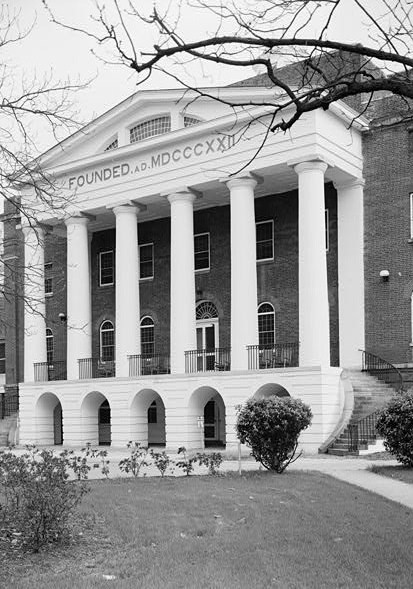
- Mills Building, South Carolina State Hospital in 1960

- Location within South Carolina Location within the United States
- Location: 2100 Bull St., Columbia, South Carolina
- Coordinates: 34°0′52″N 81°2′0″W
- Built: 1822
- Architect: Robert Mills; Samuel Sloan
- NRHP reference No.: 70000890

Significant dates
- Added to NRHP: June 5, 1970
- Designated NHL: November 7, 1973

The South Carolina State Hospital was a publicly funded state-run psychiatric hospital in Columbia, South Carolina. Founded in 1821 as the South Carolina Lunatic Asylum, it was one of the first public mental hospitals established in the United States. The Mills Building, its first building, was designed by early American architect Robert Mills, and is a National Historic Landmark. The hospital had more than 1,000 patients in 1900, but with the transition of mental health facilities to community settings, it closed in the late 1990s. While buildings on the campus were temporarily used for inpatient services into the early 2000s, they were not part of the State Hospital, but other inpatient facilities of the agency (e.g., Morris Village Alcohol and Drug Treatment Center and G. Werber Bryan Psychiatric Hospital). Several buildings on its campus housed offices and storage facilities of the state's Department of Mental Health until approximately 2014. In October 2014, the Department sold the first parcels of the property into private ownership and received the first sale proceeds ($1.5 Million). The William S. Hall Psychiatric Institute (an inpatient psychiatric facility for children and adolescents) remained on the campus until 2015, when it moved to a new facility on Department's Northeast Columbia Campus. As of January 2021, 100% of the South Carolina State Hospital (also known as "Bull Street") property had been transferred to private ownership. Proceeds from the sale of the Bull Street property must be used to benefit patients of the Agency. As of August 2020, the SC Mental Health Commission had authorized the expenditure of $10 million of the proceeds for the development of additional community housing for patients.

== History ==
The South Carolina Lunatic Asylum was authorized by state legislation in 1821, and was the second such state hospital (after Virginia's) to be authorized. Its original building, designed by Robert Mills and featuring the latest innovations in fire resistance and patient security, was built between 1822 and 1827. The hospital was at first only open to paying patients, with indigent patient costs billed to the government of the region from which they came. Admission was for the most part limited to whites, although some African-Americans (including slaves) were admitted before 1848, when their admission was formally authorized.

The Hospital served briefly as a prisoner of war camp in 1865, absorbing the prisoners of former Camp Sorghum. Among those imprisoned there was S. H. M. Byers, who hid in the Hospital's attic when it was evacuated as the Capture of Columbia drew near.

The hospital's facilities were enlarged, in part by expansion of the Mills building, and in part by the construction of new buildings on the campus. In 1892, the hospital opened a nursing school (which closed in 1950), and in 1896 it changed its name to the South Carolina State Hospital for the Insane. Its campus at capacity in 1910 (and like many such facilities nationwide, underfunded, understaffed, and its patients not well cared-for), a second campus was opened for African-Americans north of Columbia. Known first as the Palmetto State Hospital then later named Crafts-Farrow Hospital, its campus served for many years as a geriatric care facility, and now houses multiple divisions of the Department of Mental Health, including Public Safety, Training and Research, Information Technology, Food Services, Print Shop, etc.

Ongoing issues with staffing, funding, and patient conditions persisted in the 20th century, and the state began transitioning mental health care into community settings in 1920. Legal action surrounding patient care and funding in its hospital facilities in the 1980s resulted in a more focused effort to reduce the hospital population. In 1996, the two campuses were consolidated, with 410 beds. Buildings no longer used for patient care, for a time housed offices of the state Department of Mental Health. The Department of Mental Health ended its use of the site in December 2015, when the William S. Hall Children's institute relocated to another campus. On September 12, 2020, a fire destroyed a portion of the central Babcock Building. However, developers have moved forward with renovation to apartments.

By 2021, most of the buildings that comprised the original campus were sold to private developers as part of the Bull Street District revitalization project. Only the original Mills Building and the later constructed Jarrett Building are still owned by the State of South Carolina, housing the Department of Health and Environmental Control until it was dissolved in July 2024. In early 2026, the Mills and Jarrett buildings became the permanent headquarters of the South Carolina Office of Resilience.

== See also ==
- BullStreet District – a 181-acre mixed-use redevelopment of the South Carolina State Hospital campus
- List of National Historic Landmarks in South Carolina
- National Register of Historic Places listings in Columbia, South Carolina
