= Saluda Factory Historic District =

Archaeological site in South Carolina, United States

- U.S. National Register of Historic Places
- U.S. Historic district
- Location within South Carolina Location within the United States
- Location: Along Saluda River SE of jct. of I 126 and I 26, West Columbia, South Carolina
- Coordinates: 34°00′29.16″N 81°5′7.584″W
- Area: 110 acres (45 ha)
- NRHP reference No.: 73001718
- Added to NRHP: May 25, 1973

Saluda Factory Historic District is a national historic district located at West Columbia, Lexington County, South Carolina. It encompasses three contributing sites associated with the development of the area along the Saluda River; Saluda Factory, Camp Sorghum and old State Road. The Saluda Factory ruins consist of the granite foundation and sluices from a textile mill that operated on the river between the years 1834 and 1884. The Camp Sorghum site was the site of a Confederate prison camp. It held 1,300 Union soldiers, who were confined there from the autumn of 1864 to February 1865, and subsequently transferred to Charlotte, North Carolina. The old State Road, originally the Cherokee Path, bounded Saluda Factory and Camp Sorghum on the east.

It was listed on the National Register of Historic Places in 1973.
