= Sandler Center for the Performing Arts =

The Sandler Center for the Performing Arts
- Sandler Center
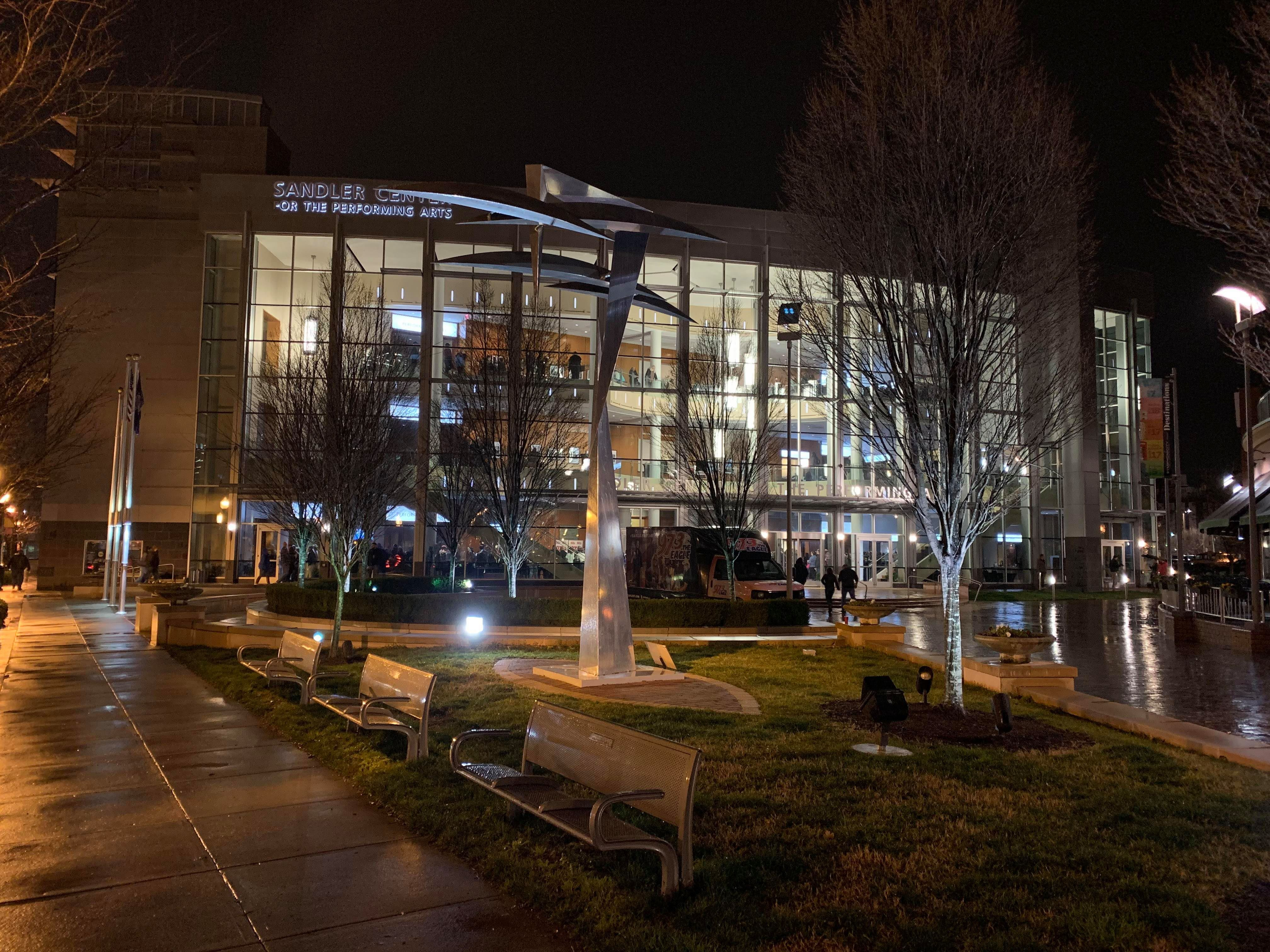

- Location within Virginia
- Address: 201 Market St
- Location: Virginia Beach, Virginia
- Coordinates: 36.8422042°N 76.13773°W
- Owner: City of Virginia Beach Office of Cultural Affairs
- Operator: Spectra Venue Management
- Seating type: Reserved seating
- Capacity: 1,308
- Type: Music venue

Construction
- Opened: November 3, 2007

Website
- www.sandlercenter.org

The Sandler Center for the Performing Arts is a $47.5 million performing arts theater with 1,308 seats located in Virginia Beach, Virginia, United States in Town Center. Commonly known as the Sandler Center, the building opened on November 3, 2007. It has been operated by Spectra Venue Management since its opening. Named after Hampton Roads businessmen, philanthropists, and brothers Steve and Art Sandler. In addition to hosting concerts, comedians, forums, military events and other events, local resident companies call the Sandler Center home: Ballet Virginia, Virginia Symphony Orchestra, Virginia Musical Theatre, Virginia Arts Festival, Virginia Beach Forum, Virginia Beach Chorale, Tidewater Winds, and Symphonicity.

In addition to the 1,308 seat performance hall, the Sandler Center has various rooms throughout the building. The Miller Studio Theatre is a 2,200-square-foot room that can fit 200 (standing room only) to 125 people (seated). This theatre is equipped with ballet bars, sprung floor, and its own lighting. The Bill and Anne Wood Founders Room is a 900-square-foot room that has a private terrace overlooking Virginia Beach Town Center. This room can fit 60 (standing room only) to 50 people (seated). The Sandler Center also has two carpeted classrooms on the second floor equipped with movable tables, chairs, and podiums. Each floor has its own lobby looking out on to the Sandler Center plaza. The grand lobby is 5,200-square-feet.

The Sandler Center is also home to the Sandler Center Foundation. The Foundation is involved in education, community outreach programs and performance underwriting. The Sandler Center Foundation partners with Virginia Arts Festival to underwrite performers such as Renee Fleming, Bernstein on Broadway, and Tony Bennett. Proceeds from Ynot Wednesdays, an outdoor summer concert series, benefits the Sandler Center Foundation. From 2008-2018, $289,000 was donated to the Sandler Center Foundation.

== History ==
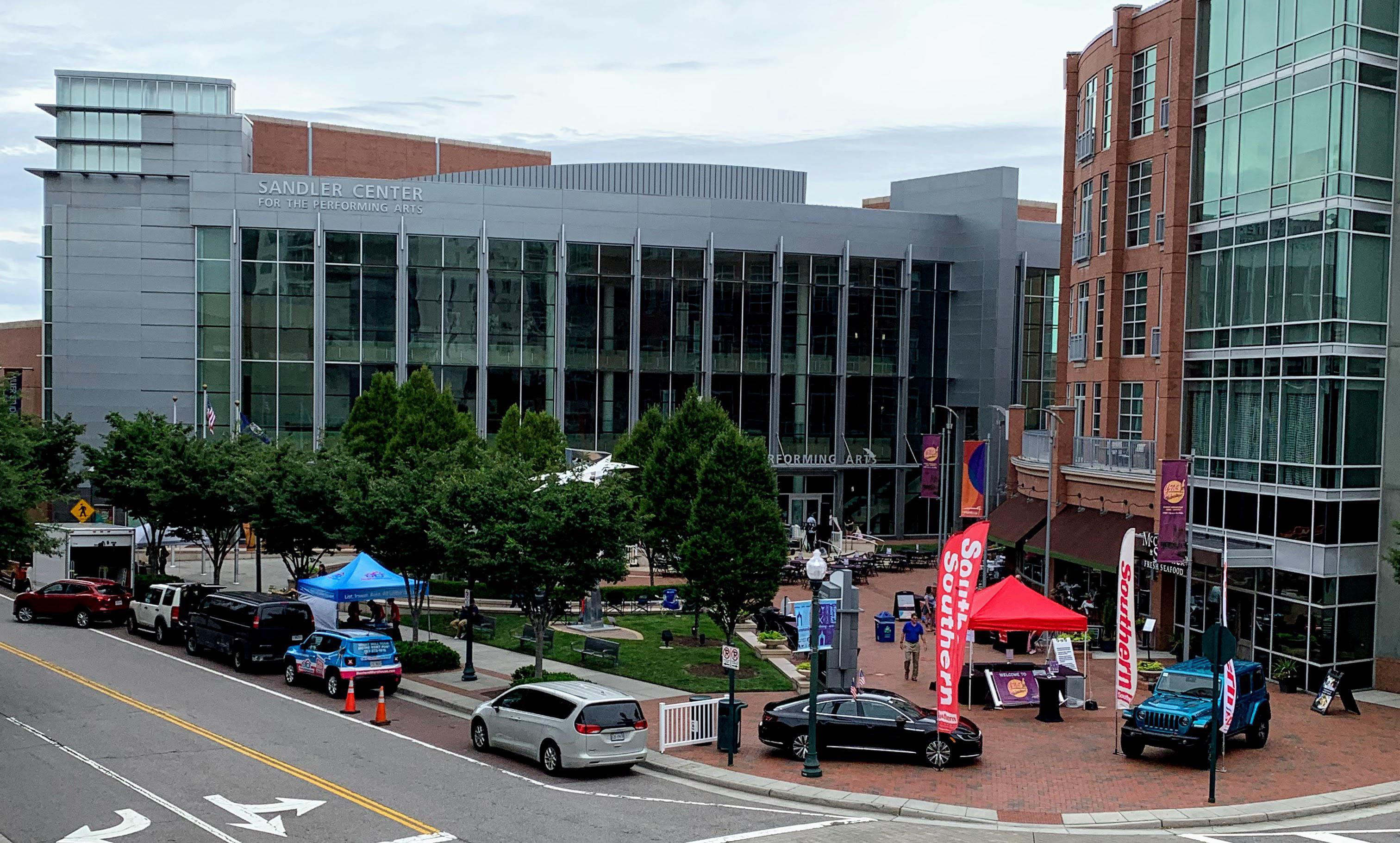
Sandler Center Street View

In 2001, the Virginia Beach City Council began plans to build its own cultural center. The Council began plans to replace the 1000-seat Pavilion Theatre. More than 300 workers and 35 subcontractors had a hand in the construction.

The Sandler Center for the Performing Arts was dedicated in November 2007. Itzhak Perlman was the first artist to perform at the Sandler Center on November 3, 2007.

=== Volunteers ===
Over 200 volunteers work at the Sandler Center. The estimated national value of each volunteer hour is $25.43, as of 2018. This allows the City of Virginia Beach to save on average 500,000 dollars each year.

== Noteworthy performers ==
- Itzhak Perlman
- Renée Fleming
- Chris Botti
- Disney Frozen Jr.
- Family Feud Live Celebrity Edition
- Melissa Etheridge
- Tony Bennett
- B. B. King
- Willie Nelson
- Gladys Knight
- Wynton Marsalis
- Savion Glover
