= S. H. M. Byers =

American soldier and poet (1838–1933)

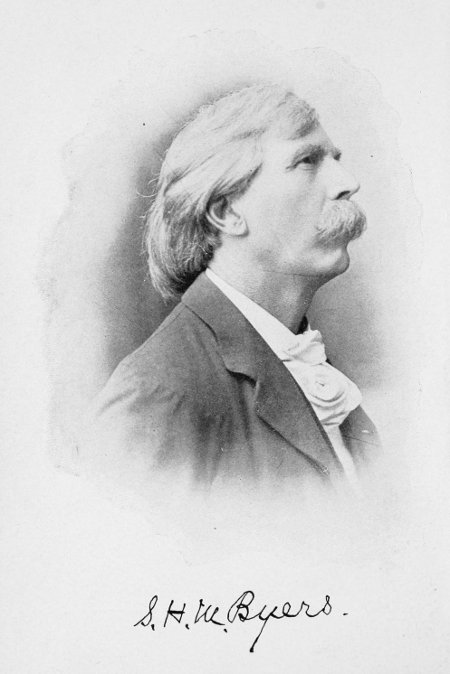
- Born: July 23, 1838; Pulaski, Pennsylvania, U.S.
- Died: May 24, 1933 (aged 94); Los Angeles, California, U.S.
- Occupation: Poet
- Known for: Coining "Sherman's March to the Sea"; Writing "The Song of Iowa"
- Military career
- Allegiance: United States
- Branch: Union Army
- Service years: 1840–1853; 1861–1884
- Rank: Brevet major
- Unit: 5th Iowa Infantry Regiment

Samuel Hawkins Marshall Byers (July 23, 1838 – May 24, 1933) was an American soldier and poet who wrote the poem "Sherman's March to the Sea", which was the origin of the eponymous term. Byers served in the 5th Iowa Infantry Regiment. He found success in a post-war writing career, including many poems about his native Iowa, including "The Song of Iowa", which was declared as Iowa's state song in 1911.

== Early life and education ==
Byers was born in Pulaski, Pennsylvania, on July 23, 1838; his mother died shortly after. He moved with his father to Iowa, in 1851, ending up in Oskaloosa by 1853. He studied to be a lawyer under an Oskaloosa attorney, earning admittance to the Iowa bar in 1861.

== Career ==
Byers' budding law career was cut short by the outbreak of the American Civil War in early 1861. Byers signed up for service with the 5th Iowa Infantry, and saw battle at the Battle of Iuka, the siege of Vicksburg, and in the Chattanooga campaign. He was captured at the Battle of Missionary Ridge in November 1863, along with about 80 others from his regiment. He was first imprisoned at Libby Prison, spending seven months there. He then was sent to a camp in Macon, Georgia, before escaping. He was recaptured and sent first to Charleston, South Carolina, before ending up at Camp Sorghum outside the city of Columbia, South Carolina. He escaped Camp Sorghum, but was again recaptured and sent back to Camp Sorghum. The prisoners of Camp Sorghum were eventually transferred to the property of the state mental asylum in Columbia.

During his imprisonment at Camp Sorghum, Byers read a newspaper that had been smuggled into camp by a slave in a piece of bread. From that he learned of Sherman's March to the Sea, and the taking of Atlanta, Georgia. Byers wrote a poem about the March, which was set to music by fellow prisoner W. O. Rockwell. The song was smuggled out of the prison in the wooden leg of Lt. Daniel W. Tower, and became an immediate hit in the north. Byers' poem coined the common name for Sherman's March to the Sea.

Most of the prisoners of war in Columbia were removed from the city on February 12, 1865, as the Union Army under William T. Sherman approached. But Byers hid in the attic of the building the prisoners were being held in. Byers thus became one of the first people to greet the Union Army when it captured Columbia on February 17. When Sherman entered the city around noon, Byers went up to Sherman and handed him a small slip of paper, telling Sherman to read it at his leisure. Sherman read the paper later that afternoon as he set up headquarters. On it he found Byers' poem, which moved Sherman. He immediately promoted Byers to a member of his staff, and the two formed a lifelong friendship.

After service on Sherman's staff, Byers was tasked with returning to Washington, where he gave the first first-hand account about Sherman's victories in the Carolinas. The war ended soon thereafter.

== Post-war life ==
After his wartime service, Byers became a writer, and then a diplomat. He was American consul to Switzerland from 1869 to 1884 (a separate position from that of Ambassador). He wrote for Harper's and The Magazine of American History. He was a prolific author, he wrote Switzerland and the Swiss and Twenty Years in Europe, drawing on his diplomatic service. His works on the Civil War included What I Saw in Dixie: Or Sixteen Months in Rebel Prisons, Iowa in Wartime, With Fire and Sword, and contributions to the Annals of Iowa. He also wrote several volumes of poetry, with many poems about his native Iowa. His poem The Song of Iowa was adopted as the state song of Iowa in 1911. His idea of turning the poem into a song came about after he heard Confederate soldiers playing "Maryland, My Maryland" to the tune of "O Tannenbaum" outside his military prison cell.

Byers moved to Los Angeles in his later years and wrote poetry for the Los Angeles Times. He died there on May 24, 1933 and is buried in Oskaloosa, Iowa.
