= Cantina Laredo =

US-based restaurant chain

- Founded: 1984
- Headquarters: Dallas, Texas
- Website: http://www.cantinalaredo.com/

Cantina Laredo is a Mexican restaurant chain headquartered in Dallas, Texas, that is owned by Consolidated Restaurant Operations, Inc. The company was founded in 1984. The main training restaurant is located in Frisco, Texas.
