= The Song of Iowa =

Regional anthem of Iowa

- Regional anthem of Iowa
- Lyrics: S. H. M. Byers, 1867
- Music: Lauriger Horatius
- Adopted: March 1911

Audio sample
- "The Song of Iowa" (instrumental): file; help

"The Song of Iowa" is the regional anthem of the U.S. state of Iowa, written by S. H. M. Byers in 1867 and adopted as the official state song by the Iowa State Legislature on March 20, 1911. The song is set to the tune "O Tannenbaum" and Byers' lyrics' theme is centered on his love and praise for Iowa.

== History ==
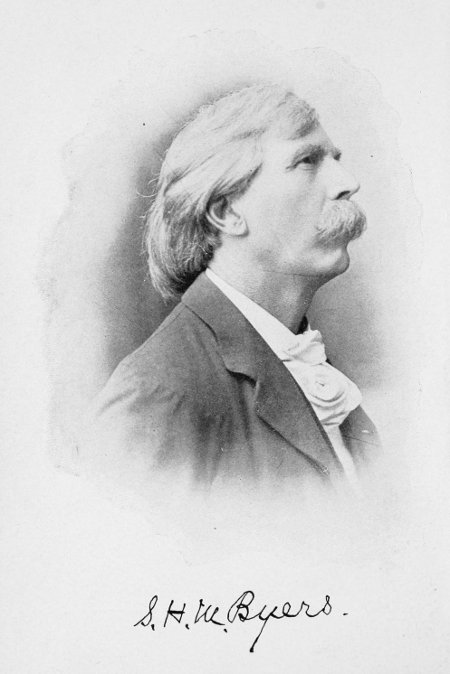
S. H. M. Byers, from his book With Fire and Sword, 1911

"The Song of Iowa" was written by Major S. H. M. Byers. Byers fought for the Union in the American Civil War but was captured by the Confederacy in 1863. Whilst in jail in Libby Prison in Richmond, Virginia, he was inspired to write "The Song of Iowa" after hearing the Confederate bands playing "Maryland, My Maryland" (also set to "O Tannenbaum") outside his prison cell. He wrote the lyrics and upon his release, asked a French opera singer at Foster Opera House in Des Moines, Iowa, to perform it for the first time. The song was well received by the audience who requested constant encores of it. In order to foster state pride, Byers ran a contest in 1902 for teachers wherein the teacher who taught "The Song of Iowa" to the most students who could recite it by heart, would receive a gold watch. As a result of the contest, approximately 250,000 students had learned the song by heart and every school in the state had been singing it. A total of 500,000 copies of the song had been sold by October 1902.

In 1911, the Iowa State Legislature officially designated "The Song of Iowa" as Iowa's state song. The song would be performed at ceremonial events in the state, usually immediately after the American national anthem "The Star-Spangled Banner".

== Modern criticism ==
In the 21st century, criticism started to grow about "The Song of Iowa" and occasional petitions to change it as Iowa's official state song were made. Most criticisms were based upon Iowa's state song sharing the same tune as Maryland's. In 2015, the Washington Post suggested Iowa change their state song.

== Lyrics ==
You asked what land I love the best,
Tis Iowa, O Iowa,
The fairest State of all the west,
It's Iowa, O! Iowa,

From yonder Mississippi's stream
To where Missouri's waters gleam
O! fair it is as poet's dream,
O! Iowa, In Iowa.

Go read the story of thy past.
O! Iowa, O! Iowa,
What glorious deeds, what fame thou hast!
O! Iowa, O! Iowa,

So long as time's great cycle runs,
Or nations weep their fallen ones
Thou'lt not forget thy patriot son',
O! Iowa, O! Iowa.
