= Taste Unlimited =

Restaurant chain in Virginia, US

Coordinates: 36°53′35″N 76°11′30″W

- Company type: Private company
- Industry: Food and beverage
- Founded: 1973; 53 years ago
- Founder: Peter Coe
- Headquarters: Virginia Beach, Virginia, United States
- Products: Sandwiches, salads, and soups
- Subsidiaries: Zinnia

Taste Unlimited, more commonly known simply as Taste, is a Hampton Roads-based restaurant chain. The chain was started in 1973, and has 9 locations across the Hampton Roads area.

== History ==
In 1973, Peter Coe opened up the Hilltop location in Virginia Beach. It was originally designed to provide specialty food, cheese, and wine to the region, but it soon included sandwiches. A second location was opened in Ghent in 1976, and the chain later expanded to other locations.

In 2006, the company was handed from the Coe family to the Pruden family. Since then, they have expanded to 9 locations throughout Hampton Roads. It is employee-owned.
