= Capture of Columbia =

1865 American Civil War battle

Coordinates: 34.0007°N 81.0348°W

- Part of the Campaign of the Carolinas
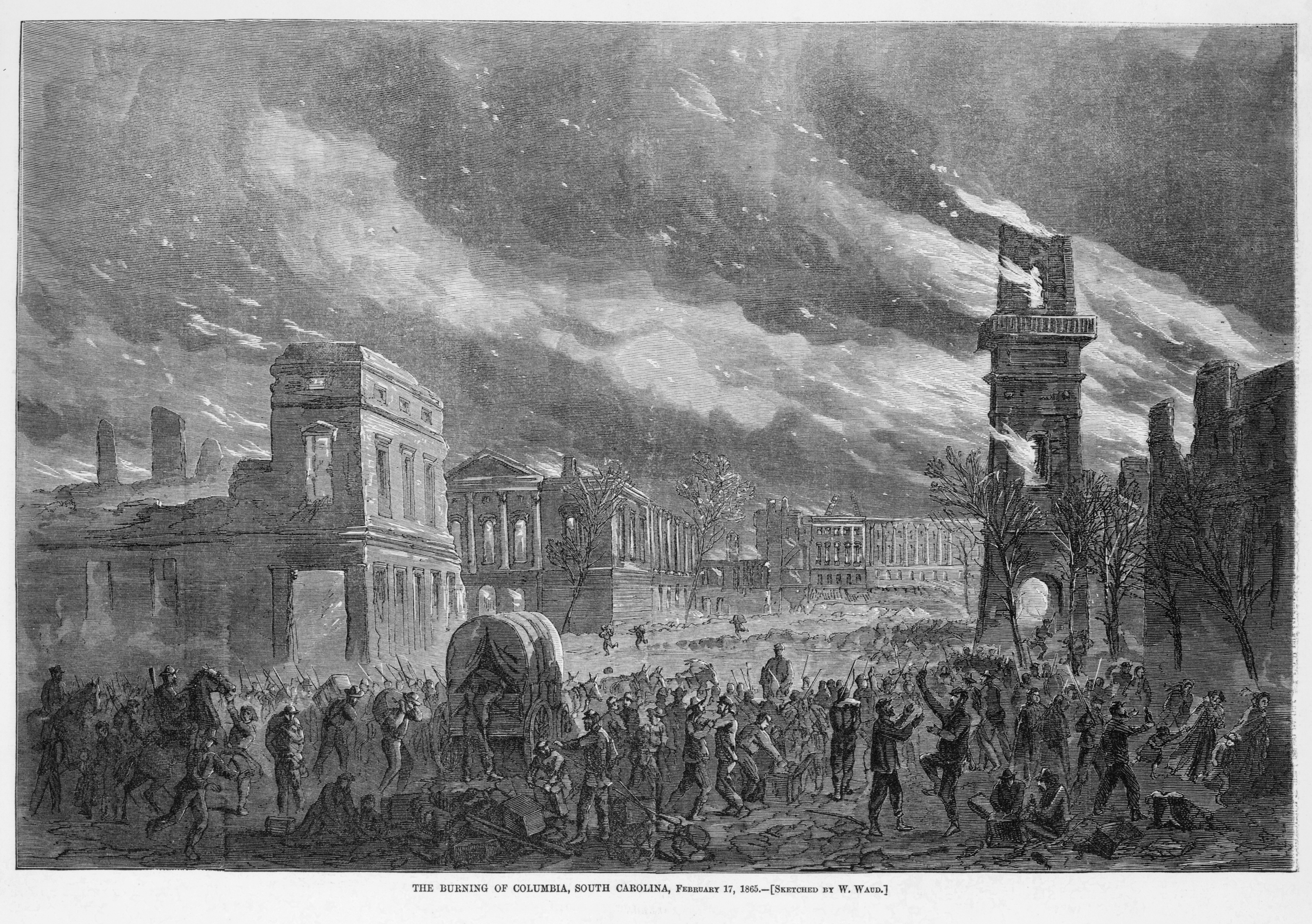
- The Burning of Columbia, South Carolina, on February 17, 1865, as depicted in Harper's Weekly
Date	February 17–18, 1865
Location	Columbia, South Carolina
Result	Union victory

Belligerents
United States	Confederate States

Commanders and leaders
(United States) William T. Sherman	(Confederate States of America) Wade Hampton

Strength
60,000	~500
- Location within South Carolina

The capture of Columbia occurred February 17–18, 1865, during the Carolinas campaign of the American Civil War. The state capital of Columbia, South Carolina, was captured by Union forces under Major General William T. Sherman. Much of the city was burned, although it is not clear which side caused the fires.

After Gen. Sherman's March to the Sea captured Savannah, Georgia, he turned his forces north and marched into the Carolinas. Splitting his forces to deceive the Confederates, Sherman maneuvered towards Columbia in early February 1865. Columbia was of considerable strategic importance: it was a center of manufacturing, a rail hub, a state capital, and a symbolic origin point of the secession movement. Poor planning and leadership on the part of the Confederates meant that Columbia was underdefended. Confederate forces, under P. G. T. Beauregard, had been spread thin rather than concentrated to take Sherman in field combat. No preparations had been made for the evacuation of the city's citizens, army materiel, or administrative functions (including the Confederate treasury's printing presses).

When it became apparent in mid February that the full might of the Union army was bearing down on Columbia, the city erupted into panic. Hasty last minute attempts were made to evacuate the city's military supplies, but almost none were salvaged. The city's considerable cotton reserves were ordered taken into the streets to be burned so that they could not fall into the hands of the enemy. Retreating and demoralized Confederate elements began to stream into the city, precipitating riots. The city fell into disorder, and martial law was declared on the 16th. Realizing the city was lost, Confederate forces withdrew from the city overnight. Fires broke out in the street cotton during the night, due either to drunk Confederates, Union shelling, or both.

The Union Army entered the city on the morning of the 17th. Union forces set about garrisoning the city with a provost guard, and extinguishing numerous fires that were already burning. Despite efforts by Union commanders, drunkenness began to spread through the army. Fires also continued to burn throughout the city; at least nine separate groups of fires were extinguished during the day. As evening approached, the situation was becoming dire. A new garrison was called into the city, but when it entered around 8 pm, they found a new fire had started. This final fire was the most destructive. Driven by high winds, it could not be extinguished even by the thousands of troops in the provost guard. Undisciplined Union soldiers complicated firefighting efforts, as rogue elements of the army were generally looting the city, and some were setting fires. Finally, winds died down around 2 am on the 18th, and the Union army was able to extinguish the fire. Further garrison elements were also called into the city, which restored order by 5 am.

A third of the city's buildings were destroyed in the various fires. The responsibility for the fires has been a topic of historical and popular debate. The idea that Gen. Sherman ordered the burning of Columbia has persisted as part of the myth of the Lost Cause of the Confederacy. But modern historians have concluded that no one cause led to the burning of Columbia, and that Sherman did not order the burning. Rather, the chaotic atmosphere in the city on the occasion of its fall led to the ideal conditions for a fire to start and spread.

== Background ==
=== Columbia in 1865 ===
Columbia was small for a capital town; only 8,052 residents, some 3,500 whom were slaves, had been counted in the 1860 census. Charleston, South Carolina, by comparison had 40,522 residents in 1860. The aging wooden statehouse of South Carolina had been recently moved and was in the process of being replaced by a granite one. But it lay unfinished, much like the Capitol dome in Washington, D.C., at the time.

The Columbia economy was based around the cotton trade, and many warehouses were dedicated to its storage. The South had overproduced cotton for years leading up to the war. Combined with the Union blockade of the South, Columbian warehouses, and even basements and outbuildings of unrelated properties, were packed full of cotton. A cotton fire in January 1864 had burned down several warehouses, destroying some $3.4 million worth of property and cotton (equivalent to $69,989,362 in 2025). Another fire followed in June 1864, burning even more cotton than the January fire had.

The city was of considerable importance to the Confederacy. Columbia was the site of the first Southern secession convention, which assembled in the First Baptist Church on December 17, 1860. Secession may well have been declared in Columbia, were it not for a smallpox outbreak which moved the convention partway through to Charleston, where South Carolina became the first state to secede from the Union on December 20. A considerable military infrastructure sprung up in Columbia. The state arsenal was located in Columbia, along with the state military academy. The grounds of the University of South Carolina were converted into a military hospital, since its role as an educational institution had been made moot after its entire student body volunteered for the Confederate Army. In 1863, the city became one of the only domestic sources of medical supplies for the Confederacy, under Dr. Joseph LeConte. The city's most important industrial contribution was the Palmetto Iron Works, which in concert with a nearby gunpowder factory, manufactured shells, bullets, and cannons. The Confederate Army sock factory was located in Columbia, which worked together with 500 local women who finished the rough socks. The Confederate treasury's printing presses were relocated to Columbia in 1862, which was an ever more important enterprise as inflation forced the printing of $1.5 billion in currency, three times as much as the Union printed. The city's strategic importance was made even more clear by being a junction of numerous railroads. By 1865, it was also the Confederacy's last breadbasket. All of these factors combined to make it the obvious next target for General William T. Sherman after his successful March to the Sea.

=== Military ===
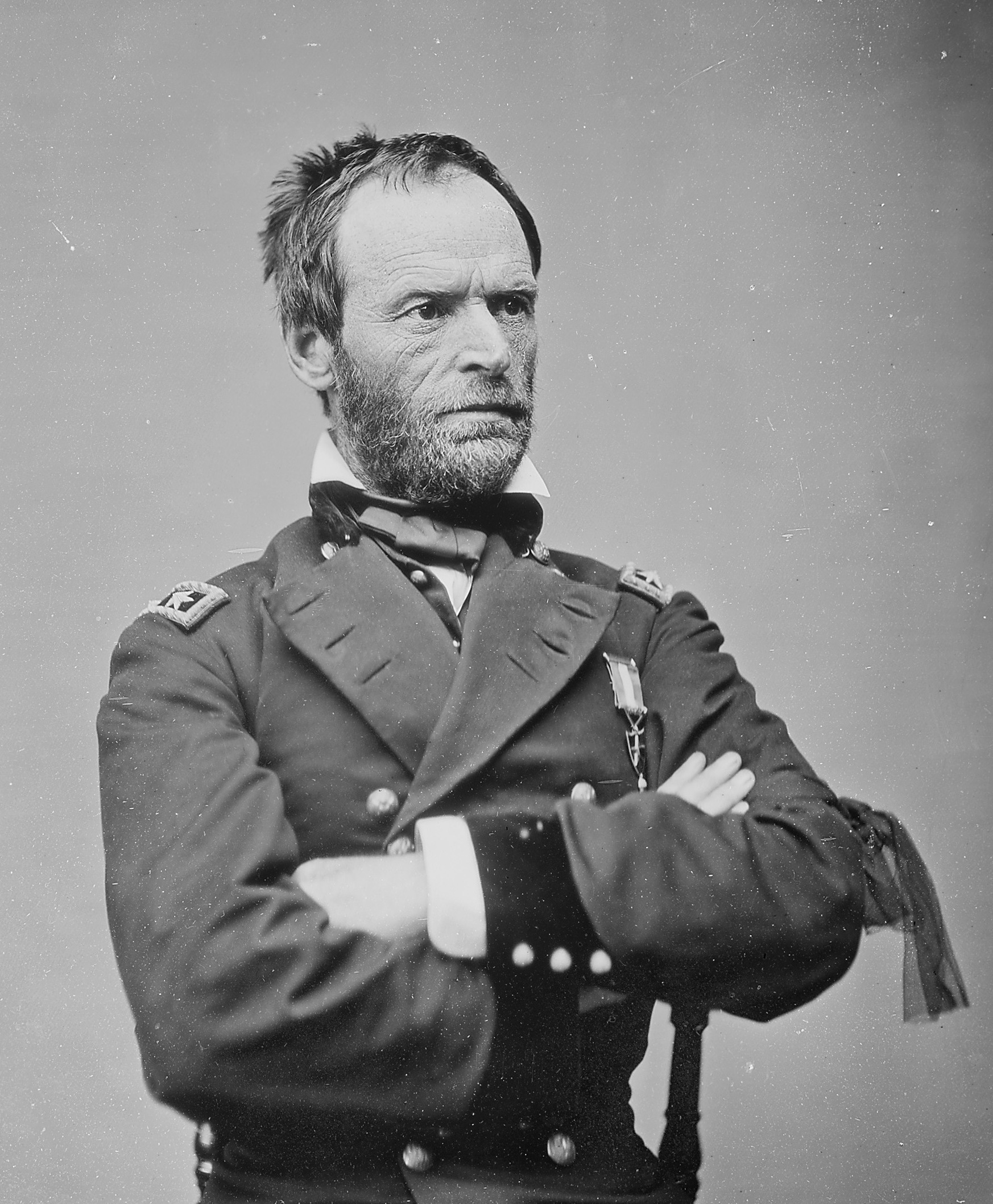
Union Gen. William Tecumseh Sherman, who led the Union campaign into the Carolinas.

Following the fall of Savannah, Georgia, at the end of his March to the Sea, Maj. Gen. William T. Sherman turned his combined armies northward to unite with Lt. Gen. Ulysses S. Grant in Virginia and to cut General Robert E. Lee's supply lines to the Deep South. He planned to march through South Carolina to Columbia, then capture and destroy the Confederate arsenal at Fayetteville, North Carolina, before uniting with the XXIII Corps, commanded by Maj. Gen. John Schofield, at Goldsboro, North Carolina. To confuse the Confederates, he sent his left wing westward towards Augusta and his right wing eastward towards Charleston.

Confederate forces in South Carolina were part of the Department of the West, under the command of General P.G.T. Beauregard. He attempted to defend both Augusta and Charleston and divided his available forces between the two cities to defend them as long as possible. He hoped that doing so would give the Confederacy an advantage during negotiations at the Hampton Roads peace conference; he also thought that he could reconcentrate his forces if Sherman changed course for Columbia.

Sherman sought to maximize his speed and deception as he entered South Carolina. He stripped the army down to its barebones, leaving behind most of its baggage, opting to go without supply lines and forage on the march. He then split his army into two prongs, making one appear to go for Charleston, and the other for Augusta, Georgia. The Confederates fell for the ruse, split their forces, and were resoundingly defeated by Sherman's extremely mobile army. Most importantly, the Confederates had left Columbia mostly unprotected since they believed that Sherman's army was not heading for it. But Columbian citizens saw the impending threat, and organized civilian petitions for defense starting in December 1864. Repeated attempts by Columbian citizens to arrange for Confederate reinforcements failed; by January 1865, the Confederate government believed that Charleston (and by extension Columbia) could not be held and was unworthy of reinforcement. A plea by Governor Andrew Gordon Magrath to General Robert E. Lee was only slightly more successful, leading Lee to dispatch a token force of 2,000 troops to bolster the 30,000 already in South Carolina. But the nature of the threat to Columbia remained mostly unconsidered as late as February 14th. Only on February 10 was the first sign of the danger apparent, when Dr. LeConte received orders to pack up the Confederate medical/chemical facilities and ship them to Richmond. But even Dr. LeConte believed the city to be safe, having heard that only 300 troops threatened the city, compared to its 5,000 defenders.

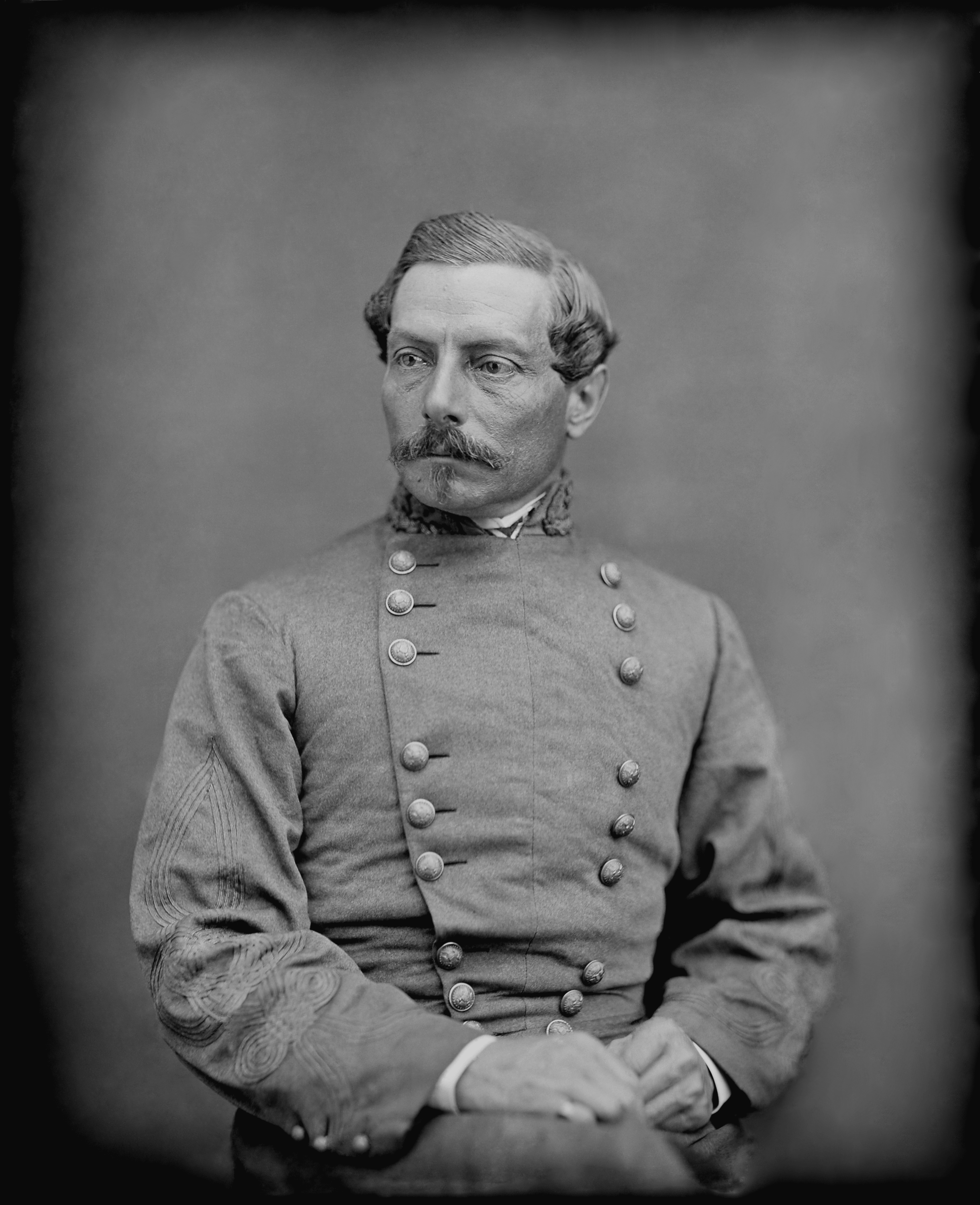
Confederate Gen. Pierre Gustave Toutant de Beauregard, who was in charge of the Carolina's defense.

The defense of Columbia was made mostly ineffectual by the poor decisions of General P. G. T. Beauregard, who further split his forces trying to counter Sherman, rather than keeping his forces together. Historian Marion Lucas assesses that Beauregard failed to learn from Sherman's March to the Sea. Had he learned, Lucas argues that Beauregard would have realized that Sherman would again split his forces, and that the best counter would have been to keep Confederate forces united and attack Sherman's weak flanks. Lucas also argues that the Confederate forces had the advantage despite being outnumbered two-to-one: they had considerable stores of food and ammunition, compared to Sherman's foraging troops. Further, Sherman was being slowed by torrential winter rains and impassable roads. But Lucas ultimately argues that Beauregard had already succumbed to defeatism, and that the spirit had infected the troops. Beauregard sent a dejected message to Lee on February 15, indicating that he would be withdrawing towards North Carolina, implicitly meaning that Columbia was to be abandoned.

== Prelude to capture ==
=== Skirmishing begins ===
On February 15, 1865, a mere 15 days after entering the Carolinas, Sherman's army had advanced to within four miles of Columbia. Skirmishes broke out repeatedly. Confederate forces shelled Union troops in their sleep on the night of February 15th, after Union forces gave away their positions by lighting campfires. Sherman was angered by the killing of his sleeping troops, and contemplated retaliation, but decided against it. The last Confederate troops pulled back across the Saluda and Congaree rivers on February 16, burning the bridges across the rivers, disobeying Beauregard's orders. Confederate sharpshooters harassed Union troops from across the Congaree; Union troops quickly shelled the sharpshooters into silence. At this point, it still appeared that the city would not be taken without a fight, and Sherman made plans for its capture. He issued Special Field Order No. 26, which was nearly identical in its terms to the order issued for the capture of Savannah a couple of months prior:

General Howard will cross the Saluda and Broad rivers as near their mouths as possible, occupy Columbia, destroy the public buildings, railroad property, manufacturing and machine shops, but will spare libraries and asylums and private dwellings.

=== Evacuation of Columbia ===
Little consideration had been made by Confederate authorities for a potential evacuation. Thus, by February 14th, when it was finally apparent that the full might of the Union Army was bearing down on Columbia, the city descended into panic. Citizens and government officials competed for space on outgoing railroad trains, with no system for priority. The town fell into a further state of chaos as retreating Confederate troops streamed into the city. Martial law was declared on the 16th as rioting began to take hold. The Confederates did have some successes in evacuation. They managed to get out the treasury presses, and the treasury employees with all their baggage (save for the women's hoop skirts) aboard a train. Further, the Union prisoners of war had been successfully evacuated on February 12, in perhaps the only act of preplanning in the evacuation, though planning for proper provisions had not been arranged. Otherwise, the evacuation of Confederate property was a disaster. The commander of the Palmetto Armory desperately sought permission to prioritize the Armory's irreplaceable stock machines, but became bogged down in Confederate inefficiency and communication issues; the machines just barely escaped Columbia. The rest of the Armory was not so lucky, it was rendered de facto captured on the 16th as Union artillery came within range.

Confederate Major N. R. Chambliss arrived in the city on February 14 with the intent of evacuating the considerable military stores. Though initially he tarried in evacuating supplies, Chambliss proved to be the most dedicated and capable Confederate official regarding evacuation. He found the rail lines packed on the 14th, and opted to take no action that day. But on the 15th he realized that there was no effort being undertaken whatsoever to remove government property. He sought out Major John T. Trezevant, and came up with a plan to procure wagons to be loaded after dark. But Chambliss did not put all his faith in Trezevant, and continued his own efforts throughout the day to requisition evacuation. Around midnight, Trezevant had still not appeared, and Chambliss went to the armory; Trezevant was nowhere to be found. Chambliss managed to requisition one railcar, which he found packed with treasury employees. He ordered them out by force, and with the help of the arsenal's mechanics, loaded the single car with a mere 105,000 rounds of ammunition, and some official documents. To have removed all of the stores in the arsenal, it was estimated that at least 20 cars would have been needed. Further, 70 cars worth of supplies had been sent from Charleston, which were not evacuated from Columbia. The loss of 90 train cars worth of military supplies was perhaps the greatest of the whole war.

==== Cotton burning orders ====
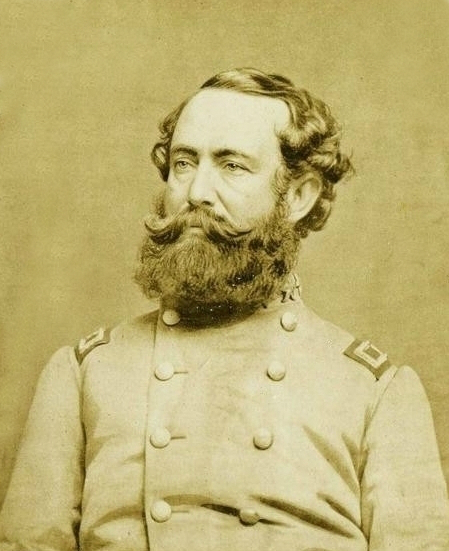
Lt. Gen. Wade Hampton, who oversaw the final day of Confederate control of Columbia.

Most consequentially, the slipshod planning prevented the planned destruction of the city's cotton stores. Confederate policy was to burn valuable cotton rather than let it fall into Union hands. But the utter lack of transportation meant that the cotton could not be taken outside the city, to be safely burned as planned. The post commander, Major Green, came up with the idea to pull the cotton into the streets to be burned; his orders were published in the Columbia newspapers on the 15th. By the 16th, most of the city's cotton had been pulled out of the warehouses, basements, and sheds it was stockpiled in. A change in command followed. Wade Hampton III was promoted to Lt. Gen., effective the morning of the 17th. His first order was to forbid the burning of the cotton, since he realized that burning the cotton in situ would represent an extreme fire hazard. But Hampton's orders likely did not make it to most Confederate soldiers on the ground, since Major Green had deserted his post by the time Hampton took command of the area.

=== Sherman advances ===
Sherman's forces, which had been split into two prongs, reunited on the west bank of the Congaree river on February 16. Sherman directed Maj. Gen. Oliver Otis Howard to take the city proper with the army's right wing, while Maj. Gen. Henry Warner Slocum was given the task of taking the army's left wing to capture Winnsboro, South Carolina, 13 miles upstream the Saluda river. Heavy rains complicated Howard's task: the rivers were swollen and the Confederates had burned all the bridges. Crossing the Saluda river would be necessary, and engineers set about building a pontoon bridge. Confederate sharpshooters delayed completion, but Union troops dislodged the shooters, and the bridge was finished before day's end. The next river to cross was the Broad river, which still had a bridge across it being held by Confederates. The bridge was nearly taken whole after a short fight, but the Confederates had already rigged it to burn, and set it alight as they retreated. Once again the Union army found itself at a river with no bridges. Again, the troops set about engineering a crossing with gusto, working through the night. Around 3 in the morning, engineers successfully shot a pontoon line across the river and the army ferried two boats of sharpshooters to the far side to establish a beachhead. But a suitable pontoon bridge to allow the bulk of the army to cross would not be finished until around 9 in the morning on the 17th.

=== Drunkenness and the first fires ===
The city had a considerable store of alcohol; much of the alcohol of Charleston had been shipped to Columbia for safekeeping and local merchants had on hand large quantities. The medical factory also had considerable stores of whiskey. The mayor of Columbia, Thomas Jefferson Goodwyn, beseeched the Confederate generals Beauregard and Hampton to destroy the liquor, but the generals were of the opinion they had no such authority. A period of considerable drunkenness broke out on the night of the 16th. The withdrawing Confederate army lost all discipline, and combined with rampaging civilians to terrorize the town. Numerous fires were set in the night, likely by a combination of drunks and continuing Union bombardment. A large explosion of gunpowder set off by a plunderer destroyed the South Carolina Railroad depot around 6 a.m. on the 17th. Numerous cotton fires were burning by the morning of the 17th.

=== Surrender ===
The only Confederates defending the city by this point were small detachments from Maj. Gen. Joseph Wheeler's cavalry corps, Maj. Gen. Matthew Butler's cavalry division, and Lt. Gen. Stephen D. Lee's corps from the Army of Tennessee. General Beauregard had expressed to the mayor of Columbia that he hoped to have all Confederate troops out of the city before daybreak on the 17th; this had not been achieved. But the explosion of the SCRR depot (whose cause was then unknown) sent the mayor into a panic. He attempted to surrender soon after, but was stopped by Lt. Gen. Hampton. Hampton then rode out to assess the battlefield, and found that Union forces had already crossed the Congaree river, putting his forces in an untenable position. He commanded the remaining troops to withdraw from Columbia, and ordered Maj. Gen. Matthew Butler to burn the Charlotte and South Carolina Rail Road terminal. The mayor and the city's aldermen, now without Hampton to stop them, rode out to surrender around 9 am. The last of the Confederate troops, some 5,000 strong, pulled out sometime between 10 and 11 in the morning. The last act of the fleeing Confederates was to set ablaze the Charlotte and South Carolina Rail Road.

== The capture ==
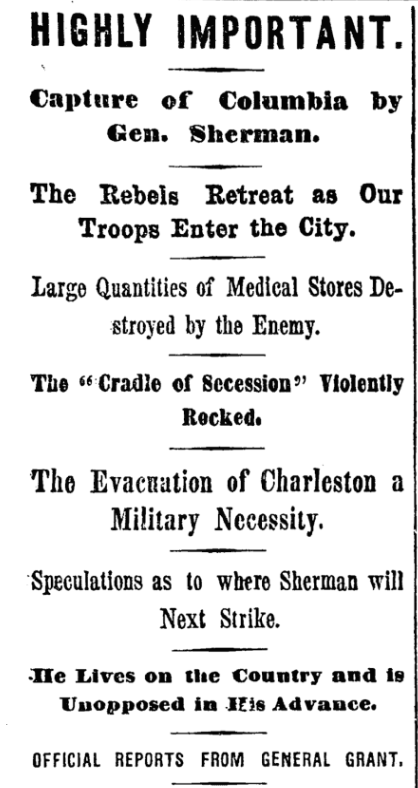
News of the Capture reached the North a few days later. From the front page of the New York Times, February 20th, 1865.

Colonel George A. Stone, commander of the third brigade, XV Corps, crossed the Broad river at 9 am on the morning of the 17th. He sent out his skirmishers to attack the fleeing Confederates. Around 10 am, he met the Mayor and Aldermen of Columbia, who carried a flag of surrender. The Mayor asked Colonel Stone for his terms, Stone replied that he could only accept an unconditional surrender. The Mayor and the Aldermen had a short discussion, and unconditionally surrendered Columbia.

But the fleeing Confederate forces had no idea of the surrender, and continued to fight Stone's skirmishers. Stone was outraged at the violation of the surrender, and at the Mayor and the Aldermen, and put them under armed guard, ordering them to be shot if a single Union soldier was hurt by the Confederates. Luckily for the Mayor and Aldermen, the Union quickly repulsed the Confederates without injury.

The first Union soldiers into Columbia used a flatboat to cross the Congaree. Once a force of 75 had been crossed, they made for the state house, briefly exchanging fire with retreating elements of Wheeler's cavalry. They reached the state house at about 10:30, and planted an American flag. Stone's troops, coming from the other direction, were not far behind in reaching the city.

At this point, the citizens of Columbia began offering alcoholic beverages they had stolen to the Union troops in an ill-thought out attempt to placate their conquerors. Stone meanwhile quickly rode through the city to assess the situation. He found numerous cotton bales on fire around 11 am, and ordered troops to lay down their arms and work on fighting fires. When he returned to the bulk of his troops he found that some were already drunk. He surmised that his troops, who had been awake for days and hadn't eaten in 24 hours, had been immediately intoxicated by the well meaning citizens. He ordered the alcohol destroyed. But subsequent events illustrated that much of it escaped destruction and instead found its way into more Union soldiers.

News of the surrender reached Sherman around this time. He crossed into Columbia across a pontoon bridge along with Maj. Gen. Howard. They rode through the cotton district, and noted the presence of cotton everywhere. Many bales had been cut open, and loose cotton was blowing around; a heavy wind had been blowing all morning. Sherman remarked to Howard that it was like a northern snowstorm, but of cotton. Accounts of local residents agree with that of Sherman and Howard: wind had driven cotton everywhere. Sherman entered the town square at noon, where he found Col. Stone's troops using local fire engines to try to put out fires. Sherman then had a short conversation with the mayor, where he promised to protect private property.

During the stop in the town square, S. H. M. Byers, a recently freed prisoner of war, approached Sherman and handed him a scrap of paper. On it was written a poem entitled "Sherman's March to the Sea", which Byers had written while imprisoned. Sherman, reading the paper later in the day, was moved by Byers' poem, and promoted Byers to his staff. The poem would go on to lend its name to Sherman's campaign, and a version set to music became an instant hit with Sherman's Army and later the public, though Sherman himself hated the song.

=== Garrisoning the city ===
By nightfall, almost the entire right wing of the Union army had entered Columbia and setup headquarters at various points in town. The only elements not in town were the XVII Corps under Maj. Gen. Frank P. Blair Jr., and the Third Division under Bvt. Maj. Gen. Manning F. Force, which were encamped four miles to the northeast (as well as the Army's left wing, which was marching to Winnsboro). It was customary that the first brigade of Sherman's Army into a town would set up a Provost Guard. The task thus fell to the Third Brigade, First Division, XV Corps. About 4,500 men were set to guarding the town. Maj. Gen. Howard assumed command of the Provost Guard when he entered the city, which was an unusual move, but one ordered by Sherman seemingly with an eye towards discipline.

The Army's high command had some inkling that discipline would be an issue in Columbia. Gossip in the camp along the way to South Carolina had shown that the soldiers held a special enmity for the state, and many talked of a coming judgement day for the state that had first declared secession. Other soldiers talked about putting it to the "fire and sword". Sherman was aware of the sentiment, though as historian Lucas explains, Sherman had dismissed the threats as mere rhetoric. Lucas adds that it was not that Sherman did not care about the protection of Columbia, it was that he was more focused on victory or defeat in the campaign.

Maj. Gen. Howard had first evaluated security at midday when he rode into town with Sherman. He found conditions satisfactory at the time, noting that the Third Brigade's Provost Guard had already set troops to guard key buildings and road junctions, and was assisting in firefighting efforts. But when he returned at 1:30 with Sherman and discovered intoxication spreading through the ranks, he ordered the Provost Guard to put drunken soldiers under temporary arrest. Howard seems to have been disturbed by the soldier's drinking, and spent a portion of the afternoon ensuring drunken soldiers were being appropriately found and dealt with by the Provost Guard.

Regardless of various efforts to tamp down on drunkenness, the number of drunk Union troops was increasing. Despite an order to destroy all liquor in the city, citizens and soldiers alike were understandably hesitant to destroy the valuable commodity. Brig. Gen. John E. Smith, 3rd Brigade, XV Corps, noting the free availability of alcohol, instead ordered his troops confined to camp rather than let them fraternize in the city. Other officers attempted to follow suit, but most were not as successful as Smith. Aside from procuring alcohol from the city, soldiers were also requisitioning foodstuffs from the locals, taking grain, livestock, and other supplies. Despite the looting, historian Lucas assesses the situation in the afternoon as fairly calm and typical. Even in the accounts of the Confederate locals, they acknowledge that the Union troops were at this point generally well behaved.

Sherman returned to his headquarters and took a short rest before the Mayor approached him in the late afternoon. The Mayor informed him that a local lady, whom Sherman had known in his youth, wished to speak with Sherman. Sherman and the Mayor went to her residence and visited a bit. On the way back from her residence, Sherman sought to assuage the visibly anxious Mayor that the town would be kept safe. Sherman noted that some of the town would have to be destroyed as a matter of war, but that any destruction would be limited to machine shops, arsenals, foundries, and other industry involved in the war. At any rate, Sherman noted any such burning would not take place until at least the next day, and not before the winds died down. Sherman parted ways with the Mayor around 6 pm.

Gen. Howard's late afternoon was focused on ensuring discipline. He ordered Col. Stone's troops rotated out of the Provost Guard, an action that historian Lucas considers drastic, and notes this was unprecedented in the Georgia and South Carolina campaigns. Despite this proactive effort, Lucas faults Gen. Howard for not acting earlier. At any rate, Howard's orders were very specific, and were passed down the chain of command to Bvt. Maj. Gen. Charles R. Woods, who became the new Provost Marshall. In turn, the orders to garrison the city were passed to his brother, Bvt. Brig. Gen. William B. Woods, commander of the First Brigade, First Division, XV Corps, which historians consider a sound decision. By the time William B. Wood received the order, his 4,500 men broke camp, and marched into the city to relieve Stone's men, some two hours had passed.

== Nightfall and the inferno ==
As William B. Wood's First Brigade entered Columbia at 8 pm, they found the Richardson street business district ablaze. Seeing the scale of the fire, William B. Woods ordered his men to fight the fire. But in attempting to fight the fire, the garrison was no longer carrying out the mission it had been sent into the city for: clearing the streets of drunk soldiers. Six hours would pass before more troops would be ordered into the city to restore order.

By 8:30 pm, the flames were visible across the city, and the various generals began converging on the center of the city. Charles R. Woods, in his role as Provost Marshall, rode from his headquarters, arriving around 8:30. He focused on coordinating firefighting efforts. Maj. Gen. John A. Logan, commander of the XV corps, and his staff arrived soon after. Gen. Howard, whose day spent garrisoning the city had been exhausting, had gone to bed, but was awakened by an aide and rushed into town, arriving next after Logan.

Sherman, whose attempt at rest earlier in the day had been foiled by the Mayor, had also gone to bed. But he was awoken by the light of the fire, and sent a staff officer to investigate. The officer returned and informed Sherman that Charles R. Woods was on scene with sufficient men, but was fighting high winds. Sherman was initially satisfied, but as the conflagration grew, he became concerned. He sent further messengers to each of his generals. Reports from Howard, Logan, and Charles R. Woods confirmed they were fighting the fire, but that the extreme winds made the situation untenable. At this point, Logan and Howard met and agreed that there was no saving the already burning buildings. Instead, the only hope at stopping the fire would be to tear down buildings to create a fire break. Logan set about directing men along Richardson street. Charles R. Woods focused on demolition; he estimated he had some 2,000 soldiers on hand at this time. The majority of soldiers were put on demolition duty. The remainder were variously employed as spotters (and spark stoppers) atop buildings, in bucketing water, and in manning the limited number of fire engines. Despite every effort, the fire continued unabated, prompting Sherman to ride in to assume command at 11 pm. Sherman stayed until 3 am, when the fires finally began to die down.

The chief obstacle in fighting the fire were the intense winds. Union and Confederate accounts both overwhelmingly described the shower of sparks the wind drove. Winds picked up sparks and burning shingles, and blew them across the city in torrents of flame. Columbia firefighter McKenzie, a veteran of 30 years firefighting service, remarked that "There is no doubt but that the city was burned by the wind spreading the flames". Sherman recalled that while the winds continued, stopping the fire was "beyond human possibility." Only when the winds died down between 2 and 3 am on the morning of the 18th did firefighting efforts finally work.

=== Rioting ===
As the fire grew out of control, it became visible to the men of XV and XVII Corps camped outside the city. Soldiers began to stream into the city to watch the fires. They joined a growing number of citizens and refugees who were also watching the blazes. The crowds found considerable new sources of alcohol, and drunkenness began to spread even faster. Soon, uncontrolled rioting broke out. Union soldiers made up the bulk of rioters, but were supplanted by local criminals and escaped prisoners of war. The night of rioting was a struggle for order between disciplined Union troops and undisciplined or drunken Union troops. Union soldiers broke into local houses on several occasions, stole valuables, and set fires once they were done.

Accounts alternate between the horror and heroism of the night. Local resident Dr. Robert W. Gibbes gives an account of drunken soldiers entering his home around midnight, setting a fire, and preventing Dr. Gibbes from extinguishing it. But some rioters were stopped. Capt. Byers and Lt. Devine, Union prisoners of war who had been sheltering with a northern family, described how a group of drunk Union soldiers stole the belongings of their host family. But Byers and Devine secured the arrest of the drunken soldiers. A local minister (and a strong Confederate supporter), Anthony Toomer Porter, described how Lt. John A. McQueen, one of Gen. Howard's staff officers, saved his family and his house from fire, and posted a guard at the house to ensure its safety after looting Union soldiers broke in. Gen. Howard wrote that "drunken soldiers ran through house after house and were doubtless guilty of all manner of villainies." A number of citizens were beaten or attacked by Union troops, including Reverend Porter, as well as the local Catholic priest.

Historian Lucas notes that the level of arson by Union troops is "one of the most disputed issues in the events surrounding the burning of Columbia." He cites the lack of reliable eyewitnesses as a key problem. Several Confederate accounts describe rioters (not necessarily soldiers) intentionally burning buildings, including the Reverend Porter who in 1882 wrote that he had seen men enter houses, using cotton balls dipped in turpentine to set fires. At least a dozen other accounts describe Union soldiers setting fire to at one or more buildings. No Union general admitted to seeing burning, though most thought arson by soldier was possible. Contrary to the other accounts, the chief fireman of Columbia, along with three other accounts, testified that they saw no soldier commit arson. Historian Lucas concludes that there were certainly arsonist rioters, but that their influence has been overstated. Lucas notes "it would be difficult to exaggerate the horrors of that night to those whose houses were entered by drunken mobs . . . But to exaggerate the number of Columbians who experienced such visits would also be an injustice."

The extent of the rioting was limited by the general effectiveness of the Provost Guard, which was protecting many individual houses at the requests of their residents. Citizens reported that the guarding soldiers generally acted with honor and bravery, preventing many cases of looting and arson. Not all soldiers on guard were faithful however; a portion defected their posts or engaged in rioting as well.

The items looted from Columbia included just about every possible item that soldiers could carry away. Noted one Union lieutenant, "had not pianos been quite so heavy you might have seen many of them here [in the Union camp]." Many such items became souvenirs after the war, including a copy of the Atlas of South Carolina which found its way into the national archives. Some looted items were returned however, such as a collection plate from a local church which Gen. Logan demanded be given back after discovering it in camp.

Sometime after 1 am on the 18th, Gen. Logan and Gen. Howard met and decided that more effort was needed to fight the rioting. Gen. Logan issued an order around 1:30 am, calling in Brig. Gen. John M. Oliver's troops (third brigade, fourth division, XV corps) to clear the streets. Only orderly citizens, firefighting soldiers, and soldiers on guard were allowed to remain. His troops entered the city around 2 am; in two hours they had arrested 370 rioters (including soldiers, officers, and civilians), injured 30, and killed two. Order was fully restored by 5 am.

=== Extent ===
When the final fire was extinguished, by 3 am on the 18th, the city's business district lay in smoldering ruins. 458 structures burned in the combined fires, representing about a third of the city. 265 residences were burned, along with 193 businesses or public buildings, which included two fire stations, a school room, eleven churches, and seven public buildings. While more homes were burned than businesses, the amount of homes burned represented a small portion of the city, while nearly every business in town was destroyed.

The headquarters of Bvt. Maj. Gen. William F. Barry burned down as the inferno spread; the General and his staff barely escaped with their lives. The University of South Carolina narrowly escaped burning through the effort of alert citizens who put out spot fires.

== Aftermath ==
As the 18th dawned, Union commanders ascertained the extent of the damage. The fires had been limited mostly the business district, and few homes were burned. Those who had been made homeless were housed by the end of the day, given the ample supply of housing available after much of the town's citizens had fled as the Union Army approached. Howard also set about provisioning not only the army, but the citizens. The army was to requisition the food it needed, and then any excess requisitions were to be spread among the citizens who had lost their homes. Among the provisions for the citizens was a large quantity of salt, and 500 head of cattle, which were herded into the green of the college. Mayor Goodwyn, on Howard's advice, suggested that destitute residents flee to the countryside for sustenance as soon as possible, as it would be some time before the town could be rebuilt.

In the morning, it also became apparent that Union troops had been responsible for a portion of the night's chaos. Not only that, but Gen. Howard was receiving reports that Union troops were still making threats to the locals. Gen. Howard responded by further increasing security, and the size of the garrison. The nature of the garrison also changed. Columbia was divided in half, with the northern part of the town put under command of Gen. Frank P. Blair, and the southern half under William B. Woods—though the actual logistics would be delegated to a provost marshal appointed by each general. Woods ordered a strict 5 pm curfew; Blair's actions are unrecorded, though probably similar to Woods. At any rate, the improved garrison ensured security, and peace was had. Looking towards the long-term security of Columbia, given that the army would be leaving soon and could not spare men to garrison the city, Howard also provided 100 rifles to the Mayor on the condition that they would not be used against the Union.

The 18th and 19th, aside from carrying out the above mentioned tasks, were focused on destroying anything of military value in Columbia. The destruction included the railroads and their engines, amounting to 55 miles destroyed or damaged; the treasury printing factory; the powder mill; the Confederate armory and arsenal; the gasworks; the foundry; the medical laboratory; and all cotton which had not burned during the inferno. They were all burned or otherwise mechanically destroyed without incident. Also destroyed was most of the captured Confederate ammunition. Some was taken to resupply the Union Army, but most was thrown into the Congaree river. The total amount of captured ammunition was immense, amounting to 9,069 artillery shells, 26,150 pounds of gunpowder, and 1.3 million rounds of small-arms ammunition. The destruction of the ammo was not without incident: 16 men were killed when a wagon carrying shells exploded. A wide range of other infantry equipment, in similarly large quantities, was also destroyed.

With the materiel of Columbia destroyed, the Union Army left the city on February 20.

=== Importance ===
The capture of Columbia was a considerable loss for the Confederacy. The dispossession of the rail lines spelled considerable logistical trouble, especially for Gen. Robert E. Lee's army in Virginia. The city's capture was also a deep blow to Confederate morale.

=== Finger-pointing ===
The question of who was to blame for the fire became an issue almost immediately. On the 28th, Confederate Gen. Hampton accused Sherman of burning the city, or at least allowing it to be burned. Sherman shot back on April 4, in his official report on the Carolinas Campaign, accusing Hampton of the city's destruction—through his negligence of allowing so much cotton to be placed in the streets. An 1865 book by Columbia resident William Gilmore Simms blamed Sherman for the fire. A commission of Columbia citizens was assembled in 1867, based on the testimony of locals it noted that though Sherman had perhaps not ordered the burning, "the soldiers of General Sherman certainly believed that [Columbia's] destruction would not be displeasing to him", and generally concluded that Union soldiers had set fires and worsened the situation.

Two further official efforts were made to ascertain the cause of the fires. The 1871 Treaty of Washington (settling property rights and liability questions between the United States and Britain over the latter's involvement or losses in the war) led to the investigation of the burning, since British citizens had lost property in Columbia. The investigating committee determined that neither the Confederacy nor the Union was to blame for the fires. South Carolina senator Coleman L. Blease investigated the burning again in 1929, but found no new evidence; his report on the matter died in the Senate Committee on Claims.

== Burning ==
=== Responsibility for the fires ===
The idea that General Sherman ordered the burning of Columbia has persisted as part of the Lost Cause of the Confederacy narrative. But modern historians have concluded that no one cause led to the burning of Columbia, and that Sherman did not order the burning. Rather, the chaotic atmosphere in the city on the occasion of its fall led to the ideal conditions for a fire to start and spread. As a newspaper columnist noted in 1874, "the war burned Columbia."

James W. Loewen researched the topic for his book, Lies Across America, and found that most likely, the cotton bale fires spread and caused most of the destruction. He did find that there were some fires started by Union soldiers, but the effects of these were minimal. Most likely, the Confederates' scorched earth policy was to blame for the burning of Columbia.

Sherman wrote that the Union Army had a stark choice: they either could have either fought the fire, or stopped the riots. Historian Lucas agrees with this assessment, to a point. Lucas agrees that fighting the fire was the right choice, but argues that action to stop rioting could have occurred earlier. Lucas assesses that the Union officers only "belatedly realized" that they had lost control, and that this failure to timely realize the scale of the rioting only escalated the situation. Regardless, Lucas notes that the fire could not have been stopped until the winds died down, a factor beyond anyone's control.

Lucas faults Confederate Gen. Hampton for failing to declare Columbia an open city despite knowing it would be abandoned. Making Columbia an open city would have required the Confederates to not contest its capture, but in turn would have prevented the Union from bombarding the city. But since Hampton failed to do so, Sherman had a right to bombard the city.

Historian Lucas notes that the true destructiveness of the Union army was much exaggerated: victorious Union generals had reason to greatly hyperbolize their success, and bitter Confederates had reason to magnify the apparent evils of those who had defeated them. Lucas summarizes the Confederate perspective: "Fed by years of propaganda and a firm belief in the superiority of Southern civilization—and convinced that only a supermonstrous army could defeat their gallant sons and husbands—Southerners also tended to exaggerate the destructiveness of the Union forces."

Sherman did not order the city burned. But pro-Confederate writers suggested that Sherman's prior statements showed his true intent. Historian Lucas analyzes that none of these statements actually show that Sherman intended to burn any city, let alone Columbia. Lucas concludes that Sherman's statements on point were calculated to weaken Confederate morale, rather than an expression of policy. Both Lucas and Barrett note that Sherman was frequently loose with his words, expressing positions he did not hold and ideas he did not believe in. Further, Sherman's statements show that his focus was overwhelmingly on railroads, as transport was the life blood of the Confederacy. Lucas goes on to debunk several other claims, including that the XV corps had a reputation for brutality and were purposefully unleashed on the city, or that a conspiracy existed to burn the city upon the shooting of signal rockets.

Lucas's final assessment is that "the event was surrounded by coincidence, misjudgment, and accident. It was the fault of no one person or single group of persons, though there were those who were not blameless in the series of events that transpired." Lucas chastises the Confederate leadership for leading to the chaotic conditions in the city, utterly failing to plan for the city's fall, and for the orders to burn the city's cotton. Further, he finds fault with Gen. Beauregard and Gen. Hampton for their defeatism and delay, respectively, as well as for failing to order the city's alcohol pre-emptively destroyed. Lucas finds general fault on the point of alcohol: Confederate generals did not order it destroyed, the citizens foolishly gave it out in great quantities to the Union Army, and the Union command failed to prevent drunkenness from spreading through the ranks; though the Union did at least attempt to destroy it, they were in a poor position to do so. Lucas also chastises the Union leadership. He finds that Gen. Howard's delay in reinforcing the garrison until the afternoon, coupled by the redirection of those forces to firefighting, contributed to the unrest. Lucas ascribes blame to Union leadership as a whole for the delay of expanding the garrison until well after midnight. Lucas concludes that each side lost control of the situation at different points. He concludes that Sherman did not order the city burned. Despite failings on each side, he concludes that the true reason for the fires' destructiveness were the extreme winds, which were beyond the control of anyone. Lucas concludes the likeliest cause of the fires: given that "Columbia [was] a virtual firetrap", the burning was "an accident of war". He finds that the Union troops acted better than lionized accounts later claimed, finding that Union troops generally protected the city, that no Columbians were killed during the night, and that the only dead were two Union soldiers killed by the Provost Guard as it swept the streets. He finds that less of the city was destroyed than claimed by contemporary accounts, and that the Union made considerable efforts to fight the fires and help residents in its aftermath. Lucas acknowledges that the burning stuck firmly in the collective consciousness of the city. He concludes that the psychological effect of being abandoned by the Confederate Army, and so easily captured by the Union Army, combined with the trauma of the city's burning, humiliated the proud people of Columbia, ensuring they would never forget.

=== List of fires ===
Numerous individual fires broke out in the city. In order, they were:

- The bridge over the Congaree river, burned on the morning of February 16th by retreating Confederates, against orders.
- Fires burning in cotton bales by 3 am on the morning of the 17th, as reported by Confederate Maj. Chambliss. Cause either drunk Confederates, Union bombardment, or a combination of both.
- The explosion of the South Carolina Railroad Station, at 6 am on the 17th, likely caused by looters.
- 100 to 150 bales of cotton on Richard street, which was burning when the Union Army entered the city.
- The Charlotte Railroad station, burned on Gen. Hampton's orders between 10 and 11 am; it was still on fire when the Union army entered the city.
- The city jail, around 1 pm on the 17th. The cause is unknown, and it was quickly extinguished by a fire engine and Union soldiers.
- Cotton bales on the corner of Plain and Richardson streets, set ablaze in the afternoon. Cause unknown.
- The homes of various well known citizens, and some top Confederate officials, several miles east of town, were burned in the afternoon. Among them were those of Gen. Hampton and the Confederate Treasurer George Trenholm. Union soldiers or escaped prisoners, directed by townsfolk, were the most likely cause.
- Cotton bales at Sumter street between Washington street and Lady street, set just before 5 pm. Cause unknown.
- Brothels on Gervais street, which caught fire around nightfall. Cause unknown. Despite the best efforts at firefighting, the row of houses were destroyed due to their wooden construction.
- The final and most destructive fire broke around 8 pm. It burned until 2 or 3 am the next morning, and became an inferno due to the closely spaced wooden buildings, blowing cotton, and a strong wind.

== Legacy ==
Historian Lucas notes that Sherman's use of psychological warfare had long lasting effects: "the trauma of the invasion and burning of Columbia lived on in the minds of South Carolinians in the form of an undying hatred for Sherman and a worship of the 'lost cause'".

According to contemporary accounts, "as much as two-thirds of Columbia was destroyed, though later studies arrived at a lower figure. While the exact extent of the damage may never be known, without question the fires razed political, military, and transportation targets while indiscriminately destroying commercial, educational, religious and private properties in the process. The legacy of this physical loss became a pillar of the city’s common folklore and memories of the war, and it remains hotly debated today."

The New York Times noted in 2015 that the narrative that Sherman burned down the city has remained popular in neo-Confederate circles. The Times investigated neo-Confederate claims that the burning was a war crime, but concluded that the burning was "an accident of war."
