= Tupelo Honey Cafe =

American restaurant chain

Coordinates: 35.5947°N 82.5548°W

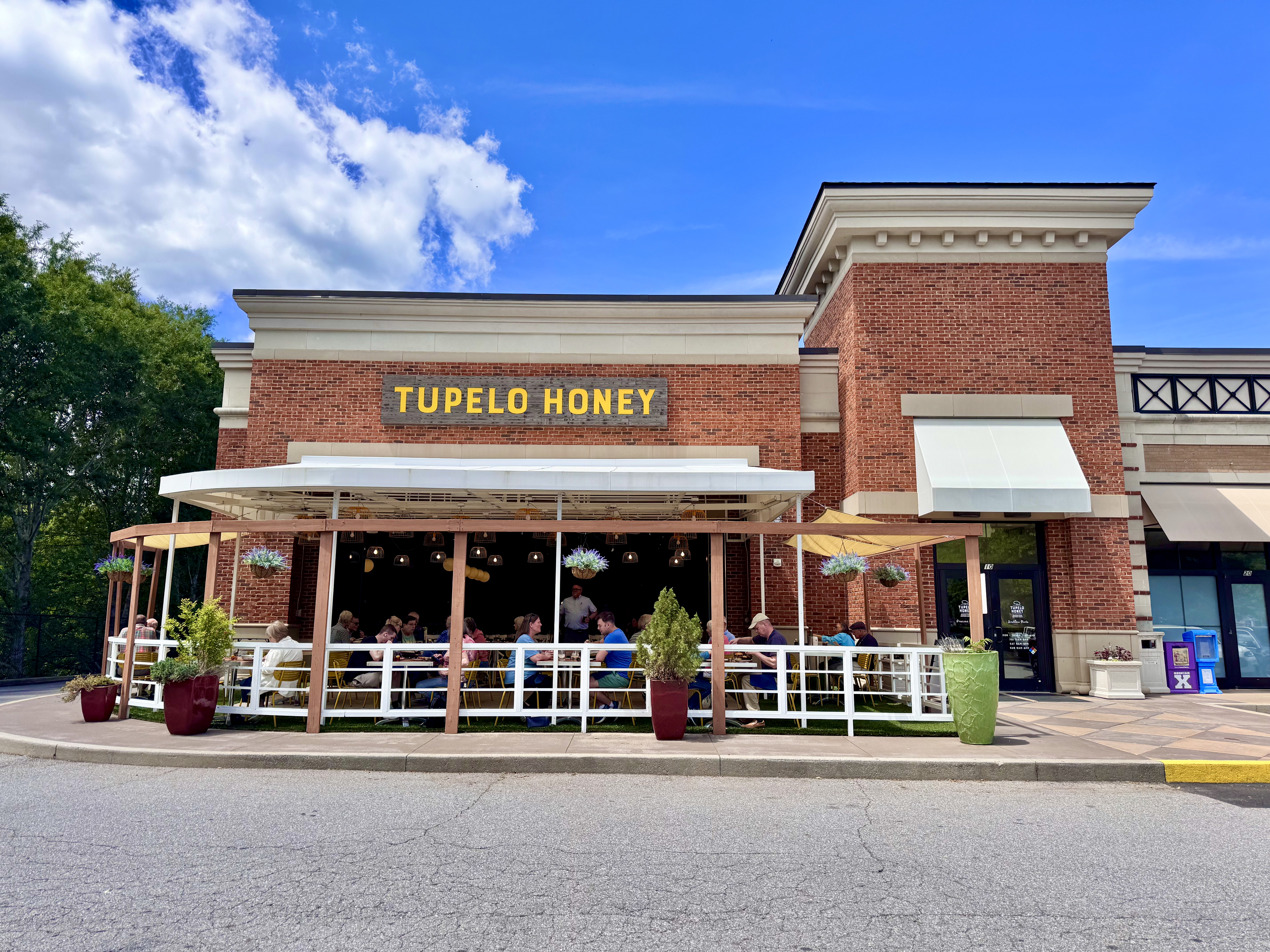
Tupelo Honey Cafe in South Asheville

Tupelo Honey Cafe is a restaurant chain based in downtown Asheville, North Carolina, specializing in Southern cooking.

The restaurant was established in 2000 by Sharon Schott. The company has since expanded to 26 locations across 17 states.

== History ==
Original owner Sharon Schott, after traveling around the US, recognized the need for a restaurant that could offer locals and tourists a taste of the south but with healthy ingredients. On December 7, 2000 Tupelo Honey Cafe opened their downtown Asheville North Carolina location. In 2008 the cafe was purchased by Stephen Frabitore, seeing it as the ideal business to run during his retirement although he had never worked in the industry before. Frabitore grew the team with large investments into the company's headquarters to enable it to support multiple locations.

Brian Sonoskus was executive chef at the cafe from 2001 to 2016. During his tenure he co-authored two Tupelo Honey cookbooks: Tupelo Honey Cafe: Spirited Recipes from Asheville's New South Kitchen, Tupelo Honey Cafe: new southern flavors from the Blue Ridge Mountains. Eric Gabrynowicz, a 2011 James Beard Foundation semifinalist for Rising Star Chef USA, was named executive chef and vice president of culinary operations.

During the COVID-19 pandemic, Tupelo Honey began the Tupelo Honey Employee Relief Fund (E.R.F) to help provide additional support to team members facing unexpected hardships. The profits from every order of biscuits goes directly to the fund. The fund is now called the Tupelo Honey Relief & Development Fund and had raised $575,000.

== Expansion ==
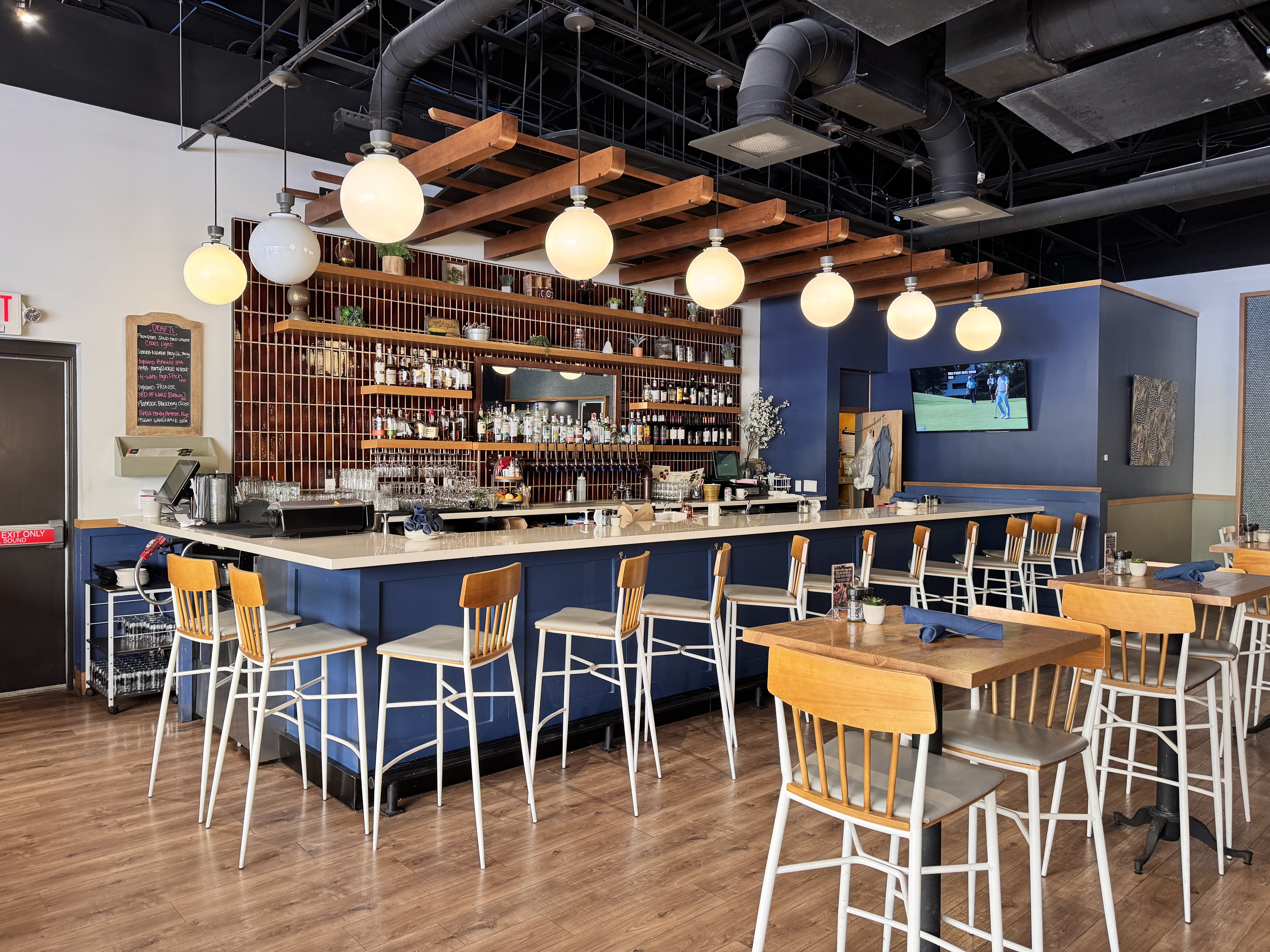
Interior of a Tupelo Honey Cafe

Tupelo Honey has expanded to 26 locations across 17 states. The newest location in Columbia, South Carolina is expected to open in the BullStreet District by early 2024.

In 2014, Tupelo Honey Cafe opened a location in Johnson City, Tennessee. This location was in the renovated Clinchfield Railroad train depot that featured a 16-foot train model replica of the city during the 1940s. This location subsequently closed in 2018.

== Reception ==
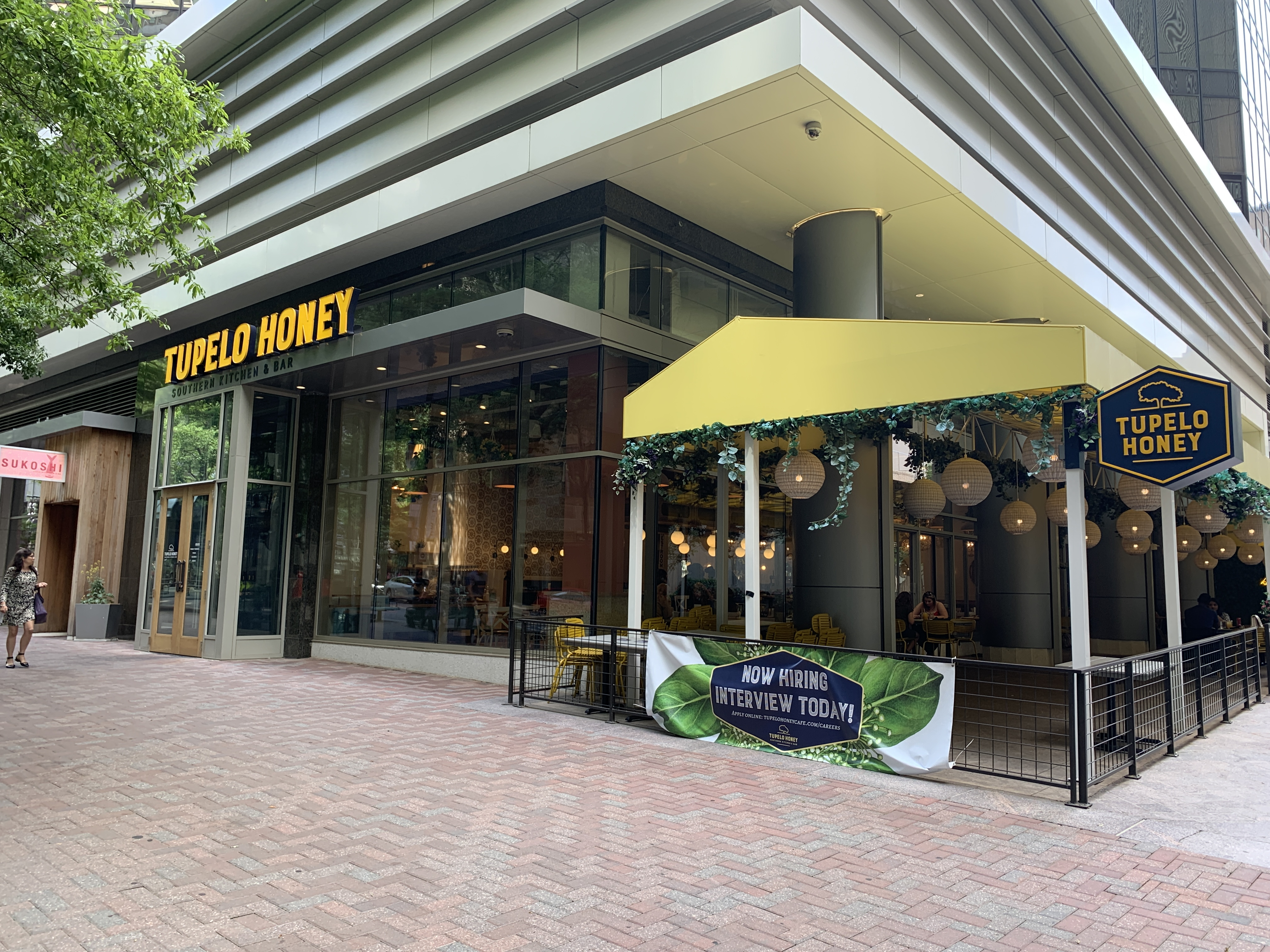
Charlotte location

Tupelo Honey Cafe was featured on Rachael Ray's $40 a Day show on the Food Network on November 14, 2004. Kita Vermond of The Globe and Mail, in her search for culinary treasures in North Carolina wrote of the restaurant serving traditional foods with a healthy twist, such as fried green tomatoes dished over goat-cheese grits and basil.
