= Statue of Christopher Columbus (Columbia, South Carolina) =

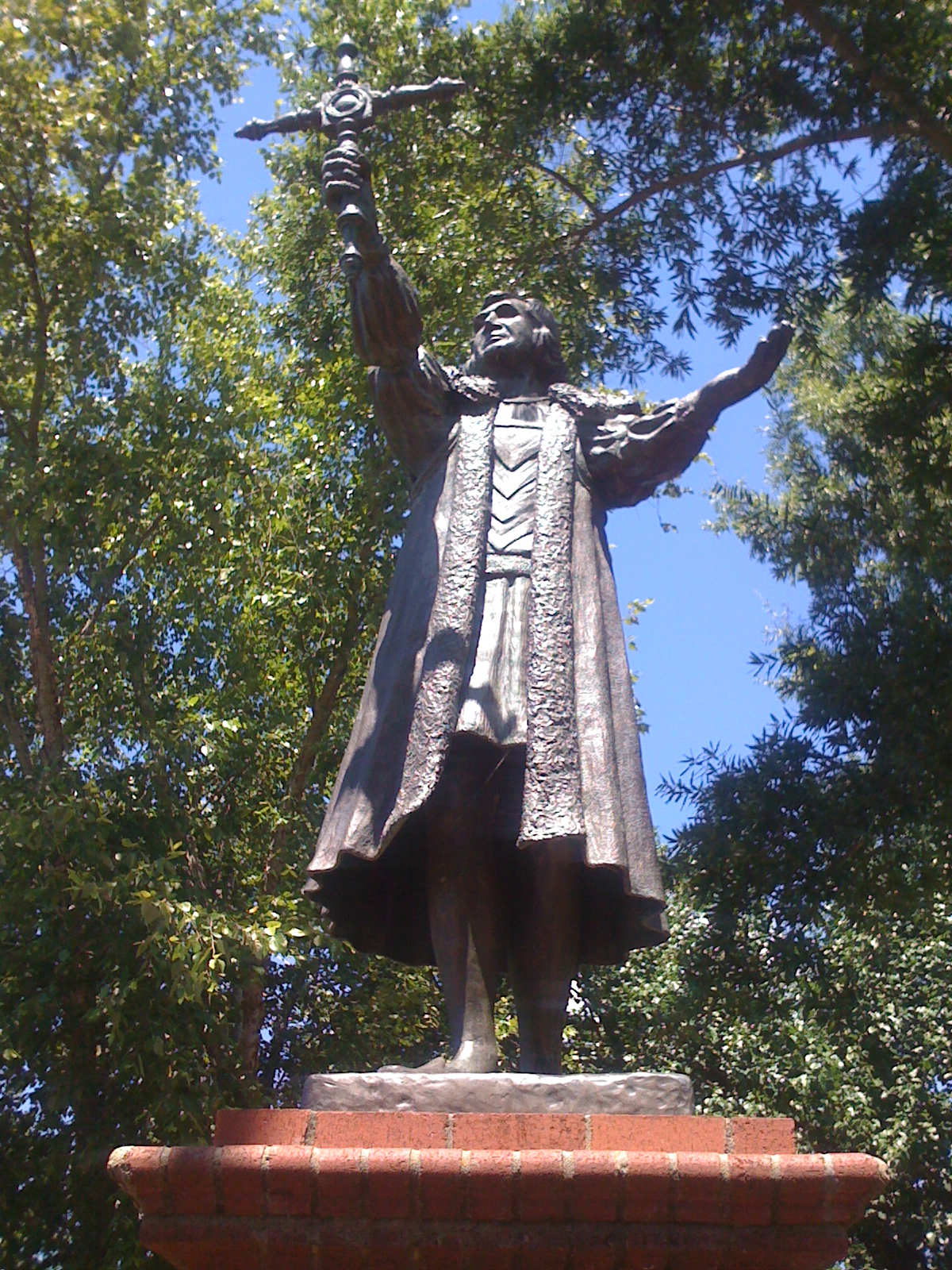
- The statue in 2010
- Interactive map of Statue of Christopher Columbus
- Location: Columbia, South Carolina, U.S.
- Coordinates: 34°0′10.27″N 81°3′18.81″W (approximate)
- Designer: Estelle Hampton Frierson and Stavros Alexander Chrysostomides
- Beginning date: 1992
- Dedicated date: October 11, 1992
- Dismantled date: June 2020

A statue of Christopher Columbus was installed in Columbia, South Carolina, United States as part of the Columbus Quincentenary. The memorial was removed and placed into storage in June 2020.

== History ==
According to the AP, Columbia was the first city in the United States to be named after Christopher Columbus. The city was named in 1786, winning over the name "Washington" in an 11-7 vote in the South Carolina Senate. The statue was donated by the South Carolina State Society of the Daughters of the American Revolution. The plaque was inscribed: "This gift to Columbia is a monument to the courageous spirit of that Genoese (Italy) mariner who challenged the unknown to discover this land, now the hope of the world and the haven of freedom for all."

It was located along a walking trail between the Columbia canal and the Congaree River.

Richtex, a local brick manufacturer, built the rectangular base. The bronze full-length statue was sculpted by American sculptors Stavros Alexander Chrysostomides and Estelle Hampton Frierson. Columbus held a cross in his right hand and his left hand was outstretched with his palm up. The statue faced the City of Columbia.

== Removal ==
The statue was vandalized in June 2020 amidst the George Floyd protests. According to Mayor Steve Benjamin, paint had been thrown on the statue multiple times in the week. The City of Columbia Public Works Department removed the statue and transported it to the South Carolina State Museum.

== See also ==
- List of monuments and memorials to Christopher Columbus
- List of monuments and memorials removed during the George Floyd protests
