= Jefferson Square =

Jefferson Square may refer to:

- Jefferson Square (Columbia), an office complex in Columbia, South Carolina
- Jefferson Square (Omaha), a defunct public park in Omaha, Nebraska
- Jefferson Square Mall, also known as Wilderness Mall, a defunct mall in Joliet, Illinois
