= DeAndrea G. Benjamin =

American judge (born 1972)

DeAndrea Gist Benjamin
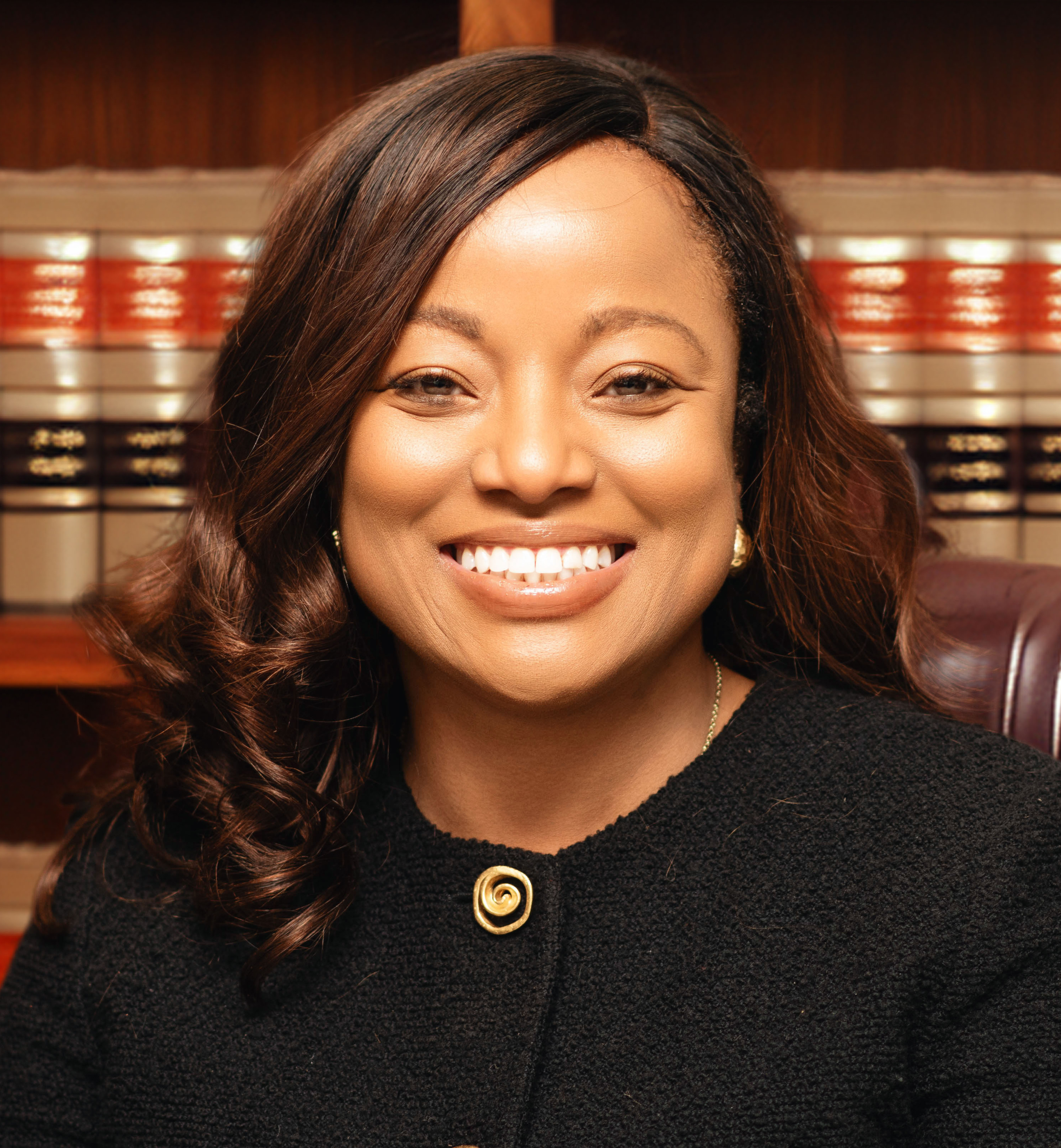

Judge of the United States Court of Appeals for the Fourth Circuit
- Incumbent
- Assumed office February 21, 2023
- Appointed by: Joe Biden
- Preceded by: Henry F. Floyd

Personal details
- Born: DeAndrea Donale Gist; October 4, 1972 (age 54) Columbia, South Carolina, U.S.
- Spouse: Stephen K. Benjamin (m. 2002)
- Education: Winthrop University (BA); University of South Carolina (JD)

DeAndrea Gist Benjamin (née Gist; born October 4, 1972) is an American lawyer serving as a United States circuit judge of the United States Court of Appeals for the Fourth Circuit. She previously served as a judge of the South Carolina Circuit Court for the Fifth Judicial Circuit.

== Early life and education ==
Benjamin was born in 1972 in Columbia, South Carolina, to Donald and Adrienne Gist. She graduated from Columbia High School in 1990. Benjamin earned a Bachelor of Arts degree from Winthrop University in 1994 and a Juris Doctor from the University of South Carolina School of Law in 1997.

== Career ==
In 1997 and 1998, Benjamin served as a law clerk for Judge L. Casey Manning of the Fifth Judicial Circuit of the South Carolina Circuit Court. In 1998 and 1999, she was an assistant solicitor in the Juvenile and Family Court Division of the Fifth Judicial Circuit Solicitor's Office. From 1999 to 2001, she served as an assistant attorney general in the South Carolina Attorney General's Office. Benjamin worked at the Gist Law Firm from 2001 to 2011.

In 2001, Governor Jim Hodges appointed Benjamin to the Juvenile Parole Board where she served from July 2001 to June 2004. From 2004 to 2011, she was a Columbia city judge. In February 2010, Benjamin had an unsuccessful bid for family court (Fifth Judicial Circuit Family Court, Seat 1). She was appointed to serve as a judge of the South Carolina Circuit Court for the Fifth Judicial Circuit in February 2, 2011. In 2021, Benjamin lost a bid for the South Carolina Court of Appeals. The South Carolina General Assembly instead chose then-family court judge Jay Vinson of Florence in a 94–63 vote.

=== Federal judicial service ===
On August 9, 2022, President Joe Biden announced his intent to nominate Benjamin to serve as a United States circuit judge for the United States Court of Appeals for the Fourth Circuit. On September 6, 2022, her nomination was sent to the Senate. President Biden nominated Benjamin to the seat vacated by Judge Henry F. Floyd, who assumed senior status on December 31, 2021. House Majority Whip Jim Clyburn recommended Benjamin for the vacancy. On November 15, 2022, a hearing on her nomination was held before the Senate Judiciary Committee. During her confirmation hearing, Republican senators questioned her decisions granting bond and early release of defendants. On December 8, 2022, her nomination was favorably reported by the committee by a 13–9 vote. On January 3, 2023, her nomination was returned to the President under Rule XXXI, Paragraph 6 of the United States Senate; she was renominated later the same day. On February 2, 2023, her nomination was favorably reported by the committee by a 12–8 vote. On February 2, 2023, Majority Leader Chuck Schumer filed cloture on her nomination. On February 7, 2023, the Senate invoked cloture on her nomination by a 54–43 vote. On February 9, 2023, her nomination was confirmed by a 53–44 vote. She received her judicial commission on February 21, 2023. She became the second African American woman to serve on the Fourth Circuit, and the first African American person from South Carolina to serve on the Fourth Circuit.

== Personal life ==
Benjamin married Stephen K. Benjamin in 2002. He served as mayor of Columbia from 2010 to 2022, and senior advisor to the President and director of the White House Office of Public Engagement in the Biden administration from 2023 to 2025. They have two daughters. In December 2013, Benjamin's brother Donald Gist Jr. was shot and killed in a parking lot of a Queens Mini-Mart store in Charlotte, North Carolina.

== See also ==
- List of African American federal judges
- List of African American jurists
- List of Delta Sigma Theta members#Judges

Legal offices
Preceded by Henry F. Floyd	Judge of the United States Court of Appeals for the Fourth Circuit; 2023–present	Incumbent
