= T. Patton Adams =

American politician and lawyer

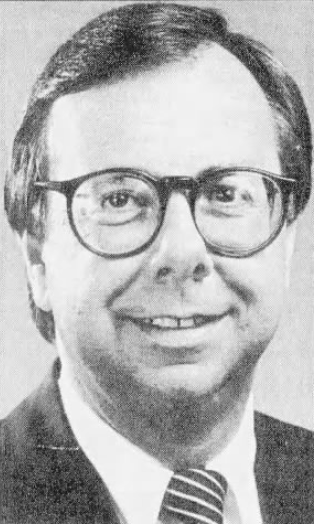

68th Mayor of Columbia
- In office July 1, 1986 – July 1, 1990
- Preceded by: Kirkman Finlay Jr.
- Succeeded by: Bob Coble

Personal details
- Born: February 16, 1943 (age 82); Columbia, South Carolina, U.S.
- Political party: Republican
- Spouse: Jackie Adams
- Children: 3
- Education: Washington and Lee University (BA); University of South Carolina School of Law (JD)

Thomas Patton Adams IV (born February 16, 1943) is a retired American politician and lawyer who served as a Columbia, South Carolina city councilman and as the 68th Mayor of Columbia, South Carolina. Adams also served in the Vietnam War as an officer in the United States Army Ordnance Corps, earning a Bronze Star Medal. Since 1986, he has served as the civilian aide to the Secretary of the Army for South Carolina, an appointment which in 2001 was extended for his lifetime. He is a recipient of the state's highest civilian honor, the Order of the Palmetto.

== Education ==
Patton Adams is an alumnus of Columbia High School, and was very active in the school's student council. He attended Washington and Lee University where he earned his bachelor's degree in political science in 1965. Later he decided to go back to Columbia, South Carolina where he would gain a juris doctor degree at the University of South Carolina School of Law in 1968.

== Career ==
After returning from Vietnam, Adams worked as a lawyer and began his political career in 1971 when he helped form the Shandon Neighborhood Council and served as its inaugural vice-president. He wanted to give the neighborhood he grew up in a voice in Columbia. In 1974, he was appointed to the Columbia Zoning Board of Adjustments. He later became an at-large member of the Columbia City Council, serving from 1976 to 1986. During his time on city council, Adams was a proponent of the railroad relocation project, which moved the railroad tracks in order for downtown Columbia to grow. This area would later be transformed into the Congaree Vista. At this time, Adams also took the lead in developing Riverfront Park. Subsequently, he assumed the role of Mayor of Columbia in 1986, succeeding Kirkman Finlay, Jr. shortly after Finlay began his South Carolina governor campaign, leaving the mayor's seat vacant. Adams' mayoral tenure ended in 1990 and was succeeded by Bob Coble.

=== Mayor of Columbia, SC ===
During Adams' tenure as mayor he created Memorial Park, chaired the drive to build the S.C. Vietnam Memorial, and transformed a worn-out industrial downtown area into Finlay Park, formally known as Sidney Park when the city was created in 1786. The planning and drawings of Finlay Park were done, partly while Kirkman Finlay, Jr. was mayor and the rest when Adams took over. One of Adams' major goals was to revitalize Columbia's downtown area with the Congaree Vista project, which was successful.

==== Annexation Controversy ====
In 1989, Adams took on a major annexation project for the expansion of retail and commercial properties as means to expand Columbia's tax base. Within this project, he controversially employed a shoestring annexation to add the Columbiana Centre to Columbia. This action provoked the city of Irmo in Lexington County and its residents. In the following years, on various occasions, Lexington County took the City of Columbia to Supreme Court on the subject as state law governing annexations was unclear. However, by 1996, all State v. City of Columbia cases concluded that the city's annexation was within legal right.

=== Later career ===
Adams focused on practicing law at his private firm until 1998. Then he became the general counsel and vice president for the South Carolina Hospital Association handling government relations in Columbia and Washington, D.C. In 2005, he began serving as the Executive Director of the South Carolina Commission on Indigent Defense (SCCID). Adams made drastically positive changes to the SCCID's existing central reporting system for statistical data in the delivery of indigent defense services. He implemented a case management system (CMS) that caused the SCCID's state funding to increase dramatically, due to the system's reliability. The Chief Justice issued a Supreme Court Administrative Order that mandated all indigent defense attorneys to enter new cases into the CMS. The CMS continues to be the foundation for the cloud-based and web-based indigent defense data systems used today. He stayed in this position at the SCCID until his retirement in 2017, where he selected Hugh Ryan to be his successor.

== Personal life ==
Patton married his wife, Jacquelyn (Jackie) Culbertson Adams, in 1968 shortly after graduating law school. They have three sons and four grandsons.
