= Daniel Rickenmann =

American politician (born 1969/70)

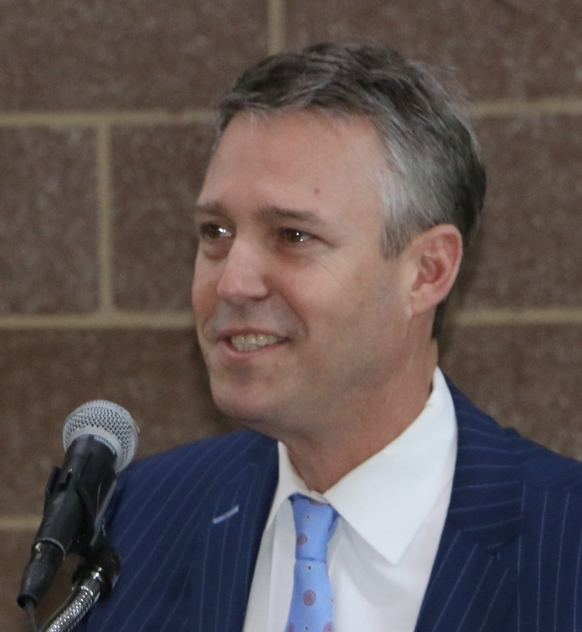
- Rickenmann in 2022

71st Mayor of Columbia
- Incumbent
- Assumed office January 4, 2022
- Preceded by: Stephen K. Benjamin

Personal details
- Born: 1969 or 1970 (age 55–56) Spartanburg, South Carolina, U.S.
- Party: Republican
- Spouse: Laura Rickenmann
- Children: 2
- Education: University of South Carolina (BA)
- Website: https://mayor.columbiasc.gov/

Daniel Rickenmann (born 1969/1970) is an American businessman and politician, serving as the 71st mayor of Columbia, South Carolina.

== Early life and education ==
Born in Spartanburg, South Carolina, Rickenmann is the son of immigrants from Switzerland. He attended the University of South Carolina in 1987.

== Political career ==
=== 2004 City council election ===
In 2004, Rickenmann was elected as an at-Large representative for Columbia City Council. He held the position until 2013 when he chose not to run for reelection. He ran again for city council in 2017, winning the election as a representative from Columbia's fourth district.

=== 2021 mayoral election ===
After confirmation in February 2021 that incumbent Mayor Stephen K. Benjamin would not seek re-election, Rickenmann announced his bid for the office. Other candidates were At-Large Columbia City Councilwoman Tameika Isaac Devine, attorney Sam Johnson, and former Columbia City Councilman Moe Baddourah. On November 16, 2021, Rickenmann won the runoff election against Isaac Devine with 52% to 48% of the vote. He was sworn in as mayor of Columbia on January 4, 2022.

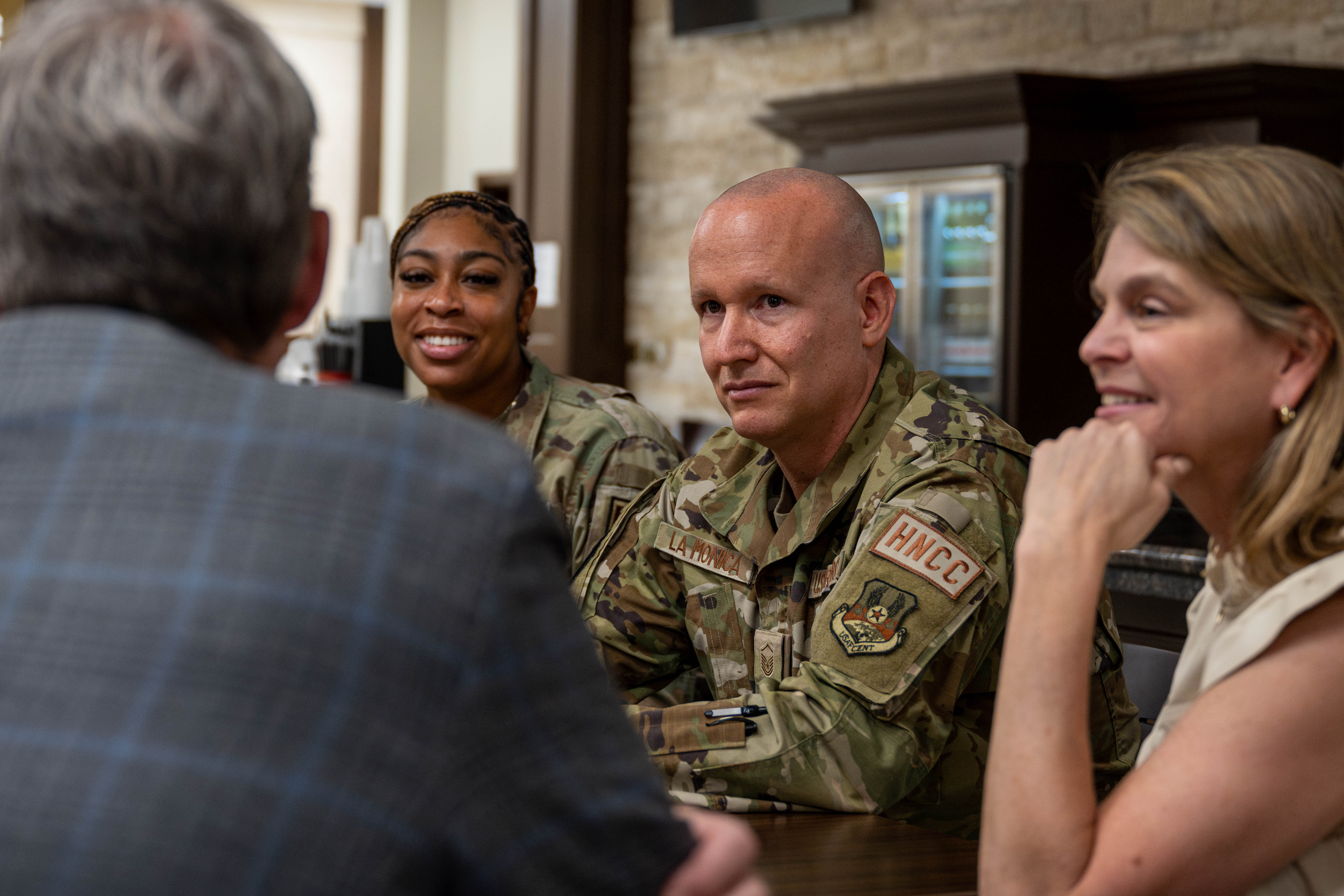
U.S. airmen assigned to the 379th Air Expeditionary Wing listen to Rickenmann (left) during a mayoral delegation visit within the U.S. Central Command area of responsibility, November 20, 2024.

Rickenmann ranked Number 2 in The Post and Courier Columbia Power List 2023. and 2024. He ranked number 6 on the Post and Courier Columbia's 2025 Power List.

While candidates for the office of mayor in Columbia, South Carolina, are officially non-partisan, Rickenmann is a Republican. Conversely, his opponent in the 2021 election, Tameika Isaac Devine, is a Democrat. Devine was endorsed by former U.S. president Barack Obama and House Whip Jim Clyburn. Previously, Columbia had historically voted for Democratic candidates, including Joe Biden for U.S. president by nearly 40 points. Its two previous mayors, Bob Coble and Steve Benjamin, were Democrats.

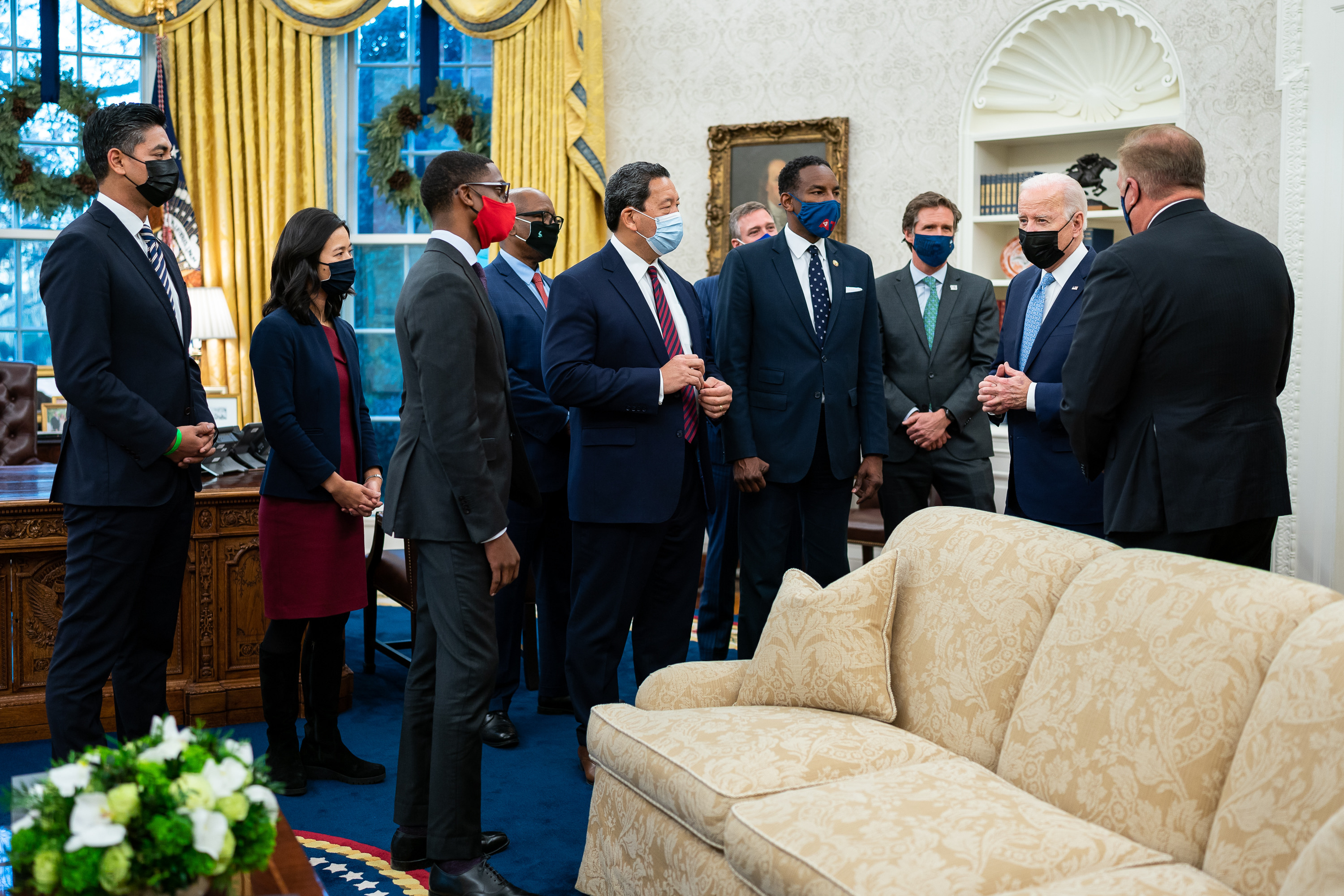
Rickenmann (5th from the right) in the Oval Office with other newly elected mayors, 2023

==== Endorsements ====
In June 2023, Rickenmann endorsed Tim Scott in the 2024 United States presidential election.

=== 2025 Mayoral election ===
In March 2025, Rickenmann announced his re-election bid for Mayor. He faced challenges from Jessica Thomas and Wade Fulmer Jr., and won re-election on November 4, 2025.

==== Mayoral race endorsements ====
Rickenmann was endorsed by The State Newspaper.

Rickenmann and other city officials was sworn in on January 5, 2026.

=== National leadership ===
On June 7, 2026, Rickenmann was elected 2nd Vice President of the United States Conference of Mayors.

== Electoral history ==
Election for mayor of Columbia, 2025
Candidate	Votes	%
Daniel Rickenmann	9,398	61.53
Jessica S. Thomas	4,943	32.36
Wade Fulmer Jr.	845	5.53
Write-in	89	0.58
Total	15,275	100%

Runoff election for mayor of Columbia, 2021 (Note: Rickenmann and Devine went to a runoff election since no candidate won more than 50% of the vote in the initial election.)
Candidate	Votes	%
Daniel Rickenmann	10,606	52
Tameika Isaac Devine	9,789	48
Total	20,395	100%

Election for mayor of Columbia, 2021
Candidate	Votes	%
Daniel Rickenmann	8,417	43.51
Tameika Isaac Devine	5,846	30.22
Sam Johnson	4,710	24.35
Moe Baddourah	364	1.88
Write-in	9	0.05
Total	19,346	100%

== See also ==
- Mayor of Columbia, South Carolina

== Notes ==
Political offices
Preceded by Stephen K. Benjamin	Mayor of Columbia; 2022–present	Incumbent
