= Columbia High School (South Carolina) =

Public high school in Columbia, South Carolina, United States

Location
- 1701 Westchester Drive; Columbia, South Carolina 29210; United States
- Coordinates: 34°3′0″N 81°5′30″W

Information
- Type: College Prep public school
- Founded: 1884 (142 years ago)
- School district: Richland County School District One
- Principal: Shawn Washington, Ed.D
- Staff: 46.50 (FTE)
- Grades: 9–12
- Enrollment: 693 (2023–2024)
- Student to teacher ratio: 14.90
- Colors: Maroon and gold
- Mascot: Capital
- Website: columbia.richlandone.org

Columbia High School a public high school in the St. Andrews area of Columbia, South Carolina, United States. Columbia High School was originally housed in the former Columbia Female Academy (established 1816) at 1323 Washington Street at the corner with Marion Street. This building was leased to the Richland County Commissioners of Schools in 1884. The school became Columbia's first public high school in 1895 as the Washington Street School. The original Columbia High School building was constructed in 1915 on that site. The current building was constructed in 1975.

== Activities ==
=== Athletics ===
Columbia High fields teams in the following sports:

- Football
- Volleyball
- Tennis
- Soccer
- Basketball
- Softball
- Baseball
- Track & field
- Wrestling
- Cross country
- Cheerleading
- Color guard

== Notable alumni ==
- Weston Adams – former United States Ambassador, managing partner of the Weston Adams Law Firm and film producer.
- Kimberly Clarice Aiken – former Miss America (1994)
- Joseph Bernardin – former Cardinal for the Catholic Church
- DeAndrea G. Benjamin – lawyer
- Bob Bowman – swimming coach, who is best known as the coach of Michael Phelps
- Randy Brooks – actor
- John R. Carpenter – geochemist
- J. Michelle Childs – lawyer and jurist
- Mary Lillian Ellison – former professional wrestler known by her ring name "The Fabulous Moolah"
- Kirkman Finlay Jr. – former Mayor of Columbia, South Carolina
- T. Patton Adams – former Mayor of Columbia, South Carolina
- William Price Fox – American novelist
- Angelo King – former National Football League (NFL) linebacker
- Craig Melvin – journalist
- Irene Krugman Rudnick, lawyer, educator, and state legislator

== Bibliography ==
- Maxey, Russell The Columbia High School Story, Palmetto Publishing Company, Columbia, SC, 1984. ISBN 0-9613853-0-8
