= McMaster School =

- U.S. National Register of Historic Places
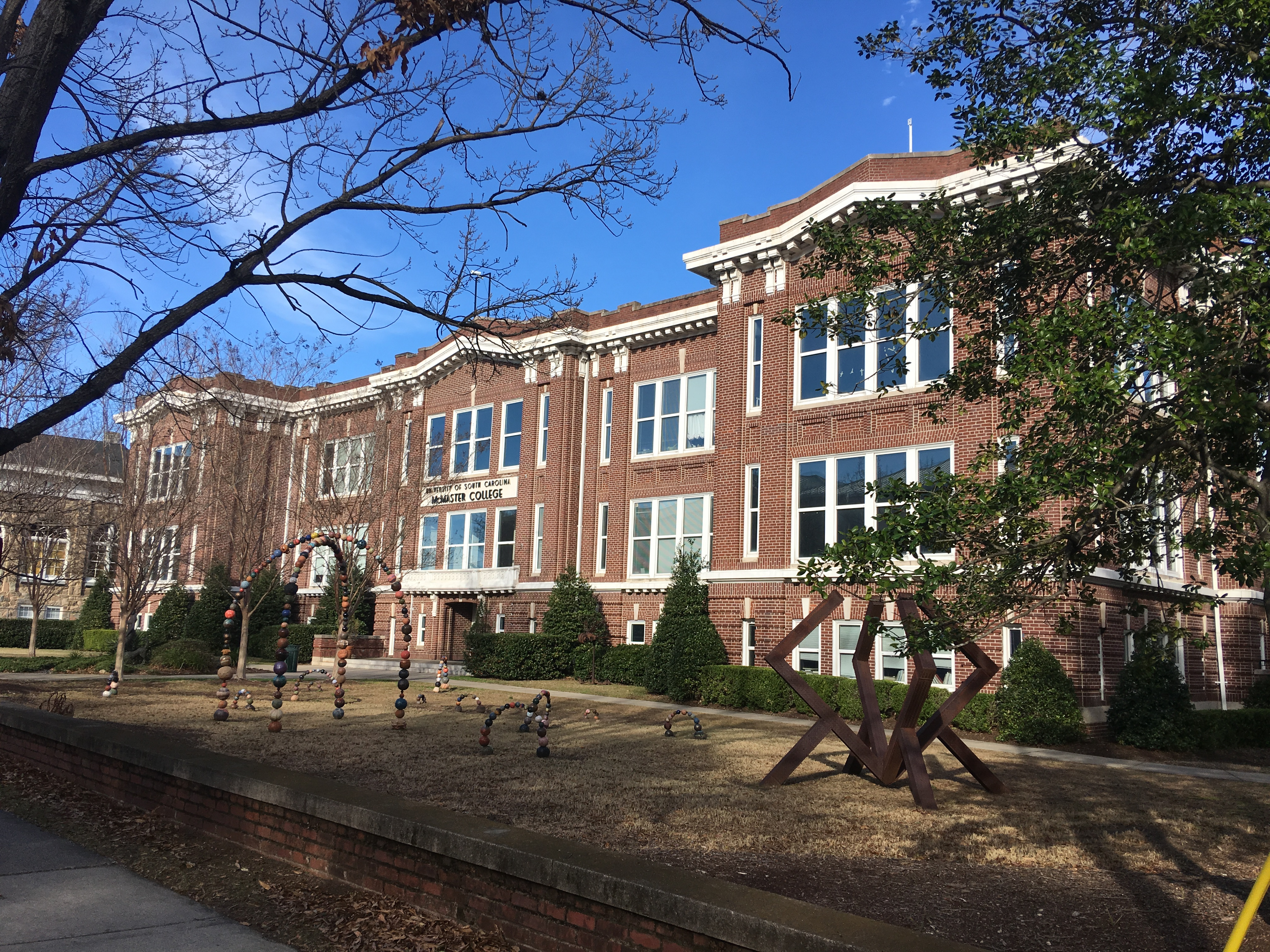

- Location within South Carolina Location within the United States
- Location: Columbia, South Carolina
- Coordinates: 34°00′09″N 81°01′35″W
- Area: 2 acres (0.81 ha)
- Built: 1911
- Architect: William Augustus Edwards of Edwards & Walters
- NRHP reference No.: 97000777
- Added to NRHP: July 25, 1997

The McMaster School, built in 1911, is an historic building located at 1106 Pickens Street on the corner of Senate Street in Columbia, South Carolina. It was designed by noted Columbia architect William Augustus Edwards of the firm of Edwards and Walter. Edwards and his partner, Frank C. Walter, designed sixteen schools according to standardized guidelines established by the state legislature in 1905. The architects chose a Renaissance Revival style with H-shaped floor plans used as the standard for the state in buildings designed and constructed by other architects. The State newspaper declared it the "handsomest school building in Columbia" when it opened in 1911.

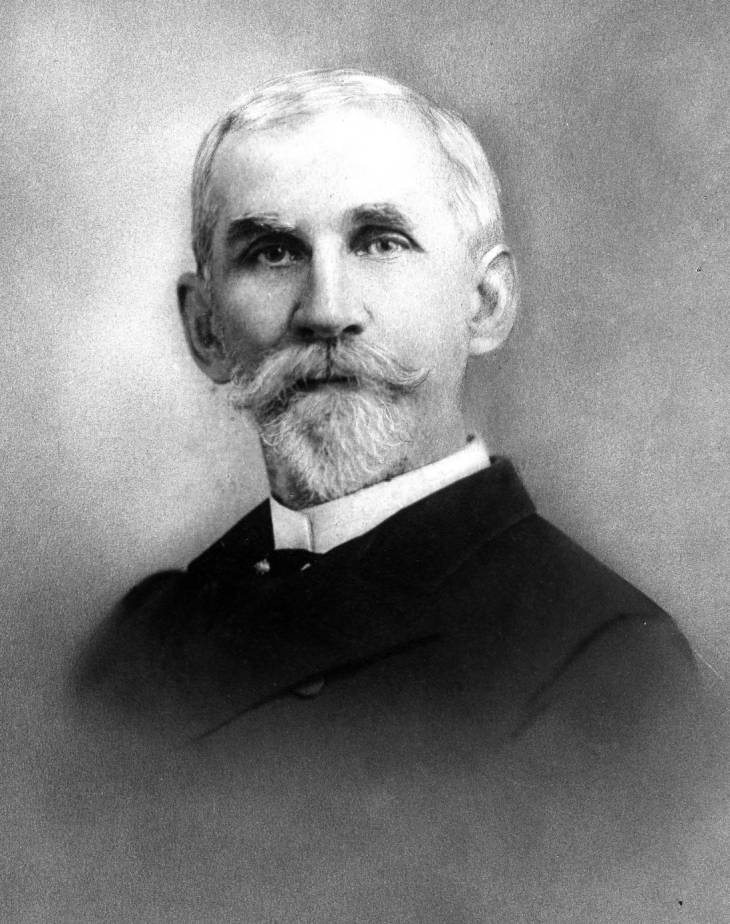
Fitz William McMaster in 1890

The local school administration named the building after Fitz William McMaster (1826-99), honoring his contributions to organizing Columbia's public schools, his leadership as a Confederate colonel, and his role in white supremacist resistance to Reconstruction in their dedication. South Carolina's current governor, Henry McMaster, is a descendant of Fitz William McMaster.

The building served as a public primary school for white children until 1956, when school districts across the state were consolidated in response to the state's low literacy rates, gaps between urban and rural schools, and federal mandates to end racial segregation.

The University of South Carolina purchased the building in 1960 and renamed it McMaster College. UofSC renovated the building to house the music and art departments and added an auditorium and rehearsal hall. The School of Music moved into its own building in 1993 and the Department of Art took over, replacing the auditorium with a substantial addition that doubled the building's square footage in 1997–99. The Department of Art rebranded as the School of Visual Art and Design in 2015.

On July 25, 1997, it was added to the National Register of Historic Places.

== See also ==
- List of Registered Historic Places in South Carolina
