= Jefferson Square (Columbia) =

Office buildings in Columbia, South Carolina

Coordinates: 34°0′36.4″N 81°2′18.3″W

Jefferson Square office tower.

Jefferson Square, an office complex in downtown Columbia, South Carolina, is the headquarters of the state's Department of Health and Human Services which oversees the Medicaid program for South Carolinians. Located at 1801 Main St. in the city's historic Arsenal Hill neighborhood, the complex includes a 15-story, 150,000 sq ft (14,000 m^{2}) office tower and a two-story courtyard plaza. Also on the Jefferson Square block (bordered by Laurel, Assembly, Richland, and Main) are the offices of Wilson-Kibler real estate, two parking garages, a parking lot, and the Arsenal Hill Associate Reformed Presbyterian Church.

== More Photos ==
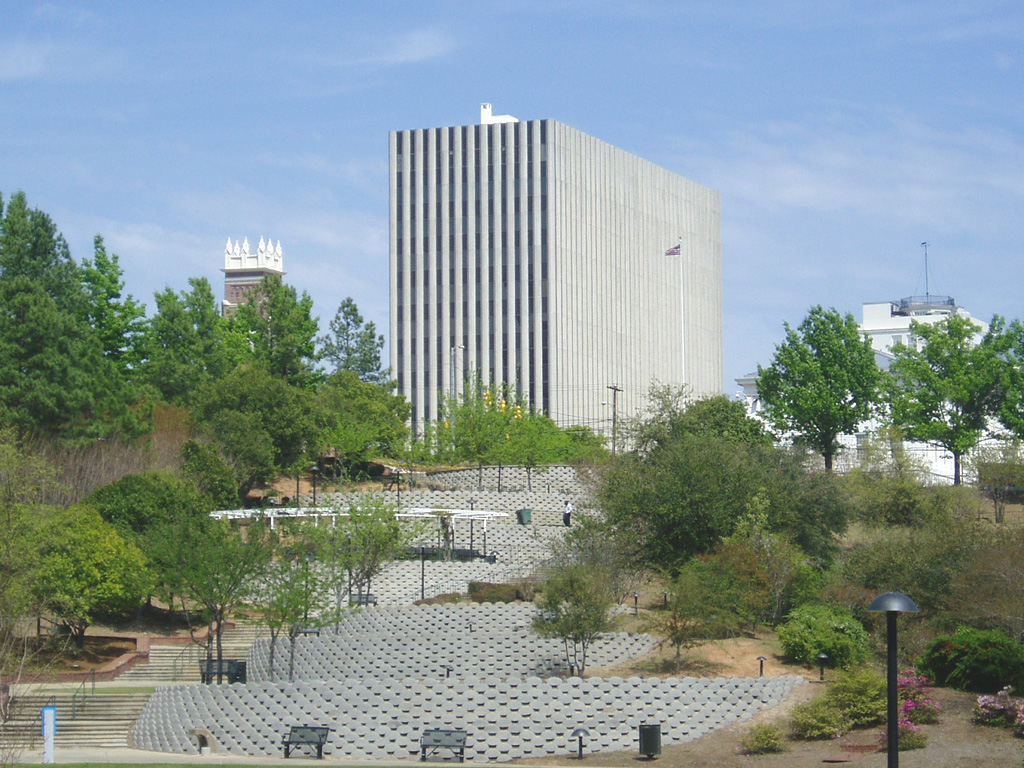
Jefferson Square seen from Finlay Park.

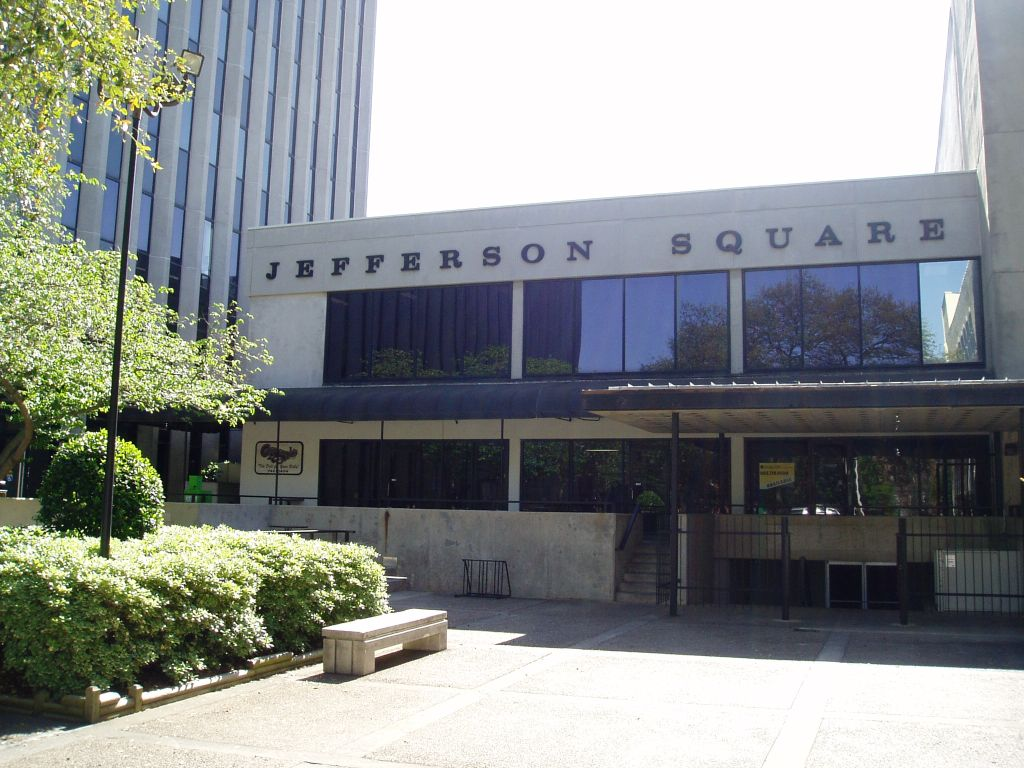
Courtyard at Jefferson Square.

Historical marker.

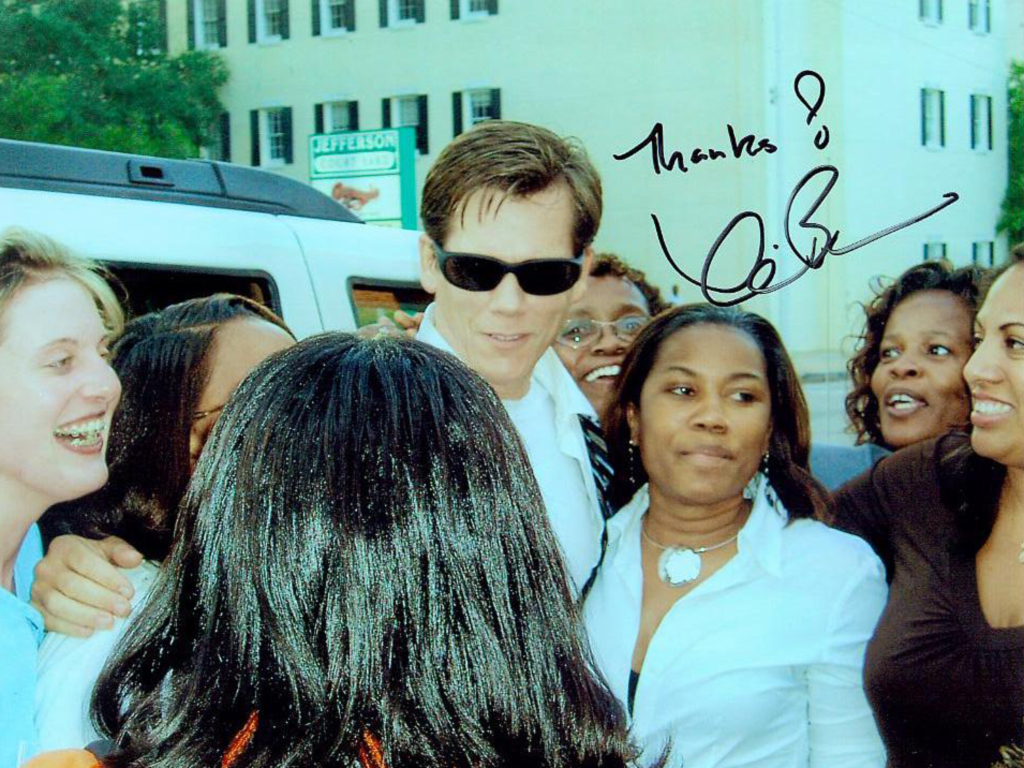
Autographed photo of Kevin Bacon in front of Jefferson courtyard.
