= George Floyd protests in South Carolina =

2020 civil unrest after the murder of George Floyd

- Part of George Floyd protests
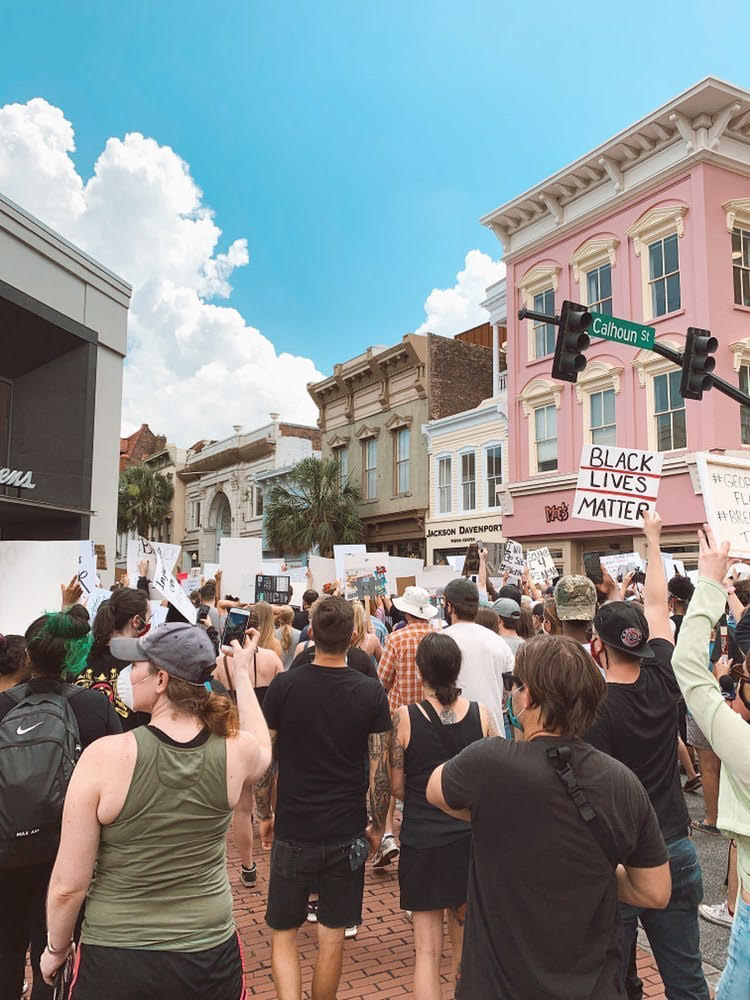
- Protesters in Charleston on May 30, 2020
- Date: May 30 – June 20, 2020 (3 weeks)
- Location: South Carolina, United States
- Caused by: Police brutality; Institutional racism against African Americans; Reaction to the murder of George Floyd; Economic, racial and social inequality

Cities in South Carolina in which a protest with about 100 or more participants was held

This is a list of protests in South Carolina related to the murder of George Floyd.

== Locations ==
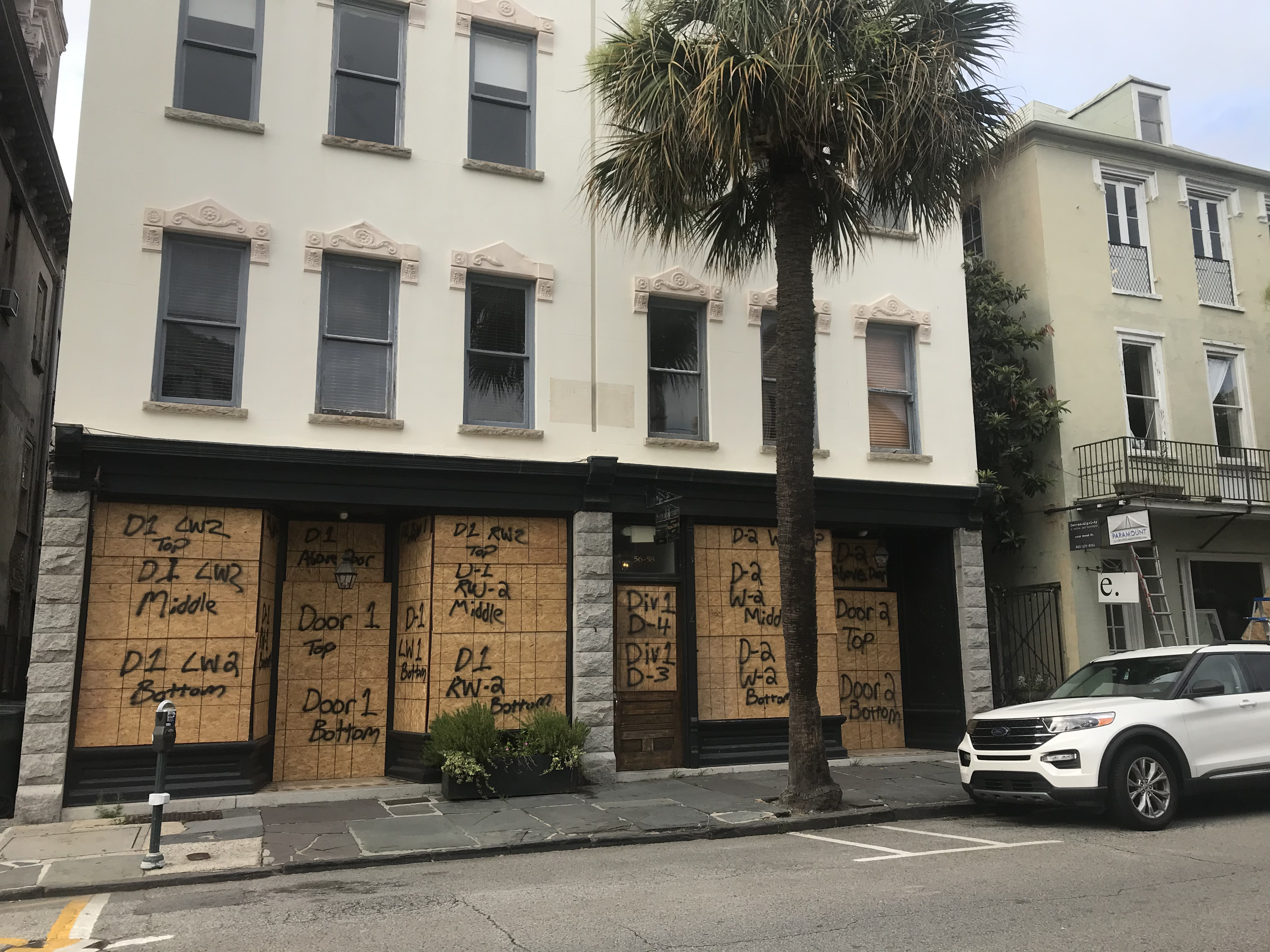
Business in downtown Charleston with boarded windows on May 31 after protests escalated the previous night.

=== Aiken ===
On May 30, more than 50 protesters marched peacefully down Newberry Street in Downtown Aiken past the Aiken County Courthouse.

=== Anderson ===
On June 3, up to 500 people peacefully marched in the streets downtown to support Black Lives Matter and George Floyd, walking twice around the Anderson County Courthouse.

=== Beaufort ===
Several protested the murder of George Floyd and the death of Trey Pringle, a black man who died after being tased by sheriff's deputies in 2018.

=== Bluffton ===
Hundreds paraded near Eagle Field to protest the murders of George Floyd and Ahmaud Arbery, and the killing of Breonna Taylor.

=== Charleston ===
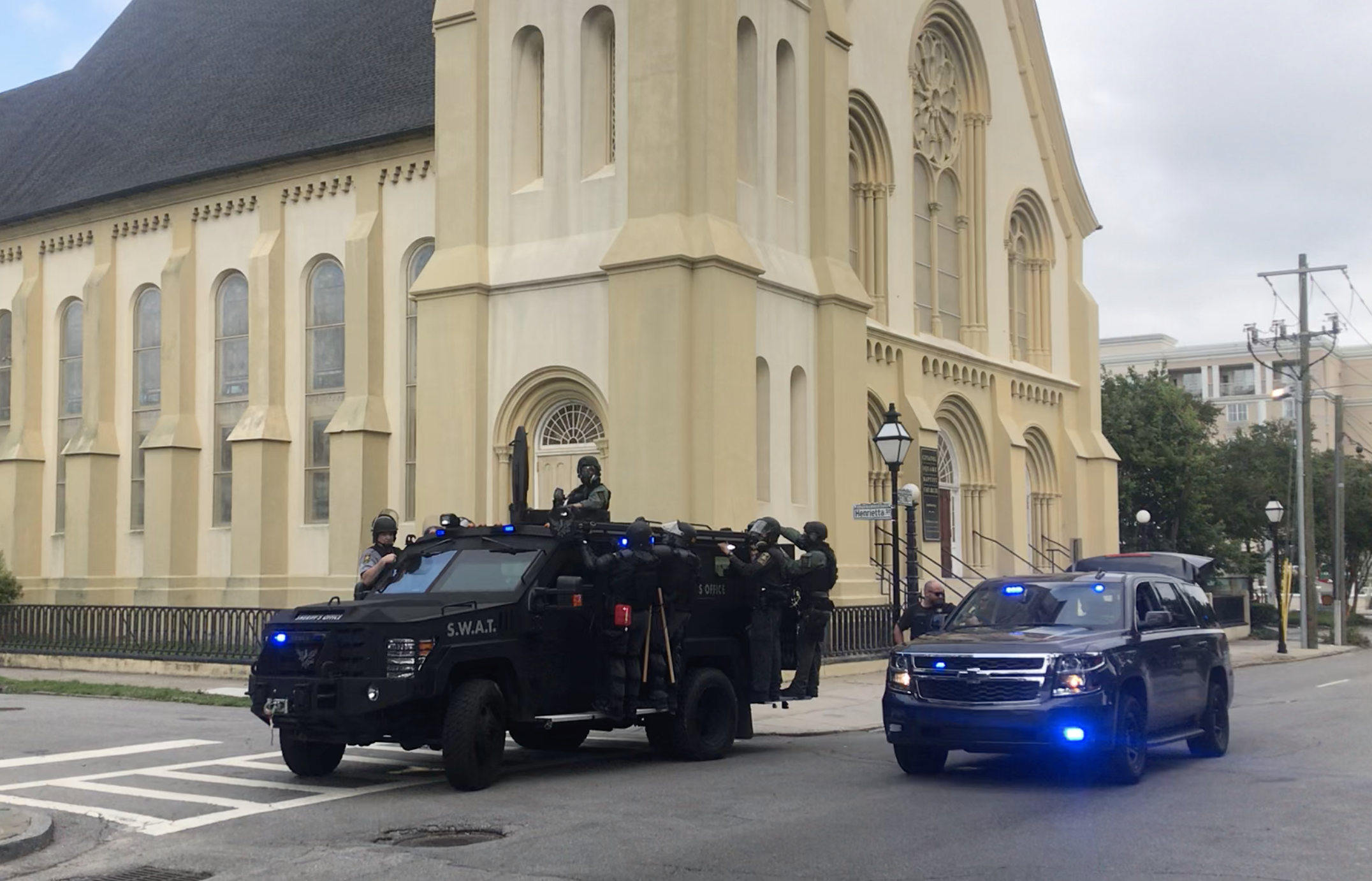
SWAT units imposing a curfew in Charleston County on May 31.

The city issued a curfew after protests resulted in vandalism of public property and statues and some protesters threw rocks at police and citizens. Additionally, several businesses and restaurants had glass windows busted. Two men wearing MAGA hats were assaulted. At one point, police in riot gear used tear gas to stall protesters. Protesters halted traffic on Interstate-26. The following day, a group of 200 protesters formed in Marion Square. One protester, identified as Gee Jordan, was arrested in Marion Square after praising police officers, having stated "I love each and every one of you. [...] I am not your enemy. You are not my enemy." He was charged with "disobeying lawful order" and has since been released from jail on bond. Charleston Police Chief Luther Reynolds defended the arrest, stating that "We specifically asked for [the protesters], numerous times, to disperse. We said if you don't, you will be arrested".

=== Columbia ===
On May 30, 2020, protesters marched from the South Carolina Statehouse to the city of Columbia police station. Several businesses and restaurants in the nearby business district were vandalized. Mayor Stephen K. Benjamin announced a mandatory 6 p.m. curfew for the city. Four police officers were injured, one critically. Later that night shots were fired at police, and the shooters were arrested. The officers did not return fire.

=== Florence ===
On June 10, around fifty doctors and nurses held a moment of silence for eight minutes and forty-six seconds outside the MUSC Health Florence Medical Center to honor George Floyd.

=== Fort Mill ===
On June 4, over 1,000 protesters peacefully marched down S.C. 160 to protest George Floyd's murder and support Black Lives Matter.

=== Greenville ===
On May 30, two protests were held at Peace Center and Falls Park. Not affiliated with Black Lives Matter, the first event was attended by Mayor Knox White. About 300 people marched at the second protest, some arrests were made.

=== Hilton Head ===
Thousands gathered on June 7 for a protest following a vehicle procession.

=== Myrtle Beach ===
Hundreds of protesters attended a rally downtown on the morning of May 31. Protesters initially blocked the entrance to the Myrtle Beach Police Station in what felt like a "standoff" but when officers joined in and the Chief addressed the crowd cheered. Mayor Brenda Bethune declared a civil emergency due to a "credible threat" against police related to the protest. A curfew was set to start at 7pm May 31.

=== North Augusta ===
On June 20, hundreds of protesters organized by Unify: North Augusta marched from the North Augusta Municipal Building down Georgia Avenue to Calhoun Park. Protesters centered around the Merriweather Monument at a rally held in Calhoun Park with chants for removal of the monument commemorating the Hamburg Massacre.

=== North Charleston ===
On June 4, around 100 protesters marched from Park Circle down to East Montague Avenue to rally against police brutality.

=== Rock Hill ===
On May 30, hundreds of protesters gathered for a demonstration at Fountain Park. The protest was hosted by pastor C.T. Kirk.

=== Sumter ===
On May 30, a peaceful protest was held outside the Sumter Police Department to voice support for George Floyd.
