= Irene Krugman Rudnick =

American politician (1929–2019)

Member of the South Carolina House of Representatives from the 81st/Aiken County district
- In office 1972–1976
- In office 1981–1984
- In office 1987–1994

Personal details
- Born: Irene Krugman; December 27, 1929 Columbia, South Carolina, U.S.
- Died: February 2, 2019 (aged 89) Aiken, South Carolina, U.S.
- Party: Democratic
- Spouse: Harold Rudnick
- Children: Morris Rudnick, Helen Rudnick Rapoport
- Education: University of South Carolina A.B., cum laude, 1949, J.D., 1952, Doctor of Education
- Occupation: Lawyer

Irene Krugman Rudnick (December 27, 1929 – February 2, 2019) was an American politician in the state of South Carolina. Rudnick served in the South Carolina House of Representatives from 1972 to 1976, 1981 to 1984, and 1987 to 1994 representing Aiken County, South Carolina.

A lawyer, Rudnick was the first Jewish woman to be elected to the South Carolina Legislature.

== Background ==
Rudnick was born in Columbia, South Carolina and graduated from Columbia High School. She received her bachelor's and law degrees from University of South Carolina. While in law school, she was one of the first female members of the South Carolina Law Review. Rudnick practiced law in Aiken, South Carolina, and also taught at USC Aiken. She also taught at an elementary school.
