= Halpern v. Wake Forest University Health Sciences =

US court case

- Court: United States Court of Appeals for the Fourth Circuit
- Started: December 8, 2011
- Decided: February 28, 2012
- Citation: "10-2162.P" (PDF). United States Court of Appeals for the Fourth Circuit. March 14, 2012.

Case history
- Appealed from: United States District Court for the Middle District of North Carolina

Court membership
- Judges sitting: Paul V. Niemeyer; Diana Gribbon Motz; Henry F. Floyd

Case opinions
- Decision by: Henry F. Floyd

Halpern v. Wake Forest University Health Sciences (4th Cir. Feb 28, 2012) was a court case in which the United States Court of Appeals for the Fourth Circuit upheld a lower court's decision to grant summary judgment in favor of Wake Forest University Health Sciences. The medical school expelled a student due to ongoing unprofessional conduct, which the student attributed to ADHD and anxiety disorder. The court held that professionalism was an essential requirement of a medical school program in part because "inappropriate and disruptive behavior by physicians increases adverse patient outcomes".

== Background ==
Ronen Halpern attended Wake Forest's Doctor of Medicine program from July 2004 until March 2009. Diagnosed with ADHD and anxiety disorder, Halpern took prescription medications for treatment. His challenges with professionalism surfaced shortly after he began attending the medical school and continued throughout his enrollment. Instances of mistreatment of staff, unexplained absences, and poor interpersonal skills were reported. In 2006, Halpern failed his first rotation because of "regular lapses in professionalism." He subsequently went on medical leave to address significant side effects from his medications. Halpern returned in April 2007 and completed ten clinical rotations successfully, although some incidents of unprofessional behavior persisted.

In November 2008, Halpern neglected to send thank-you letters to scholarship donors, despite multiple reminders. Consequently, and due to his probationary status following his initial rotation failure, the medical school forwarded his file to the student progress and promotions committee, which recommended dismissal. After internal appeals, Halpern suggested a strict probation plan as part of an alternative solution, which would have also included psychiatric treatment, and participation in a program for troubled physicians. The school's dean, however, decided to expel Halpern, reasoning that the plan would not sufficiently address the concerns regarding professionalism.

== Legal proceedings ==
Halpern filed a lawsuit under the Rehabilitation Act and the Americans with Disabilities Act (ADA). The district court ruled in favor of the defendant, asserting that Halpern was not "otherwise qualified" and that his proposed accommodation was unreasonable. The Fourth Circuit unanimously upheld this decision. To demonstrate a violation of either Act, the plaintiff must prove that (1) they have a disability, (2) they are otherwise qualified to participate in the defendant's program, and (3) they were excluded from the program due to their disability.

Although the Court found that Halpern's disabilities warranted protection under both the ADA and the Rehabilitation Act, the Court accorded "substantial deference" to the school's professional judgments concerning required qualifications and the reasonableness of accommodations. It determined that professionalism was a critical component of the Medical School's program and that, in the absence of an accommodation, Halpern could not meet this requirement. In spite of Halpern's completion of ten rotations, the Court cited "considerable evidence of Halpern's unprofessional behavior."

Additionally, the Court dismissed Halpern's proposed accommodation – psychiatric treatment, participation in a program for troubled physicians, and ongoing strict probation – as it was untimely, had an indefinite timeframe, and an uncertain likelihood of success. The Court also rejected the assertion that Wake Forest had not engaged in an interactive process.
