= John R. Carpenter =

American geochemist (1938–2025)

- Born: John Richard Carpenter; May 20, 1938; Galveston, Texas, U.S.
- Died: November 10, 2025 (aged 87); Chapin, South Carolina, U.S.
- Education: Florida State University
- Occupation: Geochemist

John Richard Carpenter (May 20, 1938 – November 10, 2025) was an American geochemist.

== Early life and career ==
Carpenter was born in Galveston, Texas on May 20, 1938, the son of Elmo Milton Carpenter and Rosemary Prendergast. He attended and graduated from Columbia High School. After graduating, he attended Rice University, majoring in chemistry. He also attended Florida State University, earning his PhD degree in 1964.

Carpenter served as a professor in the department of geological sciences at the University of South Carolina from 1966 to 2000. During his years as a professor, in 1999, he was named a distinguished professor.

== Personal life and death ==
In 1958, Carpenter married Charlene Jakeman. Their marriage lasted until Carpenter's death in 2025.

Carpenter died in Chapin, South Carolina on November 10, 2025, at the age of 87.
