= Mary Geiger Lewis =

American judge (born 1958)

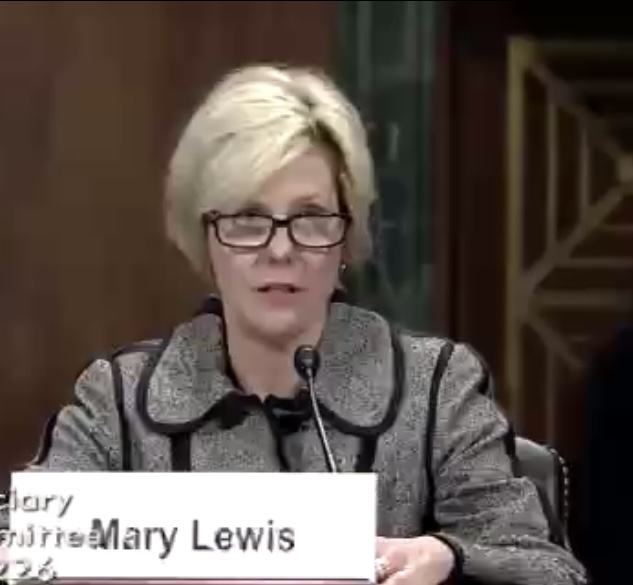

Judge of the United States District Court for the District of South Carolina
- Incumbent
- Assumed office June 20, 2012
- Appointed by: Barack Obama
- Preceded by: Henry F. Floyd

Personal details
- Born: Mary Wallis Geiger; December 18, 1958 (age 67) Columbia, South Carolina, U.S.
- Spouse: A. Camden Lewis
- Children: 2
- Education: Clemson University (BA); University of South Carolina (JD)

Mary Wallis Geiger Lewis (born December 18, 1958) is a United States district judge of the United States District Court for the District of South Carolina.

== Early life and education ==
Lewis was born on December 18, 1958, in Columbia, South Carolina. She received a Bachelor of Arts from Clemson University in 1980 and a Juris Doctor from the University of South Carolina School of Law in 1984, graduating Order of the Coif.

== Career ==
Lewis worked as a law clerk to South Carolina Circuit Court Judge Owens Taylor Cobb, Jr. from 1984 to 1985. From 1985 to 2012 she worked at Lewis & Babcock, LLP, starting as an associate in 1985 and becoming a partner in 1987.

=== Federal judicial service ===
Representative Jim Clyburn recommended Lewis to fill a judicial vacancy on the United States District Court for the District of South Carolina that was created by the elevation of Judge Henry F. Floyd to the United States Court of Appeals for the Fourth Circuit. On March 16, 2011, President Barack Obama formally nominated Lewis to the District of South Carolina. On February 15, 2012, Lewis received a hearing before the Senate Judiciary Committee. On March 8, 2012, the Judiciary Committee reported her nomination to the floor of the Senate by an 11–6 vote. On June 18, 2012, the Senate confirmed Geiger's nomination by a 64–27 vote. She received her commission on June 20, 2012.

== Personal ==
Lewis and her husband, A. Camden Lewis, have two children. Lewis is a member of the Pi Beta Phi fraternity.

Legal offices
Preceded by Henry F. Floyd	Judge of the United States District Court for the District of South Carolina; 2012–present	Incumbent
