= Fitz William McMaster =

American Confederate officer

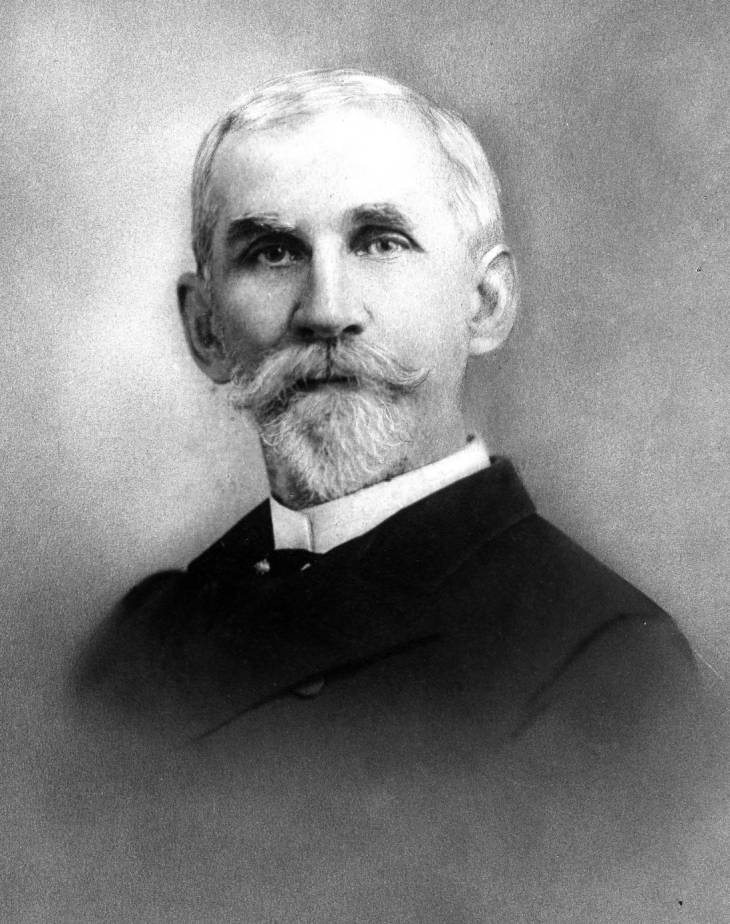
- Fitz William McMaster circa 1890

49th Mayor of Columbia, South Carolina
- In office 1890–1892
- Preceded by: John Taylor Rhett
- Succeeded by: Walter Coles Fisher

Member of the South Carolina Senate from Richland County
- In office 1886–1890

Member of the South Carolina House of Representatives from Richland County
- In office November 25, 1884 – November 23, 1886

Personal details
- Born: Fitz William McMaster; March 23, 1826 Fairfield, South Carolina
- Died: September 10, 1899 (aged 73) Mars Hill, North Carolina
- Party: Democratic
- Spouse: Mary Jane Macfie

Military service
- Allegiance: Confederate States
- Branch/service: Confederate States Army
- Years of service: 1861–1865
- Rank: Colonel
- Battles/wars: American Civil War

Fitz William McMaster (March 23, 1826 – September 10, 1899) was an American lawyer and politician.

== Early life and career ==
McMaster was born in Fairfield, South Carolina, and was educated at South Carolina College (now the University of South Carolina). He earned the rank of colonel in the army of the Confederate States of America. Following the conclusion of the Civil War and during Reconstruction, McMaster worked as a lawyer. He served as the defense attorney for Edward T. Avery, one of nearly five hundred white men indicted for affiliation with the Ku Klux Klan.

== Politics and civic life ==
After the fraudulent and violent election of governor Wade Hampton III ended Reconstruction, McMaster served as a judge, state representative, and state senator in the Democrat-led government that established Jim Crow. His advocacy strengthened and expanded the state’s segregated public education system begun during Reconstruction. In the 1880s, he rallied politicians to fund Columbia’s schools and helped to found the Winthrop Normal and Industrial College of South Carolina (now Winthrop University) to train white teachers. He was also mayor of Columbia and an active member of Camp Hampton, a Civil War veterans organization that promoted the Lost Cause. McMaster died in 1899.

== Legacy ==
The Columbia, South Carolina, school administration named a grammar school building located at the corner of Senate and Pickens Streets in Columbia after McMaster in 1911. McMaster School operated until South Carolina reorganized its school system in 1956. The building has been part of the University of South Carolina's campus since 1960 and how houses the School of Visual Art and Design.

South Carolina’s current governor, Henry McMaster, is a descendant of Fitz William McMaster.
