= Bob Coble =

American politician

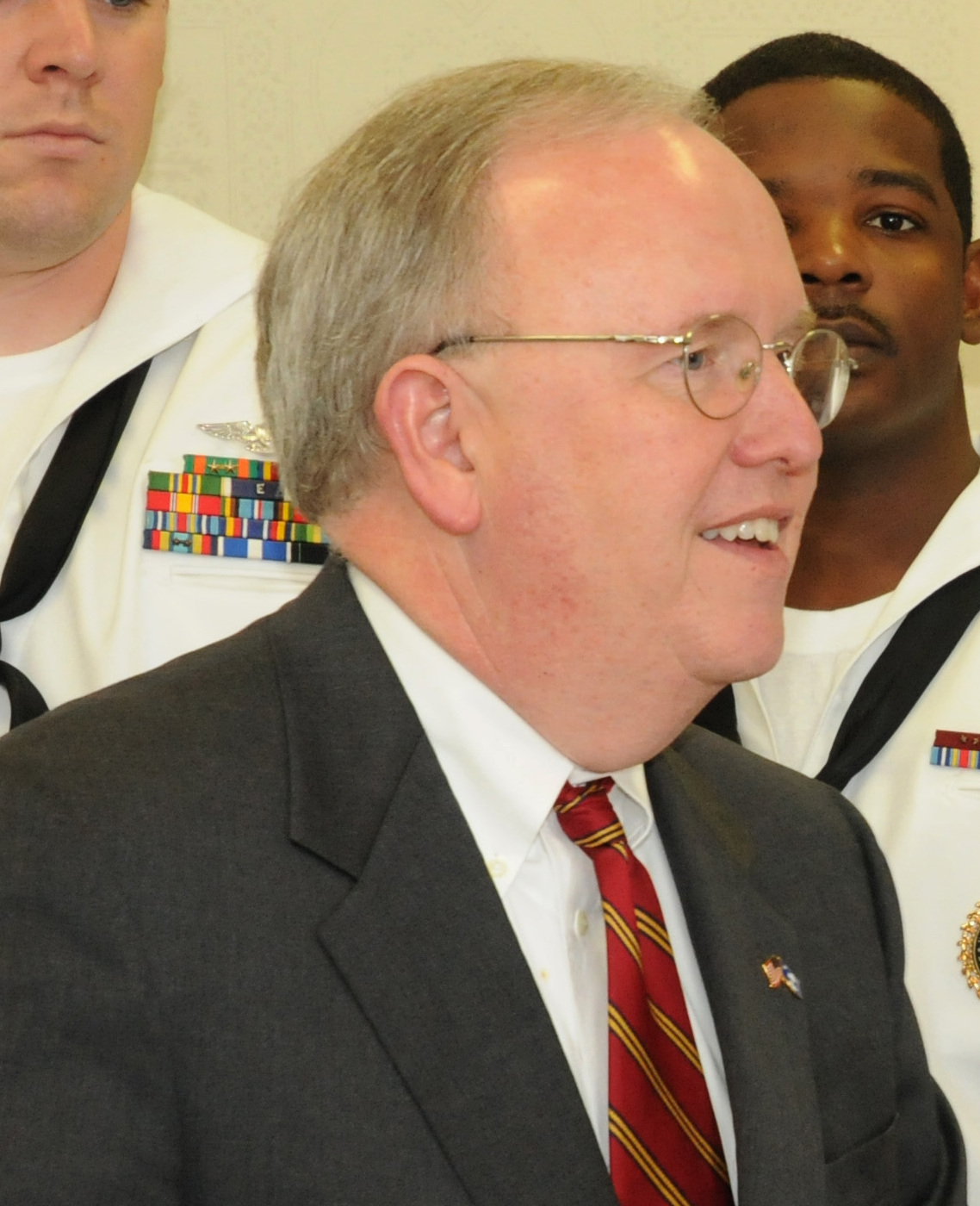
- Coble in 2008

69th Mayor of Columbia, South Carolina
- In office 1990–2010
- Preceded by: T. Patton Adams
- Succeeded by: Stephen K. Benjamin

Personal details
- Party: Democratic

Robert D. "Bob" Coble (born April 27, 1953) is an attorney, and served as the 69th mayor of Columbia, South Carolina.

== Early life and education ==
Coble, a resident of Columbia, graduated from Dreher High School in 1971 where he was student body president.

Coble graduated from the University of South Carolina in 1975 cum laude and the University of South Carolina School of Law in 1978 cum laude.

== Political career ==
=== Mayor of Columbia ===
Coble was elected Mayor of Columbia South Carolina in 1990 and served until 2010. He was elected Mayor five times and in his last re-election in 2006 received 64% of the citywide vote.

In 1994 Coble and Columbia business leaders brought a lawsuit to remove the Confederate Flag from the Dome of the South Carolina State House.

=== Richland County Council ===
Coble was elected to the Richland County Council in 1985 and served until 1988.

=== Post-mayoral activities ===
Coble is an attorney with the Maynard Nexsen Law Firm in Columbia where he chairs the firm's South Carolina Public Policy and Government Affairs Group.

Coble is the Chair of the Columbia World Affairs Council and serves on the South Carolina Advisory Committee of the U.S. Global Leadership Coalition.

== Personal life ==
Coble married Beth McLeod, the daughter of former South Carolina Attorney General Daniel R. McLeod in 1978. They are the parents of six children and fifteen grandchildren. Coble's son, Daniel Coble, was elected in February 2022 by the South Carolina Legislature as a State Circuit Court Judge.

On April 15, 2015, Coble had a heart attack in the South Carolina Statehouse while working there as a lobbyist and lawyer, but made a full recovery by August.

== Honors and recognitions ==
Coble's honors and recognitions include:

- Global Vision Award, World Affairs Council, 2008
- The Richland One School District Hall of Fame, 2007
- Order of the Palmetto, Governor Mark Sanford, June 2010.

At his retirement Columbia City Council named the portion of the Three Rivers Greenway behind EdVenture Children's Museum, Coble Plaza in his honor. Coble Plaza was dedicated and opened on July 3, 2013.
