= Mayor of Columbia, South Carolina =

Mayor of Columbia
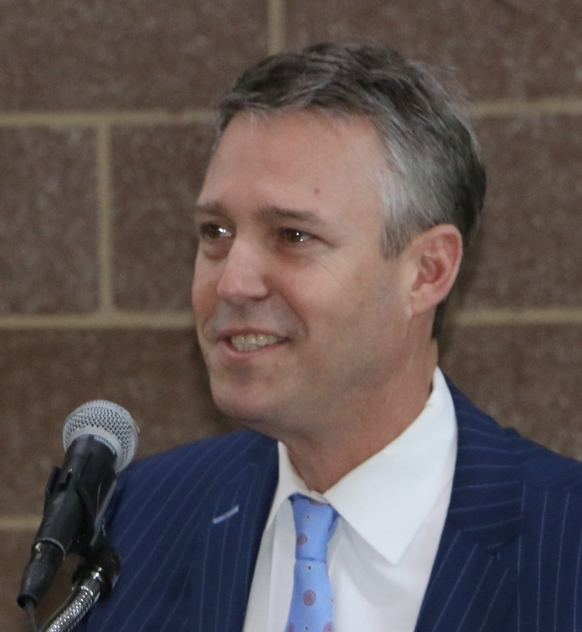
- Incumbent; Daniel Rickenmann since January 4, 2022
- Style: His Honor
- Term length: Four years
- Inaugural holder: John Taylor
- Formation: 19th century

The mayor of Columbia, South Carolina is elected at large for a four-year term. The duties of the mayor is to create policy and enact laws, rules and regulations for the city of Columbia. Daniel Rickenmann, who assumed office on January 4, 2022 is the current mayor of Columbia.

== Intendants and mayors of Columbia, South Carolina ==
No.	Term	Image	Mayor	Intendant
1		May 1806–April 1807		John Taylor
2		April 1807–June 1807		Abraham Nott
3		June 1807–April 1808		Claiborne Clifton
4		April 1808–July 1808		John Hooker
5		July 1808–April 1809		Daniel Faust
6		1809		Simon Taylor
7		1810		Robert Stark
8		1811		Simon Taylor
9		1812–1815		Daniel Faust
10		1815		William E. Hayne
11		1816		James Gregg
12		1817		Daniel Morgan
13		1818–1822		James Taylor Goodwyn
14		1822		David James McCord
15		1823		James Taylor Goodwyn
16		1824		David James McCord
17		1825		James Taylor Goodwyn
18		1826–1828		William Ford de Saussure
19		1828–1830		Ezekiel Hopkins Maxcy
20		1830		William Campbell Preston
21		1831		William C. Clifton
22		1832		Ezekiel Hopkins Maxcy
23		1833–1836		Dr. M. H. DeLeon
24		1836–1839		John Bryce
25		1839–1841		Dr. Robert Wilson Gibbes
26		April 1841–September 1841		Col. Benjamin T. Elmore
27		September 1841–April 1842		Col. Robert Howell Goodwyn
28		1842–1845		William Mills Myers
29		1845–December 1846		William Byrd Stanley
30		December 1846–April 1847		Joel Stevenson
31		1847–1850		Edward Sill
32		1850–1851		Henry Lyons
33		1851–1853		Col. Adley Hogan Gladden
34		1853–1855		William Maybin
35		1855–1857	Edward J. Arthur	
36		1857–1859	James D. Tradewell	
37		1859–1861	Allen J. Green	
38		1861–1863	John Henry Boatwright	
39		1863–1865	Thomas Jefferson Goodwyn	
40		May 1865–April 1866	James Guignard Gibbes	
41		April 1866–July 1868	Theodore Stark	
42		July 1868–August 1868	Col. Francis Luther Guenther	
43		August 1868–November 1868	Cyrus H. Baldwin	
44		November 1868 – 1870	John McKenzie	
45		1870–1878	John Alexander	
46		1878–1880	Capt. William B. Stanley	
47		1880–1882	Capt. Richard O'Neale Jr.	
48		1882–1890	John Taylor Rhett	
49		1890–1892	Col. Fitz William McMaster	
50		1892–1894	Dr. Walter Coles Fisher	
51		1894–1898	William McBurney Sloan	
52		1898–1900	Col. Thomas J. Lipscomb	
53		1900–1904	Dr. Fort Sumter Earle	
54		1904–1908	Thomas Hasell Gibbes	
55		1908–1910	William S. Reamer	
56		1910–1914	Wade Hampton Gibbes, Jr.	
57		1914–1918	Dr. Lewie A. Griffith	
58		1918–1922	R. Johnson Blalock	
59		1922–1926	William A. Coleman	
60		1926–1941	Dr. Lawrence Beacham Owens	
61		1941–1946	Fred D. Marshall	
62		1946–1950	Dr. Frank C. Owens	
63		1950–1954	J. Macfie Anderson	
64		1954–1958	J. Clarence Dreher	
65		1958–1970	Lester L. Bates	
66		1970–1978	John T. Campbell	
67		1978–1986	Kirkman Finlay Jr.	
68		1986–1990	T. Patton Adams	
69		1990–2010	Robert D. "Bob" Coble	
70		2010–2022	Stephen K. Benjamin	
71		2022–present	Daniel Rickenmann	

== See also ==
- Timeline of Columbia, South Carolina
