= Kirkman Finlay Jr. =

American lawyer and politician

67th Mayor of Columbia, South Carolina
- In office 1978–1986
- Preceded by: John T. Campbell
- Succeeded by: T. Patton Adams

Personal details
- Born: August 16, 1936 Columbia, South Carolina
- Died: June 27, 1993 (aged 56) Columbia, South Carolina
- Party: Democratic; Republican (until 1977)
- Spouse: Mary Fleming
- Children: 2, including Kirkman III
- Education: University of the South (BA); Harvard University (JD)

Kirkman "Kirk" Finlay Jr. (August 16, 1936 – June 27, 1993) was an American lawyer and politician who served on the Columbia, South Carolina city council from 1974 to 1978 and as that city's mayor from 1978 to 1986. He died of brain cancer in 1993 at the age of 56.

His son, Kirkman Finlay III, followed in his footsteps and was elected to Columbia city council before running successfully for a seat in the South Carolina House of Representatives.
