= Stephen K. Benjamin =

American politician (born 1969)

Steve Benjamin
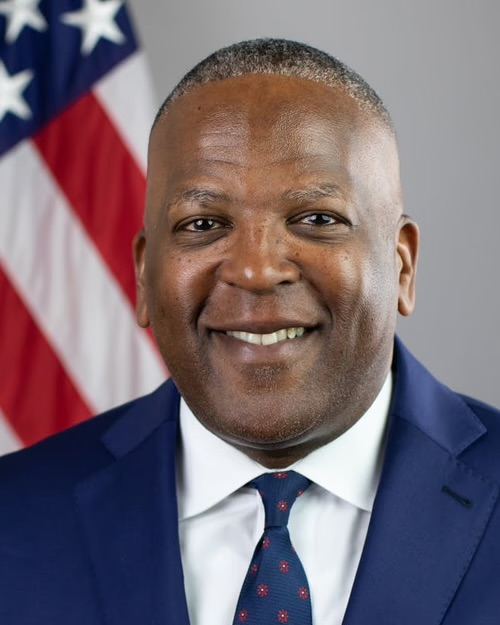
- Official portrait, 2023

Senior Advisor to the President for Public Engagement
- In office April 1, 2023 – January 20, 2025
- President: Joe Biden
- Preceded by: Keisha Lance Bottoms
- Succeeded by: Jim Goyer (as Director of the Office of Public Liaison)

Director of the Office of Public Engagement
- In office April 1, 2023 – January 20, 2025
- President: Joe Biden
- Principal Deputy: Jamie Citron
- Preceded by: Keisha Lance Bottoms
- Succeeded by: Jim Goyer

70th Mayor of Columbia
- In office July 1, 2010 – January 4, 2022
- Preceded by: Bob Coble
- Succeeded by: Daniel Rickenmann

76th President of the United States Conference of Mayors
- In office May 7, 2018 – July 1, 2019
- Preceded by: Mitch Landrieu
- Succeeded by: Bryan Barnett

Director of the South Carolina Department of Probation, Parole, and Pardon Services
- In office January 13, 1999 – January 15, 2003
- Governor: Jim Hodges
- Preceded by: Stephen Bernie
- Succeeded by: Joan Meacham

Personal details
- Born: Stephen Keith Benjamin; December 1, 1969 (age 56) New York City, U.S.
- Party: Democratic
- Spouse: DeAndrea Gist
- Education: University of South Carolina (BA, JD)

Stephen Keith Benjamin (born December 1, 1969) is an American politician and lawyer who served as the Senior Advisor to the President and Director of the White House Office of Public Engagement under President Joe Biden from 2023 to 2025. Benjamin previously served as Mayor of Columbia, South Carolina from 2010 to 2022, becoming the city’s first African American mayor. He has also held leadership roles in several national organizations, including serving as President of both the U.S. Conference of Mayors and the African American Mayors Association.

== Early life, education, and early career ==
Benjamin's parents were from Orangeburg, South Carolina, but relocated to Queens, New York, during the Great Migration in the 1960s. Benjamin later moved to Columbia to attend the University of South Carolina, where he earned a bachelor’s degree in political science in 1991 and a Juris Doctor from the University of South Carolina School of Law in 1994. While at the university, Benjamin served as President of Student Government, President of the student chapter of the NAACP, and later as President of the Student Bar Association.

Benjamin began his public service career as a member of South Carolina Governor Jim Hodges' Cabinet, where he served as chief executive of a $43 million state agency employing 950 people. Benjamin also completed executive coursework through the Bloomberg Harvard City Leadership Initiative, participated in additional leadership programs, and was named both an Aspen Institute Rodel Fellow and a Liberty Fellow.

=== Academic roles ===
In addition to his public service, Benjamin has remained active in academia. He has served as an Adjunct Professor at the University of South Carolina Honors College and was the Spring 2022 Richard L. and Ronay A. Menschel Senior Leadership Fellow at the Harvard University T.H. Chan School of Public Health. He also holds an honorary Doctor of Humanities from Francis Marion University.

== Political career ==
In 1999, Benjamin was appointed by Democratic Governor Jim Hodges to serve as Director of the South Carolina Department of Probation, Parole, and Pardon Services, a position he held until 2003. In 2002, Benjamin ran as the Democratic nominee for Attorney General of South Carolina, but was defeated by Republican Henry McMaster, losing by a margin of 11 percent.

During the 2000 presidential election, Benjamin served as a South Carolina state co-chair of GoreNet, a grassroots organization that supported Al Gore's campaign. GoreNet focused on online organizing, grassroots mobilization, and hosting small-dollar donor events.

=== Mayor of Columbia (2010–2022) ===
In 2010, Benjamin won a special election to become mayor of Columbia, defeating Kirkman Finlay III in a runoff to succeed Bob Coble. In November 2017, Benjamin was the only candidate to file for the mayoral election and therefore did not appear on the ballot; he was automatically declared re-elected without any votes. On February 4, 2021, Benjamin announced that he would not seek re-election later that year.

His tenure focused on economic development, infrastructure investment, public safety, and inclusive governance. Under his leadership, Columbia experienced:

- Nearly $2 billion in downtown capital investment
- Over $750 million invested in water, sewer, and stormwater infrastructure
- Consistent budget surpluses in 9 of 12 years
- Property tax cuts of more than 12 mills
- Restoration of the city’s reserve fund post-2008 crisis
- The first LEED Gold-certified municipal building in the city
- The nation’s first stand-alone stormwater green bonds certified by the Climate Bond Initiative

His administration also led Columbia to become the first U.S. city to ban bump stocks and trigger cranks, implemented the Justice for All initiative focused on 21st-century policing, and prioritized the city’s arts and culture through major investments and the appointment of a city Poet Laur.

Columbia received multiple accolades during his administration, including recognition by National Geographic;, SmartAsset, and The Washington Post as a top destination for millennials and diverse populations.

=== National leadership ===
Benjamin served as:

- President of the U.S. Conference of Mayors
- President of the African American Mayors Association
- Vice Chairman of the Global Parliament of Mayors
- Executive Chairman of Municipal Bonds for America
- Co-Chair of the Sierra Club's Mayors for 100% Clean Energy
- Chair-Elect of the Greater Columbia Chamber of Commerce

He also founded two major national initiatives:

- The Mayors Leadership Institute on Smart Cities at the Wagner Graduate School of Public Service, providing mayors with best practices and strategies to implement "smart city" solutions
- The Mayors and Business Leaders Center for Inclusive and Compassionate Cities, promoting equity and compassion in city governance

Benjamin received numerous honors during and after his tenure, including the U.S. SBA Phoenix Award (2017) for his leadership during the 2015 floods and the 2018 USGLC Leading Globally Matters Locally Award. Benjamin currently serves as a Senior Advisor to Civint.

=== White House role (2023–2024) ===
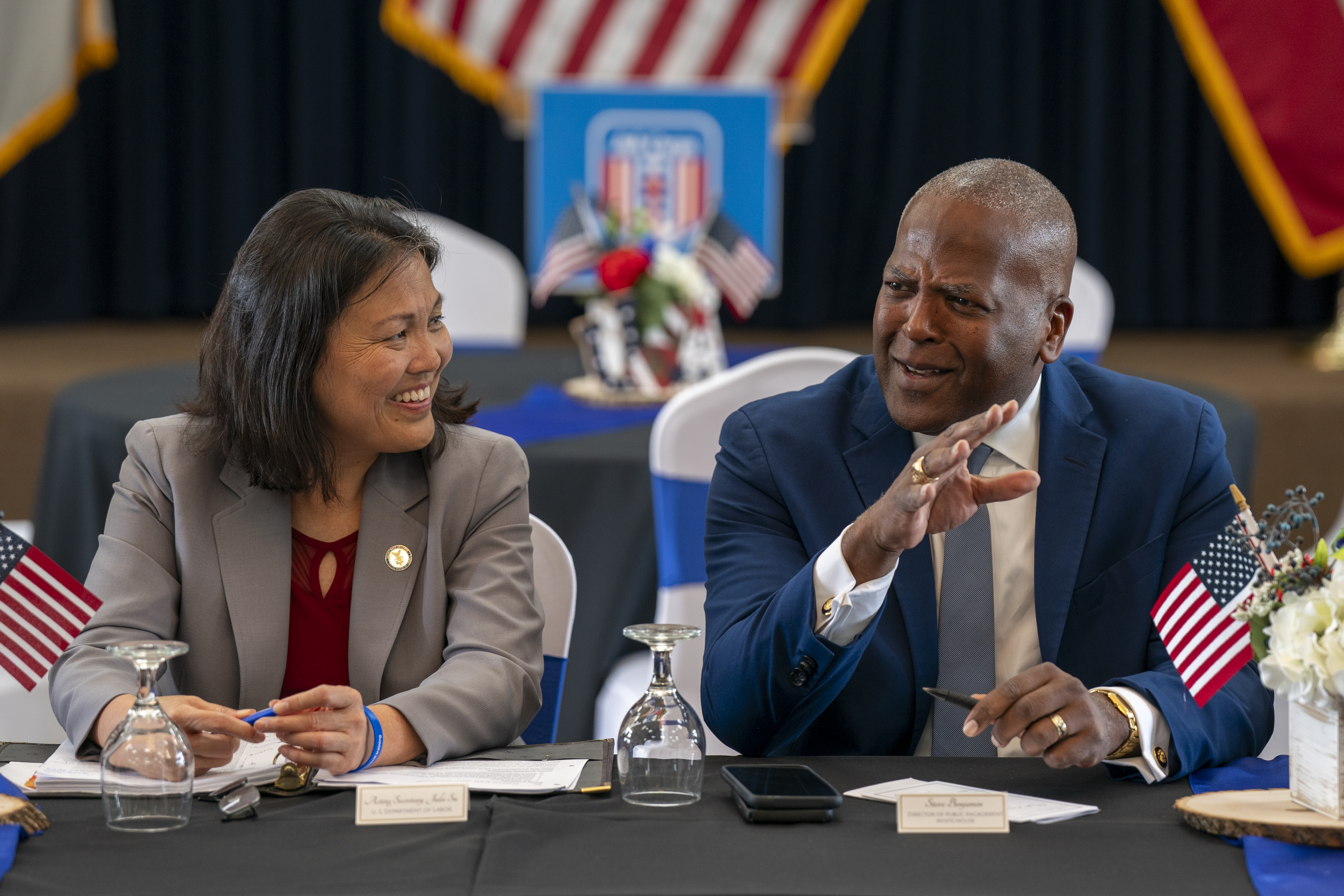
Benjamin with Acting Secretary of Labor Julie Su in 2024

In 2023, President Joe Biden appointed Benjamin as Senior Advisor to the President and Director of the White House Office of Public Engagement, where he coordinated communication and outreach between the executive branch and a broad spectrum of stakeholders, including business, labor, civil rights organizations, and the general public.

== Other professional activities ==
Benjamin has served in various public-private roles and on multiple boards:

- Chairman, FirstNet Authority Board (overseeing broadband communication for public safety agencies)
- Chairman, FLEX (a coalition supporting app-based workers and technology-driven job platforms)
- Co-Chair, BGR Group Advisory Board and U.S. Global Leadership Coalition
- Board Member, The National Judicial College and Benedict College
- Senior Fellow, Center for Financial Markets at the Milken Institute

He is also an experienced corporate director, having served on boards of both public and private companies in financial services, biopharma, risk management, and healthcare.

== Endorsements ==
Benjamin endorsed Democrat Billy Webster in the 2026 South Carolina gubernatorial election.

== Personal life ==
Benjamin is married to DeAndrea G. Benjamin, a judge on the United States Court of Appeals for the Fourth Circuit. They have two daughters.

He is a member of Kappa Alpha Psi and Sigma Pi Phi fraternities.

== Electoral history ==
Mayor of Columbia, 2017
Candidate	Votes	%
Steve Benjamin	0	

- Benjamin was the only candidate to file; he was automatically declared re-elected with no votes.

Mayor of Columbia, 2013
Candidate	Votes	%
Steve Benjamin	10,401	64.1
Moe Baddourah	5,594	34.4
Other	224	1.5

Mayor of Columbia, 2010 (Special Runoff)
Candidate	Votes	%
Steve Benjamin	10,894	55.2
Kirkman Finlay III	8,845	44.8

Mayor of Columbia, 2010 (Special)
Candidate	Votes	%
Steve Benjamin	6,067	35.5
Kirkman Finlay III	5,485	32.1
Steve Morrison	5,053	29.5
Other	472	2.9

South Carolina Attorney General Election, 2002
Party	Candidate	Votes	%
Republican	Henry McMaster	601,931	55.48
Democratic	Steve Benjamin	482,560	44.48
Write-ins	Write-ins	498	0.05

== Recognition and awards ==
- The Root's 100 Influential Black Americans (2011 & 2013)
- The Phoenix Award for Outstanding Contributions to Disaster Recovery by a Public Official (2017)
- Stephen K. Benjamin Leadership and Service Center, University of South Carolina.

== See also ==
- List of first African-American mayors

Party political offices
Preceded by Tom Turnipseed	Democratic nominee for Attorney General of South Carolina; 2002	Vacant Title next held by Matthew Richardson
Political offices
Preceded by Bob Coble	Mayor of Columbia; 2010–2022	Succeeded by Daniel Rickenmann
Preceded by Keisha Lance Bottoms	Director of the Office of Public Engagement; 2023–2025	Succeeded by Jim Goyer
