= Finlay Park =

Municipal park in Columbia, South Carolina, U.S.

Coordinates: 34°00′27″N 81°02′31″W

- Interactive map of Finlay Park
- Location: Columbia, South Carolina
- Area: 57,000 m^{2} (610,000 sq ft)
- Opened: 1991

Finlay Park, is 14 acres (57,000 m^{2}) urban park in downtown Columbia, South Carolina. It is the city's largest and most visited park. Originally named Sidney Park, it was renamed in 1994 after former Columbia mayor Kirkman Finlay.

The park features a scenic waterfall and a cascading, mountain-style stream that flows into the park’s lake. However, the waterfall has been out of operation for nearly two years. The park includes picnic tables, two playground areas, and a café, making it a popular destination for families in the past. In recent years, however, it has become home to the city's largest homeless population. Ongoing issues at the park have led local charity organizations to provide weekly food services for those living on the park’s benches.

Despite these challenges, the park continues to host outdoor movies on Friday nights during the summer months. It is also the venue for numerous events and festivals, including the Sizzlin' Summer Concert Series. This free outdoor concert series runs for 13 weeks, starting on May 24, with performances from 7 to 10 p.m. The lineup features a variety of music genres, including blues, beach, classical, contemporary/top 40, country, bluegrass, and reggae. Admission is free, and visitors are encouraged to bring picnics; however, glass containers, grills, pets, and radios are not permitted.

== Events ==
In the fall of 2000, WARQ (then an alternative station) hosted its third annual Fallout concert at Finlay Park. The lineup in 2000 was Everclear, Fuel, Eve 6, SR-71, and rap rock group 2 Skinnee J's. In 2001, WARQ hosted Fallout again with Incubus and Seven Mary Three. In 2002, Fallout had Our Lady Peace and Jimmy Eat World. In 2003, the final Fallout concert had Three Days Grace, Default, and Smile Empty Soul. On April 22, 1996, Finlay Park had a free concert by Columbia's Hootie & the Blowfish (who were at the peak of their fame and promoting Fairweather Johnson, which was released the next day and went to #1). In spring 2012, the park hosted Marshall Tucker Band. In fall '09, it hosted Holypalooza with Christian rock bands The Almost and Sent by Ravens. In fall 2007, it hosted hard rock band Flyleaf. In 1997 it hosted Eddie Money, and in 1995 it hosted Southern rock band 38 Special. In August 2012, Finlay Park was the setting for the 3-day Famously Hot Music Festival, which for the rock bands had Collective Soul, Buckcherry, Filter, Eve 6, and Seven Mary Three.

== Renovation ==
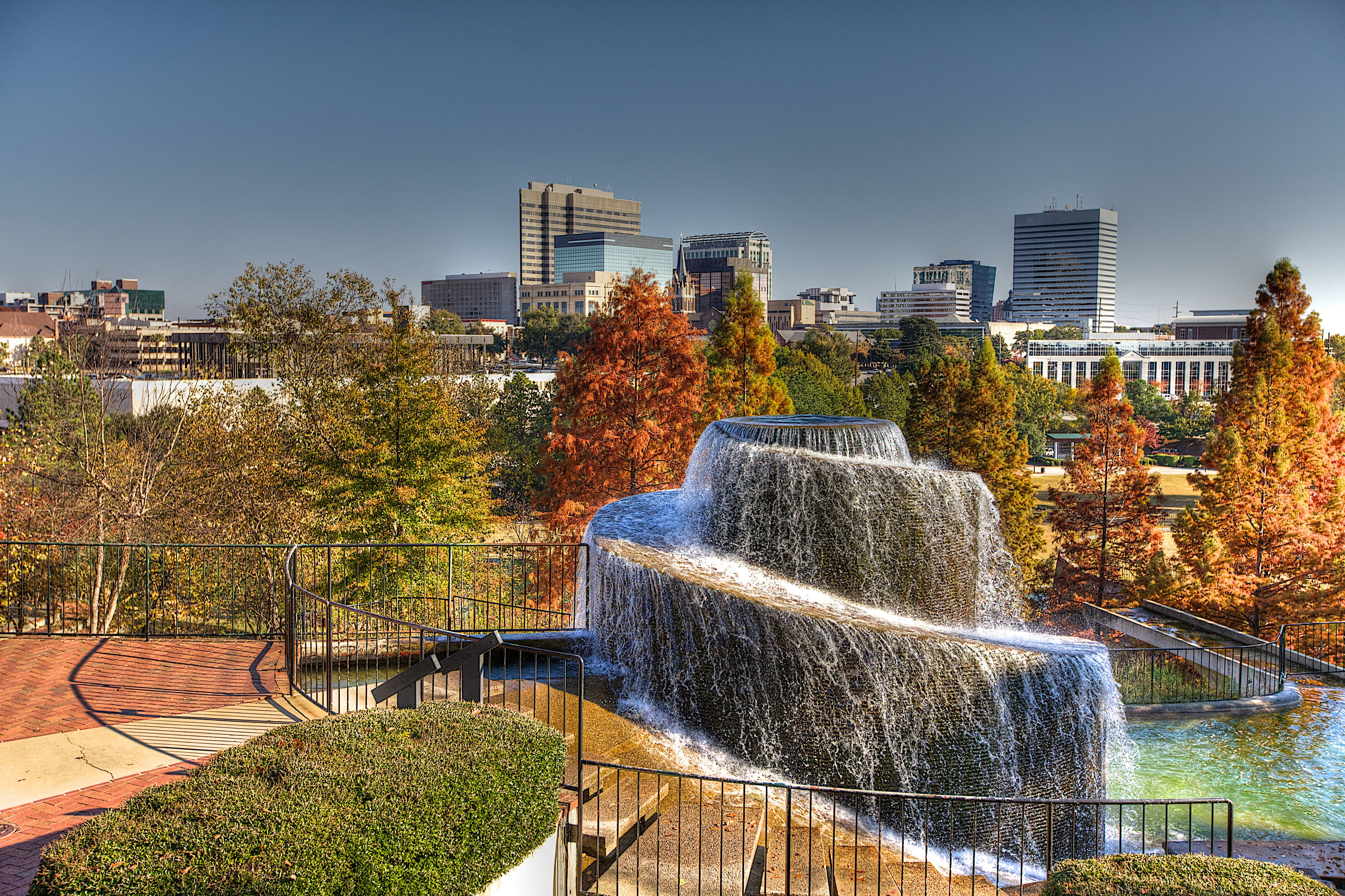
Finlay Park

In 2023, the city broke ground on a $24 million redesign of the park scheduled to include a rebuilt central fountain, a new band stage, public art, enhanced lawn areas, and new amenities such as strolling gardens and an overlook plaza. The park reopened on November 15, 2025.
