= South Carolina Highway 16 =

Highway in South Carolina

South Carolina Highway 16

Route information
- Maintained by SCDOT
- Length: 9.550 mi (15.369 km)
- Existed: 1964–present

Major junctions
- South end: SC 48 in Columbia
- US 76 / US 378 in Columbia; SC 12 in Forest Acres; US 1 in Columbia; SC 555 in Columbia; SC 277 in Columbia; US 21 / US 321 in Columbia
- North end: US 176 in Columbia

Location
- Country: United States
- State: South Carolina
- Counties: Richland

Highway system
- South Carolina State Highway System; Interstate; US; State; Scenic
← US 15	→ US 17

South Carolina Highway 16 (SC 16) is a 9.6-mile-long (15.4 km) primary state highway in the U.S. state of South Carolina that exists mostly within Columbia in Richland County. Its routing is in a backward C-shape.

== Route description ==
SC 16 begins at an intersection with SC 48, just south of the University of South Carolina. Going in a counterclockwise direction, it goes east to U.S. Routes 76 and 378 (US 76/US 378) at Devine Street, then north intersecting SC 12 (Forest Drive) within the small portion of Forest Acres through which SC 16 travels, and US 1 (Two Notch Road). Heading now west, it intersects SC 555 (Farrow Road) before splitting into one-way streets: northbound along Marshall Street and southbound along Sunset Drive and Academy Street. SC 16 recombines onto Sunset Drive at the SC 277 (Northeastern Freeway) northbound on-ramps, flanked by the Palmetto Health Richland. Continuing east, SC 16 ends at US 176 (River Drive), approximately one mile (1.6 km) east of the Broad River.

Shaped as a backward C, it travels along the following street names: Rosewood Drive, Beltline Boulevard, Marshall Street/Academy Street, and Sunset Drive. Signage along the entire route is poorly marked with few signs indicating it is SC 16 and several major intersections not clearly marked.

== History ==
Established in 1964, it existed twice as two unrelated highways before in 1927-1931 and 1939-1948. The first SC 16 was an original state route from SC 2 (today US 176) in Columbia, north into North Carolina, continuing as NC 16; it connected the cities and towns of Ridgeway, Winnsboro, Chester, York, and Clover. In 1927, US 21 was assigned between Columbia and Chester; the following year SC 16 was removed from that section. In 1931, the first SC 16 was decommissioned when US 321 was assigned on the remaining route.

The second SC 16 appeared in 1939 as a new primary routing between SC 48 east to US 76 in Columbia. In 1940, it was extended north from US 76 to SC 12. In 1948, the second SC 16 was decommissioned, downgraded to secondary roads.

The third and current SC 16 eventually resurrects part of its previous route. Reappearing in 1964, as a new primary routing, it traversed from its current northern terminus at US 176 east to US 76/US 378/SC 760. In 1982, SC 16 was extended west to its current southern terminus at SC 48; this left behind Cross Hill Road and its connection to SC 760.

== Junction list ==
The entire route is in Richland County.

Location	mi	km	Destinations	Notes
Columbia	0.000	0.000	SC 48 (Assembly Street) – Eastover	Southern terminus
Columbia	2.370	3.814	Rosewood Drive east (US 76 Conn. east) / South Beltline Boulevard south – Sumter, Fort Jackson	Western terminus of eastern segment of US 76 Conn., which takes on the Rosewood Drive name; SC 16 turns left off of Rosewood Drive and onto North Beltline Boulevard.
Columbia	2.780	4.474	US 76 / US 378 (Devine Street)	
Columbia	3.170	5.102	Cross Hill Road south (US 76 Conn. east) – Sumter	Western terminus of central segment of US 76 Conn.; northern terminus of Cross Hill Road (SC-16 Conn)
Forest Acres	4.890	7.870	SC 12 (Forest Drive) – Forest Acres	
Columbia	6.400	10.300	US 1 (Two Notch Road) – Camden	
Columbia	6.500	10.461	US 1 Conn. east	Western terminus of US 1 Conn.
Columbia	7.640	12.295	SC 555 (Farrow Road)	
Columbia	8.280– 8.320	13.325– 13.390	SC 277 north (Northeastern Freeway) to I-20 / I-77	No access to southbound SC 277
Columbia	8.740	14.066	US 21 / US 321 (Main Street)	
Columbia	9.550	15.369	US 176 (River Drive) – Irmo	Northern terminus
1.000 mi = 1.609 km; 1.000 km = 0.621 mi: Incomplete access
