= South Carolina Highway 277 =

State highway in South Carolina, United States

South Carolina Highway 277

Route information
- Maintained by SCDOT
- Length: 8.140 mi (13.100 km)
- Existed: 1976–present

Major junctions
- South end: US 76 in Columbia
- I-20 in Dentsville
- North end: I-77 near Dentsville

Location
- Country: United States
- State: South Carolina
- Counties: Richland

Highway system
- South Carolina State Highway System; Interstate; US; State; Scenic
← US 276	→ US 278

South Carolina Highway 277 (SC 277) is a 8.140-mile (13.100 km) state highway in the U.S. state of South Carolina. It travels from U.S. Route 76 (US 76) in downtown Columbia to Interstate 77 (I-77; at its exit 18) in Dentsville in Richland County. For most of its length, it is a controlled-access highway conforming to interstate standards. The highway serves as a spur into Columbia from its northeastern suburbs and from intercity traffic traveling from I-77 and I-20. The freeway portion of SC 277 is called the Northeastern Freeway or I. DeQuincey Newman Freeway while the 0.7 miles (1.1 km) of surface street is part of Bull Street.

== Route description ==
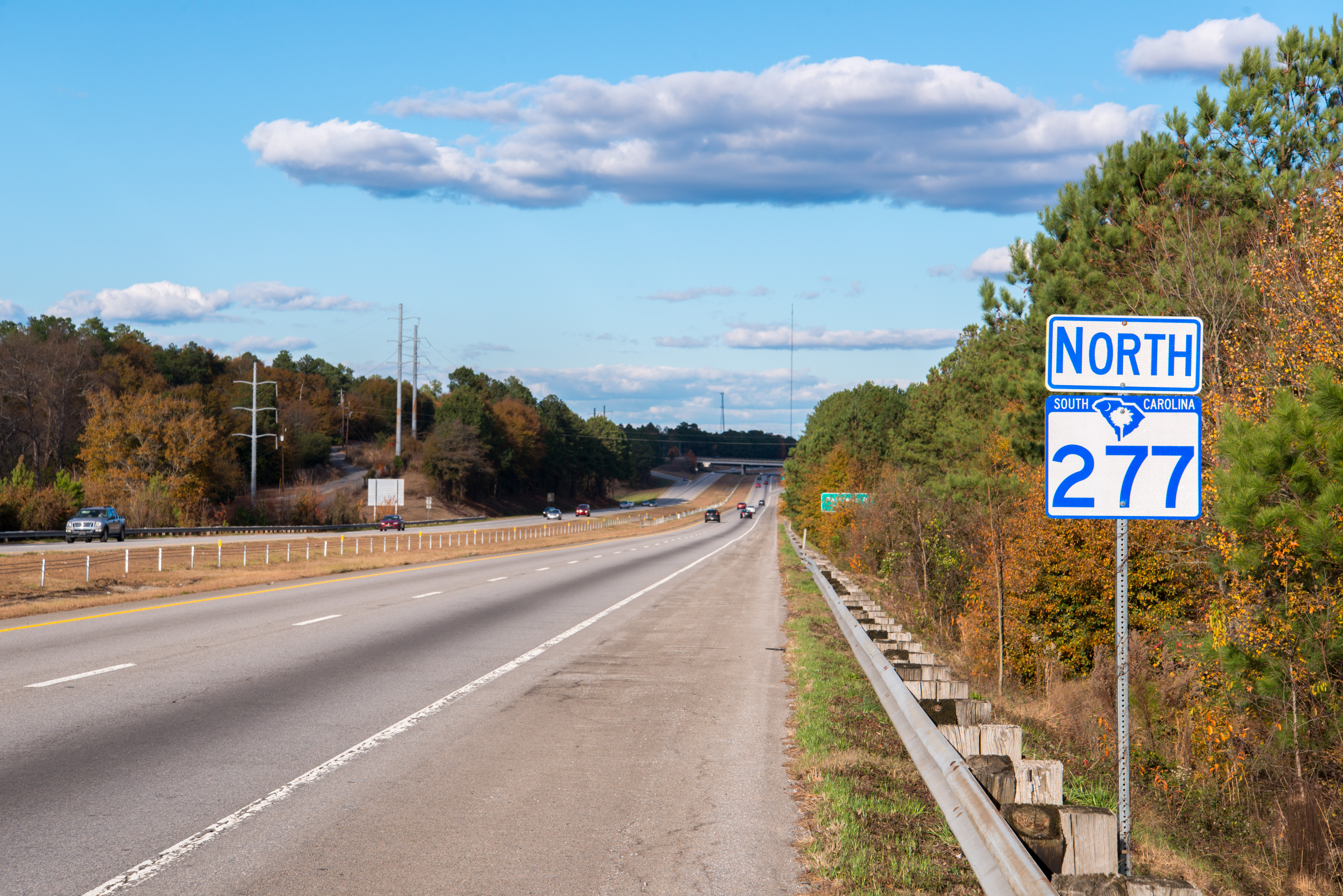
Northbound SC 277

SC 277 begins at the intersection of Elmwood Avenue and Bull Street in downtown Columbia. From this point, US 76 heads south along Bull Street and west along Elmwood Avenue. SC 277 heads north on a six-lane surface divided highway passing a residential neighborhood to the west and state office buildings to the east. After about 2/3 mile (1.1 km) at Harden Street Extension, the freeway begins and the number of lanes in each direction reduces to two. The freeway passes over SC 16 with a partial interchange allowing an entrance and exit from the north. It curves to the northeast cutting through a residential neighborhood and reaches a diamond interchange with SC 555. After passing over two separate railroad lines, SC 277 has an interchange with Fontaine Road. At this point, the freeway exits the city of Columbia and enters the census designated place of Dentsville. SC 277 interchanges with I-20 but with two movements towards the east not provided (the two connections are provided via I-77). The freeway enters a more wooded area and has an interchange with Parklane Road. Shortly thereafter, SC 277 reaches its end at I-77. Additional connections with I-77's exit 19 (for SC 555) are also provided within this interchange.

== History ==
SC 277 was originally part of a plan to construct an urban-loop expressway through Columbia shortly following federal approval of extending I-77 to the city from Charlotte in 1969. The initial phase of the highway was logically conceived as an alternative to increasingly congested Farrow Road (SC 555). The highway split from I-77 at what is now exit 19, proceeding through downtown Columbia roughly parallel to Farrow Rd. and Huger Street, finally merging with I-26 near the present-day terminus of I-77 in Cayce. New parallel spans over the Congaree River, as well as a direct connection to I-126 at an improved Huger St. interchange were part of the original plan. Construction began at I-20 in 1973, opening in stages from the planned Bull Street interchange northward to I-77 through the end of 1977.

== Exit list ==
The entire route is in Richland County. All exits are unnumbered.

Location	mi	km	Destinations	Notes
Columbia	0.000	0.000	US 76 (Elmwood Avenue / Bull Street) to I-26 – State Museum, University of South Carolina, EdVenture, Riverbanks Zoo	
Columbia	Southern end of freeway			
Columbia	1.120– 1.164	1.802– 1.873	SC 16 (Sunset Drive / Beltline Boulevard)	Southbound exit / northbound entrance only
Columbia	1.930	3.106	SC 555 (Farrow Road)	
Dentsville	4.268– 4.290	6.869– 6.904	Fontaine Road	
Dentsville	6.037– 6.230	9.716– 10.026	I-20 – Florence, Augusta	No access from I-20 west to SC 277 north or from SC 277 south to I-20 east; I-20 exit 73; former southern end of I-77 Temp. concurrency
Dentsville	7.220	11.619	Parklane Road – Dentsville	
Dentsville	7.531– 8.140	12.120– 13.100	I-77 north / SC 555 (Farrow Road) – Charlotte	No access to I-77 south or from I-77 north; I-77 exit 18; former northern end of I-77 Temp. concurrency; former northern terminus of I-77 Temp.
1.000 mi = 1.609 km; 1.000 km = 0.621 mi: Incomplete access
