= U.S. Route 378 =

U.S. Highway in Georgia and South Carolina

U.S. Route 378
- US 378 highlighted in red

Route information
- Auxiliary route of US 78
- Length: 234.14 mi (376.81 km)
- Existed: September 1951–present

Major junctions
- West end: US 78 / SR 10 / SR 17 / SR 47 in Washington, GA
- US 178 in Saluda, SC; US 1 twice in South Carolina; I-20 near West Columbia, SC; I-26 in West Columbia, SC; US 21 / US 176 / US 321 in Columbia, SC; US 76 in Columbia, SC; I-77 in Columbia, SC; US 15 / US 401 / US 521 in Sumter, SC; I-95 near Turbeville, SC; US 52 near Lake City, SC
- East end: US 501 Bus. in Conway, SC

Location
- Country: United States
- States: Georgia, South Carolina
- Counties: GA: Wilkes, Lincoln; SC: McCormick, Edgefield, Saluda, Lexington, Richland, Sumter, Clarendon, Florence, Marion, Horry

Highway system
- United States Numbered Highway System; List; Special; Divided
← SR 377	GA	→ SR 378
← SC 377	SC	→ SC 381

U.S. Route 378 (US 378) is a spur of US 78 in the U.S. states of Georgia and South Carolina. The U.S. Highway runs 234.14 miles (376.81 km) from US 78, Georgia State Route 10 (SR 10), SR 17, and SR 47 in Washington, Georgia, east to US 501 Business in Conway, South Carolina. US 378 connects the Central Savannah River Area in both states with the Midlands and Pee Dee regions of South Carolina. The U.S. Highway's western portion, which connects Washington and Lincolnton in Georgia and McCormick, Saluda, and Lexington in South Carolina, is mainly a rural highway. US 378 is a major suburban and urban highway through Lexington and South Carolina's state capital, Columbia. The highway has a lengthy concurrency with US 76 between Columbia and Sumter and serves as a major route between the Midlands and the Myrtle Beach area, between which the highway has a business route through Lake City.

== Route description ==
Lengths
	mi	km
GA	23.25	37.42
SC	210.89	339.39
Total	234.14	376.81

US 378 has a length of 23.25 miles (37.42 km) in Georgia and spans 210.89 miles (339.39 km) in South Carolina. The U.S. Highway is a part of the National Highway System from US 178 in Saluda east to US 501 and US 701 in Conway.

=== Georgia ===
US 378 begins at an intersection on the eastern edge of the city of Washington with US 78, SR 10, and SR 17, which form the north–south axis of the junction, and US 78 Business, SR 47, SR 10 Business, and SR 17 Business, which heads west on Robert Toombs Avenue toward downtown Washington. US 378 and SR 47 head east on Lincolnton Road, also known as Joe Wheeler Highway, which starts as a four-lane divided highway but becomes two lanes a short distance east of the intersection. Shortly after the Wilkes–Lincoln county line, the highways, now part of Washington Highway, meet the western end of SR 220, a C-shaped route through southern Lincoln County. US 378 and SR 47 gradually curve north and enter the city of Lincolnton as Washington Street. SR 47 splits east from the U.S. Highway and SR 43 begins to run concurrently with US 378 at their intersection with Elm Street. The highways pass along the west side of downtown Lincolnton and curve northeast, meeting the southern end of SR 79 (Goshen Street) before leaving the city.

US 378 and SR 43 continue northeast on McCormick Highway, which meets the northern end of SR 43 Connector (Old Petersburg Road) a short distance east of the city limits at Wright's Crossing. The highways cross the Soap Creek branch of the Savannah River reservoir known as Clarks Hill Lake in Georgia and Lake Strom Thurmond in South Carolina.

=== South Carolina ===
==== State line to Saluda ====
US 378 and SR 43 meet the eastern end of SR 220 just west of Elijah Clark State Park. SR 43 reaches its northern terminus at the state line at the thalweg of the Savannah River in the center of the lake crossing. US 378 enters Sumter National Forest and crosses the Little River branch of the lake, on the east side of which is Baker Creek State Park. The highway continues to the town of McCormick, through which the highway follows Gold Street. US 378 intersects SC 28 (Mine Street) on the west side of downtown; US 221 leaves its concurrency with SC 28 coming from Augusta and joins US 378 through the downtown area. The U.S. Highways have a grade crossing of CSX's McCormick Subdivision and diverge on the east side of town, with US 221 heading northeast as Greenwood Highway.

US 378 leaves McCormick, passes McCormick County Airport, and forms the southern boundary of Sumter National Forest east of the town. East of Liberty Hill, where the highway fully enters the national forest, the road crosses the McCormick–Edgefield county line. US 378 again forms the southern boundary of Sumter National Forest from its intersection with SC 67 (Callison Highway). The highway also intersects US 25 and SC 430 (Meeting Street Road) while passing along the northern tier of Edgefield County. US 378 leaves the national forest shortly after entering Saluda County. The highway enters the town of Saluda along Church Street and intersects Main Street, which carries US 178, SC 39, and SC 121. Two blocks to the east, US 378 turns north onto Jennings Street, then turns east on Travis Avenue at its junction with SC 194, which heads north on Jennings Street, and US 178 Connector, which heads west on Travis Avenue to connect with US 178.

==== Saluda to Sumter ====
US 378 crosses the Little Saluda River and leaves Saluda along Columbia Highway. After crossing Clouds Creek, the highway meets SC 391 (Prosperity Highway/Summerland Highway) at a roundabout and enters Lexington County. East of the Hollow Creek and Horse Creek branches of Lake Murray, US 378 expands to a four-lane road with center turn lane. The highway becomes concurrent with US 1 (Main Street) on the western edge of the town of Lexington. After US 1 splits southeast to head to the center of town, US 378 continues on Columbia Avenue, then has a brief concurrency with SC 6 along Lake Drive. The U.S. Highway exits the town along Sunset Boulevard. US 378 has a partial cloverleaf interchange with I-20 and a single-point urban interchange with I-26 before entering the city of West Columbia. The highway meets the northern ends of SC 35 (12th Street) and SC 12 Connector (9th Street), which provides access to westbound SC 12. East of the connector route, US 378 becomes a four-lane undivided highway. The highway has a partial interchange with SC 12 (Jarvis Klapman Boulevard) that only allows access to and from Columbia.

US 378 meets US 1 (Meeting Street) and the northern end of SC 2 (State Street) just before the two U.S. Highways cross the Congaree River on the four-lane Gervais Street Bridge into Richland County and the city of Columbia. The highways follow four-lane divided Gervais Street past EdVenture and the South Carolina State Museum and intersect Huger Street, which carries US 21, US 176, and US 321. US 378 and US 1 cross over Norfolk Southern Railway's W Line and pass through the Congaree Vista neighborhood. At the intersection with SC 48 (Assembly Street), the highways pass between the South Carolina State House and Capitol Center. US 378 begins its long concurrency with US 76 when the latter highway turns onto Gervais Street from Bull Street. The three U.S. Highways cross over Norfolk Southern's Columbia District rail line before reaching Millwood Avenue, where US 1 turns north and US 378 and US 76 turn south. Gervais Street continues east as an unnumbered street several blocks through a residential area before reaching its eastern terminus.

US 378 and US 76 follow Millwood Avenue, a four-lane street with center turn lane, southeast to an oblique intersection with Devine Street. Devine Street carries US 21 Connector and US 76 Connector west through Five Points and the University of South Carolina campus. The U.S. Highways continue east along Devine Street to their intersection with SC 16 (Beltline Boulevard), where the road expands to six lanes. A short distance to the east, US 378 and US 76 have an intersection with SC 760 (Fort Jackson Boulevard), which heads east toward the namesake military installation, and a second US 76 Connector that follows Cross Hill Road north to SC 16. East of their intersection with a third US 76 Connector, which heads east on Wildcat Road and west on Rosewood Drive, the U.S. Highways continue as Garners Ferry Road. US 378 and US 76 meet the western end of SC 262 (Leesburg Road) just west of the U.S. Highways' and state highway's partial cloverleaf interchanges with I-77 (Veterans Memorial Freeway). Southeast of I-77, the road becomes a four-lane divided highway, leaves the city of Columbia, and meet the northern end of SC 768 (Pineview Road). US 378 and US 76 enter a rural area and pass through Horrell Hill, where they meet the northern end of SC 769 (Congaree Road), pass McEntire Joint National Guard Base, and have a junction with the western end of SC 764 (Old Eastover Road). The U.S. Highways have a diamond interchange with US 601 (McCords Ferry Road) and an intersection with SC 263 (Vanbloken Road) north of Eastover before they cross the Wateree River into Sumter County.

==== Sumter to Conway ====
East of the extensive swamp surrounding the Wateree River, US 378 and US 76 pass south of the village of Stateburg and intersect SC 261 (Kings Highway). East of SC 441, Peach Orchard Road/Patriot Parkway), the U.S. Highways enter the city of Sumter, through the western portion of which they follow Broad Street. US 378 and US 76 have a trumpet interchange with Shaw Drive, the main access to Shaw Air Force Base, and follow the southern boundary of the military reservation. East of the base, the highways pass through a commercial area and meet the northern end of SC 120 (Alice Drive) just west of where Broad Street continues along US 76 Business while the U.S. Highways continue along the Robert E. Graham Freeway. Just east of the business route, US 378 and US 76 have a half-diamond interchange with US 521 (Camden Highway) allowing access with US 521 to and from the east; the other movements are made via US 76 Business and Jefferson Road. A pair of frontage roads parallels the freeway; the U.S. Highways have right-in/right-out interchanges with the frontage roads just west of the overpass of US 15 (Main Street). The frontage roads end at the freeway's diamond interchange with US 401. US 378 and US 76 cross a rail spur before highways exit the city of Sumter and the frontage roads reappear along the freeway. The U.S. Highways diverge at their partial cloverleaf interchange with the eastern end of US 76 Business (Liberty Street); US 76 heads east as Florence Highway while US 378 continues southeast along the freeway to East Sumter, where it ends at the eastern terminus of SC 763 (Myrtle Beach Highway).

US 378 continues east as Myrtle Beach Highway, a four-lane divided highway. The highway crosses the Black River and intersects SC 527 (Brick Church Road) at McBrides Corner. US 378 has an acute junction with SC 53 (Narrow Paved Road) and a diamond interchange with I-95 before entering Clarendon County, where the route follows Clarence Coker Highway. The highway becomes undivided as it enters the town of Turbeville. US 378 runs concurrently with US 301 along four-lane undivided Main Street, which intersects SC 58 (Gamble Street) one block north of the US 378–US 301 junction. The two U.S. Highways split near the northern end of town, with US 378 continuing east as a four-lane road with center turn lane. The highway enters Florence County, where its name changes to Turbeville Highway, then returns to the county line and runs atop the southern boundary of Florence County. During this stretch, the county to the south of the highway becomes Williamsburg County. Soon after US 378 fully enters Florence County, the highway intersects SC 341 (Olanta Highway). The two highways briefly run together before SC 341 continues straight concurrent with US 378 Business on Lake City's Main Street while US 378 splits northeast to bypass Lake City. North of the town, the U.S. Highway has a diamond interchange with US 52 (Ron McNair Boulevard). US 378 crosses over CSX's Charleston Subdivision before collecting the eastern end of US 378 Business (Myrtle Beach Highway).

US 378 continues northeast as Myrtle Beach Highway. The highway crosses the Lynches River and curves southeast and then east through the hamlet of Hannah. SC 51 (Pamplico Highway) joins US 378 on a tangent curve at Salem and follows the U.S. Highway east to Kingsburg, where SC 51 turns south onto Kingsburg Highway and SC 41 joins the U.S. Highway as it curves northeast U.S. Highway 378 reduces to two lanes near Capitola Road in Johnsonville. and crosses the Great Pee Dee River into Marion County. The two highways curve southeast and cross over CSX's Andrews Subdivision before SC 41 splits to the north on a tangent curve. The U.S. Highway meets the southern end of SC 908 south of Brittons Neck before it curves east and crosses the Little Pee Dee River into Horry County. US 378 expands to a four-lane road with center turn lane shortly after passing Conway-Horry County Airport and enters the city of Conway as Wright Boulevard. West of downtown, the U.S. Highway has an oblique intersection with Church Street, which carries US 501 through the intersection and US 701 north of the intersection. Southbound US 701 continues south on Church Street to a ramp to 4th Avenue while northbound US 701 runs concurrently with US 378 from 4th Avenue, which heads west as US 701 toward Georgetown and east as SC 905. US 378 curves northeast, becomes 3rd Avenue, and reduces to two lanes as it enters the Conway Downtown Historic District, where it reaches its eastern terminus at US 501 Business (Main Street) next to the Old Conway County Courthouse.

== History ==
In the early part of the 21st century, the bridge crossing the Georgia–South Carolina state line over the Savannah River was deemed to be "structurally deficient". It wasn't until 2014 that Alabama-based Scott Bridge Company began construction on a replacement for the bridge. It wasn't determined that the bridge was in danger of collapse; rather, the term was used in reference to a possible crack or split in the concrete of the bridge. Construction began in April 2010. However, in 2012, construction was halted due to a "rare chemical reaction", known as delayed ettringite. This condition caused the support columns of the bridge to swell up and begin splitting. It was the first time this condition was ever encountered in Georgia. It was discovered after personnel from GDOT, Scott Bridge Company, and scientists from the Georgia Institute of Technology conducted a thorough examination of the bridge and supporting structure. In Spring 2014, construction resumed, using a new method in which water cools freshly-poured concrete while it cures. The $36.2 million bridge opened on December 21, 2016.

=== South Carolina Highway 54 ===
South Carolina Highway 54
- Location: Sumter–Salem
- Existed: c.1926–1951

South Carolina Highway 54 (SC 54) was a state highway that was established around 1926 from SC 3 (now US 76 Business) in Sumter east to SC 4 (now US 301) in Turbeville. In 1929, it was extended to the east to end at SC 341 in Lake City. In 1939, SC 54, along with US 52 and SC 341, was extended farther into Lake City. Then, SC 54 was extended to SC 51 in Salem. Between 1943 and 1947, its path just west of the Lynches River was straightened out. In late 1951, it was decommissioned; most of its path was redesignated as part of US 378.

== Major intersections ==
State	County	Location	mi	km	Destinations	Notes
Georgia	Wilkes	Washington	0.000	0.000	US 78 / SR 10 / SR 17 (Sam McGill Parkway) – Elberton, Athens, Lexington, Richard B. Russell State Park US 78 Bus. west / SR 10 Bus. west / SR 17 Bus. north / SR 47 west (R. Toombs Avenue) – Washington, Crawfordville	Western terminus; eastern terminus of US 78 Bus./SR 10 Bus./SR 17 Bus.; western end of concurrency with SR 47
Georgia	Wilkes		0.169	0.272	SR 47 Conn. south to US 78 east / SR 10 east / SR 17 south – Thomson	
Georgia	Lincoln		13.241	21.309	SR 220 east – Thomson	
Georgia	Lincoln	Lincolnton	15.899	25.587	SR 43 south / SR 47 east (Elm Street) – Appling, Augusta	Eastern end of concurrency with SR 47; western end of concurrency with SR 43
Georgia	Lincoln	Lincolnton	17.804	28.653	SR 79 north (New Petersburg Road) – Elberton	
Georgia	Lincoln		17.888	28.788	SR 43 Conn. south (Old Petersburg Road) – Appling	
Georgia	Lincoln		21.827	35.127	SR 220 west – Kenna	
Savannah River			23.252 0.00	37.420 0.00	Lake Strom Thurmond / Clarks Hill Lake — Georgia–South Carolina state line	
South Carolina	McCormick	McCormick	7.04	11.33	US 221 south / SC 28 (Mine Street) – Abbeville, Augusta	West end of concurrency with US 221
South Carolina	McCormick	McCormick	7.61	12.25	US 221 north (Greenwood Highway) – Greenwood	East end of concurrency with US 221
South Carolina	Edgefield		17.82	28.68	SC 67 north (Callison Highway) to Walker Road (S-19-35) / SC 283 – Callison, Greenwood	
South Carolina	Edgefield		21.92	35.28	US 25 – Greenwood, Edgefield	
South Carolina	Edgefield	Meeting Street	28.85	46.43	SC 430 south (Meeting Street Road) – Edgefield	
South Carolina	Saluda	Saluda	39.46	63.50	US 178 / SC 39 / SC 121 (Main Street) – Greenwood, Johnston	
South Carolina	Saluda	Saluda	39.83	64.10	SC 194 north (North Jennings Street) to Travis Avenue (US 178 Conn. west) west / US 178 – Newberry, Greenwood	
South Carolina	Saluda		53.83	86.63	SC 391 (Prosperity Highway / Summerland Highway) – Prosperity, Batesburg, Camp Barstow	Traffic circle
South Carolina	Lexington	Lexington	71.37	114.86	US 1 south (West Main Street) – Aiken, Batesburg-Leesville	West end of concurrency with US 1
South Carolina	Lexington	Lexington	72.03	115.92	US 1 north (West Main Street) – Columbia	East end of concurrency with US 1
South Carolina	Lexington	Lexington	72.70	117.00	SC 6 south (North Lake Drive) – Business District	West end of concurrency with SC 6
South Carolina	Lexington	Lexington	72.99	117.47	SC 6 north (North Lake Drive)	East end of concurrency with SC 6
South Carolina	Lexington		78.10	125.69	I-20 – Florence, Augusta	I-20 exit 61
South Carolina	Lexington		80.44	129.46	I-26 – Spartanburg, Charleston	I-26 exit 110
South Carolina	Lexington	West Columbia	82.36	132.55	SC 35 south (12th Street)	
South Carolina	Lexington	West Columbia	82.92	133.45	9th Street (SC 12 Conn. south)	
South Carolina	Lexington	West Columbia	83.47	134.33	SC 12 east – Columbia	Interchange
South Carolina	Lexington	West Columbia	83.72	134.73	US 1 south (Meeting Street) to I-26 west / State Street (SC 2 south)	West end of concurrency with US 1
South Carolina	Richland	Columbia	84.36	135.76	US 21 / US 176 / US 321 (Huger Street)	
South Carolina	Richland	Columbia	84.98	136.76	SC 48 (Assembly Street)	
South Carolina	Richland	Columbia	85.38	137.41	US 76 west (Bull Street)	West end of concurrency with US 76
South Carolina	Richland	Columbia	86.36	138.98	US 1 north (Millwood Avenue) – Camden	East end of concurrency with US 1
South Carolina	Richland	Columbia	87.77	141.25	Devine Street west (US 76 Conn. west / US 76 Conn. west) to US 21 / US 321 / Millwood Avenue ends	Eastern terminus of US 21 Conn. and western segment of US 76 Conn., which use Devine Street
South Carolina	Richland	Columbia	88.66	142.68	SC 16 (Beltline Boulevard)	
South Carolina	Richland	Columbia	88.87	143.02	SC 760 east (Fort Jackson Boulevard) to SC 16 north (US 76 Conn. west) / Cross Hill Road	Eastern terminus of central segment of US 76 Conn.; western terminus of SC 760
South Carolina	Richland	Columbia	89.11	143.41	Rosewood Drive west / Wildcat Road east (US 76 Conn.) – Midlands Technical College Beltline Campus, Jim Hamilton–L.B. Owens Airport, Fort Jackson	Eastern segment of US 76 Conn.
South Carolina	Richland	Columbia	90.44	145.55	SC 262 east (Leesburg Road)	
South Carolina	Richland	Columbia	90.63	145.85	I-77 – Charlotte, Charleston, Spartanburg	I-77 exit 9
South Carolina	Richland		92.94	149.57	SC 768 south (Pineview Road)	
South Carolina	Richland	Horrell Hill	98.17	157.99	SC 769 south (Congaree Road) – Gadsden	
South Carolina	Richland		102.56	165.05	SC 764 east (Old Eastover Road) – Eastover	
South Carolina	Richland		107.55	173.08	US 601 (McCords Ferry Road) – St. Matthews, Camden	Diamond interchange
South Carolina	Richland		109.87	176.82	SC 263 south (Vanboklen Road) – Eastover	
South Carolina	Sumter	Stateburg	117.18	188.58	SC 261 (Kings Highway) – Pinewood, Camden	
South Carolina	Sumter		118.89	191.33	SC 441 (Peach Orchard Road/Patriot Parkway) – Bishopville	
South Carolina	Sumter	Sumter	119.32	192.03	Shaw Drive – Shaw Air Force Base	Trumpet interchange
South Carolina	Sumter	Sumter	125.69	202.28	SC 120 south (Alice Drive)	
South Carolina	Sumter	Sumter	125.91	202.63	US 76 Bus. east (Broad Street) to US 521	No access from westbound US 378 to eastbound US 76 Business
South Carolina	Sumter	Sumter	126.31	203.28	US 521 (Camden Highway) – Camden	Westbound exit, eastbound entrance
South Carolina	Sumter	Sumter	128.31	206.49	US 15 (Main Street) – Bishopville	Right-in/right-out interchanges with frontage roads
South Carolina	Sumter	Sumter	130.08	209.34	US 401 (Oswego Highway) – Darlington	Diamond interchange
South Carolina	Sumter	Sumter	130.96	210.76	US 76 east (Florence Highway) / US 76 Bus. west (Liberty Street) – Florence	East end of concurrency with US 76
South Carolina	Sumter	East Sumter	132.34	212.98	SC 763 south (Myrtle Beach Highway) – Sumter	No direct access from eastbound SC 763 to westbound US 378
South Carolina	Sumter		141.05	227.00	SC 527 (Brick Church Road) – Bishopville, Kingstree	
South Carolina	Sumter		142.58	229.46	SC 53 east (Narrow Paved Road) – Shiloh	
South Carolina	Sumter		144.30	232.23	I-95 – Florence, Savannah	I-95 exit 135
South Carolina	Clarendon	Turbeville	148.75	239.39	US 301 south (Main Street) – Manning	West end of concurrency with US 301
South Carolina	Clarendon	Turbeville	148.85	239.55	SC 58 north (Gamble Street) – Shiloh	
South Carolina	Clarendon	Turbeville	149.47	240.55	US 301 north – Olanta	East end of concurrency with US 301
South Carolina	Florence		162.25	261.12	SC 341 west (Olanta Highway) – Olanta	West end of concurrency with SC 341
South Carolina	Florence		162.51	261.53	US 378 Bus. / SC 341 east (Main Street) – Lake City	East end of concurrency with SC 341
South Carolina	Florence		164.77	265.17	US 52 (Ron McNair Boulevard) – Lake City, Scranton	Diamond interchange
South Carolina	Florence		165.87	266.94	US 378 Bus. west (Myrtle Beach Highway) – Lake City	
South Carolina	Florence		181.03	291.34	SC 51 north (Pamplico Highway) – Pamplico	West end of concurrency with SC 51
South Carolina	Florence		184.47	296.88	SC 41 / SC 51 south (Kingsburg Highway) – Johnsonville	East end of concurrency with SC 51; west end of concurrency with SC 41
South Carolina	Marion		188.01	302.57	SC 41 north – Mullins	East end of concurrency with SC 41
South Carolina	Marion		193.54	311.47	SC 908 north – Brittons Neck	
South Carolina	Horry	Conway	210.02	337.99	US 501 / US 701 (Church Street / US 378 Truck north / US 701 Truck north / SC 90 Truck east) – Myrtle Beach, Marion	Western end of northbound US 701 concurrency; southern terminus of US 378 Truck and US 701 Truck; western terminus of SC 90 Truck
South Carolina	Horry	Conway	210.19	338.27	US 701 south / SC 905 north (4th Avenue / US 378 Truck south / US 701 Truck south) – Georgetown, Longs	Eastern end of northbound US 701 concurrency; northern terminus of US 378 Truck and US 701 Truck
South Carolina	Horry	Conway	210.89	339.39	US 501 Bus. (Main Street) / 3rd Avenue east – Loris, Myrtle Beach, North Myrtle Beach	Eastern terminus
1.000 mi = 1.609 km; 1.000 km = 0.621 mi: Concurrency terminus; Incomplete access

== Special routes ==
=== Lexington connector route ===
U.S. Highway 378 Connector
- Location: Lexington, South Carolina
- Length: 0.106 mi (171 m)

U.S. Route 378 Connector (US 378 Conn.) is a 0.106-mile (171 m) connector route that connects US 378 to SC 6. It is an unsigned highway.

=== Sumter business loop ===
U.S. Highway 378 Business
- Location: Sumter, South Carolina
- Length: 6.6 mi (10.6 km)
- Existed: 1958–1975

U.S. Route 378 Business (US 378 Bus.) was a 6.6-mile (10.6 km) business route of US 378 that existed in Sumter. It used Broad Street, Liberty Street, and Myrtle Beach Boulevard. It was established in 1958 as a renumbering of mainline US 378 through downtown Sumter.

=== Lake City business loop ===
U.S. Highway 378 Business
- Location: Lake City, South Carolina
- Length: 4.490 mi (7.226 km)
- Existed: 1958–present

U.S. Route 378 Business (US 378 Bus.) is a 4.490-mile (7.226 km) business route of US 378 through Lake City. The highway travels from US 378 and South Carolina Highway 341 (SC 341) west of the city to US 378 east of the city. US 378 Bus. begins heading east from US 378 (Turbeville Highway) concurrent with SC 341 along two-lane Main Street. The two highways enter the city just east of Lake City Memorial Park. In the center of the city, US 378 Bus. and SC 341 have an intersection with US 52 (Ron McNair Boulevard). One block after their grade crossing of CSX's Charleston Subdivision, the highways diverge. The main highway continues east on Main Street while the business route turns north onto Church Street. US 378 Bus. leaves the city limits at its crossing of Lake Swamp and reaches its eastern terminus at US 378 (Myrtle Beach Highway).

=== Conway truck route ===
U.S. Highway 378 Truck
- Location: Conway, South Carolina
- Length: 27.328 mi (43.980 km)

U.S. Route 378 Truck (US 378 Truck) is a truck route of US 378 that partially exists in Conway and Red Hill. It directs truck traffic onto US 501, South Carolina Highway 544 Connector (Red Hill 1) (SC 544 Conn.), US 501 Business (US 501 Bus.), SC 90, Old Reaves Ferry Road, and SC 905. Its entire length is concurrent with US 701 Truck. It is loosely signed, frequently in Conway and Red Hill, and infrequently outside the city limits of both locales.
