= Interstate 77 in South Carolina =

Highway in South Carolina

Interstate 77
- Blue Star Memorial Highway
- I-77 highlighted in red

Route information
- Maintained by SCDOT
- Length: 91.2 mi (146.8 km)
- Existed: 1975–present
- NHS: Entire route

Major junctions
- South end: I-26 in Cayce
- US 21 / US 176 / US 321 in Cayce; US 76 / US 378 in Columbia; I-20 in Columbia; US 1 in Columbia; US 21 (multiple times)
- North end: I-77 / US 21 at the NC state line in Charlotte, NC

Location
- Country: United States
- State: South Carolina
- Counties: Lexington, Richland, Fairfield, Chester, York

Highway system
- Interstate Highway System; Main; Auxiliary; Suffixed; Business; Future; South Carolina State Highway System; Interstate; US; State; Scenic
← US 76	→ US 78

Interstate 77 (I-77) is a north–south Interstate Highway, extending 91.2 miles (146.8 km) in the state of South Carolina, from the southern terminus at an interchange with I-26 near Columbia, north to the North Carolina state line near Rock Hill and Charlotte, North Carolina.

== Route description ==
I-77 is designated a Blue Star Memorial Highway for its entire length in South Carolina. The highway also has a trio of designations in the Columbia area. I-77 is named the Veterans Memorial Freeway from I-26 to the Congaree River, the William Earle Berne Beltway from the river to I-20, and the Charles F. Bolden Freeway from I-20 to the Richland–Fairfield county line.

I-77 begins at a semi-directional T interchange with I-26 in the city of Cayce. The interchange includes a pair of ramps between I-77 and Charleston Highway, which carries US Highway 21 (US 21), US 176, and US 321. I-77 heads east as a six-lane freeway that crosses over CSX's Columbia Subdivision and has a diamond interchange with South Carolina Highway 35 (SC 35; 12th Street Extension). The Interstate crosses the Lexington–Richland county line on its bridge across the Congaree River. I-77 has a partial cloverleaf interchange with SC 48 (Bluff Road), crosses Gills Creek, and meets SC 768 (Shop Road) at a cloverleaf interchange.

I-77 enters the city of Columbia at its crossings of Norfolk Southern Railway's SC Line and CSX's Eastover Subdivision. The freeway has a connected pair of elongated partial cloverleaf interchanges with US 76 and US 378 (Garners Ferry Road) and SC 262 (Leesburg Road). The Interstate passes through an S-curve, within which the highway has a diamond interchange with SC 760 (Fort Jackson Boulevard), then follows the western edge of Fort Jackson. I-77 has a diamond interchange with Forest Drive and Strom Thurmond Boulevard and a partial interchange with Decker Boulevard as it veers northeast. The freeway veers north and leaves the military base and the city of Columbia at its partial cloverleaf interchange with SC 12 (Percival Road).

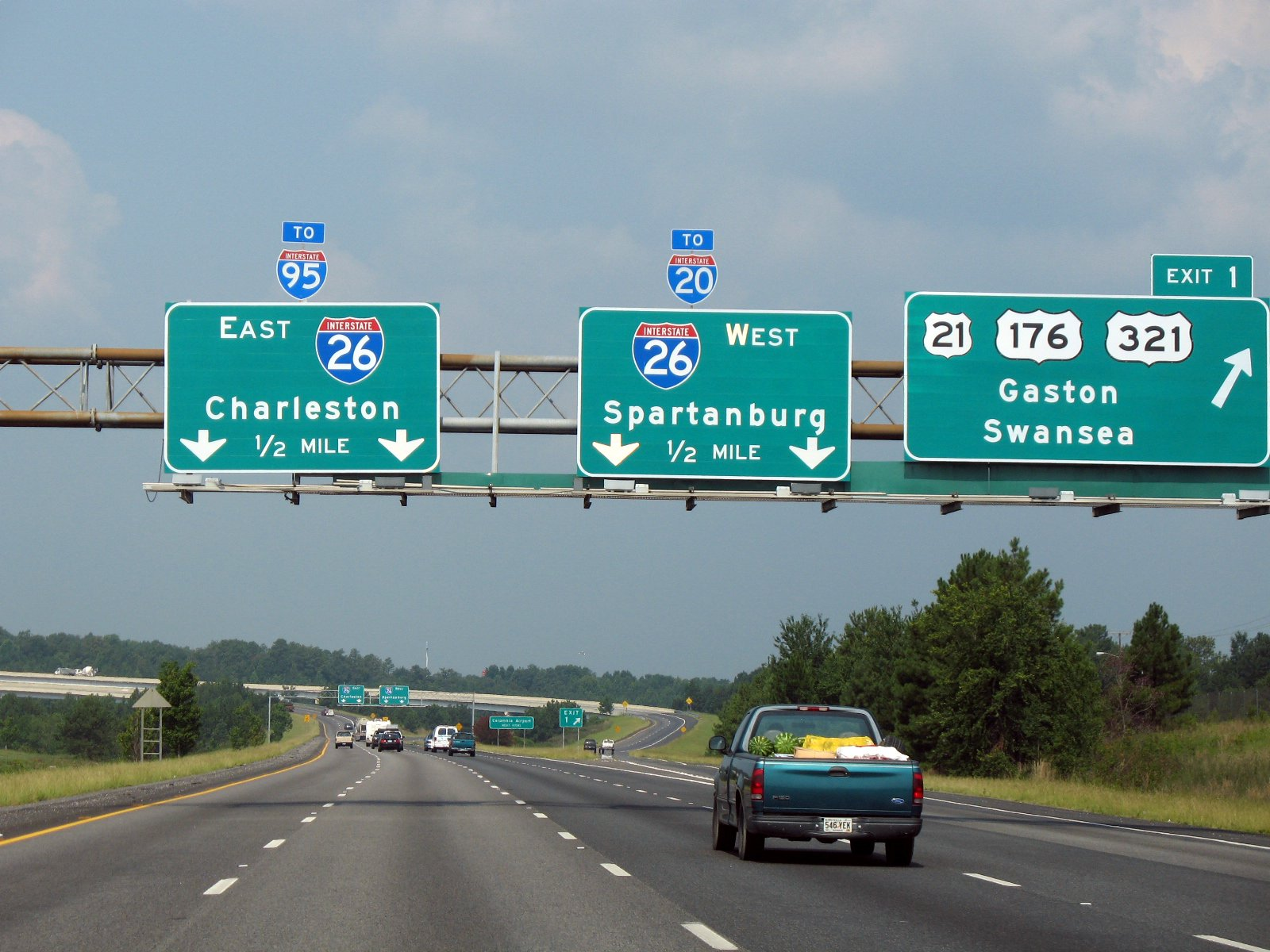
I-77 southbound ends at I-26.

I-77 passes through the unincorporated suburb of Woodfield and meets I-20 at an interchange with a pair of flyover ramps; there is no access from eastbound I-20 to northbound I-77. The Interstate continues as a six-lane freeway across Windsor Lake into the suburb of Dentsville. The freeway passes under CSX's Hamlet Subdivision and has a partial cloverleaf interchange with US 1 (Two Notch Road). I-77 has a partial interchange with SC 277; the interchange includes ramps from southbound I-77 to SC 277 and from SC 277 to northbound I-77. Intertwined with the SC 277 interchange is a partial cloverleaf interchange with SC 555 (Farrow Road); within the interchange, the freeway passes under Norfolk Southern Railway's R-Line. I-77 widens to an eight-lane freeway while it crossed at the interchange with SC 555.

As it leaves the Columbia area, I-77 has a diamond interchange with Killian Road; I-77 downgrades to a six-lane freeway while it does. I-77 continues and crosses US 21 with a partial cloverleaf interchange, (Wilson Boulevard). North of its diamond interchange with Blythewood Road in Blythewood, the highway enters Fairfield County. I-77 meets SC 34 west of the town of Ridgeway and passes under Norfolk Southern Railway's R-Line. The freeway passes to the east of Winnsboro, which is accessed via SC 34 or the next interchange with Road 41. I-77 has junction with Road 20 and SC 200 near Mitford before entering Chester County. The freeway has an interchange with SC 97 (Great Falls Road), which connects the county seat of Chester to the west with the town of Great Falls to the east. Great Falls is where the Piedmont-based Catawba River reaches the Atlantic Seaboard Fall Line and becomes the Wateree River of the Atlantic coastal plain.

At Richburg, I-77 has interchanges with Road 56 and SC 9 (Lancaster Highway) just before the freeway enters York County. The highway has interchanges with SC 901 (Mount Holly Road) and Porter Road on the southeast side of Rock Hill. I-77 expands to eight lanes at its partial cloverleaf interchange with US 21 and SC 5 (Anderson Road) and enters the city of Rock Hill. The freeway has a diamond interchange with SC 122 (Dave Lyle Boulevard) west of the Rock Hill Galleria. North of its underpass of the Columbia District rail line, I-77 has a pair of connected partial cloverleaf interchanges with US 21 (Cherry Road) and SC 161 (Celanese Road). The Interstate then leaves the city of Rock Hill by crossing the Catawba River.

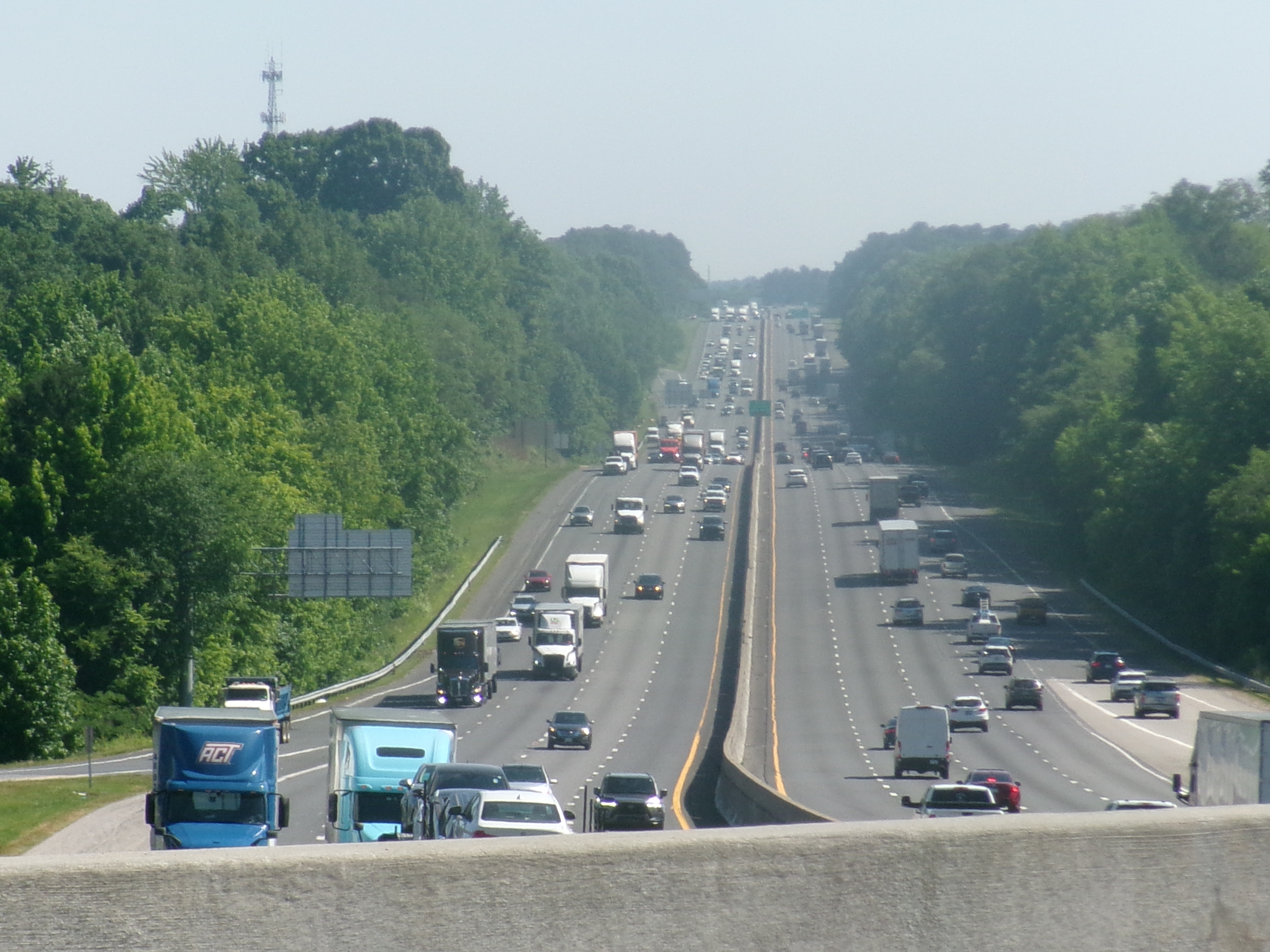
Looking north on I-77 at exit 88

I-77 has interchanges with Sutton Road and SC 160 (Steele Creek Road) as it passes along the western edge of Fort Mill. North of Fort Mill, the Interstate has a diamond interchange with SC 460 (Gold Hill Road). SC 460 provided access to the former Knights Stadium, home of the Charlotte Knights of Minor League Baseball until 2014, when the team moved into BB&T Ballpark (now Truist Field) in Uptown Charlotte. I-77's final interchange in South Carolina is with Carowinds Boulevard, which provides access to the Carowinds theme park immediately to the west on the South Carolina–North Carolina state line. At the partial cloverleaf interchange, US 21 begins to run concurrently with I-77; the two highways cross the state line together into the city of Charlotte.

=== Services ===
The South Carolina Department of Transportation (SCDOT) operates and maintains one welcome center and two rest areas along I-77. The welcome center, which has a travel information facility on site, is located in Fort Mill at milemarker 89 (southbound), and the rest areas are located in Richburg at milemarkers 65 (north and southbound) between exits 65 (SC 9) and 73 (SC 901). Common at all locations are public restrooms, public telephones, vending machines, picnic area, and barbecue grills.

The South Carolina Department of Public Safety (SCDPS) and State Transport Police (STP) operate and maintain two truck inspection/weigh stations. Both truck weigh station can be found in Rock Hill. The northbound weigh station can be found at milemarker 89, and the southbound weigh station can be found at milemarker 85.

== History ==
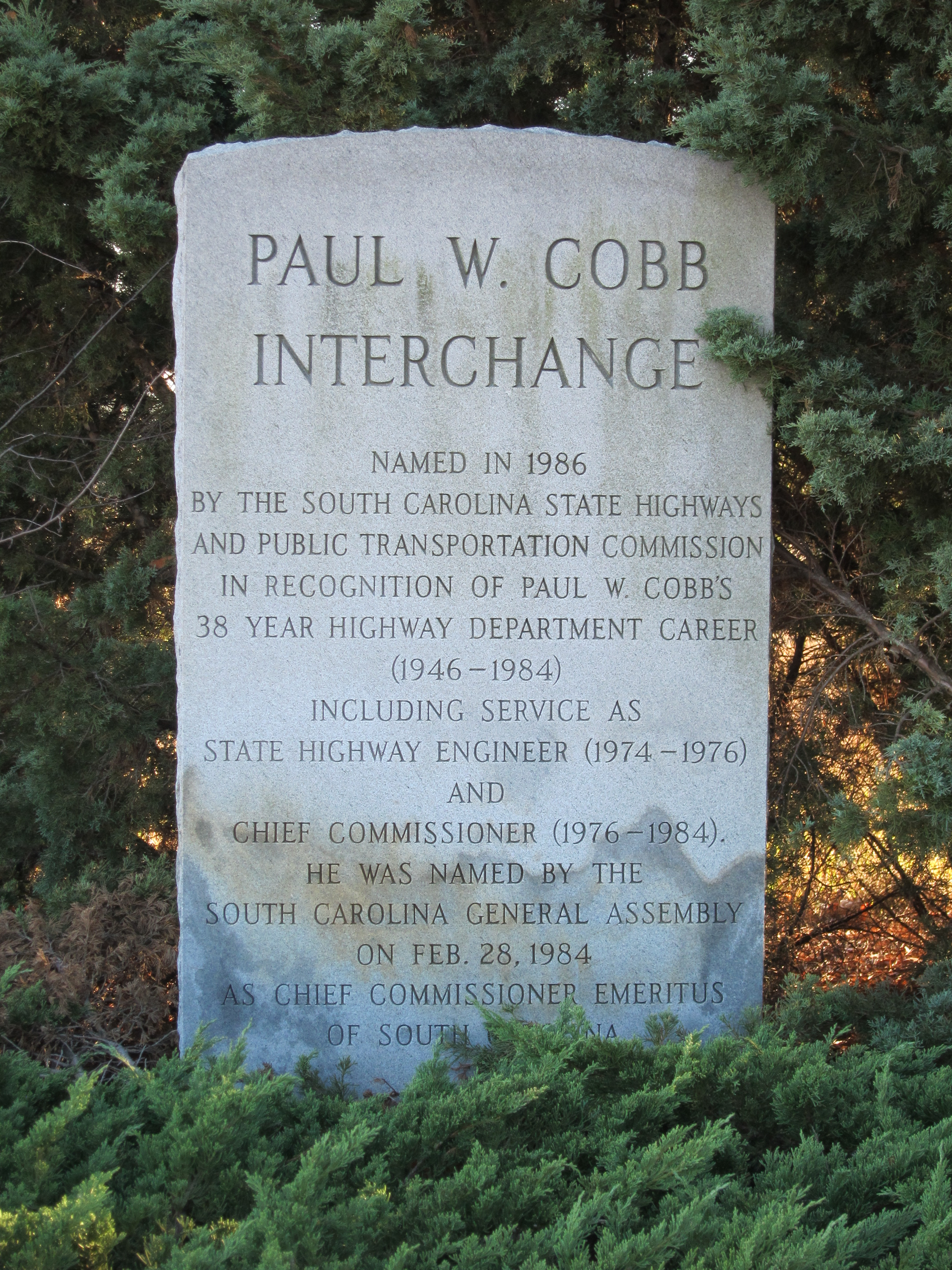
Paul W. Cobb Interchange at I-20/I-77

I-77 was originally planned to terminate at I-85 in Charlotte, North Carolina; in 1969, Congress passed an amendment to the Interstate Highway act to extend the route south along US 21 into South Carolina, where it would continue south terminating at I-20, near Columbia, South Carolina. The proposed routing started appearing around 1971, going south from a stub freeway section of US 21, from the North Carolina state line, to US 21/SC 5, near Rock Hill; by 1975, the entire proposed route on all state and federal maps.

The first section completed and designated as I-77 around in 1975, from US 21 (exit 90) to US 21/SC 161 (exit 82). In 1976, it was extended south to US 21/SC 5 (exit 77). In 1979, I-77 was completed and designated on a southern section from SC 277 (exit 18) to US 21 (exit 24). By 1981, the southern section extended north to SC 34 (exit 34), near Ridgeway; the northern section was also extended south to SC 9 (exit 65). By the end of 1982, the two sections merged, from SC 277 to the North Carolina state line.

In 1987, I-77 was extended south to SC 12 (exit 15), which finally accomplished its original objective of connecting with I-20. However, one year prior, I-77's southern terminus was changed to end at I-26, in Cayce; this created the establishment of Temporary I-77 around Columbia. On June 15, 1995, I-77 was extended east around Columbia on both new primary routing and existing routing, replacing unsigned I-326 and Temporary SC 478. Temporary I-77 was also decommissioned that same year. In the mid-2000s, I-77 was widened to eight lanes from US 21/SC 5 to the North Carolina state line.

In 1976, I-77 received exit numbers along its routing; which were all renumbered in 1987–1988. In May 2024, a new interchange (exit 81) was opened at Red River, near Rock Hill. The new interchange was originally intended to serve the Carolina Panthers headquarters and practice facility, which was later scrapped.

=== Temporary Interstate 77 ===
Temporary Interstate 77
- Location: Cayce-Columbia, South Carolina
- Length: 20 mi (32 km)
- Existed: 1986–1995

Temporary Interstate 77 (Temp I-77) was a temporary designation that directed travelers from exit 116 on I-26, in Cayce, that went clockwise around Columbia, also overlapping I-20 and then SC 277, before connecting with mainline I-77, at exit 18. The 20-mile (32 km) routing affixed temporary shields from 1986 to 1995, when I-77 was extended south to its current southern terminus.

=== Interstate 326 ===
Interstate 326
- Location: Cayce-Columbia, South Carolina
- Length: 5.24 mi (8.43 km)
- Existed: 1976–1995

Interstate 326 (I-326) was an unsigned designation of the six-lane limited-access highway that traversed from I-26, in Cayce, to SC 48, in Columbia. Established in 1976, the freeway was not completed until August 22, 1986; however, it was only labeled as "To SC 48". Around 1990, when the freeway was extended further north, it took the name "Temp SC 478". The unsigned designation remained unchanged until June 15, 1995, when it was renumbered as part of I-77.

=== Temporary South Carolina Highway 478 ===
South Carolina Highway 478 Temporary
- Location: Cayce-Columbia, South Carolina
- Length: 8.5 mi (13.7 km)
- Existed: 1989–1995

Temporary South Carolina Highway 478 (Temp SC 478) was the designation of the six-lane limited-access highway that traversed from I-26, in Cayce, to US 76/US 378, in Columbia. Appearing in 1989, it overlapped the unsigned section of I-326 and then on new freeway, that opened around 1990, from SC 48 to US 76/US 378. On June 15, 1995, it was renumbered as part of I-77. Throughout its existence, it was signed as only temporary.

== Exit list ==
County	Location	mi	km	Old exit	New exit	Destinations	Notes
Lexington	Cayce	0.00	0.00			I-26 – Charleston, Spartanburg	Southern terminus
Lexington	Cayce	1.0	1.6		1	US 21 / US 176 / US 321 – Gaston, Swansea, Columbia	Southbound exit and northbound entrance
Lexington	Cayce	1.8	2.9		2	SC 35 north – Cayce, West Columbia	Southern terminus of SC 35
Congaree River				Alex Sanders Bridge			
Richland	Columbia	5.4	8.7		5	SC 48 (Bluff Road) – Gadsden	
Richland	Columbia	6.5	10.5		6	SC 768 (Shop Road)	Northbound signed exits 6A (east) and 6B (west)
Richland	Columbia	8.6	13.8		9A	US 76 / US 378 (Garners Ferry Road) – Sumter	Southbound signed as exits 9A (east) and 9B (west)
Richland	Columbia	8.9	14.3		9B	SC 262 (Leesburg Road)	
Richland	Columbia	10.4	16.7		10	SC 760 (Jackson Boulevard)	
Richland	Columbia	12.4	20.0		12	Forest Drive west (SC 12 Spur west) / Strom Thurmond Boulevard east – Fort Jackson	Eastern terminus of SC 12 Spur and Forest Drive; western terminus of Strom Thurmond Boulevard
Richland	Columbia	13.5	21.7		13	SC 12 (Decker Boulevard)	Northbound exit and southbound entrance
Richland	Columbia	15.0	24.1		15	SC 12 (Percival Road)	Northbound signed as exits 15A (east) and 15B (west)
Richland	Columbia	16.0	25.7	1	16	I-20 – Florence, Augusta	Signed as exits 16A (east) and 16B (west); no access from EB I-20 to NB I-77
Richland	Columbia	17.5	28.2	2	17	US 1 (Two Notch Road)	
Richland	Columbia	18.8	30.3	3	18	SC 277 south to I-20 west – Columbia, Augusta	Northern terminus of SC 277, southbound exit and northbound entrance
Richland	Columbia	19.2	30.9	4	19	SC 555 (Farrow Road)	
Richland		21.6	34.8	6	22	Killian Road	
Richland	Blythewood	24.3	39.1	8	24	US 21 (Wilson Boulevard) – Blythewood	
Richland	Blythewood	27.4	44.1	11	27	Blythewood Road – Blythewood	
Fairfield		32.4	52.1		32	Peach Road – Ridgeway	
Fairfield		34.1	54.9	18	34	SC 34 – Ridgeway, Winnsboro, Camden	
Fairfield		41.0	66.0	25	41	Road 41 – Winnsboro	
Fairfield		45.7	73.5	30	46	Road 20 – White Oak	
Fairfield		48.2	77.6	32	48	SC 200 – Great Falls, Winnsboro	
Chester		55.3	89.0	39	55	SC 97 – Great Falls, Chester	
Chester		62.5	100.6	46	62	Road 56 – Fort Lawn, Richburg	
Chester		64.7	104.1	49	65	SC 9 – Chester, Lancaster, Fort Lawn	
York	Rock Hill	72.9	117.3	57	73	SC 901 – Rock Hill, York	
York	Rock Hill	75.4	121.3	59	75	Porter Road	
York	Rock Hill	77.2	124.2	61	77	US 21 / SC 5 – Rock Hill, Lancaster	
York	Rock Hill	79.1	127.3	63	79	SC 122 (Dave Lyle Boulevard) – Downtown Rock Hill	
York	Red River	80.4	129.4		81	Palmetto Parkway	
York	Rock Hill	81.7	131.5	66	82	US 21 / SC 161 – Fort Mill, Rock Hill, York	Signed as exits 82A (north), 82B (south), and 82C (SC 161)
York	Catawba River			John McKee Spratt Memorial Bridge			
York	Fort Mill	83.4	134.2	67	83	Sutton Road	
York	Fort Mill	85.6	137.8	69	85	SC 160 – Tega Cay, Fort Mill	
York		87.9	141.5	72	88	SC 460 (Gold Hill Road) – Tega Cay	
York		90.4	145.5	74	90	US 21 south / Carowinds Boulevard – Fort Mill	Southern end of US 21 concurrency; to Carowinds
York		91.2	146.8			I-77 north / US 21 north – Charlotte	Continuation into North Carolina
1.000 mi = 1.609 km; 1.000 km = 0.621 mi: Concurrency terminus; Incomplete access

== See also ==
Interstate 77
Previous state: Terminus	South Carolina	Next state: North Carolina
