= South Carolina Highway 67 =

State highway in South Carolina, United States

South Carolina Highway 67

Route information
- Maintained by SCDOT
- Length: 15.460 mi (24.880 km)

Major junctions
- South end: US 378 in Sumter National Forest near McCormick
- North end: US 25 / US 178 near Greenwood

Location
- Country: United States
- State: South Carolina
- Counties: Edgefield, McCormick, Greenwood

Highway system
- South Carolina State Highway System; Interstate; US; State; Scenic
← SC 66	→ SC 68

South Carolina Highway 67 (SC 67) is a 15.460-mile-long (24.880 km) state highway in the U.S. state of South Carolina. The highway travels through rural areas of Edgefield, McCormick, and Greenwood counties, as well as part of Sumter National Forest.

== Route description ==
SC 67 begins at an intersection with U.S. Route 378 (US 378) in Sumter National Forest, east-northeast of McCormick, within Edgefield County. South of US 378, the roadway continues as Walker Road. It travels in a fairly northern direction through rural areas of the county. About one mile (1.6 km) later, it enters McCormick County. The highway only travels about three miles (4.8 km) through McCormick County before it enters Greenwood County. When SC 67 leaves the national forest, it passes through Callison. The highway keeps traveling through rural areas until it meets its northern terminus, an intersection with US 25/US 178, south-southeast of Greenwood.

== Major intersections ==
County	Location	mi	km	Destinations	Notes
Edgefield	Sumter National Forest	0.000	0.000	US 378 – McCormick, Saluda	
McCormick	No major junctions				
Greenwood		15.460	24.880	US 25 / US 178 – Greenwood	
1.000 mi = 1.609 km; 1.000 km = 0.621 mi: Concurrency terminus
