= South Carolina Highway 263 =

State highway in South Carolina, United States

South Carolina Highway 263

Route information
- Maintained by SCDOT
- Length: 5.250 mi (8.449 km)

Major junctions
- South end: SC 764 in Eastover
- US 601 near Eastover
- North end: US 76 / US 378 near Eastover

Location
- Country: United States
- State: South Carolina
- Counties: Richland

Highway system
- South Carolina State Highway System; Interstate; US; State; Scenic
← SC 262	→ SC 265

South Carolina Highway 263 (SC 263) is a 5.250-mile (8.449 km) state highway in the U.S. state of South Carolina. The highway connects Eastover with rural areas of Richland County.

== Route description ==
SC 263 begins at an intersection with SC 764 (Main Street) in Eastover, Richland County. It travels to the northeast and leaves the city limits. The highway crosses Griffin Creek. Approximately 2,500 feet (760 m) later, it intersects U.S. Route 601 (US 601; McCords Ferry Road). Farther to the northeast, it meets its northern terminus, an intersection with US 76/US 378 (Garners Ferry Road).

== Major intersections ==
The entire route is in Richland County.

Location	mi	km	Destinations	Notes
Eastover	0.000	0.000	SC 764 (Main Street) – Columbia	Southern terminus
	2.220	3.573	US 601 (McCords Ferry Road) – St. Matthews, Camden	
	5.250	8.449	US 76 / US 378 (Garners Ferry Road)	Northern terminus
1.000 mi = 1.609 km; 1.000 km = 0.621 mi
