= South Carolina Highway 555 =

State highway in South Carolina, United States

South Carolina Highway 555
- Farrow Road

Route information
- Maintained by SCDOT
- Length: 14.900 mi (23.979 km)
- Existed: 1942–present

Major junctions
- South end: SC 12 in Columbia
- SC 277 in Columbia; I-20 in Columbia; I-77 in Columbia
- North end: US 21 near Blythewood

Location
- Country: United States
- State: South Carolina
- Counties: Richland

Highway system
- South Carolina State Highway System; Interstate; US; State; Scenic
← SC 544	→ SC 557

South Carolina Highway 555 (SC 555) is a 14.900-mile (23.979 km) primary state highway in the U.S. state of South Carolina. It serves as an alternate route from downtown Columbia to Blythewood.

== Route description ==
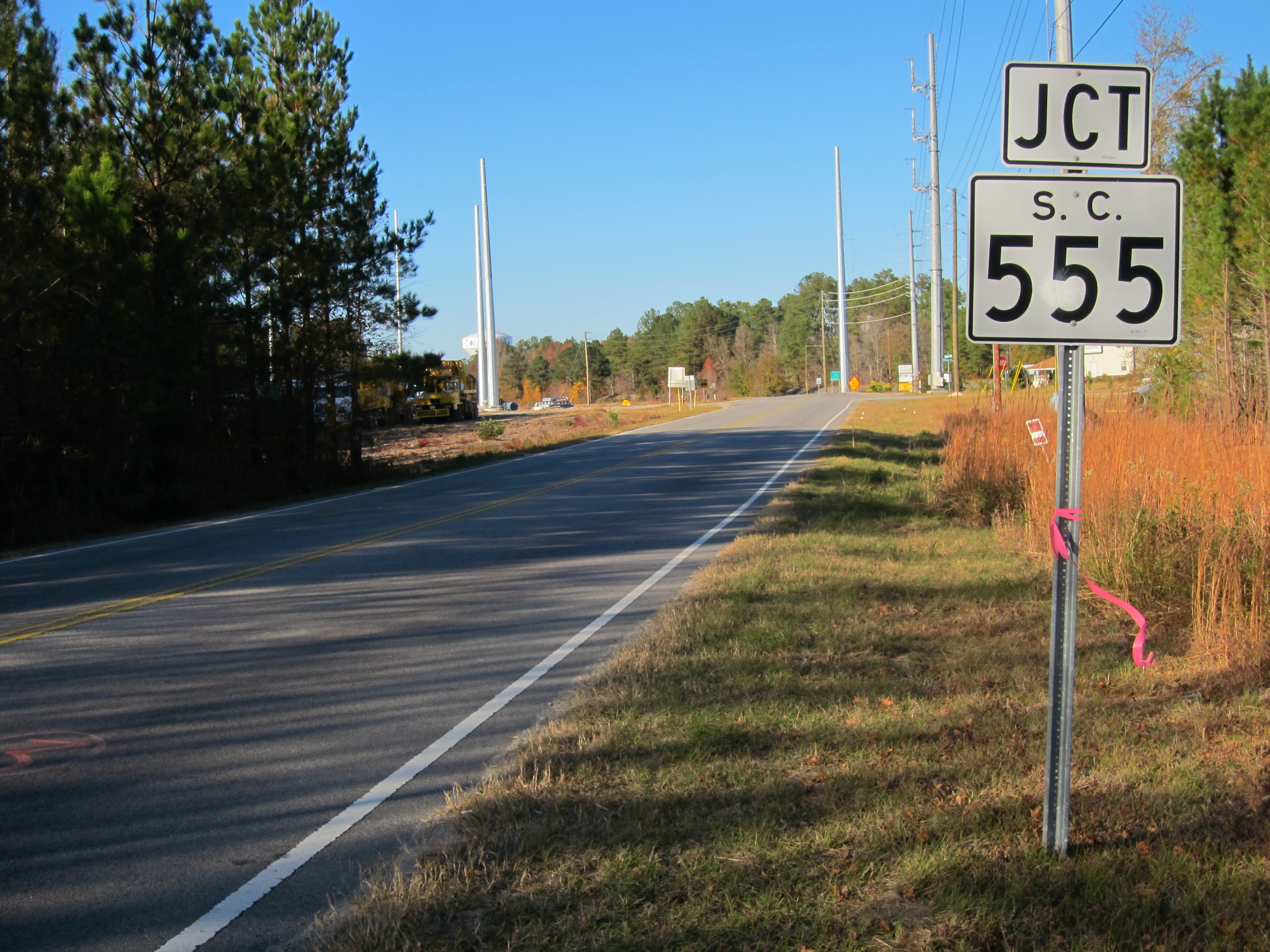
Junction of SC 555 along US 21

SC 555 traverses 14.67 miles (23.61 km) from SC 12 in downtown Columbia to U.S. Route 21 (US 21) near Blythewood. Before Interstate 77 (I-77) was completed in the area, SC 555 served as a major thoroughfare; today it is an alternate route. The highway is four lanes south of I-77 and two lanes north of it.

== History ==
The highway was established in 1941 or 1942 as a new primary routing traveling from SC 12 to US 21. Between 1948 and 1952, the highway was downgraded to secondary status until entire length was paved. SC 555 was widened to four lanes in phases: SC 12 to SC 16 by 1964, to I-20 by 1970, and finally to I-77 by 1982.

== Major junctions ==
The entire route is in Richland County.

Location	mi	km	Destinations	Notes
Columbia	0.000	0.000	SC 12 (Taylor Street) / Harden Street – Fort Jackson	Southern terminus
Columbia	1.630	2.623	SC 16 (W. Beltline Blvd)	
Columbia	1.870	3.009	SC 277 (Bull Street) to I-20 / I-77	Interchange
Columbia	5.770	9.286	I-20 – Florence, Augusta	I-20 exit 72
Columbia	8.062– 8.173	12.975– 13.153	I-77 – Charleston, Charlotte	I-77 exit 19
Blythewood	14.900	23.979	US 21 (Wilson Boulevard) – Columbia, Blythewood	Northern terminus
1.000 mi = 1.609 km; 1.000 km = 0.621 mi
