= Interstate 20 in South Carolina =

Interstate in South Carolina

Interstate 20
- J. Strom Thurmond Freeway
- I-20 highlighted in red

Route information
- Maintained by SCDOT
- Length: 141.51 mi (227.74 km)
- Existed: 1964–present
- NHS: Entire route

Major junctions
- West end: I-20 at the Georgia state line in Augusta, GA
- US 25 / SC 121 in North Augusta; I-520 in North Augusta; US 1 (three times in the state); US 178 near Batesburg-Leesville; US 378 near Lexington; I-26 / US 76 in Columbia; I-77 in Columbia; US 601 / SC 12 in Lugoff; US 521 in Camden; US 401 near Lamar
- East end: I-95 / I-20 BS in Florence

Location
- Country: United States
- State: South Carolina
- Counties: Aiken, Lexington, Richland, Kershaw, Lee, Darlington, Florence

Highway system
- Interstate Highway System; Main; Auxiliary; Suffixed; Business; Future; South Carolina State Highway System; Interstate; US; State; Scenic
← SC 19	→ SC 20

Interstate 20 (I-20) is the main east–west Interstate Highway in the state of South Carolina, linking the state with important transportation and business hubs to the north, west, and south, including Atlanta, Georgia; Charlotte, North Carolina (via I-77); Savannah, Georgia (via I-95); and Washington, D.C. (via I-95). I-20 travels 141.51 miles (227.74 km) west to east, from the Georgia state line at North Augusta, through Columbia, to end at I-95 in Florence.

Beyond its eastern terminus at I-95, the roadway continues as I-20 Business (I-20 Bus.) for about two miles (3.2 km) to U.S. Route 76 (US 76), which goes to downtown Florence.

The Interstate parallels US 1 closely from the state line to Camden where US 1 diverts away from the route and head northeast towards Rockingham, North Carolina while I-20 turns and heads eastward towards Florence.

== Route description ==
=== From North Augusta to Columbia ===
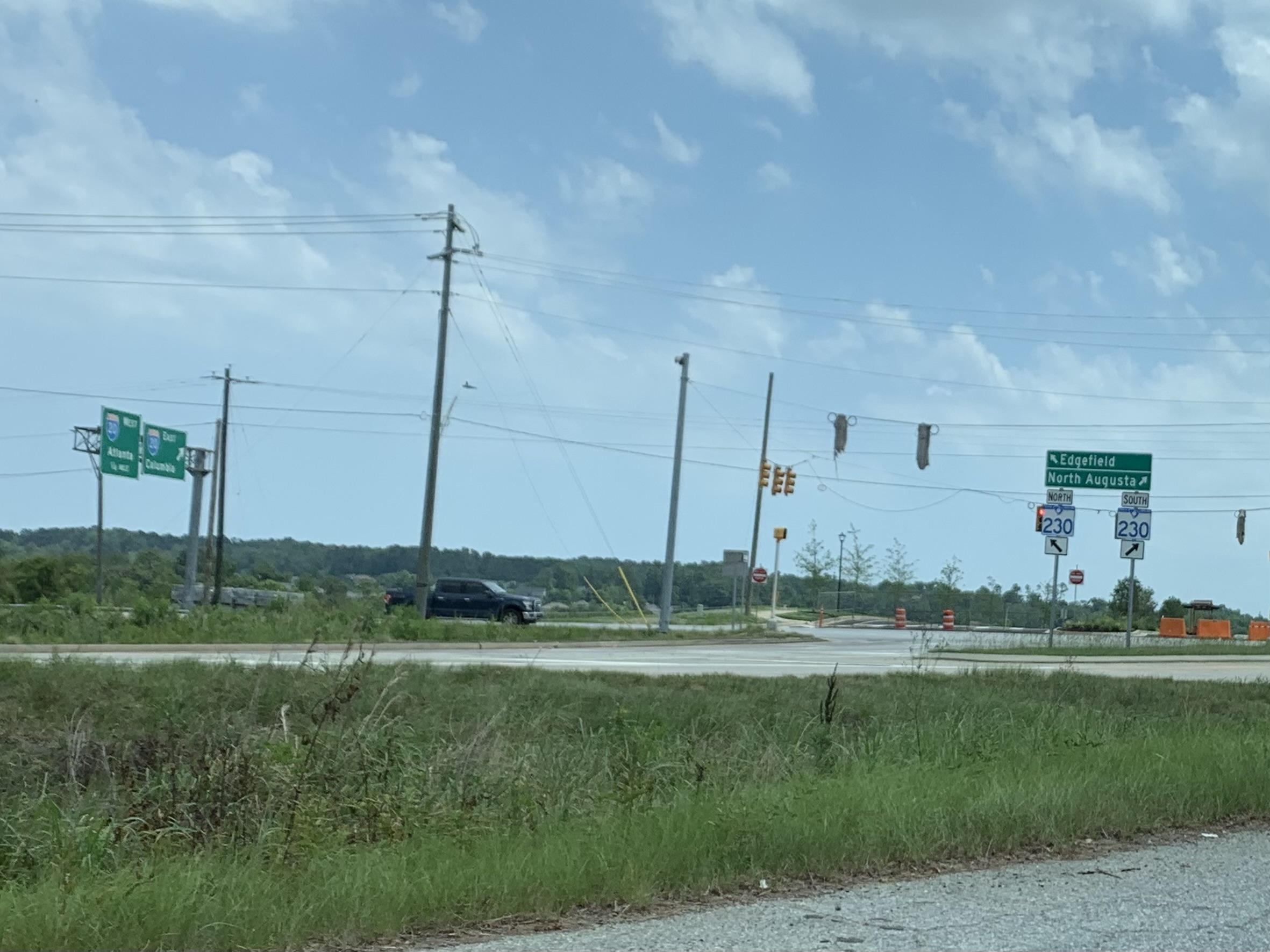
View of SC 230 (West Martintown Road) meeting an interchange with I-20 in North Augusta

I-20 enters the Palmetto State of South Carolina as a continuation of six lane freeway after crossing the Savannah River from Augusta, Georgia. I-20 is known as the J. Strom Thurmond Freeway (named for the US senator) for its entire length in the state. I-20 immediately enters the North Augusta city limits after crossing from the Georgia border. Soon, the eastbound lanes gets access to South Carolina welcome center, before meeting interchange with South Carolina Highway 230 (SC 230 / West Martintown Road), which goes to downtown North Augusta. I-20 narrows to four lanes as it passes below this interchange. I-20 passes north of North Augusta for four miles (6.4 km) before meeting an interchange with U.S. Route 25 (US 25)/SC 121 (Edgefield Road) that goes through downtown of the city, but also connecting to Edgefield and Johnston. US 25 links I-20, north to Greenville. Then immediately meeting the eastern terminus of I-520 (Palmetto Parkway) about half-mile later. I-520 serves as a partial-beltway bypassing North Augusta westward to later bypass Augusta, Georgia.

I-20 leaves the city limits of North Augusta as it continues going northeast to pass city of Graniteville, crossing over SC 191 without an interchange before passing two Aiken exits. I-20 meets an interchange with SC 19 that connects to the city of Aiken. I-20 passes with access to the truck commercial parking before meeting the first interchange (out of three) with US 1, that also provides to city of Aiken. From here, US 1 begins parallel I-20 through most its route til passing Camden.

I-20 leaves Aiken as it meets an interchange with Wire Road linking to the northern beginning of SC 391 toward Batesburg-Leesville. I-20 meets an interchange with SC 39, that connects to Monetta, Ridge Spring, and Wagener. I-20 passes the weigh station, only access from the eastbound lanes before meeting an interchange with US 178, that connects to Pelion and also to Batesburg-Leesville. I-20 later meets Road 34 (Pond Branch Road), which serves to Gilbert.

At the south of Gilbert, after passing a pair of closed rest areas, I-20 widens to six lanes before meets an interchange with Longs Pond Road. After passing with access to the weigh station for the westbound lanes, I-20 leaves the Gilbert community and enters Lexington to meet an interchange with SC 6 (South Lake Drive). The westbound lanes have two exits for SC 6, which exit 55A exits to SC 6 east toward Swansea (signed as Pelion (via SC 302 west from SC 6); although SC 6 doesn’t directly go there) while exit 55B exits to SC 6 west toward downtown Lexington. I-20 curves to the north, crossing over the Norfolk Southern Railroad tracks before meets its second interchange with US 1 (Augusta Road), linking to the Columbia Airport along with the cities of West Columbia, and also to downtown Lexington. I-20 curves back to northeast to have an interchange with US 378 (Sunset Boulevard), which connects to Lexington and West Columbia. US 378 links I-20 to Athens, Georgia via along US 78 from its western terminus in Washington, Georgia.

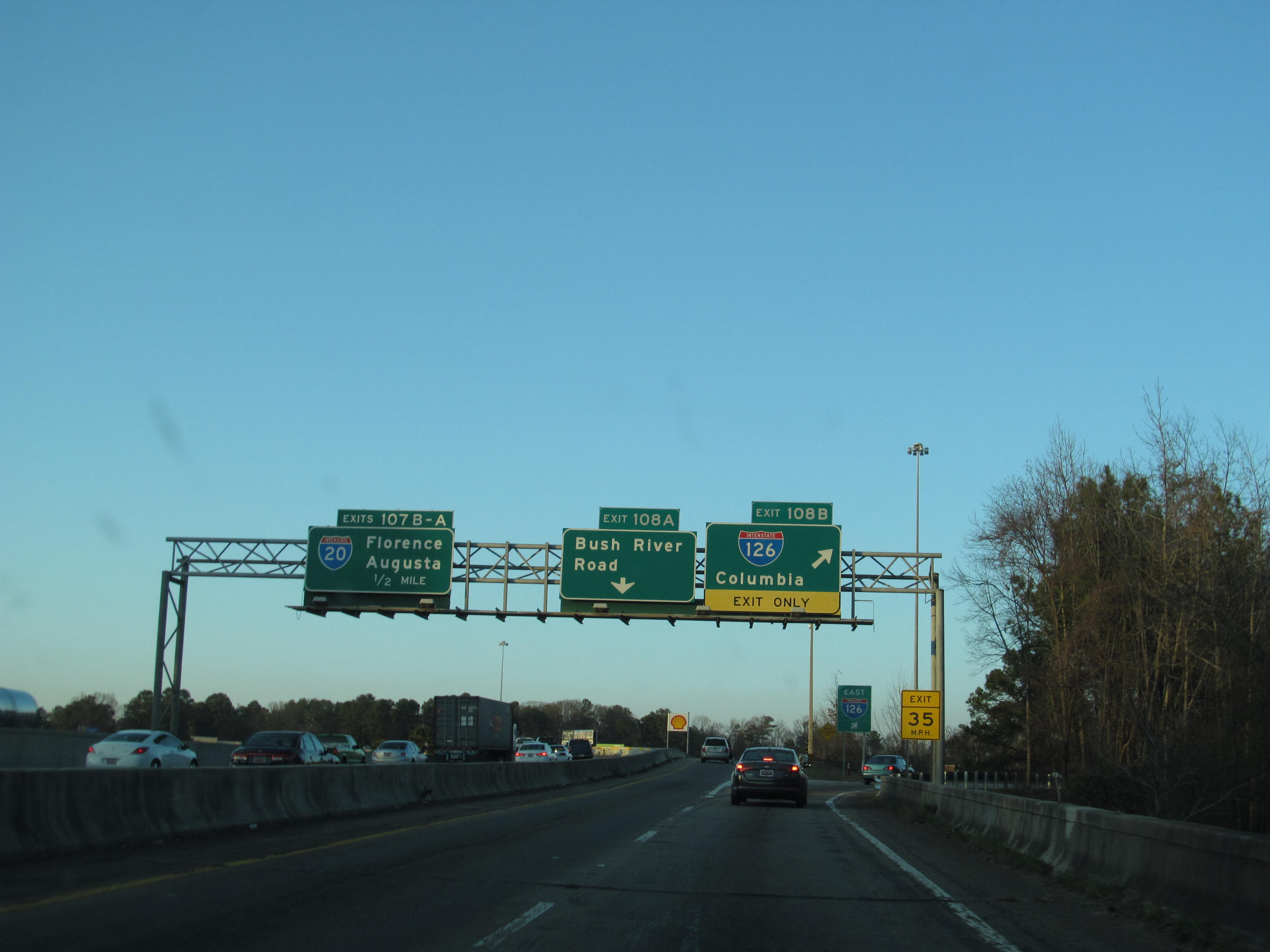
I-26 approaching the Malfunction Junction interchanges to meet with I-126/US 76 east, before immediately meeting I-20 in Columbia; both interchanges are currently being reconfigured; Bush River Road exit was permanently closed in October 2024

I-20 crosses the Saluda River before meeting an interchange with Bush River Road. I-20 widens temporarily to eight lanes before immediately meeting its Malfunction Junction cloverleaf interchange with I-26/US 76 (James F. Byrnes Memorial Freeway), that goes northwest to Spartanburg and southeast to Charleston. I-26 indirectly goes northwest to Greenville via I-385 north. I-126 begins east at I-26, about a mile southeast of I-20, goes eastward with US 76 toward downtown Columbia. During crossing the below the I-26/US 76 interchange, I-20 leaves city limits of Lexington and West Columbia while entering the capital of the city limits of Columbia. SCDOT is currently working on reconstruction the cloverleaf interchange to being reconfigured into turbine interchange, removing the loop ramps, and soon adding a direct ramp from I-20 to I-126 east without merge onto mainline I-26. I-20 narrows back to six lanes, then meets its DDI interchange with US 176 (Broad River Road), shortly after the I-26/US 76 interchange. During crossing below US 176 interchange, I-20 temporarily widens back to eight lanes additionally with three right exit lanes on the westbound lanes for US 176 and westbound I-26/US 76. I-20 is planned to be widened into eight lanes with exit lanes from US 176, westward to US 378.

=== From Columbia to Florence ===
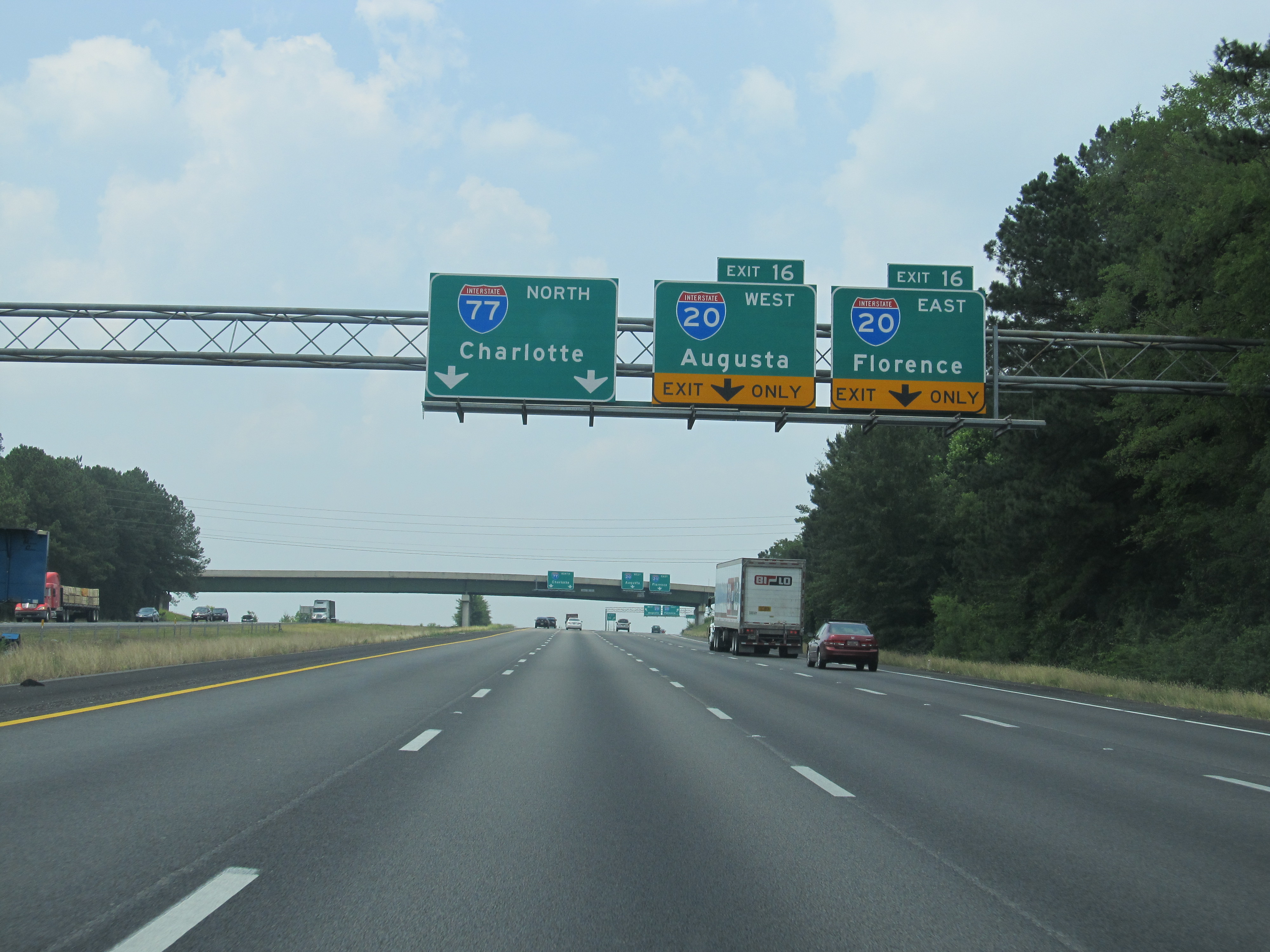
I-77 approaching its interchange with I-20 past Fort Jackson in Columbia

I-20 narrows back to six lanes as it crosses the Broad River. I-20 passes north of Columbia to meet its next interchange with SC 215 (Monticello Road), which goes northward to the city of Jenkinsville. Then a mile later, I-20 meets an interchange of US 321 (Fairfield Road), which goes northward to the city of Winnsboro. US 321 links I-20, northward to Gastonia, North Carolina. I-20 continues for another mile to meet an interchange with US 21 (North Main Street). US 21 serves as a parallel route for I-77, north of Columbia. I-20 meets two interchanges with SC 555 (Farrow Road) before immediately meeting SC 277. SC 277 northbound connects to I-77 northbound toward Charlotte, North Carolina. I-20 soon meets its third and final interchange with US 1 (Two Notch Road). From here, US 1 remains paralleling north of I-20 until passing Camden. I-20 crosses over an unnamed lake before meeting interchanges with I-77 and Alpine Road. I-77 south goes back to I-26 since I-77, I-26, and I-20 altogether serve as a beltway loop around Columbia. I-20 eastbound has no direct exit to I-77 northbound, so drivers on I-20 east must use the Alpine Road exit as a u-turn method to get on I-77 north.

After its interchanges with I-77 and Alpine Road, I-20 leaves the city limits of Columbia as it passes through the north of Fort Jackson while beginning to parallel north of SC 12 (Percival Road). I-20 meets the interchanges with Clemson Road and Spears Creek Church Road, south of Pontiac before narrowing back to four lanes. It later meets an interchange with White Pond Road, that connects to the small town of Elgin before reaching Luggoff.

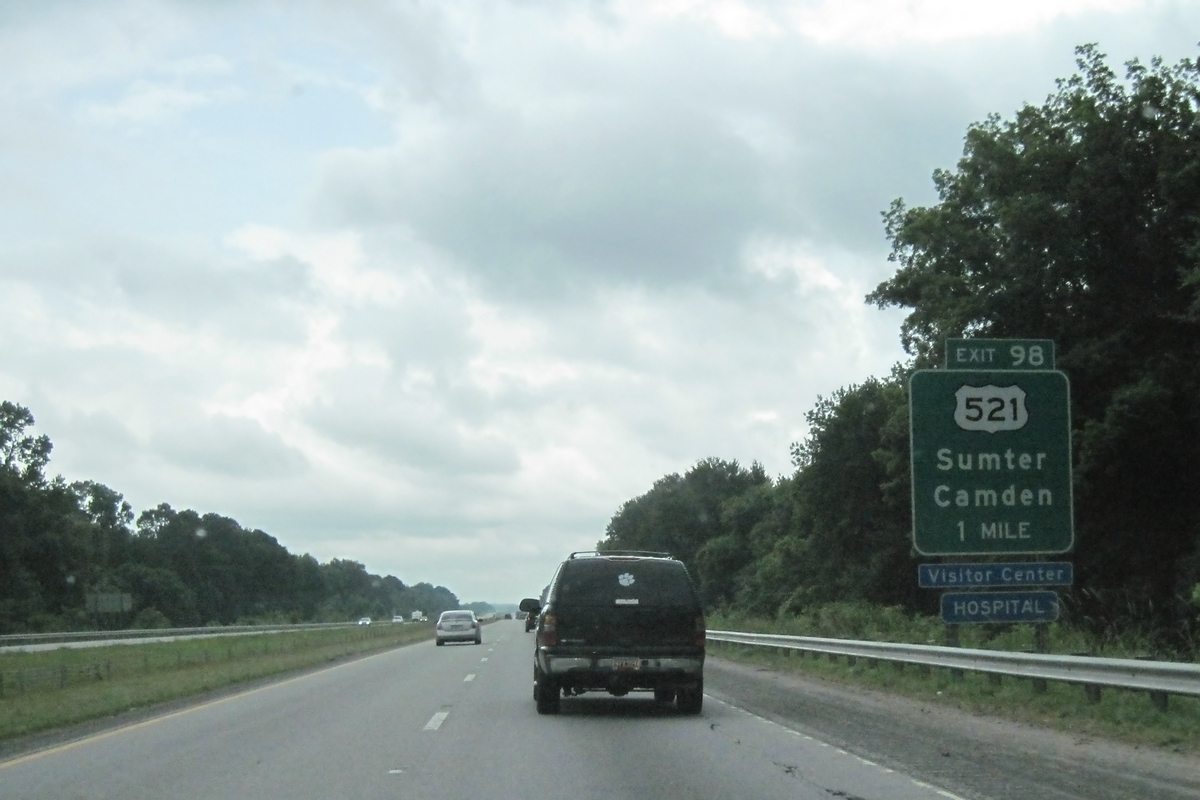
I-20 approaching to US 521 as it enters Camden

In Luggoff, I-20 meets an interchange with US 601 and eastern terminus of SC 12 before a mile later passing with access to the rest area. I-20 curves to the east as it crosses over Buck Creek and the Wateree River before meeting an interchange with US 521 in Camden. US 521 provides access to Sumter. Shorty after this interchange and passing Camden, US 1 stops paralleling I-20 as it goes to its own way to northeast through the Sandhills region toward Rockingham, North Carolina.

I-20 passes the small town of Antioch. As SC 34 gets closer to the route, I-20 meets an interchange with Jamestown Road; a connector road to SC 34, and to the town of Manville. SC 34 goes further away from I-20 as it goes toward Bishopville. I-20 passes the town of Browntown before meeting the interchanges of US 15, and then SC 341 near Bishopville, which both routes go northward to. I-20 cross below SC 154 without an interchange between both of its interchanges with US 15 and SC 341. South of I-20, US 15 goes southwest as another way to go to Sumter while SC 341 goes southeast toward Lynchburg. I-20 crosses over the Lynches River through the marshes as it passes south of the Lee State Park before meeting an interchange with Lee State Park Road, that connects to the state park entrance.

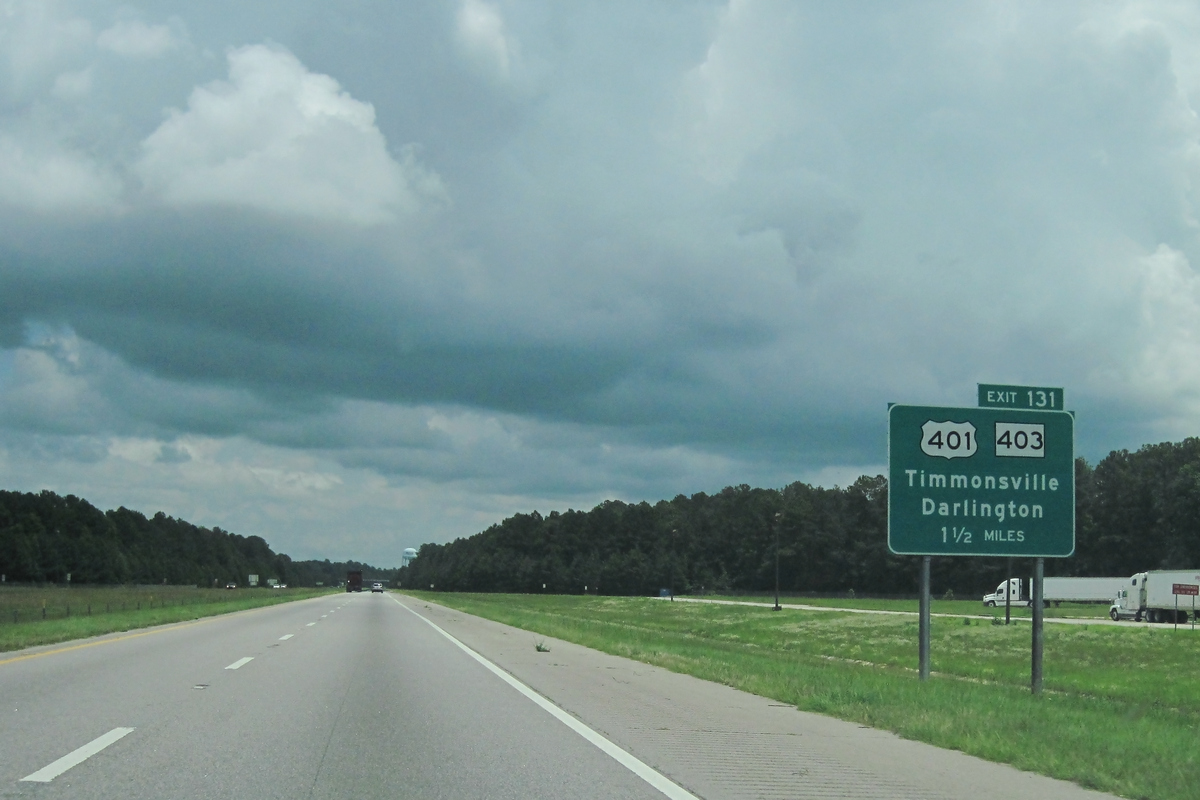
I-20 approaching to US 401 and SC 403 near Lamar

I-20 continues passing with access to a parking area for commercial vehicles only. Then crossing over SC 403 without an interchange before meeting an interchange with US 401 near Lamar, that connects to SC 403 and the cities of Timmonsville (via SC 403 south), Darlington, and also goes to Sumter. I-20 later meets an interchange with SC 340 that also goes to Timmonsville and Darlington. I-20 continues its final four miles (6.4 km) passing south of Darlington before reaching Florence.

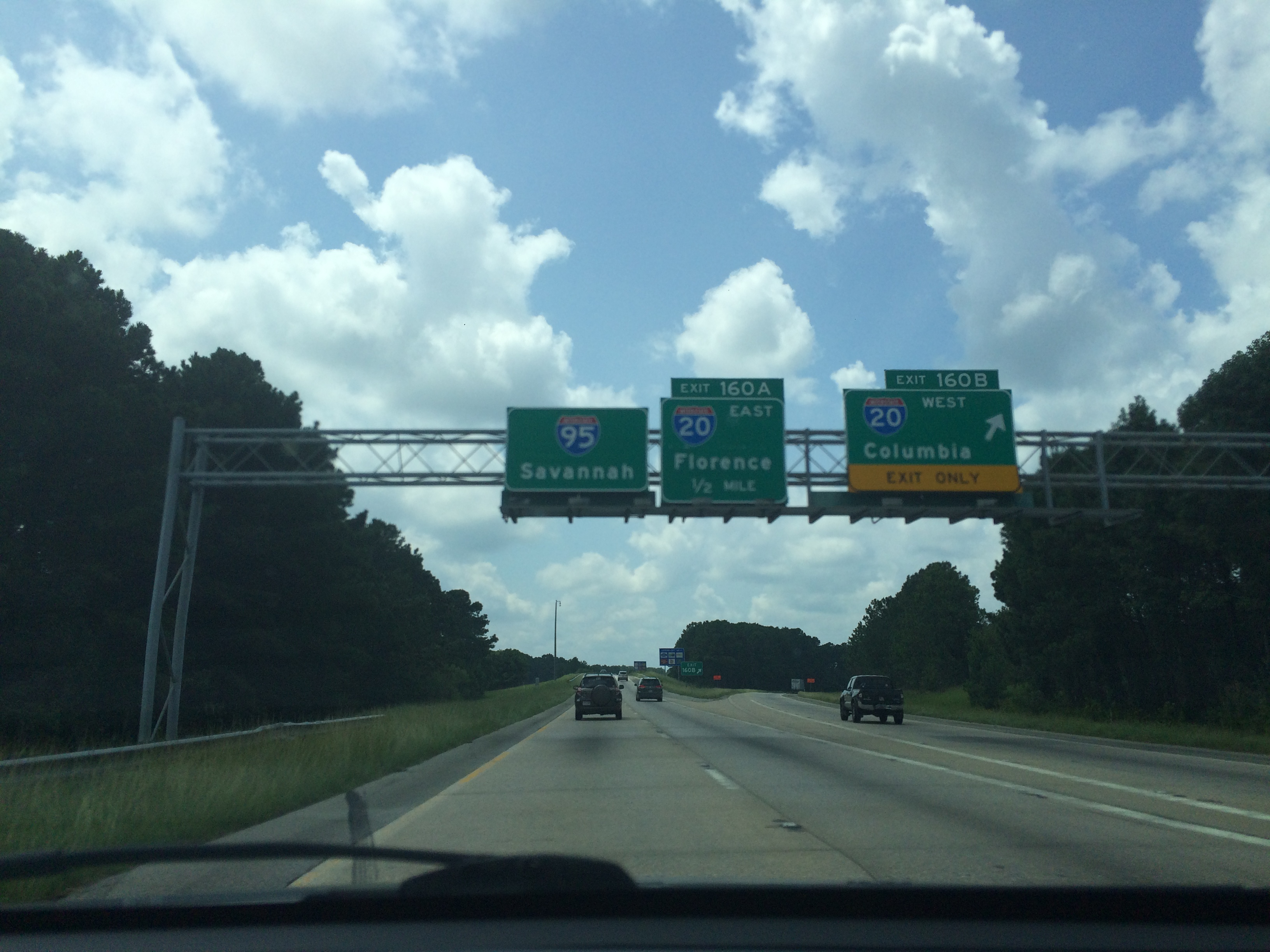
Approaching the eastern end of I-20 on I-95 south in Florence; I-95’s right exit lane becomes the western beginning of I-20’s main travel lanes; exit 160A of I-95’s erroneous signage of I-20 Bus. was corrected in 2025

As I-20 approaches towards the city of Florence, it meets its eastern terminus at an interchange with I-95. At this interchange, the main travel lanes of I-20 defaults to exit left on exit 141A to merge onto the lanes of I-95 north toward Fayetteville, North Carolina. After passing exit 141A, I-20’s right exit 141B to I-95 south goes southwest from Florence towards Savannah, Georgia. But in 2025, SCDOT moved I-20 eastbound’s mile maker 141 sign to the left exit ramp of exit 141A, and changed I-20 eastbound’s exit 141A sign with the arrow pointing left to the exit 141B sign with the arrow pointing right. Treating it as if I-20 now continues past the I-95 south (along with I-20 Bus. east) exit before curving northeast to meet its eastern terminus when its lanes merges onto I-95’s northbound lanes. SC 327 (along with US 76, SC 576, and US 501) serves a connection to Myrtle Beach from I-20’s eastern terminus via I-95 north. Beyond this interchange, the roadway continues for two miles (3.2 km) towards downtown Florence as I-20 Bus. eastbound (David H. McLeod Boulevard east).

=== Services ===
The South Carolina Department of Transportation (SCDOT) operates and maintains one welcome center and two rest areas along I-20. The welcome center, which has a travel information facility on site, is located in North Augusta at milemarker 0.5 (eastbound), and the rest areas are located in Lugoff at milemarker 99 (east and westbound) between exit 92 (U.S. Route 601 [US 601] and SC 12) and the bridges over the Wateree River. Common at all locations are public restrooms, public telephones, vending machines, picnic area, and barbecue grills. A pair of closed rest areas exist between exits 44 and 51.

The South Carolina Department of Public Safety and State Transport Police operate and maintain two truck inspection/weigh stations. The eastbound truck weigh station can be found in Jones Crossroads at milemarker 35, and the westbound weigh station can be found in Lexington at milemarker 53.5.

== History ==
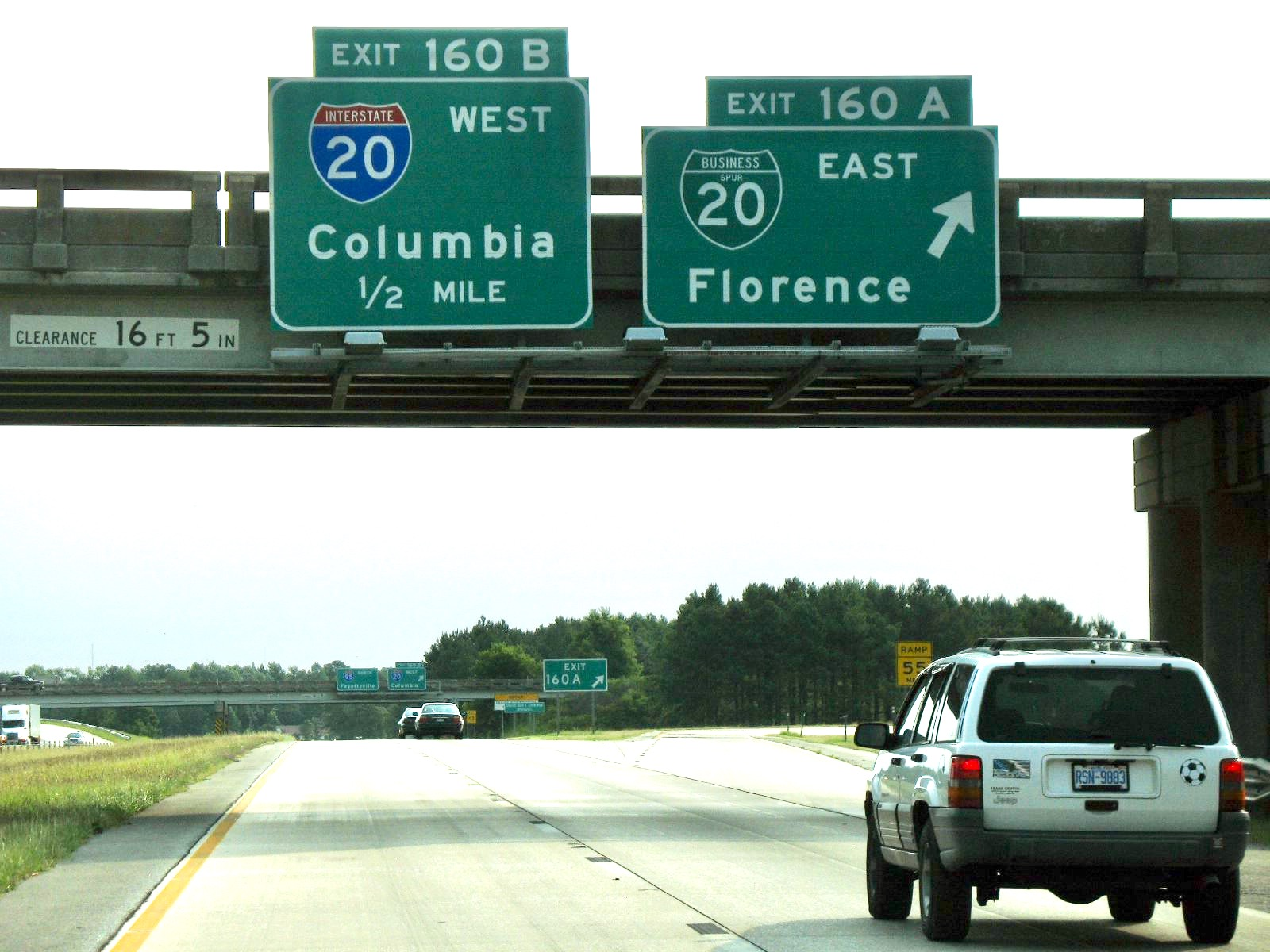
Approaching the eastern end of I-20 on I-95 north in Florence

I-20 first appeared between 1964 and 1967; its first section was completed from SC 6, south of Lexington, to Spears Creek Church Road (S-40-53), south of Pontiac. A second section, from the Georgia state line to US 25/SC 121, was completed in 1967. In 1968 or 1969, I-20 was extended east from Spears Creek Church Road (S-40-53) to US 601/SC 12, south of Camden. In 1971, I-20 combined the two segments by completing the gap between US 25/SC 121 to SC 6. In 1973, I-20 was extended east to US 521. In 1974, it extended east again to US 15. In 1975, another extension east to US 401 with the final section between SC 340 and I-20 Bus. opening in August 1975. And finally, in 1976, I-20 reached its destination with I-95 and the city of Florence. Also in the same year, exit numbers were installed.

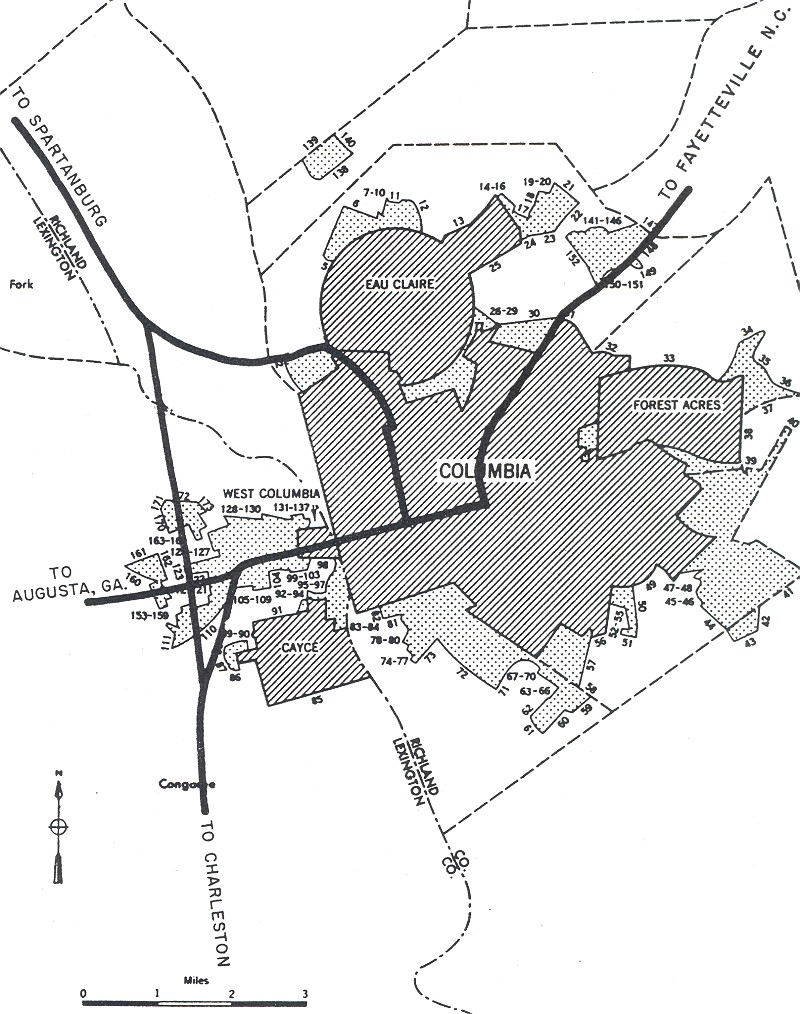
I-20 was originally planned in September 1955 to go through downtown Columbia instead of bypassing the city to the north as it currently does to this day

In the late 1980s, I-20 in Columbia was widened to six lanes from the east of US 378 (exit 61) to the east of I-77 (exit 76). In 2014, I-20 was widened again to six lanes eastward from I-77 (exit 76) to the east of Spears Creek Church Road (exit 82), south of Pontiac. In 2022, I-20 was widened to six lanes for the third time westward from the east of US 378 (exit 61) to the west of Longs Pond Road (exit 51), south of Gilbert. In 2025, I-20 is planned to be widened to six lanes in the Augusta CSRA area, from the west of Georgia State Route 104 (GA exit 200) in Augusta, Georgia to SC 230 (exit 1) in North Augusta. This widening project represents the first bistate agreement between the Georgia Department of Transportation (GDOT) and SCDOT for their design–build project in the Augusta CSRA area.

=== Proposed extensions ===
==== Myrtle Beach extension ====
The first proposal to extend I-20 was at the time of its designation in the state, and consisted of plans to extend it east from Florence to Myrtle Beach. However, because Myrtle Beach was not yet the tourist destination it later became, the state eventually widened US 76 and US 501 into a four-lane divided highways and established SC 576 connecting the two routes in the 1970s. In 1992, the state widened SC 327 from US 76/US 301 to I-95 exit 170, which is 10 miles away from I-20’s eastern end at I-95 exit 160. In 2003, the state widened I-95 to six lanes from I-20 to SC 327 throughout Florence to better improve the beach traffic flow.

==== Wilimington extension ====
In 2003, North Carolina Governor Mike Easley pushed forward a proposal to extend I-20 eastward from Florence to Wilmington, which became part of the North Carolina Department of Transportation's (NCDOT’s) strategic transportation plan. The proposed routing would overlap I-20 along I-95 to the I-74/US 74 interchange, then travel east (concurrently with US 74) into Wilmington. In 2005, this proposal became part of the SAFETEA-LU transportation legislation, and North Carolina received $5 million for a feasibility study for this extension.

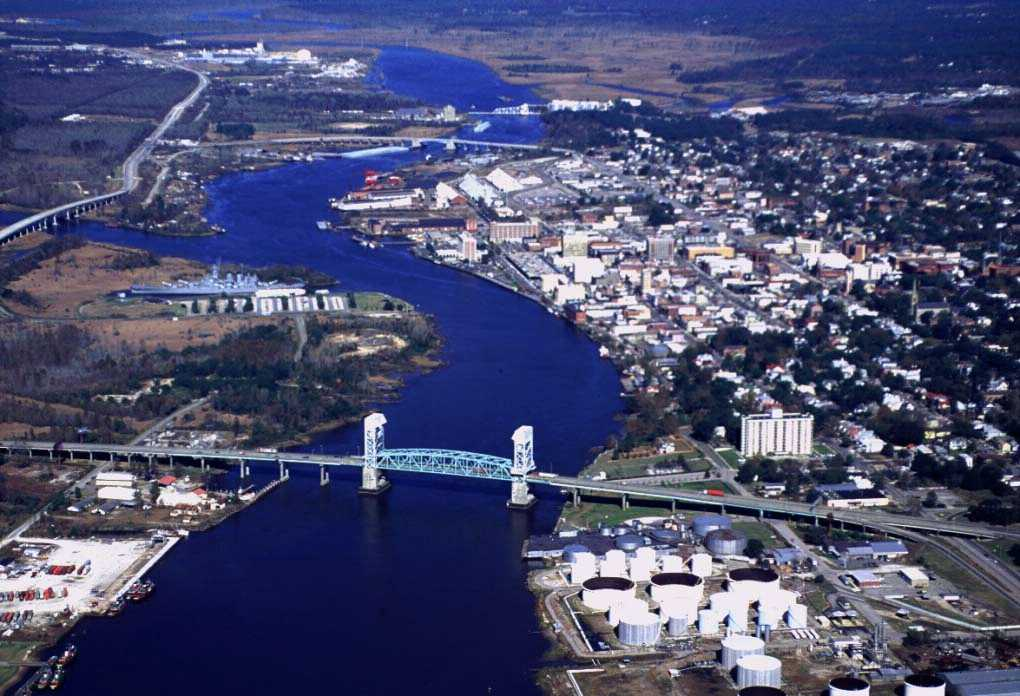
The view of the Cape Fear Memorial Bridge crossing the Cape Fear River, the east of it is where I-20 meets its future eastern terminus if it gets extended to Wilmington, while the roadway continues as US 17 northbound, US 76 eastbound, and US 421 southbound toward downtown of the city

If the extension was built, I-20 will have a concurrency with I-95 about 12 miles (19 km) throughout Florence. Due to much of the development in Florence area, I-20 won’t be able to go through the town. East of the Pee Dee River where the I-95 concurrency ends, I-20 follows the US 76 corridor to meet I-73 near Marion. Then passes Mullins and Nichols before entering North Carolina. After entering the state and passing Flair Bluff, Cerro Gordo, and Chadbourn; I-20 will have concurrency with a I-74 about 20 miles (32 km) from Whiteville to east of its future interchange with North Carolina Highway 211 (NC 211). And have future interchanges with I-140/US 17/US 74 east/US 421/NC 133 in Wilmington where I-20 will terminate after crossing over the Cape Fear River on the Cape Fear Memorial Bridge, where US 17/US 76/US 421 enters at-grade intersection streets of downtown Wilmington. However, it will not have a direct interchange with I-40 in Wilmington for this extension. Access to I-40 from I-20 is via I-140.

The extension of I-20 to Wilmington has considerable support among towns in southeastern North Carolina due to the justification that a direct route from Atlanta to the Port of Wilmington could be a boom to the economy. However, the SCDOT has stated that they have no interest in upgrading their portion of US 76 to an Interstate. Instead, South Carolina is focusing on plans to build I-73 (and possibly I-74) that will terminate near Myrtle Beach. In 2009, soon after Governor Mike Easley left office, the proposed routing was removed from all NCDOT plans and was officially dropped. The proposal was never officially discussed with SCDOT nor submitted to the American Association of State Highway and Transportation Officials (AASHTO) and the Federal Highway Administration (FHWA) for consideration.

== Future ==
=== I-26/I-126 interchange ===
SCDOT, in cooperation with the FHWA, is proposing improvements to a corridor along I-20, I-26, and I-126, including the system interchanges at I-20/I-26 and I-26/I-126 in Lexington and Richland counties. These improvements are proposed to increase mobility and enhance traffic operations by reducing existing traffic congestion within the corridor, while accommodating future traffic needs. The corridor's approximately 14 miles (23 km) of mainline Interstate include I-26 from exit 101 (Broad River Road, US 176) to east of the Saluda River, I-20 from the west of the Saluda River to west of the Broad River, and I-126 from I-26 to east of the interchange with Colonial Life Boulevard.

== Exit list ==
County	Location	mi	km	Exit	Destinations	Notes
Aiken	North Augusta	0.0	0.0		I-20 west (SR 402) – Atlanta	Continuation into Georgia
Aiken	North Augusta	1.2	1.9	1	SC 230 – North Augusta	
Aiken	North Augusta	4.9	7.9	5	US 25 / SC 121 – Edgefield, Johnston	
Aiken	North Augusta	5.6	9.0	6	I-520 west (Palmetto Parkway) – North Augusta, Augusta	Eastern terminus of I-520 and Palmetto Parkway
Aiken		11.1	17.9	11	Bettis Academy Road – Graniteville	
Aiken	Aiken	17.7	28.5	18	SC 19 – Aiken, Johnston, Edgefield	
Aiken	Aiken	21.9	35.2	22	US 1 – Aiken, Ridge Spring	
Aiken		29.3	47.2	29	Wire Road	
Aiken		32.4	52.1	33	SC 39 – Wagener, Monetta, Ridge Spring	
Lexington		38.7	62.3	39	US 178 – Pelion, Batesburg-Leesville	
Lexington		44.1	71.0	44	Road 34 – Gilbert	Also named as Pond Branch Road
Lexington		50.8	81.8	51	Longs Pond Road	
Lexington	Lexington	54.8	88.2	55	SC 6 – Swansea, Pelion, Lexington	Signed as exits 55A (east) and 55B (west) westbound
Lexington	Lexington	57.5	92.5	58	US 1 – Lexington, West Columbia	To Columbia Airport
Lexington	Lexington	61.1	98.3	61	US 378 – West Columbia, Lexington	
Richland	Columbia	63.2	101.7	63	Bush River Road	
Richland	Columbia	64.0	103.0	64	I-26 (US 76 / James F. Byrnes Memorial Freeway) – Spartanburg, Columbia, Charleston	Signed as exits 64A (east) and 64B (west); I-26/US 76 exit 107
Richland	Columbia	65.0	104.6	65	US 176 (Broad River Road) – Columbia, Irmo	Diverging diamond interchange
Richland	Columbia	68.2	109.8	68	SC 215 (Monticello Road) – Jenkinsville	
Richland	Columbia	69.6	112.0	70	US 321 (Fairfield Road) – Winnsboro	
Richland	Columbia	71.0	114.3	71	US 21 (North Main Street)	
Richland	Columbia	72.1	116.0	72	SC 555 (Farrow Road)	
Richland	Columbia	72.7	117.0	73	SC 277 to I-77 north – Columbia, Charlotte	I-20 westbound has no access to SC 277 northbound; SC 277 southbound has no access to I-20 eastbound; signed as exits 73A (south) and 73B (north)
Richland	Columbia	73.9	118.9	74	US 1 (Two Notch Road)	
Richland	Columbia	75.5	121.5	76	I-77 / Alpine Road – Charleston, Charlotte	Signed as exits 76A (I-77) and exit 76B (Alpine Road) westbound; I-77 exit 16; I-20 eastbound has no direct access to I-77 northbound; eastbound exit Alpine Road to I-77 north; to Columbia Airport via I-77 south
Richland		79.8	128.4	80	Clemson Road	
Richland		81.5	131.2	82	Spears Creek Church Road – Pontiac	
Kershaw		86.7	139.5	87	White Pond Road – Elgin	
Kershaw	Lugoff	91.5	147.3	92	US 601 (SC 12 west) – Lugoff, Camden, St. Matthews	Eastern terminus of SC 12
Kershaw	Camden	97.5	156.9	98	US 521 – Camden, Sumter, Rembert	To Camden Military Academy
Kershaw		101.2	162.9	101	Dr. Humphries Road	Formerly named as Road 329
Lee		107.5	173.0	108	Jamestown Road – Manville	
Lee	Bishopville	115.8	186.4	116	US 15 – Sumter, Bishopville	
Lee	Bishopville	119.7	192.6	120	SC 341 – Bishopville, Lynchburg, Elliott	
Lee		122.4	197.0	123	Lee State Park Road – Lamar	Formerly named as Road 22, to Lee State Park
Darlington		130.6	210.2	131	US 401 to SC 403 – Timmonsville, Darlington, Hartsville, Sumter	
Darlington		137.0	220.5	137	SC 340 – Darlington, Timmonsville	
Florence	Florence	141.2– 141.5	227.2– 227.7	141	I-95 – Fayetteville, Savannah I-20 BS east (David H. McLeod Boulevard east) – Florence	Eastern terminus of I-20; signed as exits 141A (north) and 141B (south); I-95 exit 160; to Myrtle Beach via I-95 north; roadway continues as I-20 BS eastbound
1.000 mi = 1.609 km; 1.000 km = 0.621 mi: Incomplete access

== Related routes ==
I-20 has one business route and one auxiliary route in the state of South Carolina. I-520 is a 23.34-mile-long (37.56 km) auxiliary highway from Augusta, Georgia, to North Augusta, South Carolina.

=== Florence business spur ===
Interstate 20 Business
- David H. McLeod Boulevard
- Location: Florence
- Length: 2.244 mi (3.611 km)
- Existed: 1970–present

Interstate 20 Business (I-20 Bus., Bus. 20, BS 20, or Bus. 20 Spur) is a business spur of I-20 in Florence. The route follows David H. McLeod Boulevard for 2.244 miles (3.611 km), from the eastern terminus of I-20 at I-95, eastward to U.S. Route 76 (US 76; West Palmetto Street). Its entire length is part of the National Highway System (NHS). It is also one of the two well-signed business spurs in the state, along with I-526 Bus. in Mount Pleasant.

Route description

I-20 Bus. begins at the interchange where I-20 meets its eastern terminus at I-95 exit 160, on the western edge of Florence. It travels east as a 45 mph (72 km/h) divided urban arterial through a major commercial corridor. It meets its first intersection of West Radio Drive. Its northbound of the roadway takes the drivers to the southern terminus of Dumbarton Drive, before making its entrance to the Magnolia Mall. Its southbound of the roadway provides access to retail areas, hotels, and the Florence Center district. West Radio Drive connects south to South Ebenezer Road; which goes west, northwest, and then going northward; while crossing the bridges above I-95 and I-20, without the direct interchange; toward US 52 near Darlington. I-20 Bus. later intersects with Frontage Road where it widens to six lanes temporarily. The Frontage Road begins southwest of the intersection at West Radio Drive. It parallels south of I-20 Bus. going eastward serving more shops, restaurants, hotels, and a gas station; before turning northward at the route. Beyond I-20 Bus., the Frontage Road becomes another entrance road to the Magnolia Mall. The third right lane on westbound I-20 Bus., west of this intersection, used to be an exit lane for its former interchange to Dumbarton Drive. The off-ramp from westbound I-20 Bus. to Dumbarton Drive was removed in 2018, for more room in development to the mall area.

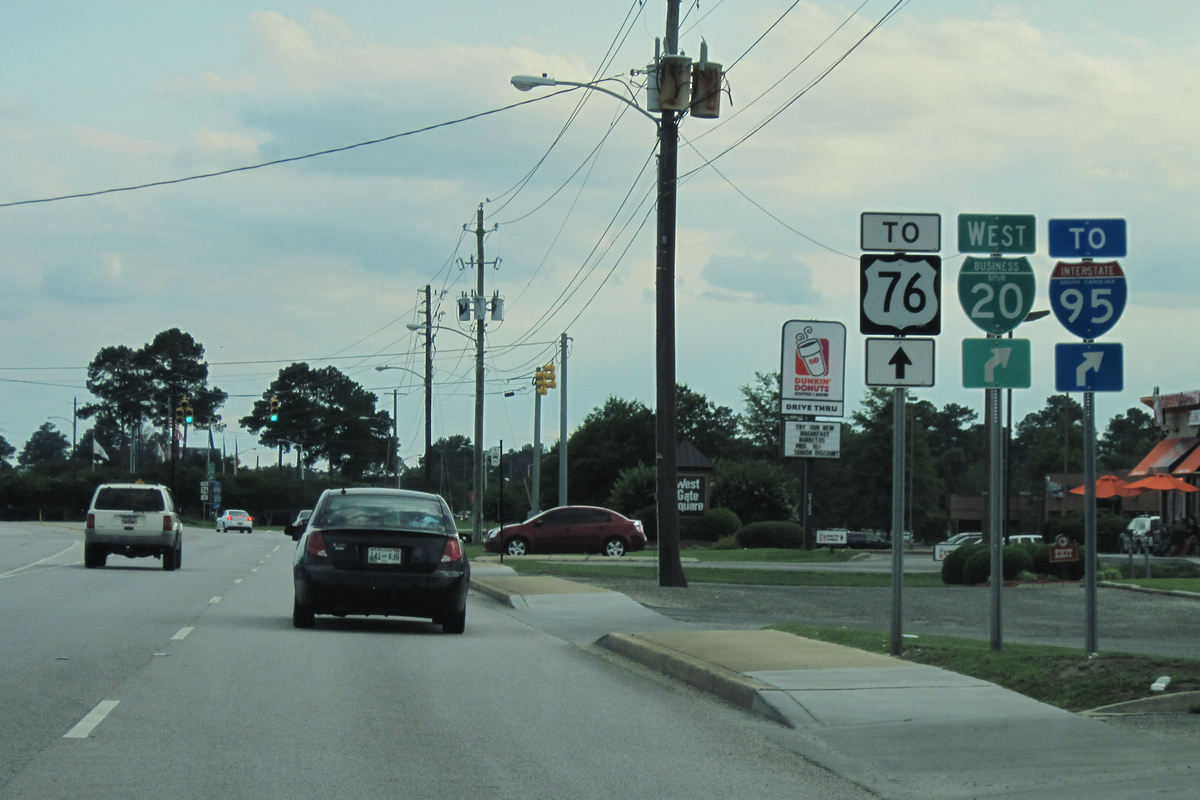
West Evans Street going southward from downtown Florence towards the western beginning of I-20 Bus., before reaching a few blocks to US 76 and the southern beginning of SC 51

I-20 Bus. crosses above the Beaverdam Creek to an intersection with southern terminus of North Beltline Drive and the northern terminus of Woody Jones Boulevard. At this intersection, the roadway narrows back to four lanes as it crosses the bridge above the Florence Rail Trail. It later meets an intersection with the southern terminus of Doizer Boulevard and the northern terminus of Bentree Lane, which along Holly Circle provides a short cut way south to US 76 and South Carolina Highway 51 (SC 51). The median narrows and the speed limit drops to 40 mph (64 km/h), before meeting West Evans Street by the Florence Mall. SCDOT identifies West Evans Street as the eastern terminus of I-20 Bus. and the western terminus of the unsigned US 76 Connnector (US 76 Conn.), which the roadway continues as. However, signage for I-20 Bus. continues east along David H. McLeod Boulevard to US 76 (West Palmetto Street).

History

David H. McLeod Boulevard was constructed in the late 1960s during development of I-20 through the Florence area. I-20 Bus. was later established to provide direct access between the Interstate Highway System and Florence's commercial districts. The construction began by 1969 and completed in 1970. It has remained unchanged since inception. The route is named for David H. McLeod, a former mayor of Florence who supported local development initiatives and civic projects in the mid-20th century, including efforts related to the founding era of Francis Marion University. Roadway changes near Magnolia Mall and Dumbarton Drive accompanied redevelopment and new retail construction along the boulevard. The off-ramp from I-20 Bus. to Dumbarton Drive was removed in 2018.

Major intersections
The entire route is in Florence, Florence County.

mi	km	Destinations	Notes
0.000	0.000	I-20 west (J. Strom Thurmond Freeway west) – Columbia; I-95 – Fayetteville, Savannah	Interchange; western terminus of I-20 Bus.; signed as exits 141A (north) and 141B (south) using I-20 exit numbering; I-95 exit 160; roadway continues as I-20 westbound
0.800	1.287	Dumbarton Drive north	Interchange; former westbound exit, removed in 2018
2.110	3.396	West Evans Street to US 76 west / SC 51 south – Timmonsville, Downtown Florence	SCDOT marks this intersection as the eastern terminus of I-20 Bus. and the western terminus of unsigned US 76 Conn.
2.244	3.611	US 76 (West Palmetto Street) – Timmonsville, Florence, Myrtle Beach	Official signed eastern terminus of I-20 Bus.; SCDOT marks this intersection as the eastern terminus of unsigned US 76 Conn.; to the Florence Regional Airport and Francis Marion University via US 76 east
1.000 mi = 1.609 km; 1.000 km = 0.621 mi: Closed/former

== See also ==
- Central Savannah River Area

Interstate 20
Previous state: Georgia	South Carolina	Next state: Terminus
