= South Carolina Highway 764 =

State highway in South Carolina, United States

South Carolina Highway 764

Route information
- Maintained by SCDOT
- Length: 8.950 mi (14.404 km)

Major junctions
- West end: US 76 / US 378 near Horrell Hill
- SC 263 in Eastover
- East end: US 601 near Eastover

Location
- Country: United States
- State: South Carolina
- Counties: Richland

Highway system
- South Carolina State Highway System; Interstate; US; State; Scenic
← SC 763	→ SC 768

South Carolina Highway 764 (SC 764) is a 8.950-mile-long (14.404 km) primary state highway in the U.S. state of South Carolina. The highway connects rural areas of Richland County with Eastover.

== Route description ==
SC 764 begins at an intersection with U.S. Route 76 (US 76) and US 378 (Garners Ferry Road), northeast of McEntire Joint National Guard Base, and east-southeast of Horrell Hill, within Richland County. It travels to the southeast and crosses over Toms Creek. It curves to the south-southeast and crosses Ray Branch. The highway curves back to the southeast and begins paralleling railroad tracks; then, it enters Eastover. In town, it passes a U.S. Post Office before intersecting the southern terminus of SC 263 (Vanboklen Street). The highway crosses over Griffins Creek and leaves town. SC 764 continues traveling through rural areas of the county and curves to the east-northeast, where it no longer parallels the railroad tracks mentioned above. A very short distance later, it meets its eastern terminus, an intersection with US 601 (McCords Ferry Road). Here, the roadway continues as an access road to Kensington Mansion.

== Major intersections ==
The entire route is in Richland County.

Location	mi	km	Destinations	Notes
	0.000	0.000	US 76 / US 378 (Garners Ferry Road) – Columbia, Sumter	Western terminus
Eastover	7.020	11.298	SC 263 north (Vanboklen Street) – Sumter, Camden	Southern terminus of SC 263
	8.950	14.404	US 601 (McCords Ferry Road) – Orangeburg, Camden	Eastern terminus
1.000 mi = 1.609 km; 1.000 km = 0.621 mi
