= South Carolina Highway 262 =

State highway in South Carolina, United States

South Carolina Highway 262
- Leesburg Road

Route information
- Maintained by SCDOT
- Length: 14.750 mi (23.738 km)
- Existed: 1940–present

Major junctions
- West end: US 76 / US 378 in Columbia
- I-77 in Columbia
- East end: US 601 in Leesburg

Location
- Country: United States
- State: South Carolina
- Counties: Richland

Highway system
- South Carolina State Highway System; Interstate; US; State; Scenic
← SC 261	→ SC 263

South Carolina Highway 262 (SC 262) is a 14.750-mile (23.738 km) primary state highway in the U.S. state of South Carolina. It serves primarily as the southern border of Fort Jackson.

== Route description ==
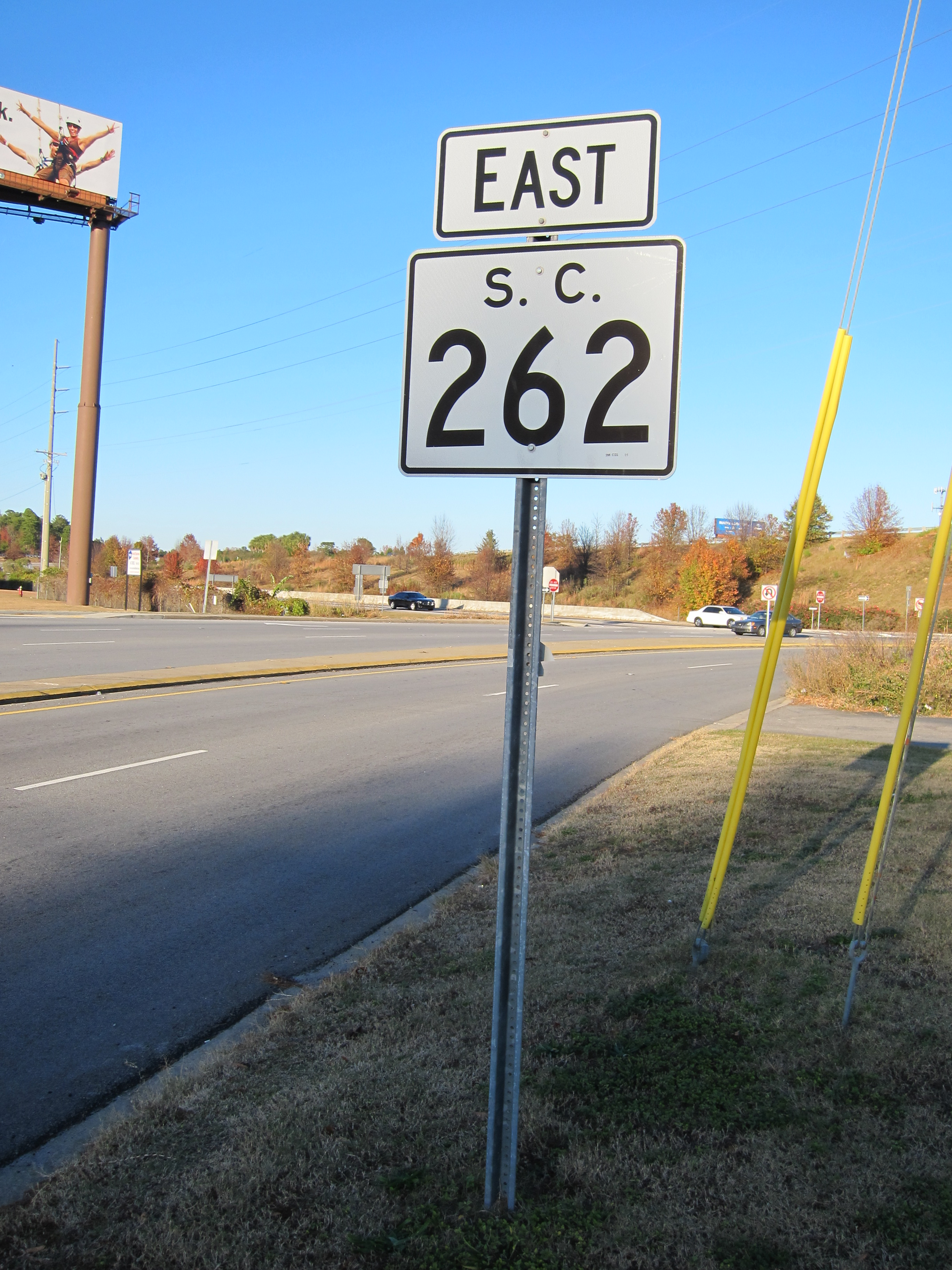
First sign for SC 262 east in Columbia (using the older style shield)

Starting from Garners Ferry Road, U.S. Route 76 (US 76) and US 378, it connects with Interstate 77 (I-77) before continuing as a 4 lane road until Fairmont Rd (S-88) then continues as a two lane road to US 601.

== History ==
Established in 1937 or 1938 as a new primary route going east, it started off as a seven miles (11 km) paved stub road, going east from US 76. In 1940, it was extended along a dirt road to US 601; which was later paved by 1942. In 1948, it was briefly decommissioned, but reinstated a year later. Since its inception, it has served as the southern boundary for Fort Jackson for its entire length.

== Junction list ==
The entire route is in Richland County.

Location	mi	km	Destinations	Notes
Columbia	0.000	0.000	US 76 / US 378 (Garners Ferry Road) – Sumter, Columbia	Western terminus
Columbia	0.120– 0.150	0.193– 0.241	I-77 – Charleston, Charlotte	Access to I-77 southbound via US 76/US 378; I-77 exit 9B
Leesburg	14.750	23.738	US 601 (McCords Ferry Road) – St. Matthews, Orangeburg, Camden	Eastern terminus
1.000 mi = 1.609 km; 1.000 km = 0.621 mi: Incomplete access
