= South Carolina Highway 12 =

State highway in South Carolina

South Carolina Highway 12

Route information
- Maintained by SCDOT
- Length: 28.250 mi (45.464 km)
- Existed: 1940–present

Major junctions
- West end: US 1 in West Columbia
- US 378 in West Columbia; US 21 / US 176 / US 321 in Columbia; US 76 in Columbia; US 1 in Columbia; I-77 in Columbia
- East end: I-20 / US 601 near Lugoff

Location
- Country: United States
- State: South Carolina
- Counties: Lexington, Richland, Kershaw

Highway system
- South Carolina State Highway System; Interstate; US; State; Scenic
← SC 11	→ SC 14

South Carolina Highway 12 (SC 12) is a 28.250-mile (45.464 km) state highway in the U.S. state of South Carolina. It serves Columbia and areas to its east. It serves as a parallel route to Interstate 20 (I-20) for much of its length.

== Route description ==
The route begins as a four-lane highway, splitting from U.S. Highway 1 (US 1) where it is known as Jarvis Klapman Boulevard. Through West Columbia, the highway has a mix of at-grade intersections (including one at SC 35) and interchanges (with 9th Street and US 378). It crosses the Congaree River on the Jefferson Davis McMahan Bridge headed into downtown Columbia. For a 0.6-mile (0.97 km) stretch in Columbia, the highway splits into a one way pair separated by a city block: Hampton Street and Park Street for eastbound traffic, and Taylor Street and Williams Street for westbound traffic. Continuing east, the route keeps the name Taylor Street. After its intersection with US 1, the road changes its name to Forest Drive as it passes through Forest Acres.

After a sharp turn at the unsigned Spur SC 12, the road is known as Percival Road, then Fort Jackson Road. North and east of downtown Columbia, the route runs next to Fort Jackson and parallel to I-77 then I-20. The route traverses through rural land before reaching its terminus at US 601 at I-20's exit 92.

== History ==
=== Previous designations ===
There have been two previous versions of SC 12. The first version ran from the 5th Street Bridge at the Georgia-South Carolina state line near Augusta, Georgia, to Aiken, Leesville, and Lexington, South Carolina before ending in West Columbia. Today, this route is marked as US 1 from the state line to West Columbia, which was assigned the route in 1927. SC 12 was dropped from the route in 1928, the year afterwards.

The second former route of SC 12 was established between 1928 and 1931. The route ran from what is now US 521 between Lancaster and Fort Mill for two miles (3.2 km) to the North Carolina state line near Waxhaw, North Carolina, at what was then NC 25. In 1934, North Carolina changed NC 25 to NC 75, and South Carolina renumbered SC 12 to SC 75 four years later, in 1938.

== Major intersections ==
County	Location	mi	km	Destinations	Notes
Lexington	West Columbia	0.000	0.000	US 1 (Augusta Road) to I-26 – Lexington	No access from SC 12 west to US 1 north; western terminus
Lexington	West Columbia	1.380	2.221	SC 35 (12th Street) to US 378 – Cayce	
Lexington	West Columbia	1.740	2.800	9th Street (SC 12 Conn.)	Interchange
Lexington	West Columbia	2.285	3.677	US 378 (Sunset Boulevard) – Lexington	Eastbound entrance and westbound exit only; interchange
Richland	Columbia	3.110	5.005	US 21 / US 176 / US 321 (Huger Street) to I-126	
Richland	Columbia	3.790	6.099	SC 48 (Assembly Street)	
Richland	Columbia	4.190	6.743	US 76 (Bull Street)	
Richland	Columbia	4.780	7.693	SC 555 north (Harden Street)	Southern terminus of SC 555
Richland	Columbia	5.120	8.240	US 1 (Two Notch Road)	
Richland	Forest Acres	6.760	10.879	SC 16 (North Beltline Boulevard)	
Richland	Columbia	8.890	14.307	Forest Drive east (SC 12 Spur east) to I-77 – Fort Jackson	Western terminus of SC 12 Spur, which takes on the Forest Drive name.
Richland	Columbia–Woodfield line	10.700	17.220	I-77 south / Decker Boulevard – Charleston	Northbound I-77 exit and southbound I-77 entrance only; I-77 exit 13
Richland	Columbia–Woodfield line	11.770	18.942	I-77 – Charleston, Charlotte	I-77 exit 15
Kershaw	Lugoff	28.250	45.464	US 601 / I-20 – St. Matthews, Camden, Florence, Columbia	Eastern terminus; I-20 exit 92
1.000 mi = 1.609 km; 1.000 km = 0.621 mi: Incomplete access

== Special routes ==
=== West Columbia connector route ===
South Carolina Highway 12 Connector
- Location: West Columbia
- Length: 0.450 mi (724 m)

South Carolina Highway 12 Connector (SC 12 Conn.) follows 9th Street in West Columbia from U.S. Route 1 (US 1; Meeting Street) to US 378 (Sunset Boulevard). It is 0.450 miles (0.724 km) long and has an interchange with SC 12 at its midpoint.

The entire route is in West Columbia, Lexington County.

mi	km	Destinations	Notes
0.000	0.000	US 1 (Meeting Street)	Southern terminus; 9th Street continues past intersection.
0.278– 0.280	0.447– 0.451	SC 12 – Lexington, Columbia	Interchange
0.450	0.724	US 378 (Sunset Boulevard)	Northern terminus of SC 12 Conn. and 9th Street
1.000 mi = 1.609 km; 1.000 km = 0.621 mi

=== Columbia spur route ===
South Carolina Highway 12 Spur
- Location: Columbia
- Length: 0.334 mi (538 m)

South Carolina Highway 12 Spur (SC 12 Spur) is a 0.334-mile (0.538 km) extension of Forest Drive from SC 12 to an interchange with Interstate 77 (I-77) at its exit 12. Past I-77, the road name becomes Strom Thurmond Boulevard and ends at Fort Jackson's Gate 2.

The entire route is in Columbia, Richland County.

mi	km	Destinations	Notes
0.000	0.000	SC 12 (Forest Drive west / Percival Road north) – Forest Acres	Western terminus; SC 12 takes on the Forest Drive name.
0.312– 0.334	0.502– 0.538	I-77 – Charleston, Charlotte	Eastern terminus; I-77 exit 12
1.000 mi = 1.609 km; 1.000 km = 0.621 mi
