= Red River, South Carolina =

- Unincorporated community
- Location within South Carolina Location within the United States
- Coordinates: 34°57′40″N 80°57′55″W
- Country: United States
- State: South Carolina
- County: York
- Elevation: 548 ft (167 m)
- Time zone: UTC-5 (Eastern (EST))
  - Summer (DST): UTC-4 (EDT)
- Area codes: 803, 839
- GNIS feature ID: 1250314

Red River is an unincorporated community in York County, South Carolina, United States. The community is surrounded by the city of Rock Hill along the Catawba River in the piedmont of South Carolina. It has not yet been annexed into the city of Rock Hill, but in the recent years the area surrounding the community have been annexed, because South Carolina has strict laws on cities annexing the surrounding areas of cities. Red River has an elevation of 548 feet.
