= South Carolina Highway 760 =

State highway in South Carolina, United States

South Carolina Highway 760
- Fort Jackson Boulevard

Route information
- Maintained by SCDOT
- Length: 1.182 mi (1.902 km)

Major junctions
- West end: US 76 / US 378 in Columbia
- I-77 in Columbia
- East end: Crossing of Wildcat Creek in Columbia at Fort Jackson

Location
- Country: United States
- State: South Carolina
- Counties: Richland

Highway system
- South Carolina State Highway System; Interstate; US; State; Scenic
← SC 742	→ SC 763

South Carolina Highway 760 (SC 760) is a 1.182-mile-long (1.902 km) state highway in the U.S. state of South Carolina. The highway travels through eastern Columbia, and connects the main part of the city with Fort Jackson. It is known as Fort Jackson Boulevard for its entire length.

== Route description ==
SC 760 begins at an intersection with U.S. Route 76 (US 76) and US 378 (Devine Street) and the eastern terminus of the central segment of unsigned US 76 Conn. (Cross Hill Road) in Columbia, Richland County. This intersection is just northeast of Midlands Technical College's Beltline Campus. It travels to the east-northeast and crosses over Gills Creek. A short distance later, it intersects the eastern terminus of the unsigned eastern segment of US 76 Conn. (Wildcat Road). Then Reaches an intersection with Kilbourne Rd (S-95). It then meets an interchange with Interstate 77 (I-77; William Earle Berne Beltway). A short distance later, it reaches its eastern terminus, a crossing over Wildcat Creek. Here, the roadway continues as Fort Jackson Boulevard, crosses over Wildcat Creek, and enters Fort Jackson.

== Major intersections ==
The entire route is in Columbia, Richland County.

mi	km	Destinations	Notes
0.000	0.000	US 76 / US 378 (Devine Street) / Cross Hill Road (US 76 Conn. west) – Sumter	Western terminus of SC 760; eastern terminus of the central segment of unsigned US 76 Conn.
0.520	0.837	Wildcat Road (US 76 Conn. west) to US 76 west / US 378 east – Midlands Tech. College, Jim Hamilton L.B. Owens Airport	Eastern terminus of the eastern segment of unsigned US 76 Conn.
1.060– 1.080	1.706– 1.738	I-77 – Charleston, Charlotte	I-77 exit 10
1.182	1.902	Crossing over Wildcat Creek	Eastern terminus
1.000 mi = 1.609 km; 1.000 km = 0.621 mi
