= Pontiac, South Carolina =

Unincorporated community in South Carolina, US

Coordinates: 34.1284842°N 80.8548092°W

Pontiac is an unincorporated community in Richland County, South Carolina, United States.

Pontiac is the location of Pontiac Foods, a coffee, spice, rice and beans plant owned by The Kroger Company. Pontiac Foods has been in Pontiac for over 30 years and employs over 250 full-time associates.

Spring Valley High School and Pontiac Elementary School are located in Pontiac.
