= EdVenture =

- Established: November 8, 2003
- Location: 211 Gervais Street, Columbia, South Carolina, USA
- Coordinates: 33°59′50″N 81°2′53″W
- Type: Children's museum
- Presidents: Andy Marquart, CEO
- Website: www.edventure.org

EdVenture Children’s Museum is a museum and nonprofit educational attraction aimed primarily at children and families. EdVenture features hands-on experiences and interactive spaces designed to encourage learning and creativity in young children.

EdVenture opened in 2003. It is located on the same campus as the South Carolina State Museum. The two are not affiliated, despite their geographic proximity.
