= Dentsville, South Carolina =

- Census-designated place
- Location in Richland County and the state of South Carolina
- Coordinates: 34°03′52″N 80°59′19″W
- Country: United States
- State: South Carolina
- County: Richland

Area
  - Total: 6.82 sq mi (17.67 km^{2})
  - Land: 6.69 sq mi (17.33 km^{2})
  - Water: 0.14 sq mi (0.35 km^{2})
- Elevation: 230 ft (70 m)

Population (2020)
  - Total: 14,431
  - Density: 2,156.9/sq mi (832.77/km^{2})
- Time zone: UTC−5 (Eastern (EST))
  - Summer (DST): UTC−4 (EDT)
- FIPS code: 45-19285
- GNIS feature ID: 2402404

Dentsville is a census-designated place (CDP) in Richland County, South Carolina, United States. The population was 14,062 at the 2010 census. It is part of the Columbia, South Carolina metropolitan area.

== Geography ==
According to the United States Census Bureau, the CDP has a total area of 6.9 square miles (17.9 km^{2}), of which 6.8 square miles (17.5 km^{2}) is land and 0.12 square miles (0.3 km^{2}), or 1.93%, is water.

== Demographics ==
Historical population
Census	Pop.	Note	%±
2000	13,009		—
2010	14,062		8.1%
2020	14,431		2.6%
U.S. Decennial Census

=== Racial and ethnic composition ===
Dentsville CDP, South Carolina – Racial and ethnic composition Note: the US Census treats Hispanic/Latino as an ethnic category. This table excludes Latinos from the racial categories and assigns them to a separate category. Hispanics/Latinos may be of any race.
Race / Ethnicity (NH = Non-Hispanic)	Pop 2000	Pop 2010	Pop 2020	% 2000	% 2010	% 2020
White alone (NH)	4,564	2,977	2,332	35.08%	21.17%	16.16%
Black or African American alone (NH)	7,516	9,603	9,860	57.78%	68.29%	68.33%
Native American or Alaska Native alone (NH)	26	28	44	0.20%	0.20%	0.30%
Asian alone (NH)	328	386	559	2.52%	2.74%	3.87%
Native Hawaiian or Pacific Islander alone (NH)	6	17	11	0.05%	0.12%	0.08%
Other race alone (NH)	22	27	78	0.17%	0.19%	0.54%
Mixed race or Multiracial (NH)	170	272	417	1.31%	1.93%	2.89%
Hispanic or Latino (any race)	377	752	1,130	2.90%	5.35%	7.83%
Total	13,009	14,062	14,431	100.00%	100.00%	100.00%

=== 2020 census ===
As of the 2020 census, Dentsville had a population of 14,431. The median age was 36.9 years. 21.4% of residents were under the age of 18 and 17.1% of residents were 65 years of age or older. For every 100 females there were 79.0 males, and for every 100 females age 18 and over there were 75.0 males age 18 and over.

100.0% of residents lived in urban areas, while 0.0% lived in rural areas.

There were 6,577 households in Dentsville, including 3,599 family households. Of all households, 27.6% had children under the age of 18 living in them. Of all households, 23.3% were married-couple households, 23.7% were households with a male householder and no spouse or partner present, and 46.5% were households with a female householder and no spouse or partner present. About 39.9% of all households were made up of individuals and 11.5% had someone living alone who was 65 years of age or older.

There were 7,195 housing units, of which 8.6% were vacant. The homeowner vacancy rate was 1.6% and the rental vacancy rate was 8.6%.

=== 2000 census ===
As of the census of 2000, there were 13,009 people, 5,376 households, and 3,290 families residing in the CDP. The population density was 1,844.8 inhabitants per square mile (712.3/km^{2}). There were 5,797 housing units at an average density of 822.1 per square mile (317.4/km^{2}). The racial makeup of the CDP was 36.05% White, 58.28% African American, 0.21% Native American, 2.54% Asian, 0.05% Pacific Islander, 1.30% from other races, and 1.58% from two or more races. Hispanic or Latino of any race were 2.90% of the population.

There were 5,376 households, out of which 26.9% had children under the age of 18 living with them, 38.1% were married couples living together, 18.7% had a female householder with no husband present, and 38.8% were non-families. 32.2% of all households were made up of individuals, and 6.4% had someone living alone who was 65 years of age or older. The average household size was 2.30 and the average family size was 2.91.

In the CDP, the population was spread out, with 21.6% under the age of 18, 9.5% from 18 to 24, 34.6% from 25 to 44, 22.2% from 45 to 64, and 12.1% who were 65 years of age or older. The median age was 35 years. For every 100 females, there were 80.7 males. For every 100 females age 18 and over, there were 74.8 males.

The median income for a household in the CDP was $38,721, and the median income for a family was $46,996. Males had a median income of $32,015 versus $23,726 for females. The per capita income for the CDP was $19,916. About 7.1% of families and 8.6% of the population were below the poverty line, including 9.9% of those under age 18 and 5.9% of those age 65 or over.
