= Richland County School District Two =

School district in South Carolina, U.S.

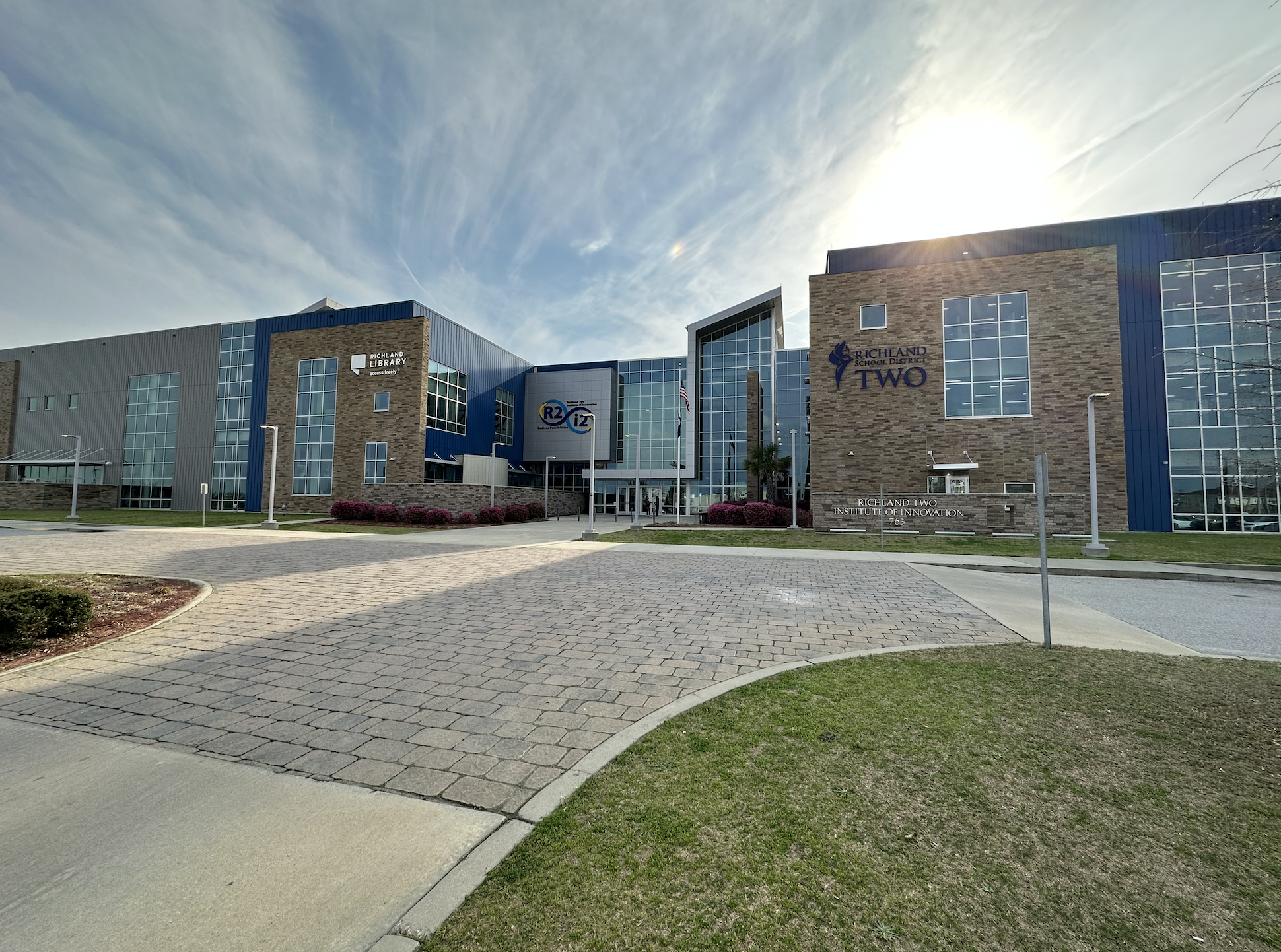
- The Richland Two Institute of Innovation (R2i2) houses the district office

Address
- 763 Fashion Drive Richland County, South Carolina Columbia, South Carolina, 29229; United States

District information
- Type: Public
- Motto: "The district of choice where every school is an excellent choice."
- Grades: Pre-K through 12
- Superintendent: Dr. Kim Moore
- Deputy superintendent(s): Marshalynn Franklin
- Chair of the board: Lindsay Agostini
- Schools: Elementary 19, Middle 7, High 5
- Budget: 332,729,770
- NCES District ID: 4503390

Students and staff
- Students: 28,303

Other information
- Website: www.richland2.org

Richland County School District Two (commonly referred to as Richland Two) is a nationally recognized school district located in suburban Columbia, South Carolina, United States, in the northeast section of Richland County. It is one of the fastest growing districts in South Carolina, with a current student population above 28,000. It operates 40 schools and centers, two district child development programs, two alternative schools, an adult/community center and several magnet centers and programs at all grade levels. The district offices are in an unincorporated area.

For K-12 the district serves Dentsville, Woodfield, most of Arcadia Lakes and Blythewood, and small sections of Columbia and Forest Acres. It serves Fort Jackson at the middle school and senior high school level.

== High schools ==
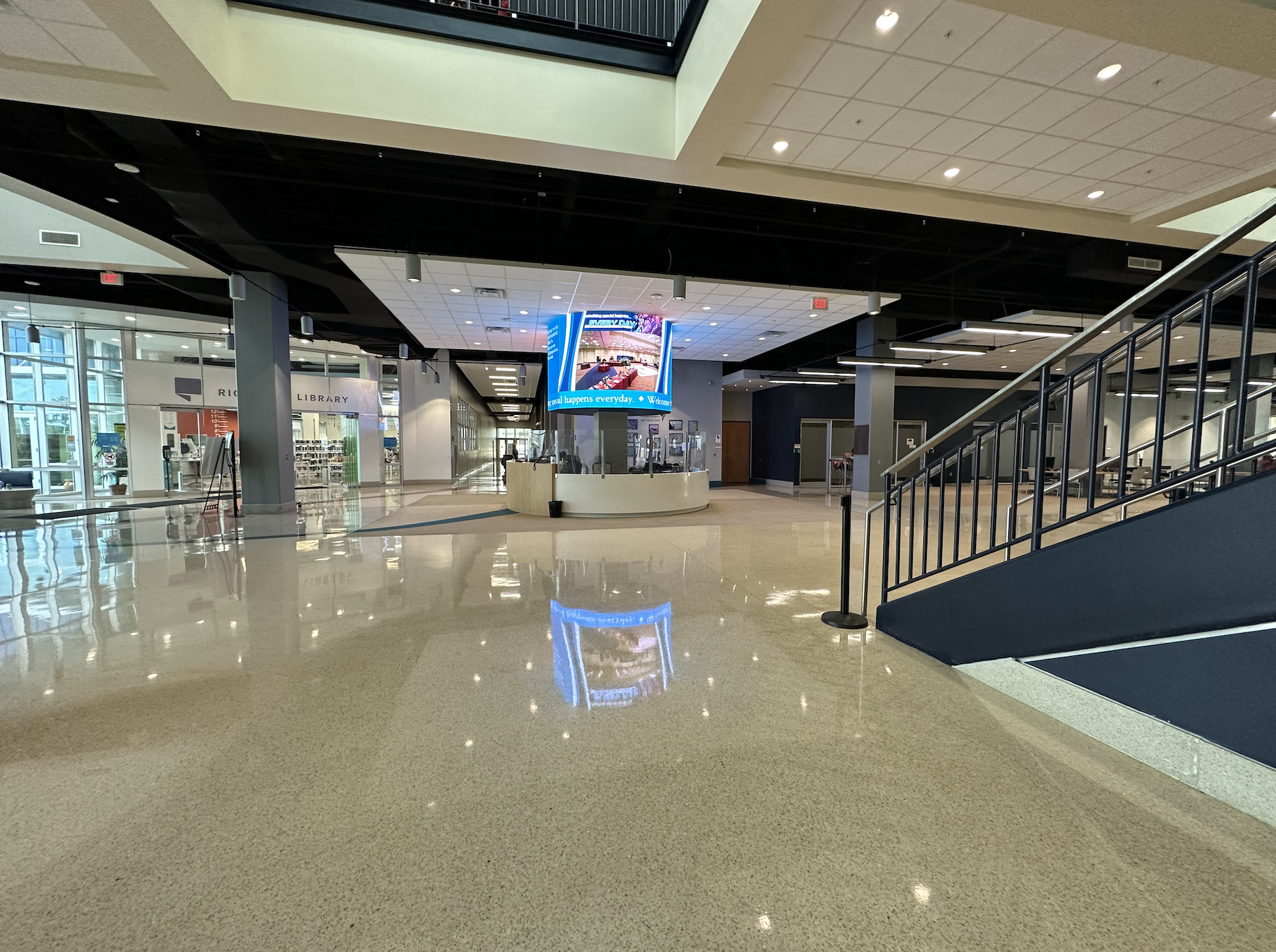
Inside the district office.

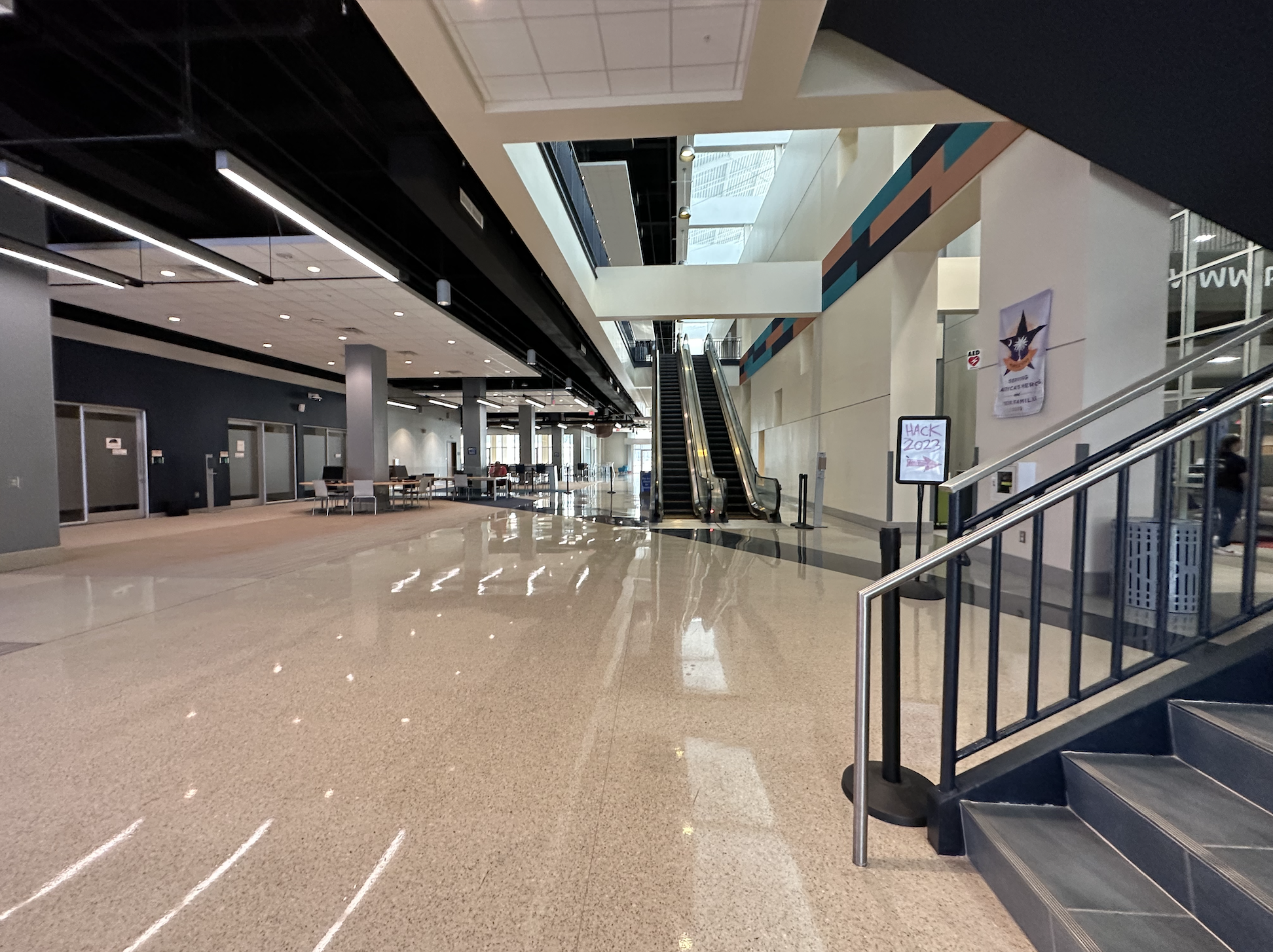
Inside the district office.

Richland Two operates five high schools, with twelve magnet programs for high schools.

- Ridge View High School
- Spring Valley High School
- Blythewood High School
- Richland Northeast High School
- Westwood High School
- Richland 2 Institute of Innovation

== Middle schools ==
Richland Two operates seven middle schools, with thirteen magnet programs for middle schools.

- Blythewood Middle School
- Dent Middle School
- Kelly Mill Middle School
- Longleaf Middle School
- Muller Road Middle School
- Summit Parkway Middle School
- E.L. Wright Middle School

== Elementary schools ==
Richland Two operates nineteen elementary schools, with nine magnet programs for elementary students located on middle school campuses.

- Bethel-Hanberry Elementary School
- Bookman Road Elementary School
- Bridge Creek Elementary School
- Catawba Trail Elementary School
- Center for Achievement: (located at Kelly Mill Middle School)
- Center for Inquiry (located at Summit Parkway Middle School)
- Center for Knowledge (located at E.L. Wright Middle School)
- Center for Knowledge North (located at Muller Road Middle School)
- Conder Elementary School
- Forest Lake Elementary School
- Joseph Keels Elementary School
- Jackson Creek Elementary School
- Killian Elementary School
- Lake Carolina Elementary School Lower Campus
- Lake Carolina Elementary School Upper Campus
- Langford Elementary School
- Lonnie B. Nelson Elementary School
- North Springs Elementary School
- Polo Road Elementary School
- Pontiac Elementary School
- Rice Creek Elementary School
- Round Top Elementary School
- Sandlapper Elementary School
- Windsor Elementary School

== Child Development ==
Richland Two operates one district-wide child development program.

- Richland Two Center for Child Development

== Other Schools ==
- Blythewood Academy
- R2 Virtual School
- W.R. Rogers Adult, Continuing and Technology Education Center (Adult Education)

== See also ==
- Richland County School District One
