= Bookman =

Bookman may refer to:

- Bookman (Caribbean folklore), one of several traditional representations of the Devil in Trinidad Carnival.
- Bookman (Black Order), a character in the manga series D.Gray-man
- Bookman (occupation), a person who engages in bookselling
- Bookman (reading), a person who loves books
- Bookman (typeface), a serif typeface derived from Old Style Antique
- Bookman, South Carolina, a community in the United States
- Sony Bookman, a pre-release name for the Sony Multimedia CD-ROM Player device
- Franklin Bookman, a 1990s e-reader system created by Franklin Electronic Publishers

== People with the surname Bookman ==
- Dutty Boukman a self-educated slave
- Louis Bookman (1890–1943), Lithuanian-born footballer and cricketer
- Sandra Bookman (born 1959), American television news reporter and anchor
- Lt. Joe Bookman, a fictional character in the sitcom Seinfeld in the episode "The Library"
- Nathan Bookman, a fictional character in the sitcom Good Times

== Publications ==
- The Bookman (London)
- The Bookman (New York)
