= Forest Acres, South Carolina =

- City
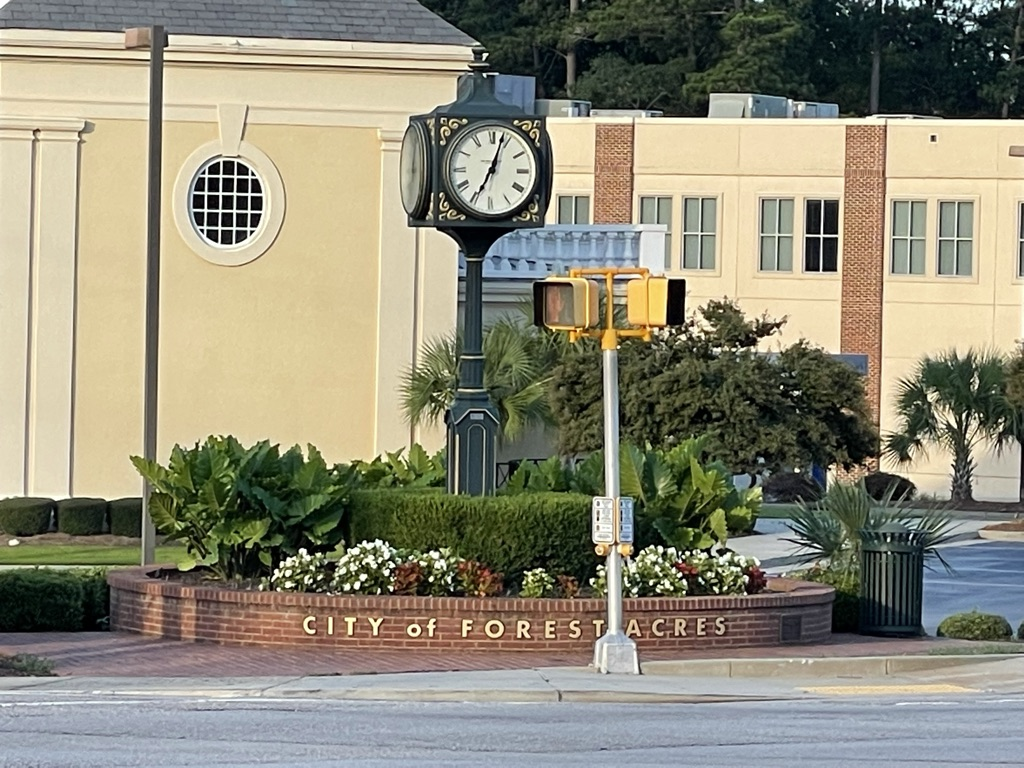
- Clock and buildings in Forrest Acres

- Seal

- Location in Richland County and the state of South Carolina.
- Coordinates: 34°01′55″N 80°58′18″W
- Country: United States
- State: South Carolina
- County: Richland

Area
  - Total: 4.98 sq mi (12.90 km^{2})
  - Land: 4.61 sq mi (11.94 km^{2})
  - Water: 0.37 sq mi (0.96 km^{2})
- Elevation: 243 ft (74 m)

Population (2020)
  - Total: 10,617
  - Density: 2,302.1/sq mi (888.83/km^{2})
- Time zone: UTC−5 (EST)
  - Summer (DST): UTC−4 (EDT)
- ZIP code: 29206, 29204
- Area codes: 803, 839
- FIPS code: 45-26305
- GNIS feature ID: 2403633
- Website: forestacres.net

Forest Acres is a city in Richland County, South Carolina, United States. The population was 10,617 at the 2020 census. It is part of the Columbia, South Carolina metropolitan area and is an enclave of the city of Columbia.

== Geography ==
According to the United States Census Bureau, the city has a total area of 5.0 square miles (12.9 km^{2}), of which 4.6 square miles (11.9 km^{2}) is land and 0.39 square miles (1.0 km^{2}), or 7.46%, is water.

== Demographics ==
Historical population
| Census | Pop. | Note | %± |
|---|---|---|---|
| 1940 | 323 | | — |
| 1950 | 3,240 | | 903.1% |
| 1960 | 3,842 | | 18.6% |
| 1970 | 6,808 | | 77.2% |
| 1980 | 6,062 | | −11.0% |
| 1990 | 7,197 | | 18.7% |
| 2000 | 10,558 | | 46.7% |
| 2010 | 10,361 | | −1.9% |
| 2020 | 10,617 | | 2.5% |
| 2025 (est.) | 10,390 | ▼ | −2.1% |
U.S. Decennial Census

=== Racial and ethnic composition ===
Forest Acres city, South Carolina – Racial and ethnic composition Note: the US Census treats Hispanic/Latino as an ethnic category. This table excludes Latinos from the racial categories and assigns them to a separate category. Hispanics/Latinos may be of any race.
| Race / Ethnicity (NH = Non-Hispanic) | Pop 2000 | Pop 2010 | Pop 2020 | % 2000 | % 2010 | % 2020 |
|---|---|---|---|---|---|---|
| White alone (NH) | 8,410 | 7,732 | 7,799 | 79.66% | 74.63% | 73.46% |
| Black or African American alone (NH) | 1,631 | 1,983 | 1,824 | 15.45% | 19.14% | 17.18% |
| Native American or Alaska Native alone (NH) | 12 | 14 | 17 | 0.11% | 0.14% | 0.16% |
| Asian alone (NH) | 119 | 151 | 174 | 1.13% | 1.46% | 1.64% |
| Native Hawaiian or Pacific Islander alone (NH) | 1 | 6 | 12 | 0.01% | 0.06% | 0.11% |
| Other race alone (NH) | 14 | 11 | 31 | 0.13% | 0.11% | 0.29% |
| Mixed race or Multiracial (NH) | 103 | 151 | 378 | 0.98% | 1.46% | 3.56% |
| Hispanic or Latino (any race) | 268 | 313 | 382 | 2.54% | 3.02% | 3.60% |
| Total | 10,558 | 10,361 | 10,617 | 100.00% | 100.00% | 100.00% |

=== 2020 census ===
As of the 2020 census, Forest Acres had a population of 10,617, 4,938 households, and 2,716 families residing in the city.

The median age was 41.7 years, 21.3% of residents were under the age of 18, and 21.2% were 65 years of age or older.

For every 100 females there were 84.3 males, and for every 100 females age 18 and over there were 79.5 males age 18 and over.

100.0% of residents lived in urban areas, while 0.0% lived in rural areas.

There were 4,938 households in Forest Acres, of which 26.5% had children under the age of 18 living in them. Of all households, 40.3% were married-couple households, 18.5% were households with a male householder and no spouse or partner present, and 36.9% were households with a female householder and no spouse or partner present. About 38.1% of all households were made up of individuals and 17.1% had someone living alone who was 65 years of age or older.

There were 5,452 housing units, of which 9.4% were vacant. The homeowner vacancy rate was 1.7% and the rental vacancy rate was 14.5%.

=== 2000 census ===
As of the census of 2000, there were 10,558 people, 4,987 households, and 2,842 families residing in the city. The population density was 2,300.9 inhabitants per square mile (888.4/km^{2}). There were 5,232 housing units at an average density of 1,140.2 per square mile (440.2/km^{2}). The racial makeup of the city is 80.87% White, 15.52% African American, 0.19% Native American, 1.16% Asian, 0.01% Pacific Islander, 1.02% from other races, and 1.22% from two or more races. 2.54% of the population are Hispanic or Latino of any race.

There were 4,987 households, out of which 22.6% had children under the age of 18 living with them, 44.0% were married couples living together, 10.7% had a female householder with no husband present, and 43.0% were non-families. 37.3% of all households were made up of individuals, and 15.9% had someone living alone who was 65 years of age or older. The average household size was 2.09 and the average family size was 2.76.

In the city, the population was spread out, with 19.9% under the age of 18, 6.6% from 18 to 24, 27.6% from 25 to 44, 23.7% from 45 to 64, and 22.2% who were 65 years of age or older. The median age was 42 years. For every 100 females, there were 81.2 males. For every 100 females age 18 and over, there were 77.1 males.

The median income for a household in the city was $46,628, and the median income for a family was $62,026. Males had a median income of $38,277 versus $31,438 for females. The per capita income for the city was $29,907. About 5.2% of families and 7.4% of the population were below the poverty line, including 12.0% of those under age 18 and 3.9% of those age 65 or over.

== Government ==
Forest Acres is governed by a mayor and four council members elected to four-year terms. The mayor since 2023 is Tom Andrews.

== Education ==
A.C. Flora High School serves portions of Forest Acres and is in Richland County School District One. Richland Northeast High School serves the majority of the city and is in Richland County School District Two.

== Notable people ==
- Jordan Anderson, NASCAR driver
- Edgar L. McGowan, Commissioner of the South Carolina Department of Labor (1971–1989)
