= Richland County, South Carolina =

County in South Carolina, United States

- County
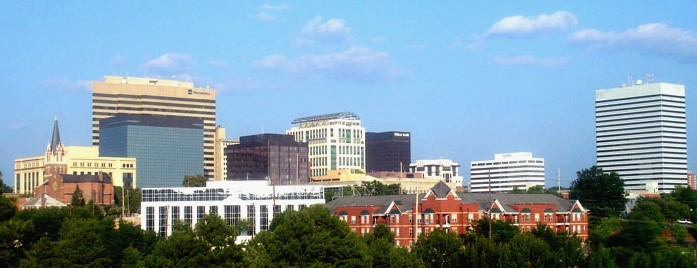
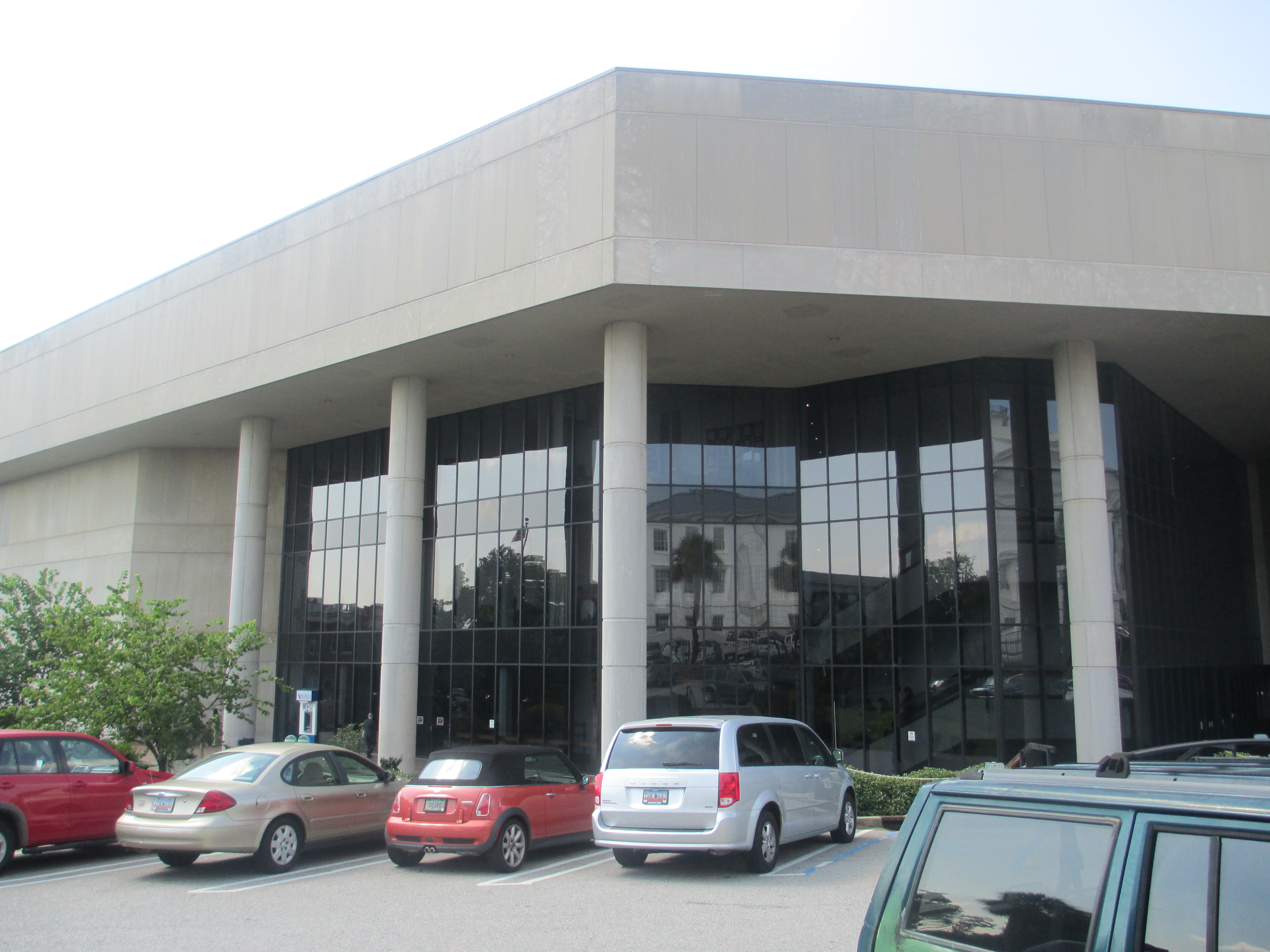
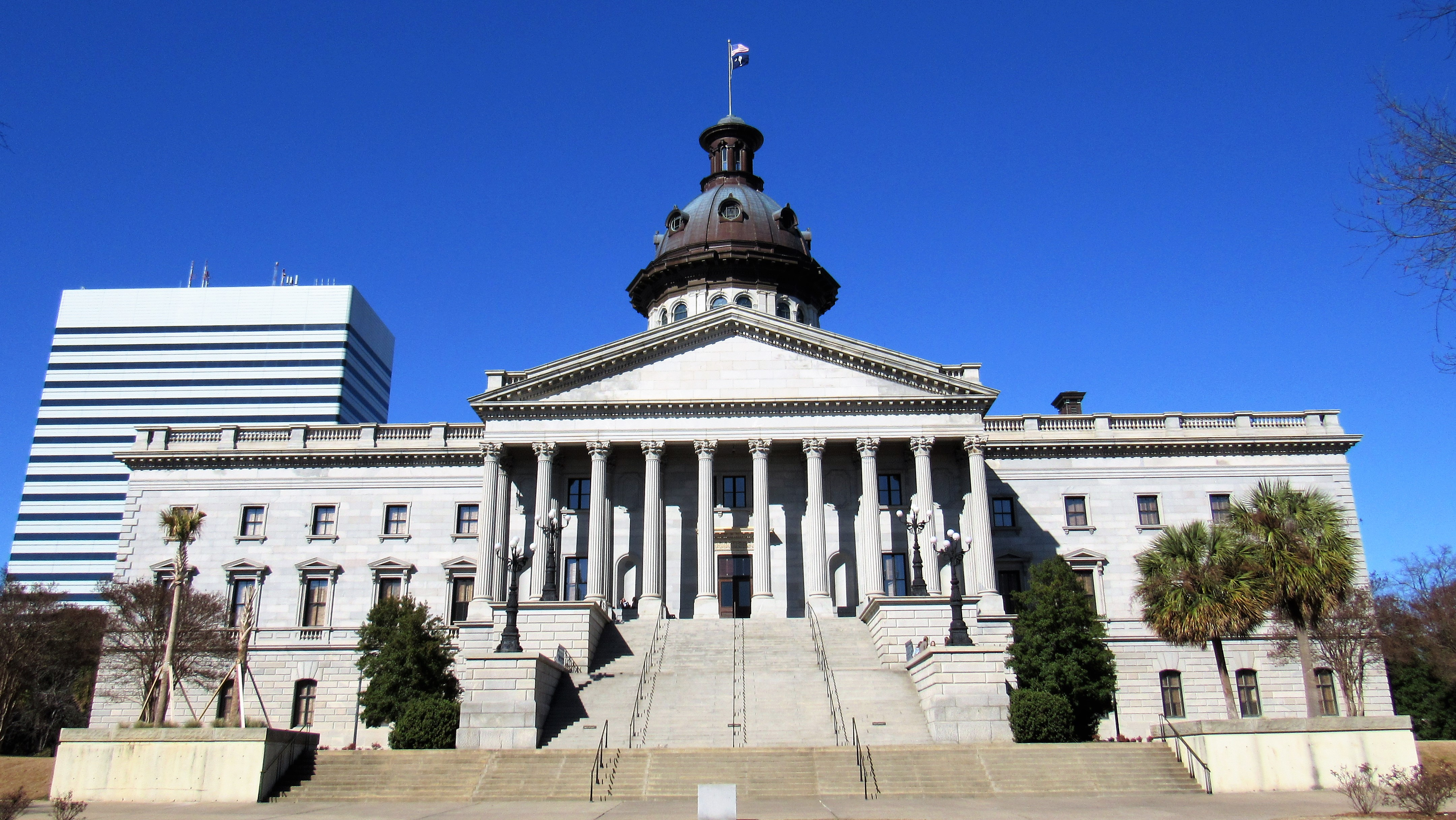
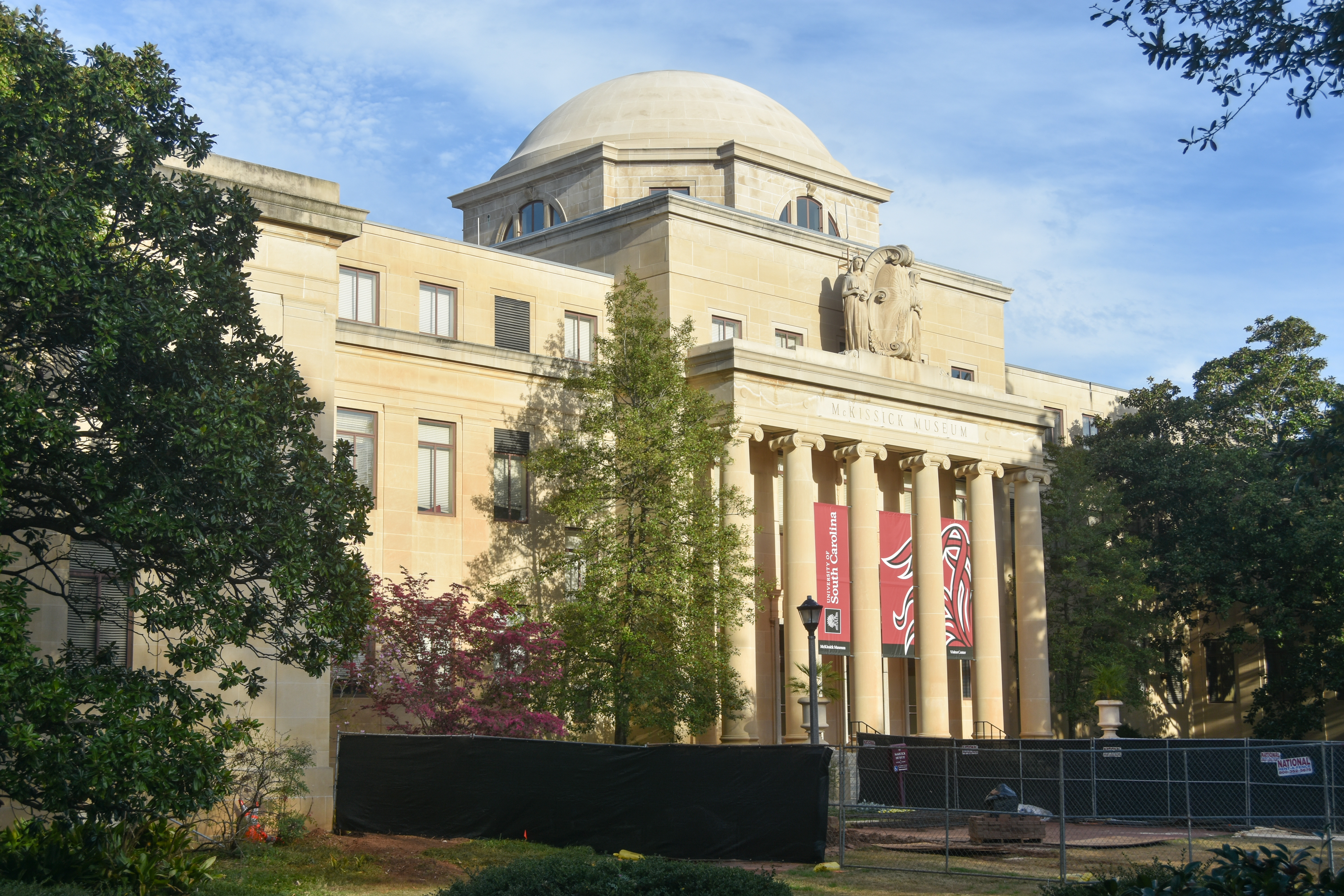
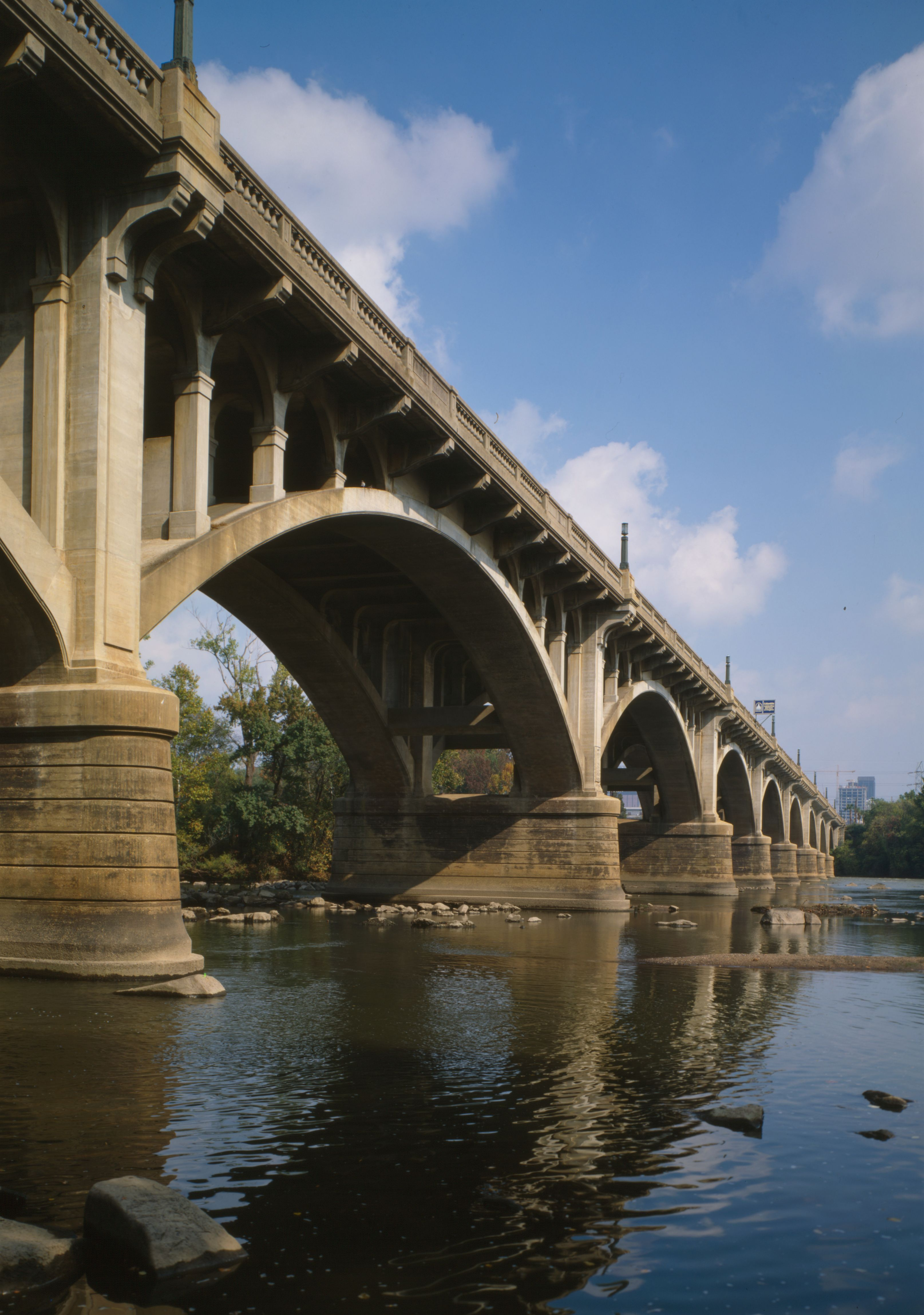
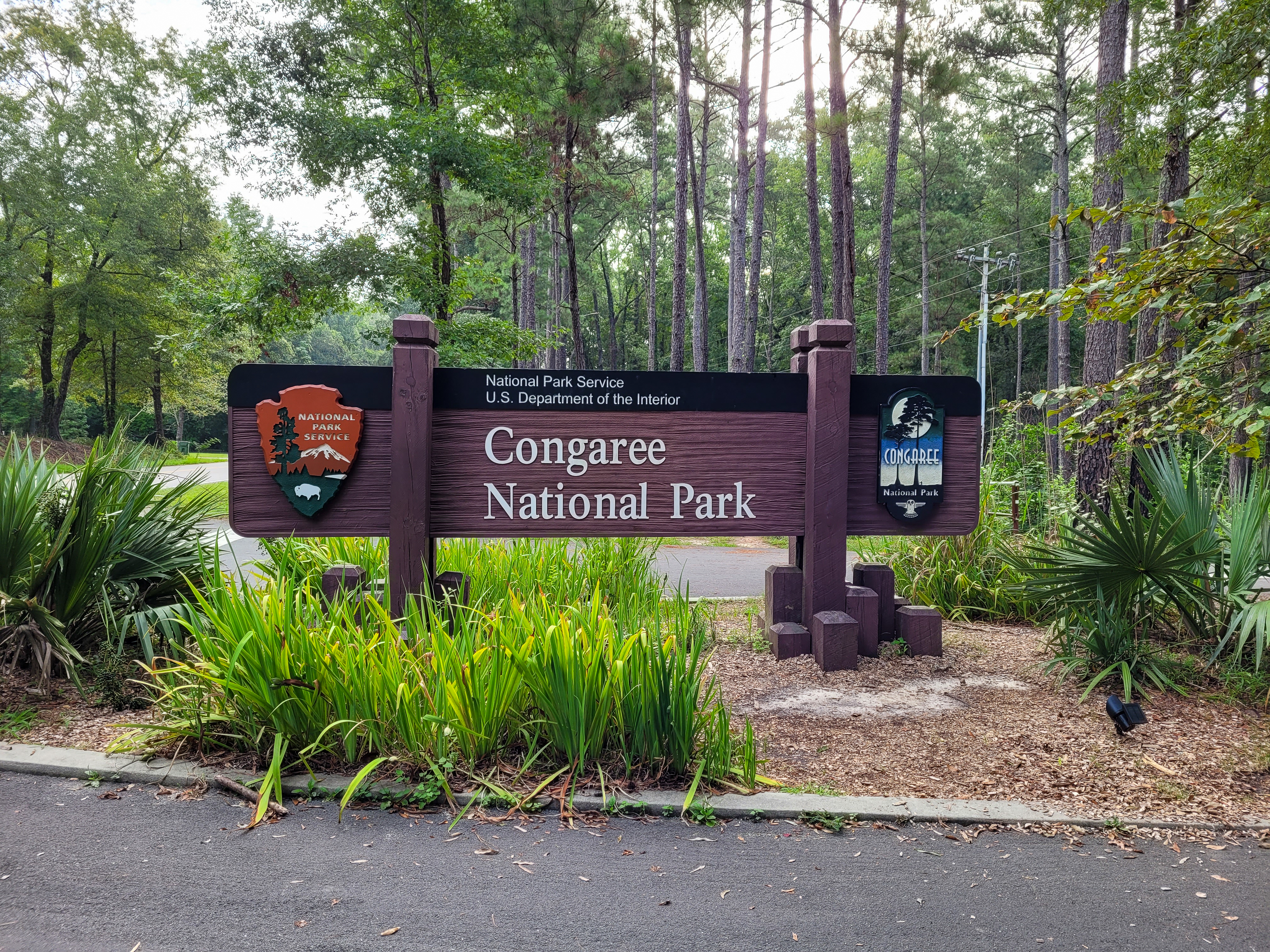
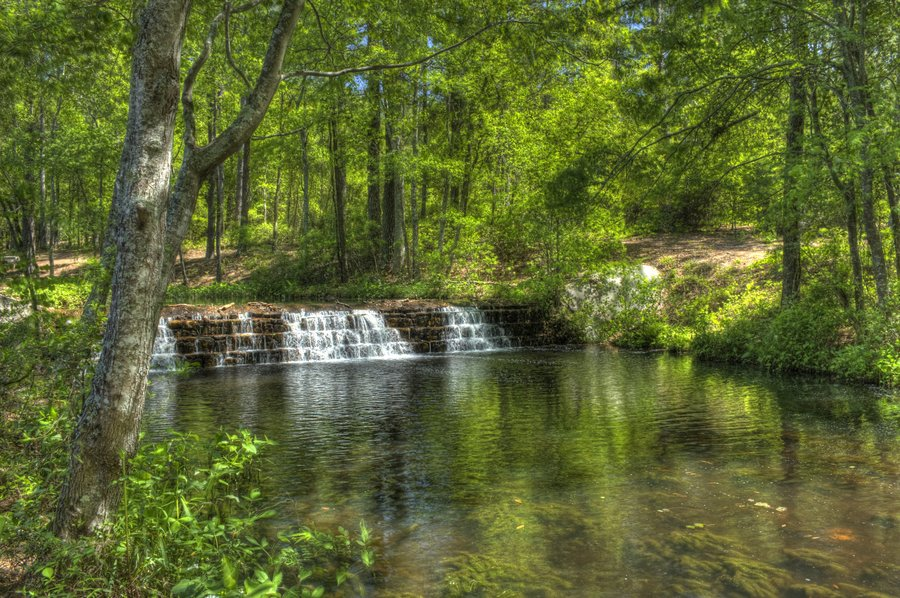
- Skyline of Columbia Richland County Justice Center South Carolina State House University of South Carolina Gervais Street Bridge over the Congaree River Congaree National Park Sesquicentennial State Park

- Flag Seal Logo
- Motto: "Uniquely Urban...Uniquely Rural"
- Location within the U.S. state of South Carolina
- Coordinates: 34.03°N 80.90°W
- Country: United States
- State: South Carolina
- Founded: March 12, 1785
- Named for: The county's "rich land"
- Seat: Columbia
- Largest community: Columbia

Area
  - Total: 771.96 sq mi (1,999.4 km^{2})
  - Land: 757.28 sq mi (1,961.3 km^{2})
  - Water: 14.68 sq mi (38.0 km^{2}) 1.90%

Population (2020)
  - Total: 416,147
  - Estimate (2025): 434,956 ▲
  - Density: 549.53/sq mi (212.17/km^{2})
- Time zone: UTC−5 (Eastern)
  - Summer (DST): UTC−4 (EDT)
- Congressional districts: 2nd, 6th
- Website: www.richlandcountysc.gov

Richland County is located in the U.S. state of South Carolina. As of the 2020 census, its population was 416,147, making it the second-most populous county in South Carolina, behind only Greenville County. The county seat and largest community is Columbia, the state capital. The county was established on March 12, 1785. Richland County is part of the Columbia, SC Metropolitan Statistical Area. In 2020, the center of population of South Carolina was located in Richland County, in the city of Columbia. The county is also the location of the geographic center of South Carolina, southeast of Columbia. It is located in the Midlands region of South Carolina.

== History ==
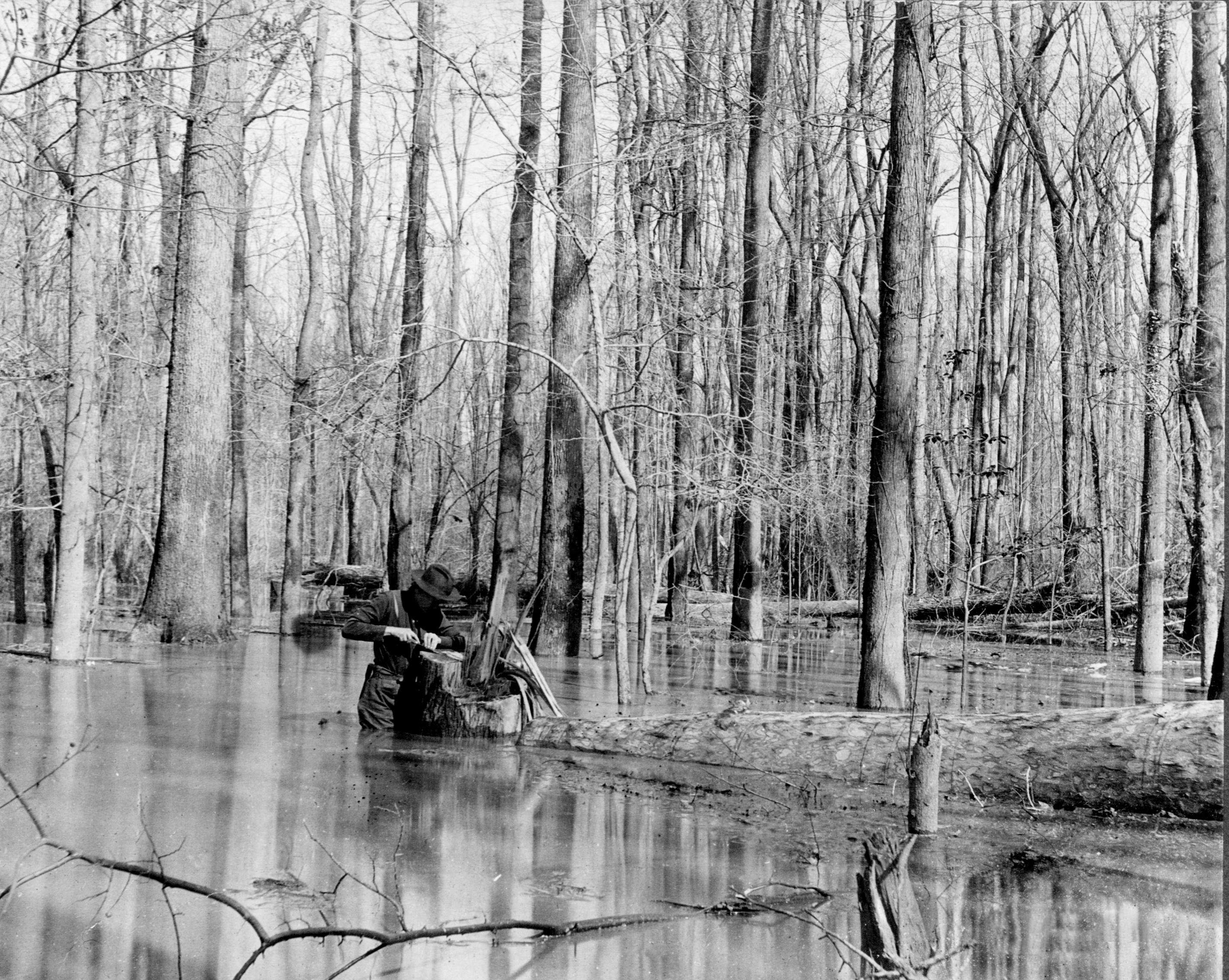
Harvesting red gum trees in Richland County, 1904

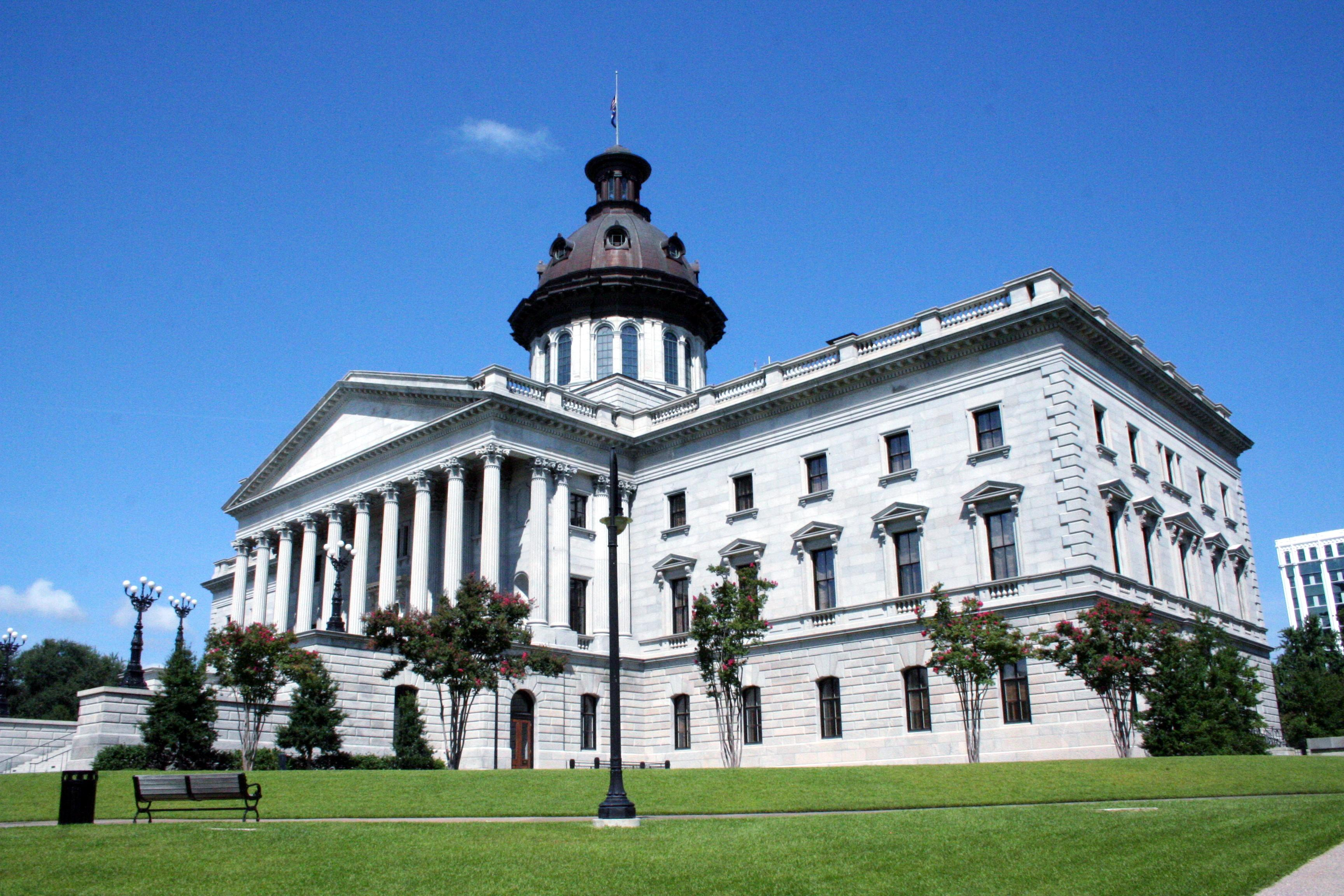
South Carolina State House; Richland County holds the state's capitol in Columbia.

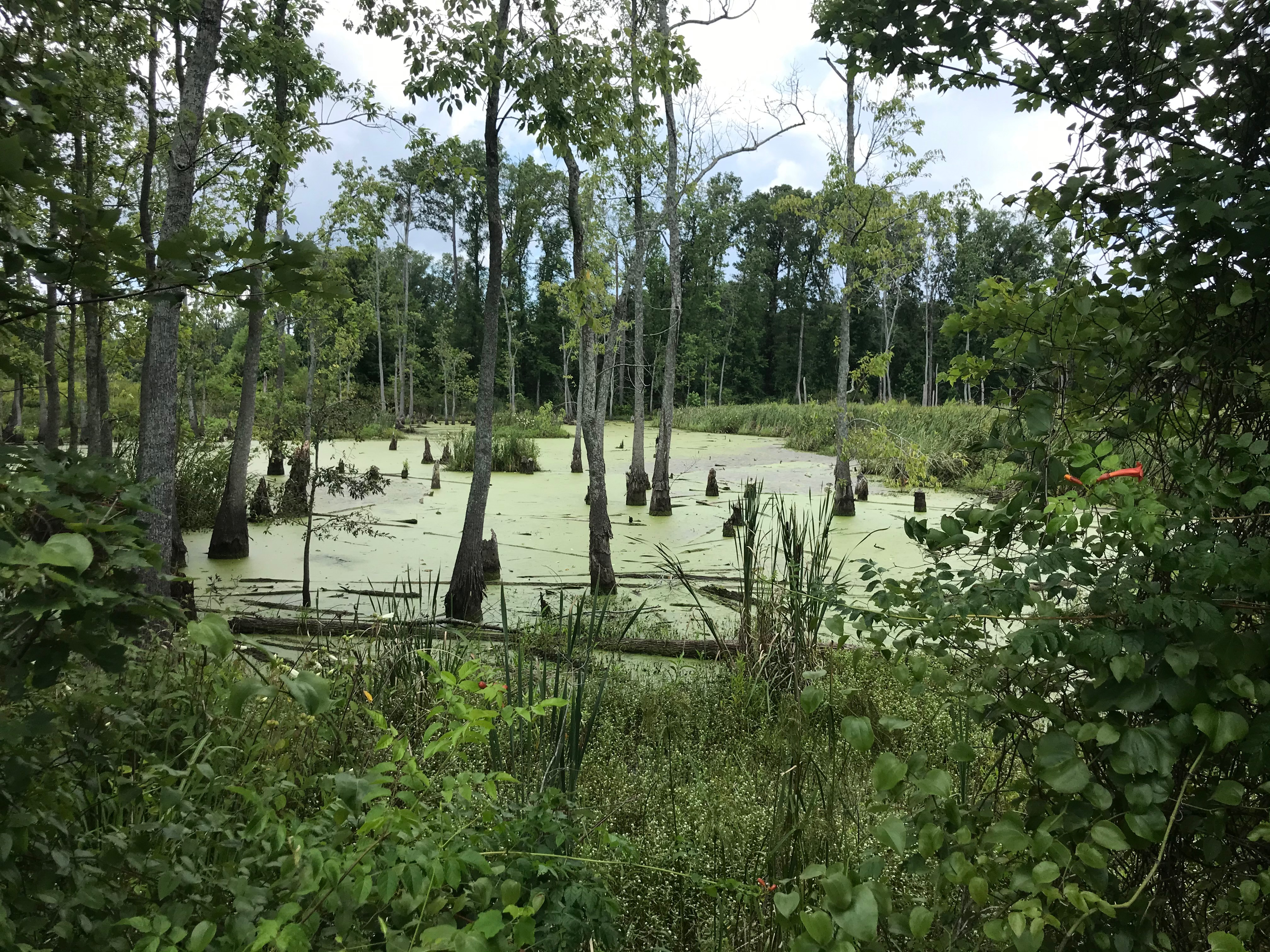
A swamp in rural Richland County

Richland County was probably named for its "rich land". The county was formed in 1785 as part of the large Camden District. A small part of Richland County was later ceded to adjacent Kershaw County in 1791. The county seat and largest city is Columbia, which is also the state capital. In 1786, the state legislature decided to move the capital from Charleston to a more central location. A site was chosen in Richland County, which is in the geographic center of the state, and a new town was laid out. Richland County's boundaries were formally incorporated on December 18, 1799. Cotton from the surrounding plantations was shipped through Columbia and later manufactured into textiles there. General William T. Sherman captured Columbia during the Civil War and his troops burned the town and parts of the county on February 17, 1865. The U. S. Army returned on friendlier terms in 1917, when Fort Jackson was established, which is now the largest and most active Initial Entry Training Center in the U.S. Army. The South Carolina State House is located in downtown Columbia.

== Geography ==
Interactive map of Richland County

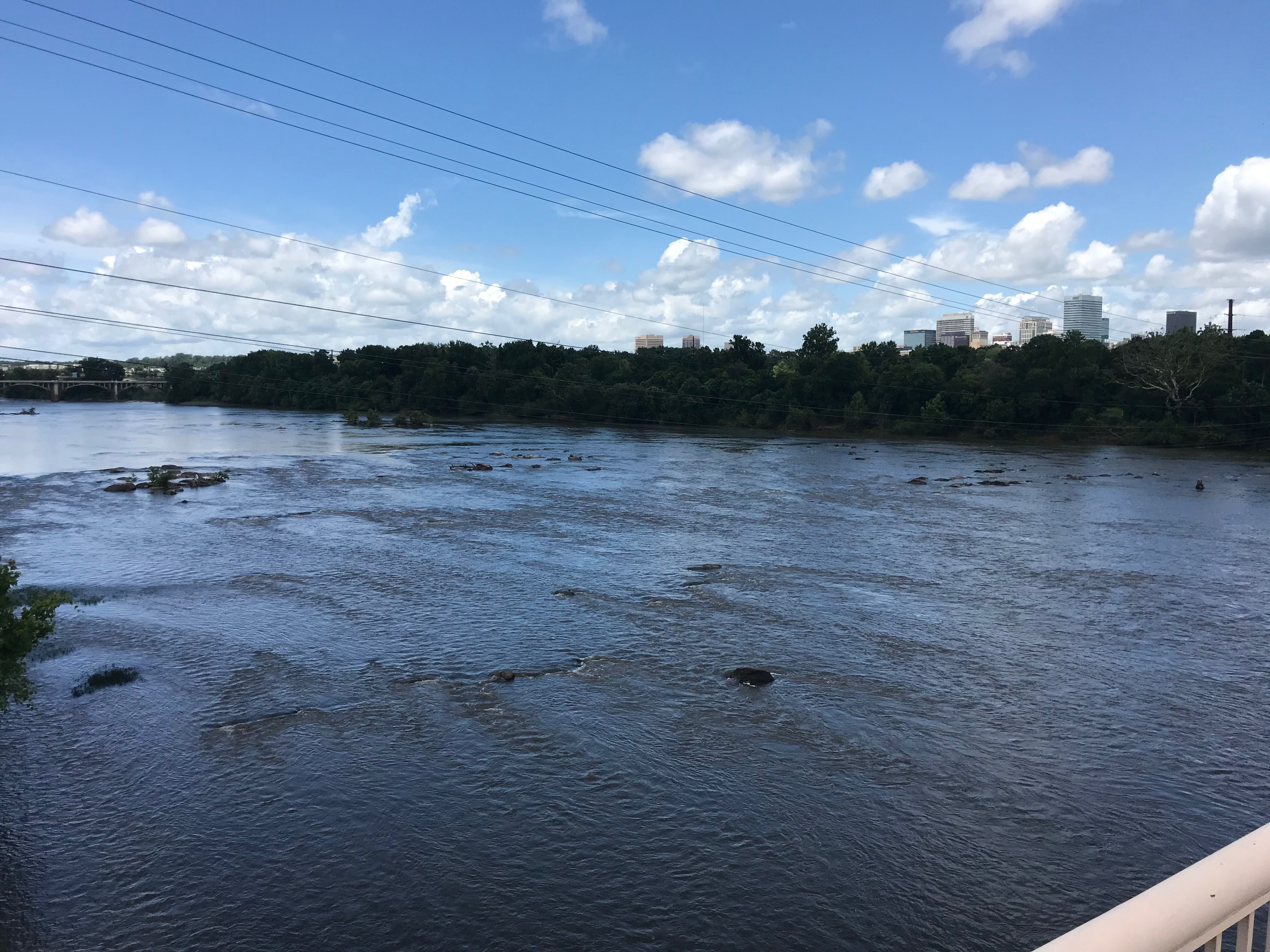
The Congaree River makes the border between Richland and Lexington counties.

According to the U.S. Census Bureau, the county has a total area of 771.96 square miles (1,999.4 km^{2}), of which 757.28 square miles (1,961.3 km^{2}) is land and 14.68 square miles (38.0 km^{2}), or 1.90%, is water. Richland County is situated in the center of South Carolina.

=== National protected area ===
- Congaree National Park

=== State and local protected areas/sites ===
- Harbison State Forest
- Nipper Creek Heritage Preserve
- Riverbanks Zoo and Garden
- Sesquicentennial State Park
- South Carolina State Fair
- South Carolina State Museum
- Wateree Heritage Preserve/Wildlife Management Area

=== Major bodies of water ===
- Broad River
- Congaree River
- Lake Murray
- Little River
- Saluda River
- Wateree River

=== Adjacent counties ===
- Kershaw County – northeast
- Fairfield County – north
- Sumter County – east
- Lexington County – west
- Calhoun County – south
- Newberry County – northwest

== Demographics ==
Historical population
Census	Pop.	Note	%±
1790	3,930		—
1800	6,097		55.1%
1810	9,027		48.1%
1820	12,321		36.5%
1830	14,772		19.9%
1840	16,397		11.0%
1850	20,243		23.5%
1860	18,307		−9.6%
1870	23,025		25.8%
1880	28,573		24.1%
1890	36,821		28.9%
1900	45,589		23.8%
1910	55,143		21.0%
1920	78,122		41.7%
1930	87,667		12.2%
1940	104,843		19.6%
1950	142,565		36.0%
1960	200,102		40.4%
1970	233,868		16.9%
1980	269,735		15.3%
1990	285,720		5.9%
2000	320,677		12.2%
2010	384,504		19.9%
2020	416,147		8.2%
2025 (est.)	434,956	▲	4.5%
U.S. Decennial Census; 1790–1960 1900–1990; 1990–2000 2010 2020

=== Racial and ethnic composition ===
Richland County, South Carolina – Racial and ethnic composition Note: the US Census treats Hispanic/Latino as an ethnic category. This table excludes Latinos from the racial categories and assigns them to a separate category. Hispanics/Latinos may be of any race.
Race / Ethnicity (NH = Non-Hispanic)	Pop 1980	Pop 1990	Pop 2000	Pop 2010	Pop 2020	% 1980	% 1990	% 2000	% 2010	% 2020
White alone (NH)	159,043	157,969	157,843	174,267	172,644	58.96%	55.29%	49.22%	45.32%	41.49%
Black or African American alone (NH)	103,055	118,652	143,773	174,549	188,141	38.21%	41.53%	44.83%	45.40%	45.21%
Native American or Alaska Native alone (NH)	431	657	709	987	888	0.16%	0.23%	0.22%	0.26%	0.21%
Asian alone (NH)	2,231	3,680	5,441	8,433	11,330	0.83%	1.29%	1.70%	2.19%	2.72%
Native Hawaiian or Pacific Islander alone (NH)	x	x	228	372	427	x	x	0.07%	0.10%	0.10%
Other race alone (NH)	647	115	442	562	1,872	0.24%	0.04%	0.14%	0.15%	0.45%
Mixed race or Multiracial (NH)	x	x	3,528	6,697	14,750	x	x	1.10%	1.74%	3.54%
Hispanic or Latino (any race)	4,328	4,647	8,713	18,637	26,095	1.60%	1.63%	2.72%	4.85%	6.27%
Total	269,735	285,720	320,677	384,504	416,147	100.00%	100.00%	100.00%	100.00%	100.00%

=== 2020 census ===
As of the 2020 census, the county had a population of 416,147 people and 165,679 households, while 90,802 families resided in the county. The median age was 35.7 years, 21.3% of residents were under the age of 18, and 14.4% of residents were 65 years of age or older. For every 100 females there were 90.8 males, and for every 100 females age 18 and over there were 87.7 males age 18 and over.

The racial makeup of the county was 42.6% White, 45.7% Black or African American, 0.3% American Indian and Alaska Native, 2.7% Asian, 0.1% Native Hawaiian and Pacific Islander, 2.8% from some other race, and 5.7% from two or more races. Hispanic or Latino residents of any race comprised 6.3% of the population.

91.4% of residents lived in urban areas, while 8.6% lived in rural areas.

There were 182,408 housing units, of which 9.2% were vacant. Among occupied housing units, 59.4% were owner-occupied and 40.6% were renter-occupied. The homeowner vacancy rate was 1.9% and the rental vacancy rate was 10.7%.

=== 2010 census ===
At the 2010 census, 384,504 people, 145,194 households, and 89,357 families were residing in the county. The population density was 507.9 inhabitants per square mile (196.1/km^{2}). There were 161,725 housing units at an average density of 213.6 per square mile (82.5/km^{2}). The racial makeup of the county was 45.3% White, 48.9% African American, 2.2% Asian, 0.3% American Indian, 0.1% Pacific Islander, 1.9% from other races, and 2.2% from two or more races. Those of Hispanic or Latino origin made up 4.8% of the population. In terms of ancestry, 9.6% were German, 8.6% were English, 7.6% were Irish, and 7.1% were American.

Of the 145,194 households, 32.9% had children under 18 living with them, 39.6% were married couples living together, 17.7% had a female householder with no husband present, 38.5% were not families, and 30.2% of all households were made up of individuals. The average household size was 2.43, and the average family size was 3.05. The median age was 32.6 years.

The median income for a household in the county was $47,922 and for a family was $61,622. Males had a median income of $42,453 versus $34,012 for females. The per capita income for the county was $25,805. About 10.0% of families and 14.5% of the population were below the poverty line, including 17.6% of those under age 18 and 9.7% of those age 65 or over.

== Law and government ==
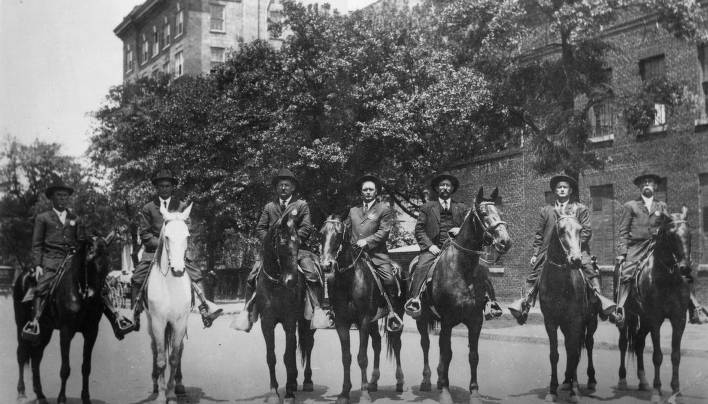
Richland County Sheriff's Department Horses, 1913 in Columbia

Richland County is governed by a county council, who hold concurrent four-year terms. Richland County is governed under the Council-Administrator form of government, which is very similar to the council–manager form of government. The major difference between the council–manager and council–administrator forms of government is the title of the chief executive.

County council (as of 2026)
District	Council person
District 1	Jason Branham
District 2	Derrek Pugh (vice chair)
District 3	Tyra Little
District 4	Paul Livingston
District 5	Allison Terracio
District 6	Don Weaver
District 7	Gretchen Cooper
District 8	Tish Dozier Alleyne
District 9	Jesica Mackey (chair)
District 10	Cheryl English
District 11	Chakisse Newton

The South Carolina Department of Corrections, headquartered in Columbia and in Richland County, operates several correctional facilities in Columbia and in Richland County. They include the Broad River Correctional Institution, the Goodman Correctional Institution, the Camille Griffin Graham Correctional Institution, the Stevenson Correctional Institution, and the Campbell Pre-Release Center. Graham houses the state's female death row. The State of South Carolina execution chamber is located at Broad River. From 1990 to 1997 Broad River housed the state's male death row.

In March 2008, the Richland County Sheriff's Department acquired an armored personnel carrier equipped with a .50 caliber machine gun. Reason magazine criticized the acquisition as "overkill".

=== Politics ===
Richland County was one of the first areas of South Carolina to break away from a Solid South voting pattern. From 1948 to 1988, it only supported the official Democratic candidate for president once, in 1976. It voted for splinter Dixiecrat Strom Thurmond in 1948, and for unpledged electors in 1956.

Since 1992, Richland County has been one of the stronger Democratic bastions in South Carolina, following the trend of most urban counties across the country.

United States presidential election results for Richland County, South Carolina
Year	Republican		Democratic		Third party(ies)	
Year	No.	%	No.	%	No.	%
1892	146	15.63%	788	84.37%	0	0.00%
1896	468	32.91%	925	65.05%	29	2.04%
1900	62	12.23%	445	87.77%	0	0.00%
1904	122	9.09%	1,220	90.91%	0	0.00%
1908	236	11.76%	1,750	87.19%	21	1.05%
1912	23	1.30%	1,557	88.17%	186	10.53%
1916	292	11.20%	2,283	87.57%	32	1.23%
1920	295	10.81%	2,434	89.19%	0	0.00%
1924	88	3.48%	2,369	93.60%	74	2.92%
1928	444	12.33%	3,158	87.67%	0	0.00%
1932	119	2.64%	4,371	97.13%	10	0.22%
1936	152	2.21%	6,728	97.79%	0	0.00%
1940	167	3.38%	4,781	96.62%	0	0.00%
1944	140	1.98%	6,590	93.12%	347	4.90%
1948	670	7.29%	2,419	26.31%	6,104	66.40%
1952	15,925	64.17%	8,890	35.83%	0	0.00%
1956	6,714	29.99%	6,154	27.49%	9,516	42.51%
1960	20,736	63.94%	11,694	36.06%	0	0.00%
1964	27,306	60.35%	17,939	39.65%	0	0.00%
1968	26,215	50.96%	18,198	35.37%	7,032	13.67%
1972	39,746	64.11%	21,462	34.62%	787	1.27%
1976	32,727	46.78%	36,855	52.68%	380	0.54%
1980	36,337	49.87%	33,158	45.50%	3,374	4.63%
1984	46,773	57.44%	32,212	39.56%	2,444	3.00%
1988	43,841	52.74%	36,420	43.81%	2,862	3.44%
1992	43,744	41.17%	53,648	50.49%	8,858	8.34%
1996	39,092	41.05%	52,222	54.84%	3,916	4.11%
2000	50,164	43.07%	63,179	54.24%	3,138	2.69%
2004	56,212	42.01%	76,283	57.01%	1,306	0.98%
2008	57,941	35.11%	105,656	64.02%	1,440	0.87%
2012	53,105	33.37%	103,989	65.34%	2,060	1.29%
2016	52,469	31.10%	108,000	64.01%	8,253	4.89%
2020	58,313	30.09%	132,570	68.40%	2,939	1.52%
2024	58,019	31.81%	121,110	66.39%	3,282	1.80%

== Economy ==
In 2022, the GDP was $32 billion (about $75,222 per capita), and the real GDP was $27.3 billion (about $64,302 per capita) in chained 2017 dollars.

Top ten employers (2019)
Rank	Employer	Employees
1	Prisma Health	16,000
2	Blue Cross Blue Shield	10,000
3	University of South Carolina	7,000
4	South Carolina Department of Corrections	5,000
5	Richland County School District One	5,000
6	South Carolina Department of Transportation	5,000
7	South Carolina Department of Mental Health	5,000
8	South Carolina Department of Social Services	5,000
9	Richland County School District Two	4,000
10	South Carolina Department of Health and Environmental Control	4,000

Employment and Wage Statistics by Industry in Richland County, South Carolina - Q3 2023
Industry	Employment Counts	Employment Percentage (%)	Average Annual Wage ($)
Accommodation and Food Services	21,045	9.5	22,100
Administrative and Support and Waste Management and Remediation Services	16,431	7.4	41,652
Agriculture, Forestry, Fishing and Hunting	807	0.4	48,776
Arts, Entertainment, and Recreation	3,934	1.8	22,412
Construction	6,934	3.1	69,108
Educational Services	19,160	8.6	57,252
Finance and Insurance	20,736	9.4	74,516
Health Care and Social Assistance	33,974	15.3	71,812
Information	2,769	1.2	75,348
Management of Companies and Enterprises	1,375	0.6	98,956
Manufacturing	12,069	5.4	70,980
Mining, Quarrying, and Oil and Gas Extraction	122	0.1	78,208
Other Services (except Public Administration)	6,864	3.1	44,876
Professional, Scientific, and Technical Services	13,750	6.2	88,556
Public Administration	24,376	11.0	61,620
Real Estate and Rental and Leasing	3,862	1.7	57,252
Retail Trade	20,720	9.4	36,920
Transportation and Warehousing	4,567	2.1	59,488
Utilities	701	0.3	89,076
Wholesale Trade	7,335	3.3	86,944
Total	221,531	100.0%	58,839

== Transportation ==
=== Interstates ===
- I-20 (Interstate 20) travels from west to east and connects Columbia to Atlanta and Augusta in the west and Florence in the east. It serves the nearby towns and suburbs of Pelion, Lexington, West Columbia, Sandhill, Pontiac, and Elgin. Interstate 20 is also used by travelers heading to Myrtle Beach, although the interstate's eastern terminus is in Florence.
- I-26 (Interstate 26) travels from northwest to southeast and connects the Columbia area to the other two major population centers of South Carolina: the Greenville–Spartanburg area in the northwestern part of the state and the North Charleston–Charleston area in the southeastern part of the state.
- I-77 (Interstate 77) begins in Lexington county and ends in Cleveland, Ohio, and is frequently used by travelers on the east coast heading to or from Florida.
- I-126 (Interstate 126) branches off from I-26 and leads into downtown Columbia and provides access to Riverbanks Zoo.

=== U.S. routes ===
- US 1
- US 1 Conn.
- US 21
- US 21 Conn.
- US 76
- US 76 Conn.
- US 176
- US 321
- US 378
- US 601

=== State routes ===
- SC 6
- SC 7
- SC 12
- SC 12 Spur
- SC 16
- SC 40
- SC 48
- SC 48 Truck
- SC 215
- SC 262
- SC 263
- SC 269
- SC 277
- SC 555
- SC 764
- SC 768
- SC 768 Conn.

=== Airports ===
The Jim Hamilton–L.B. Owens Airport operates over 56,000 aircraft annually, but is a smaller airport used mostly for small and private planes. The main airport for the region is the Columbia Metropolitan Airport, which is located in neighboring Lexington County. In 2018, the Columbia Metro Airport served 1,197,603 passengers with 12,324 flights.

=== Bus systems ===
Public transportation in Richland County is provided by the COMET, or officially the Central Midlands Regional Transit Authority (CMRTA). The bus system is the main public transit system for the greater Columbia area and services approximately 2,800,000 passengers annually. In Richland County, the bus system runs in the areas of Columbia, Forest Acres, Fort Jackson, Irmo, St. Andrews, Northeast Richland, Lower Richland, and Eastover. Additionally, COMET offers Dial-a-ride transit (DART), which provides personalized service passengers with disabilities.

The University of South Carolina's transit system, which is maintained by COMET, services an additional 1,000,000 passengers annually.

=== Railway ===
Columbia has one Amtrak station (CLB) that serves over 30,000 passengers per year on the Silver Star rail line. Additionally, Richland County has an operating facility for CSX Transportation, a company that transports over one million carloads of freight on South Carolina's rail network.

=== Major infrastructure ===
- Columbia Station
- Fort Jackson (Note: Though within the city limits of Columbia, Fort Jackson operates autonomously with a private population and closed borders.)
- McEntire Joint National Guard Base, U.S. Air Force base (Note: The air base operates autonomously with a private population and closed borders.)

== Education ==
=== Public primary and secondary education ===
Public School Districts
Name	Enrollment	Notes
Richland School District 1	23,975	Central and southern portions of the county
Richland School District 2	28,303	Northeastern portions of the county
Lexington & Richland County School District Five	16,780	Northwestern portions of the county
Fort Jackson	Varies	The on-post areas of Fort Jackson are served by the Department of Defense Education Activity (DoDEA) for elementary grades, with District 2 serving that area for secondary grades.

=== Colleges and universities ===
Colleges and Universities (Note: In-person institutions only)
Name	Enrollment (Note: Part and full-time enrollment)	Notes
University of South Carolina	34,731	
Midlands Technical College	8,794	
Benedict College	2,090	HBCU
Medical University of South Carolina	3,312 (Note: System-wide)	Main Campus: Charleston
Columbia International University	2,039	
South University-Columbia	1,132	Main Campus: Savannah, Georgia
Columbia College	1,200	
Allen University	590	HBCU
Virginia College-Columbia	404	Main Campus: Birmingham, Alabama
Remington College-Columbia	272	Main Campus: Lafayette, Louisiana

=== Public library ===
Richland Library System
Branches	Circulation	Annual Visitors (counted once)
11	3,300,000	364,000

== Healthcare ==
Hospitals
Hospital	Approximate Annual Patients
Medical University of South Carolina: Downtown (Note: Formerly Providence Hospital)	1,000,000
Medical University of South Carolina: Northeast	1,000,000
Prisma Health Baptist: Taylor and Marion Streets	1,500,000
Prisma Health Baptist: Parkridge	1,500,000
Prisma Health: Richland	1,500,000
William Jennings Bryan Dorn Veterans Affairs Medical Center	1,130,000
Moncrief Army Community Hospital	400,000
Lexington Medical Center: Northeast	

== Attractions ==
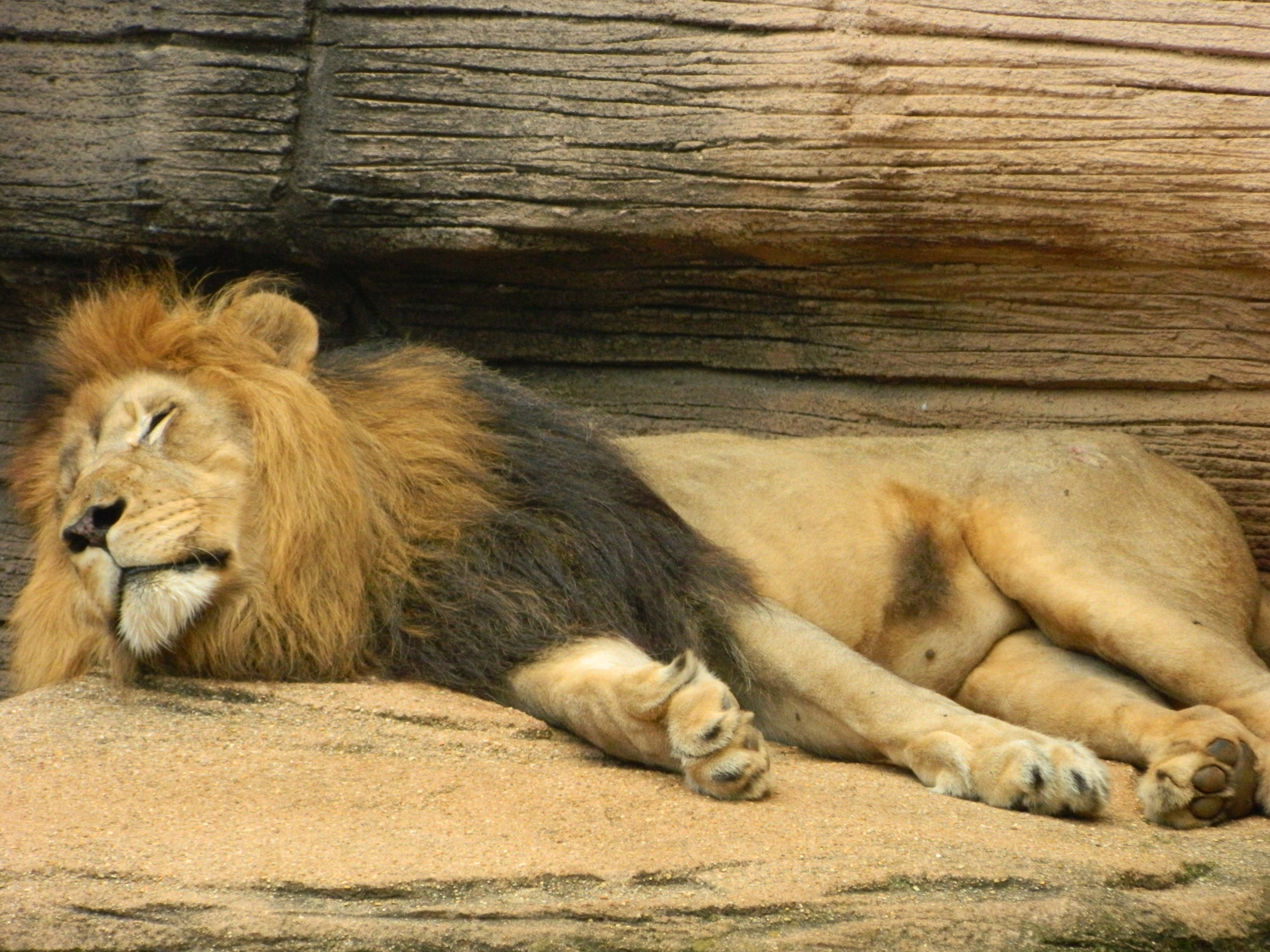
A male lion at Riverbanks Zoo

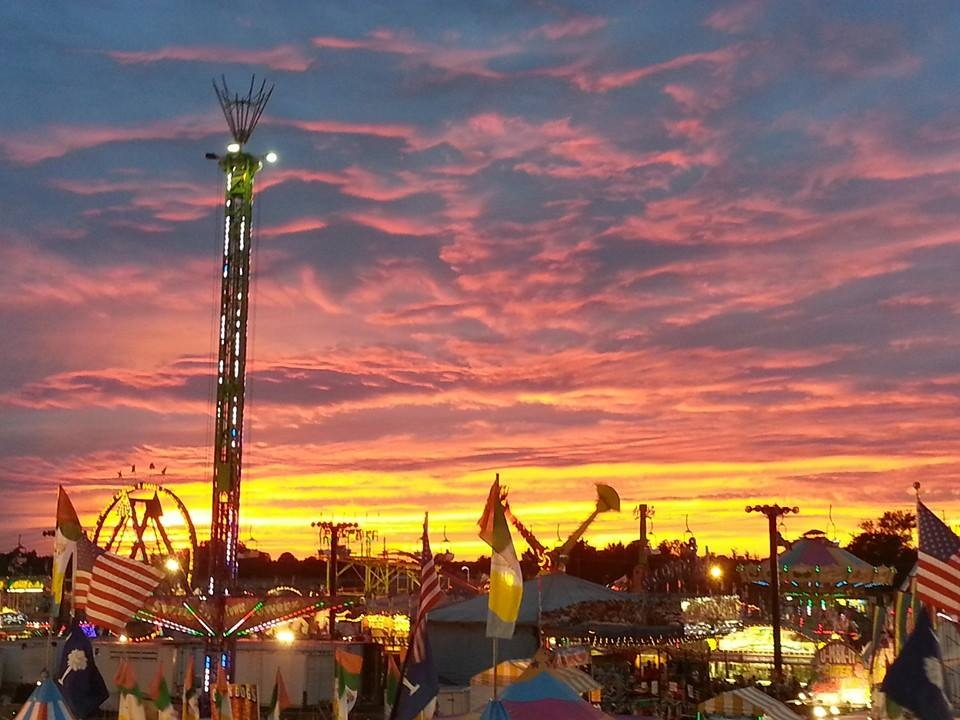
South Carolina State Fair

- Congaree National Park
- Fort Jackson National Cemetery
- Harbison State Forest
- Lake Murray
- Palmetto Trail
- Richland Library
- Riverbanks Zoo
- Sesquicentennial State Park
- South Carolina State Fair
- South Carolina State Museum

== Communities ==
=== Cities ===
- Cayce (mostly in Lexington County)
- Columbia (state capital, county seat, and largest community in the county; partly in Lexington County)
- Forest Acres

=== Towns ===
- Arcadia Lakes
- Blythewood (partly in Fairfield County)
- Eastover
- Elgin (mostly in Kershaw County)
- Irmo (mostly in Lexington County)

=== Census-designated places ===
- Arthurtown
- Capitol View
- Dentsville
- Gadsden
- Hopkins
- Olympia
- St. Andrews
- Woodfield

=== Unincorporated communities ===
- Bookman
- Horrell Hill
- Pontiac
- Wateree

=== Neighborhoods ===
- Boyden Arbor
- Cedar Creek
- Eau Claire
- Fairwold Acres
- Killian
- Kingville
- Leesburg
- Lykes
- Mountain Brook
- Riverside
- Spring Hill
- State Park
- Wateree
- Windsor Estates

=== Regions ===
- Dutch Fork
- Fort Jackson
- Intown/downtown
- Lower Richland
- Northeast Richland
- Upper Richland

=== Population ranking ===
The population ranking of the following table is based on the 2020 census of Richland County.

† = county seat

Rank	Name	Type	Population (2020 census)
1	† Columbia	City	136,632
2	St. Andrews	CDP	20,675
3	Dentsville	CDP	14,431
4	Cayce	City	13,781
5	Irmo	Town	11,569
6	Forest Acres	City	10,617
7	Woodfield	CDP	9,199
9	Blythewood	Town	4,772
10	Capitol View	CDP	4,653
11	Arthurtown	CDP	2,294
12	Hopkins	CDP	2,514
13	Elgin	Town	1,634
14	Gadsden	CDP	1,301
15	Olympia	CDP	1,087
16	Arcadia Lakes	Town	865
17	Eastover	Town	614

== In popular culture ==
Richland County was one of several counties across the country used as a filming location for the A&E reality documentary series Live PD, which worked in collaboration with the Richland County Sheriff's Department. The show first premiered in 2016 and aired for four years until its cancellation in 2020. In 2022, an unofficial revival of the show, On Patrol: Live, aired on Reelz. It features Curtis Wilson from the Richland County Sheriff's Department as well as the Berkeley County Sheriff's Office.

== See also ==
- List of counties in South Carolina
- National Register of Historic Places listings in Richland County, South Carolina
- Birch County, South Carolina, proposed county that would include existing portions of Richland County
- Eastern Cherokee, Southern Iroquois, and United Tribes of South Carolina, state-recognized group that resides in the county
- Natchez Indian Tribe of South Carolina, state-recognized group that resides in the county
