= South Carolina Highway 768 =

State highway in South Carolina, United States

South Carolina Highway 768

Route information
- Maintained by SCDOT
- Length: 4.880 mi (7.854 km)
- Existed: 1982–present

Major junctions
- West end: SC 48 in Columbia
- I-77 in Columbia
- East end: US 76 / US 378 near Columbia

Location
- Country: United States
- State: South Carolina
- Counties: Richland

Highway system
- South Carolina State Highway System; Interstate; US; State; Scenic
← SC 764	→ SC 769

South Carolina Highway 768 (SC 768) is a 4.880-mile (7.854 km) primary state highway in the U.S. state of South Carolina. It serves to connect businesses along Shop Road to nearby state highways.

== Route description ==
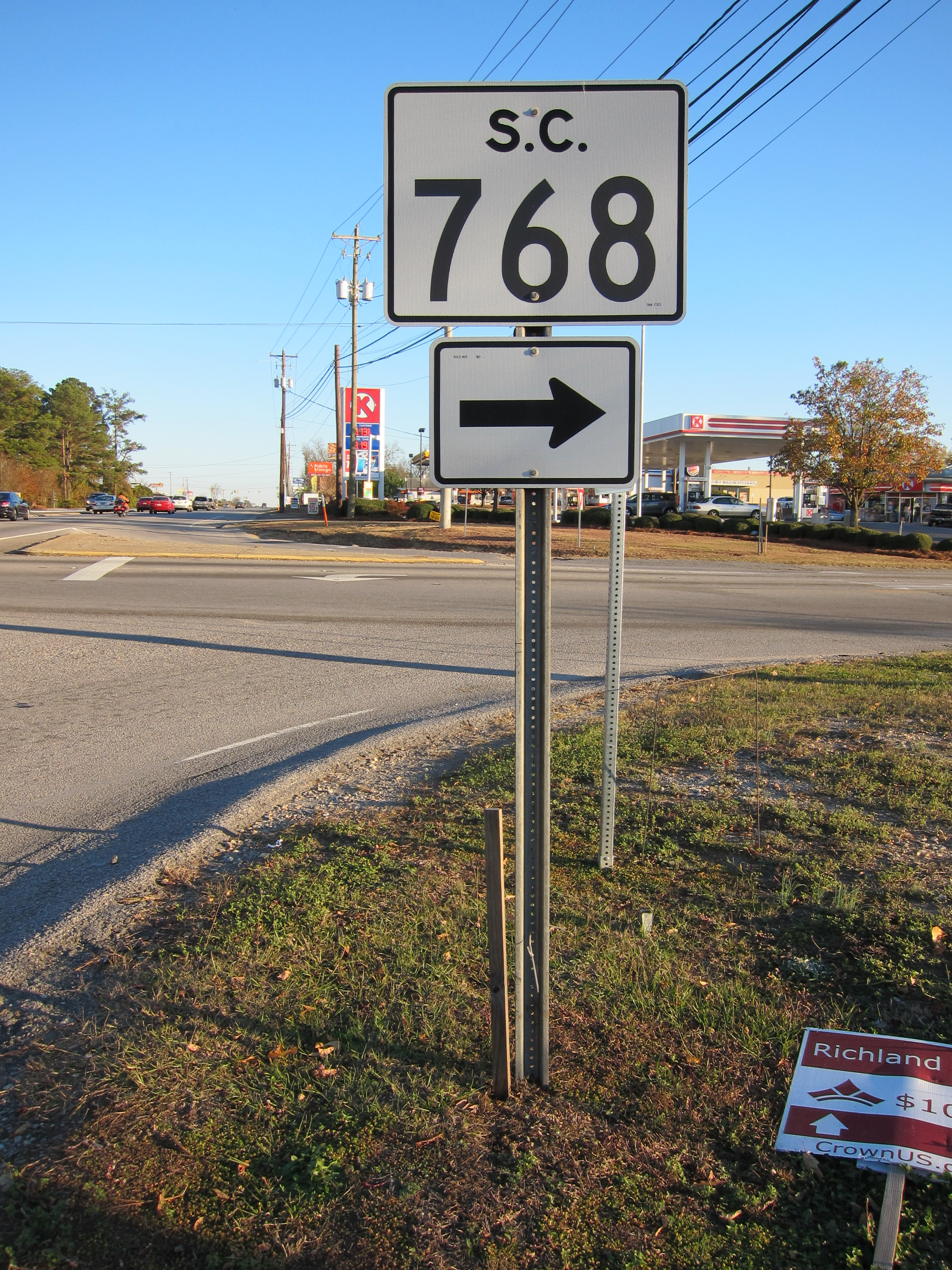
Signage for SC 768 along US 76/US 378 (Garners Ferry Road)

SC 768 is an urban highway that zig-zags from SC 48 to U.S. Route 76 (US 76) and 378. The main stretch is Shop Road, where it is a four-lane divided highway and has an interchange with Interstate 77 (I-77); while Beltline Boulevard and Pineview Road are a two-lane with a median.

== History ==
The first SC 768 appeared from 1942-1948 as a spur off US 76, from Marion 4 miles (6.4 km) to Pitch Pot Swamp. It was downgraded to secondary status.

The current SC 768 was established between 1980–82, as a new primary routing; which has changed little since.

== Major intersections ==
The entire route is in Richland County.

Location	mi	km	Destinations	Notes
Arthurtown	0.000	0.000	SC 48 (Bluff Road) – Lancaster, Chester	Western terminus
Columbia	1.530– 1.590	2.462– 2.559	I-77 – Charleston, Charlotte	I-77 exit 6
Columbia	2.970	4.780	Shop Road Extension south (SC 768 Conn. east) / Pineview Drive south	Western terminus of SC 768 Conn.; northern terminus of Shop Road Extension and Pineview Drive; SC 768 turns left, off of Shop Road, and onto Pineview Road.
Eastmont	4.880	7.854	US 76 / US 378 north (Garners Ferry Road) / Hallbrook Drive – Sumter	Eastern terminus; roadway continues as Hallbrook Drive.
1.000 mi = 1.609 km; 1.000 km = 0.621 mi

== Columbia connector route ==
South Carolina Highway 768 Connector
- Location: Columbia, South Carolina
- Length: 1.059 mi (1.704 km)

South Carolina Highway 768 Connector (SC 768 Conn.) is a connector route of SC 768 between the mainline (Shop Road / Pineview Road) and Longwood Road, south-southeast of Columbia. It is known as Shop Road Extension and is an unsigned highway.
