= South Carolina Highway 769 =

State highway in South Carolina, US

South Carolina Highway 769

Route information
- Maintained by SCDOT
- Length: 9.590 mi (15.434 km)

Major junctions
- South end: SC 48 in Gadsden
- North end: US 76 / US 378 in Horrell Hill

Location
- Country: United States
- State: South Carolina
- Counties: Richland

Highway system
- South Carolina State Highway System; Interstate; US; State; Scenic
← SC 768	→ SC 773

South Carolina Highway 769 (SC 769) is a 9.590-mile-long (15.434 km) state highway in the U.S. state of South Carolina. The highway connects Gadsden and Horrell Hill.

== Route description ==
SC 769 begins at an intersection with SC 48 (Bluff Road) in Gadsden, Richland County. It travels to the north-northeast and curves to the northwest. It crosses over Dry Branch and travels through Congaree. Just past the intersection with Gus Lane, the highway heads to the west-northwest and parallels some railroad tracks and the southern edge of McEntire Joint National Guard Base. Just past its crossing of Cedar Creek, it leaves the base. It turns to the right and heads to the north and crosses over the aforementioned railroad tracks. It then parallels Cedar Creek. It heads to the northwest and enters Horrell Hill, where it meets its northern terminus, an intersection with U.S. Route 76 (US 76) and US 378 (Garners Ferry Road).

== Major intersections ==
The entire route is in Richland County.

Location	mi	km	Destinations	Notes
Gadsden	0.000	0.000	SC 48 (Bluff Road) – Columbia	Southern terminus
Horrell Hill	9.590	15.434	US 76 / US 378 (Garners Ferry Road) – Columbia, Sumter	Northern terminus
1.000 mi = 1.609 km; 1.000 km = 0.621 mi
