= Horrell Hill, South Carolina =

Horrell Hill
- unincorporated community
- Interactive map of Horrell Hill
- Coordinates: 33°57′14″N 80°50′31″W
- Country: United States
- State: South Carolina
- County: Richland County
- Named for: Thomas Horrell
- Elevation: 111 m (364 ft)

Population (2000)
  - Total: 11,439
- Time zone: EST
- Area code: 803
- GNIS feature ID: 1246064

Horrell Hill is an unincorporated community in Lower Richland County, South Carolina, United States. Situated south of Fort Jackson and northwest of McEntire Joint National Guard Base, it is centered at approximately the intersection of Garner's Ferry Road (U.S. Route 76/378) and Harmon Road/Horrell Hill Road (SC 86). Congaree Road (SC 769) meets Garner's Ferry Road about 120 meters to the east.

== History ==
Settled in the 1770s, and originally called Meyer's (or Myer's) Hill, it was site of the county courthouse of Richland County from 1785 to 1799. When the county seat was transferred to the new city of Columbia, the courthouse was then used for a grammar school.

A number of different names were applied to the area or parts of the area, including Minervaville. Eventually it came to be named for plantation owner Thomas Horrell.

Just before noon on April 30, 1924, Horrell Hill was struck by the F4 Horrell Hill Tornado, the worst in the state's history. Running for 135 miles, it killed 67 people, including 24 in Horrell Hill. Four children died in Horrell Hill Elementary School when the storm demolished it.

Today Horrell Hill has two schools, Horrell Hill Elementary School and Southeast Middle School, operated by Richland County School District One.
