= Arthurtown, South Carolina =

- Census-designated place
- South Carolina Military Museum

- Location within South Carolina Location within the United States
- Coordinates: 33°57′46″N 80°59′52″W
- Country: United States
- State: South Carolina
- County: Richland

Area
  - Total: 1.86 sq mi (4.82 km^{2})
  - Land: 1.86 sq mi (4.82 km^{2})
  - Water: 0.0039 sq mi (0.01 km^{2})
- Elevation: 167 ft (51 m)

Population (2020)
  - Total: 2,294
  - Density: 1,230/sq mi (476/km^{2})
- Time zone: UTC-5 (Eastern (EST))
  - Summer (DST): UTC-4 (EDT)
- ZIP Code: 29201 (Columbia)
- Area codes: 803/839
- FIPS code: 45-02665
- GNIS feature ID: 2812987

Arthurtown is an unincorporated community and census-designated place (CDP) in Richland County, South Carolina, United States. It was listed appeared as a CDP prior to the 2020 census. Its population in 2020 was 2,294.

== Geography ==
The CDP is in western Richland County, bordered to the north, east, and west by the city of Columbia, the state capital, and to the south by the city of Cayce. South Carolina Highway 48 (Bluff Road) is the main road through Arthurtown, leading northwest 3 miles (5 km) to downtown Columbia and southeast 16 miles (26 km) to Gadsden. Interstate 77 passes just south of Arthurtown, with access from Exit 5 at SC 48.

Arthurtown is located immediately southeast of Williams–Brice Stadium, the home football stadium of the South Carolina Gamecocks. The fraternity lot, a popular tailgating venue unaffiliated with the University of South Carolina, is located within the CDP.

The headquarters of the South Carolina National Guard are located off of National Guard Road within Arthurtown along with the South Carolina Military Museum.

== Demographics ==
Historical population
Census	Pop.	Note	%±
2020	2,294		—
U.S. Decennial Census; 2020

Arthurtown first appeared as a census designated place in the 2020 U.S. census.

=== 2020 census ===
Arthurtown CDP, South Carolina – Racial and ethnic composition Note: the US Census treats Hispanic/Latino as an ethnic category. This table excludes Latinos from the racial categories and assigns them to a separate category. Hispanics/Latinos may be of any race.
Race / Ethnicity (NH = Non-Hispanic)	Pop. 2020	% 2020
White alone (NH)	868	37.84%
Black or African American alone (NH)	1,165	50.78%
Native American or Alaska Native alone (NH)	5	0.22%
Asian alone (NH)	71	3.10%
Native Hawaiian or Pacific Islander alone (NH)	0	0.00%
Other race alone (NH)	24	1.05%
Mixed race or Multiracial (NH)	67	2.92%
Hispanic or Latino (any race)	94	4.10%
Total	2,294	100.00%
