= Capitol View, South Carolina =

- Unincorporated community and Census designated place
- Location within South Carolina Location within the United States
- Coordinates: 33°57′59″N 80°55′24″W
- Country: United States
- State: South Carolina
- County: Richland

Area
  - Total: 1.67 sq mi (4.33 km^{2})
  - Land: 1.64 sq mi (4.25 km^{2})
  - Water: 0.031 sq mi (0.08 km^{2})
- Elevation: 266 ft (81 m)

Population (2020)
  - Total: 4,653
  - Density: 2,838.6/sq mi (1,095.99/km^{2})
- Time zone: UTC-5 (Eastern (EST))
  - Summer (DST): UTC-4 (EDT)
- ZIP Code: 29209 (Columbia)
- Area codes: 803/839
- FIPS code: 45-11620
- GNIS feature ID: 2807074

Capitol View is an unincorporated community and census designated place (CDP) in Richland County, South Carolina, United States, consisting of several neighborhoods that are next to the city of Columbia, the state capital. The area was first listed as a census-designated place (CDP) prior to the 2020 census. In 2020 its population was 4,653.

== Geography ==
The CDP is in central Richland County and is bordered to the north, west, and south by the city of Columbia. It is bordered to the east by Mill Creek and Sun View Lake, a reservoir on the creek, which is a south-flowing tributary of the Congaree River. The CDP consists of the neighborhoods of Village Bond, Capitol View, and Hazelwood Acres in the northwest; Charlestown in the northeast; and Eastmont in the south. The northwest and northeast arms of the CDP are separated by the neighborhoods of Galaxy and Strathaven Forest, both within the Columbia city limits.

South Carolina Highway 262 (Leesburg Road) runs through the northern side of the CDP, leading west 1 mile (1.6 km) to Interstate 77 at Exit 9 and east 13 miles (21 km) along the southern edge of Fort Jackson to U.S. Route 601. U.S. Routes 76 and 378 (Garners Ferry Road) form the southern edge of the CDP, leading northwest 8 miles (13 km) to downtown Columbia and east 35 miles (56 km) to Sumter.

== Demographics ==
Historical population
Census	Pop.	Note	%±
2020	4,653		—
U.S. Decennial Census; 2020

Capitol View first appeared as a census designated place in the 2020 U.S. census.

=== 2020 census ===
As of the 2020 census, Capitol View had a population of 4,653. The median age was 36.0 years. 22.9% of residents were under the age of 18 and 14.5% were 65 years of age or older. For every 100 females there were 90.8 males, and for every 100 females age 18 and over there were 84.3 males age 18 and over.

100.0% of residents lived in urban areas, while 0.0% lived in rural areas.

There were 2,119 households, of which 28.2% had children under the age of 18 living in them. Of all households, 26.7% were married-couple households, 24.3% were households with a male householder and no spouse or partner present, and 41.0% were households with a female householder and no spouse or partner present. About 35.2% of all households were made up of individuals and 10.0% had someone living alone who was 65 years of age or older.

There were 2,263 housing units, of which 6.4% were vacant. The homeowner vacancy rate was 1.9% and the rental vacancy rate was 5.1%.

Capitol View CDP, South Carolina – Racial and ethnic composition Note: the US Census treats Hispanic/Latino as an ethnic category. This table excludes Latinos from the racial categories and assigns them to a separate category. Hispanics/Latinos may be of any race.
Race / Ethnicity (NH = Non-Hispanic)	Pop 2020	% 2020
White alone (NH)	1,486	31.94%
Black or African American alone (NH)	2,637	56.67%
Native American or Alaska Native alone (NH)	9	0.19%
Asian alone (NH)	52	1.12%
Native Hawaiian or Pacific Islander alone (NH)	3	0.06%
Other race alone (NH)	19	0.41%
Mixed race or Multiracial (NH)	152	3.27%
Hispanic or Latino (any race)	295	6.34%
Total	4,653	100.00%
