= Special routes of U.S. Route 76 =

Special routes of U.S. Route 76

Highway system
- United States Numbered Highway System; List; Special; Divided

Several special routes of U.S. Route 76 exist. In order from west to east they are as follows.

== Seneca business loop ==
U.S. Highway 76 Business
- Location: Seneca, South Carolina
- Existed: 1958–2000

U.S. Route 76 Business was established in 1958 as a renumbering of mainline US 76 through downtown Seneca, via North 1st Street. It was decommissioned in 2000, renumbered as part of SC 59 and SC 130.

== Laurens business loop ==
U.S. Highway 76 Business
- Location: Laurens, South Carolina
- Length: 3.910 mi (6.293 km)
- Existed: 1979–present

U.S. Route 76 Business (US 76 Bus.) is a 3.910 mi (6.293 km) business route that is in Laurens. It was established in 1979 on the former route of mainline US 76 through downtown Laurens on Main Street after the highway was relocated to a bypass. The entire route is two-lane.

== Newberry business loop ==
U.S. Highway 76 Business
- Location: Newberry, South Carolina
- Existed: 1952–2001

U.S. Route 76 Business was established in 1959 as a renumbering of mainline US 76 through downtown Newberry, via College Street, Main Street, Glenn Street, and Adelaide Street. It was decommissioned in 2001, all becoming secondary roads, with exception to northern part of College Street being part of SC 121.

== Columbia connector route ==
U.S. Highway 76 Connector
- Location: Columbia, South Carolina
- Length: 4.440 mi (7.145 km)

U.S. Route 76 Connector (US 76 Conn.) is a 4.440 mi-long (7.145 km) connector route of US 76 that is an unsigned highway. It exists in three different segments and is located in the west-central part of Richland County and entirely within the city limits of Columbia in the U.S. state of South Carolina. It connects US 21/US 76/US 321 with US 76/US 378. The western segment is concurrent with SC 48 Truck and US 21 Conn. for its entire length. The central segment is known as Cross Hill Road for its entire length.

The western segment of US 76 Conn. is a 2.9 mi-long (4.7 km) highway that begins at an intersection with US 21/US 176/US 321 (Blossom Street/Huger Street). It travels to the east-northeast on Blossom Street. It crosses over some railroad tracks of CSX. It passes Greek Village, the fraternities and sororities of the University of South Carolina (USC). Right after passing the Carolina Coliseum, it intersects South Carolina Highway 48 (SC 48; Assembly Street). The highway passes the Carolina Community Garden at the Honors Residence Hall. Then, it passes the Thomas Cooper Library and then the Booker T. Washington Auditorium. It curves to the northeast and travels along the northwestern edge of Maxcy Gregg Park. This is southeast of the USC tennis courts at Blossom Street. The connector curves to the east and travels under a railroad bridge that carries railroad tracks of Norfolk Southern Railway. It curves to the southeast. At the intersection with Saluda Avenue, the highway turns left and travels to the northeast. One block later, at Devine Street, it turns right and travels to the east-northeast. At an intersection with Harden Street, it curves to the east-southeast and travels through a retail area before meeting its eastern terminus, an intersection with US 76/US 378 (Millwood Avenue/Devine Street).

The central segment of US 76 Conn. is a 0.4 mi-long (640 m) highway that begins at an intersection with SC 16 (Beltline Boulevard) southwest of Brennen Elementary School. It travels to the south-southeast and curves to the south-southwest. It curves back to the south-southeast and meets its eastern terminus, an intersection with US 76/US 378 (Devine Street) and the western terminus of SC 760 (Fort Jackson Boulevard).

The eastern segment of US 76 Conn. is a 1.1 mi-long (1.8 km) highway that begins at an intersection with SC 16 (Rosewood Drive/Beltline Boulevard) southwest of the eastern terminus of the central segment of the connector route. It travels east-southeast on Rosewood Drive and passes the Beltline Campus of Midlands Technical College. It curves to the east-northeast and crosses over Gills Creek. It curves to the northeast and intersects US 76/US 378 (Devine Street/Garners Ferry Road). Here, the connector becomes known as Wildcat Road. The highway curves to the east-northeast and meets its eastern terminus, an intersection with SC 760 (Fort Jackson Boulevard).

The entire route is in Columbia, Richland County.

mi	km	Destinations	Notes
0.000	0.000	US 21 / US 176 / US 321 (Blossom Street / Huger Street)	Western end of US 21 Conn./SC 48 Truck concurrency; western terminus
0.580	0.933	SC 48 (Assembly Street)	Eastern end of SC 48 Truck concurrency; eastern terminus of SC 48 Truck
2.930	4.715	US 76 / US 378 (Millwood Avenue / Devine Street)	Eastern end of US 21 Conn. concurrency; eastern terminus of western segment
Gap in route
0.000	0.000	SC 16 (Beltline Boulevard)	Western terminus of central segment
0.470	0.756	US 76 / US 378 (Devine Street) / SC 760 east (Fort Jackson Boulevard)	Eastern terminus of central segment
Gap in route
0.000	0.000	SC 16 (Rosewood Drive / Beltline Boulevard)	Western terminus of eastern segment
0.590	0.950	US 76 / US 378 (Devine Street / Garners Ferry Road) – Sumter	
1.040	1.674	SC 760 (Fort Jackson Boulevard) – Ft. Jackson	Eastern terminus of eastern segment
1.000 mi = 1.609 km; 1.000 km = 0.621 mi: Concurrency terminus

== Sumter business loop ==
U.S. Highway 76 Business
- Location: Sumter, South Carolina
- Length: 5.910 mi (9.511 km)
- Existed: 1958–present

U.S. Route 76 Business (US 76 Bus.) is a 5.910 mi (9.511 km) business route that is entirely within the city limits of Sumter. It was established in 1958 as a renumbering of mainline US 76 through downtown Sumter, via Liberty Street, Washington Street, and Broad Street. US 76 now uses Pike road instead of going through downtown Sumter. The business route was originally co-signed with US 378 Business until that designation was deleted in 1973.

== Florence connector route ==
U.S. Highway 76 Connector
- Location: Florence, South Carolina
- Length: 0.140 mi (225 m)

U.S. Route 76 Connector (US 76 Conn.) is a connector route that is essentially an eastward extension of Interstate 20 Business (I-20 Bus.) in the western part of Florence. It serves to connect I-20 Bus. with US 76. It is an unsigned highway.

== Chadbourn–Whiteville business loop ==
U.S. Highway 76 Business
- Location: Chadbourn–Whiteville, North Carolina
- Length: 10.4 mi (16.7 km)
- Existed: February 1, 1976–present

U.S. Route 76 Business (US 76 Business) is a business route of US 76 running through Chadbourn and Whiteville. The highway runs for 10.4 mi (16.7 km) from US 76 north of Chadbourn to US 74 and US 76 northeast of Whiteville. US 76 Business is completely concurrent with US 74 Business. It also shares concurrencies with both NC 130 and NC 410 along portions of its route. US 76 Business was established by North Carolina on February 1, 1976, when US 76 was rerouted along a new bypass north of both Chadbourn and Whiteville. Its designation was then approved by the American Association of State Highway Officials in 1977. Accordingly, the highway follows the original alignment of US 76 through Chadbourn and Whiteville. A roundabout intersection with US 701 Business surrounds the Columbus County Courthouse which is listed on the National Register of Historic Places.

US 76 Business begins at an intersection with US 76, US 74 Business, NC 130, and NC 410 north of Chadbourn. From its terminus, US 76 Business travels south along Brown Street for 0.3 mi (480 m). At Strawberry Avenue, US 76 Business, US 74 Business, and NC 130 turn to follow the road to the southeast. NC 410 continues south along Brown Street toward downtown Chadbourn and Tabor City. US 76 Business between Brown Street and Elm Street is a four-lane undivided road. After intersecting Elm Street, the road narrows to a two-lane facility while following Strawberry Avenue in northern Chadbourn. Between Chadbourn and Whiteville, the highway is mostly rural. US 76 Business provides access to Southeastern Community College, located east of Chadbourn. The highway also intersects Union Valley Road and Midway Road, providing access to US 74 and US 76. US 76 Business enters Whiteville from the west, utilizing Washington Street. After Barbcrest Avenue, the road briefly widens to a four-lane undivided road, before narrowing to a three-lane road with two eastbound lanes and one westbound lane. The highway intersects US 701 (JK Powell Boulevard) west of downtown Whiteville. The intersection marks the eastern end of the NC 130 concurrency, as the highway follows US 701 to the south. In downtown Whiteville, US 76 Business intersects US 701 Business at a roundabout surrounding the Columbus County Courthouse. US 76 Business continues east along Jefferson Street, exiting the town limits. Shortly before its eastern terminus, the highway widens to a four-lane road and intersects NC 214. The highway continues for 0.1 mi (530 ft; 160 m) until reaching its eastern terminus at a US 74 and US 76.

Major intersections

The entire route is in Columbus County.

Location	mi	km	Destinations	Notes
Chadbourn	0.0	0.0	US 76 / US 74 Bus. / NC 130 / NC 410	Western terminus; western end of US 74 Bus. and NC 130 overlap; north end of NC 410 overlap
Chadbourn	0.3	0.48	NC 410 south	South end of NC 410 overlap
Whiteville	7.3	11.7	US 701 / NC 130 east	Eastern end of NC 130 overlap
Whiteville	7.6	12.2	US 701 Bus.	Roundabout
Whiteville	10.3	16.6	NC 214 east	Western terminus of NC 214
Whiteville	10.4	16.7	US 74 / US 76	Eastern terminus; eastern end of US 74 Bus. overlap
1.000 mi = 1.609 km; 1.000 km = 0.621 mi: Concurrency terminus

== Chadbourn temporary route ==
U.S. Highway 76 Temporary
- Location: Chadbourn
- Length: 0.4 mi (640 m)
- Existed: September 1, 1975–February 1, 1976

U.S. Route 76 Temporary (US 76 Temporary) was a 0.4 mi-long (640 m) temporary route along Union Valley Road between US 74 and US 76 and US 74, US 76, and NC 130 (Chadbourn Highway). The western terminus of US 76 Temporary was at the US 74 and US 76 freeway which bypassed Chadbourn. The highway ran in a southwest–northeast direction along Union Valley Road. Its eastern terminus was located at US 74, US 76, and NC 130. This was the former alignment of US 74 and US 76 which connected Chadbourn and Whiteville. US 76 Temporary ran concurrently with US 74 Temporary along its entire route.

US 76 Temporary was established on September 1, 1975, to link the newly constructed US 74 and US 76 freeway bypassing Chadbourn and the US 74 and US 76 alignment through Whiteville. It lasted for six months while construction of a new freeway around Whiteville was being completed. Upon the completion of the freeway on February 1, 1976, US 76 Temporary was decommissioned. The former alignment of US 74 and US 76 through Chadbourn and Whiteville became US 74 Business and US 76 Business.

Major intersections

The entire route was in Columbus County.

Location	mi	km	Destinations	Notes
Chadbourn	0.0	0.0	US 74 west / US 76 west	Western terminus
Chadbourn	0.4	0.64	US 74 east / US 76 east / NC 130	Eastern terminus
1.000 mi = 1.609 km; 1.000 km = 0.621 mi
