= South Carolina Highway 48 =

State highway in South Carolina, United States

South Carolina Highway 48

Route information
- Maintained by SCDOT
- Length: 28.980 mi (46.639 km)
- Existed: 1930–present

Major junctions
- West end: US 21 / US 76 / US 176 / US 321 in Columbia
- US 1 / US 378 in Columbia; I-77 in Columbia
- East end: US 601 in Wateree

Location
- Country: United States
- State: South Carolina
- Counties: Richland

Highway system
- South Carolina State Highway System; Interstate; US; State; Scenic
← SC 47	→ SC 49

South Carolina Highway 48 (SC 48) is a 28.980-mile (46.639 km) primary state highway in the U.S. state of South Carolina. It serves southern Richland County and access to the Congaree National Park.

== Route description ==
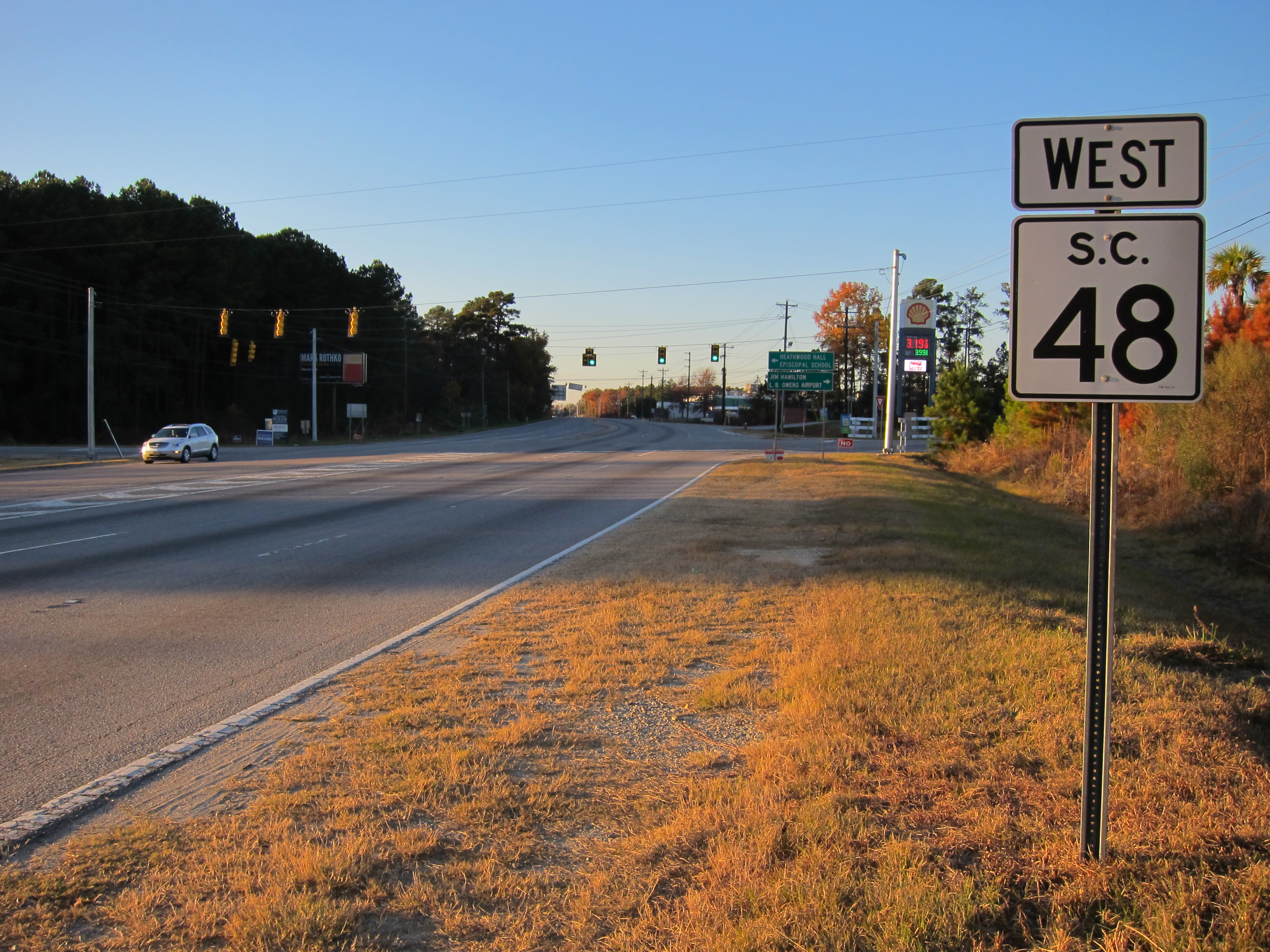
SC 48 west towards Columbia

SC 48 begins in downtown Columbia along Assembly Street. It traverses west, passing alongside the South Carolina State House and the University of South Carolina, before turning onto Rosewood Drive and then onto Bluff Road. After leaving the Columbia city limits, it continues through southeastern Richland County as a two-lane rural highway to U.S. Route 601 (US 601).

== History ==
Established in 1930 as a new primary routing, it originally traversed from Gervais Street, going east along Assembly Street, to US 601 in Wateree. Various adjustments in its downtown routing have been made between 1937-46. In 1950, SC 48 was straightened out between Gadsden and Wateree, leaving behind Old Bluff Road. In 1978, SC 48 was extended west to its current western terminus at Elmwood Avenue.

== Junction list ==
The entire route is in Richland County.

Location	mi	km	Destinations	Notes
Columbia	0.000	0.000	US 21 / US 76 / US 176 / US 321 (Elmwood Avenue) to I-77 / I-126 – Spartanburg, Greenville, Chester, Rock Hill	Western terminus
Columbia	0.489	0.787	SC 12 (Taylor Street) – Lexington, Ft. Jackson, Nickelodeon Theater	
Columbia	0.882	1.419	US 1 / US 378 (Gervais Street) – State House	
Columbia	1.481	2.383	Blossom Street (US 21 Conn. / US 76 Conn. / SC 48 Truck west) to US 21 south / US 176 east / US 321 south – Ft. Jackson, Sumter, Colonial Life Arena	Eastern terminus of SC 48 Truck; provides access to Columbia Metropolitan Airport
Columbia	2.474	3.982	SC 16 north (Rosewood Drive north) / George Rogers Boulevard south – Jim Hamilton–L.B. Owens Airport, Williams–Brice Stadium	Southern terminus of SC 16 and Assembly Street; northern terminus of George Rogers Boulevard; SC 48 turns right off of Assembly Street and onto Rosewood Drive.
Columbia	5.363	8.631	SC 768 east (Beltline Boulevard) – Jim Hamilton–L.B. Owens Airport, Heathwood Hall Episcopal School	Western terminus of SC 768
Columbia	5.589	8.995	I-77 to I-26 – Charleston, Spartanburg, Charlotte	I-77 exit 5; Isadore E. Lourie Interchange
Gadsden	21.180	34.086	SC 769 north (Congaree Road) to US 76 – Congaree, Gadsden Elementary School	Southern terminus of SC 769
Wateree	28.980	46.639	US 601 (McCords Ferry Road) – St. Matthews, Orangeburg, Camden	Eastern terminus
1.000 mi = 1.609 km; 1.000 km = 0.621 mi

== Columbia truck route ==
South Carolina Highway 48 Truck
- Location: Columbia, South Carolina
- Length: 0.580 mi (933 m)

South Carolina Highway 48 Truck (SC 48 Truck) is a 0.580-mile (0.933 km) truck route of SC 48 that exists entirely within the southwestern part of Columbia. It is mostly unsigned, except for a sign at its western terminus. It is also concurrent with U.S. Route 21 Connector (US 21 Conn.) and the western segment of US 76 Conn., which are both also unsigned. All three highways take Blossom Street between US 21/US 176/US 321, from where they turn left off of Blossom Street and onto Huger Street, and SC 48 (Assembly Street).
