= Woodfield, South Carolina =

- Census-designated place
- Location in Richland County and the state of South Carolina.
- Coordinates: 34°03′31″N 80°55′51″W
- Country: United States
- State: South Carolina
- County: Richland

Area
  - Total: 2.78 sq mi (7.20 km^{2})
  - Land: 2.74 sq mi (7.10 km^{2})
  - Water: 0.039 sq mi (0.10 km^{2})
- Elevation: 341 ft (104 m)

Population (2020)
  - Total: 9,199
  - Density: 3,353.6/sq mi (1,294.83/km^{2})
- Time zone: UTC-5 (Eastern (EST))
  - Summer (DST): UTC-4 (EDT)
- FIPS code: 45-78820
- GNIS feature ID: 2403038

Woodfield is a census-designated place (CDP) in Richland County, South Carolina, United States. The population was 9,303 at the 2010 census. It is part of the Columbia, South Carolina Metropolitan Statistical Area.

The former Decker Mall, located near Woodfield along Decker Boulevard, closed in 2011. The property was later redeveloped for Richland County government offices.

== Geography ==
According to the United States Census Bureau, the CDP has a total area of 2.8 square miles (7.2 km^{2}), of which 2.7 square miles (7.1 km^{2}) is land and 0.04 square miles (0.1 km^{2}), or 1.36%, is water.

== Demographics ==
Historical population
| Census | Pop. | Note | %± |
|---|---|---|---|
| 2000 | 9,238 | | — |
| 2010 | 9,303 | | 0.7% |
| 2020 | 9,199 | | −1.1% |
U.S. Decennial Census

=== Racial and ethnic composition ===
Woodfield CDP, South Carolina – Racial and ethnic composition Note: the US Census treats Hispanic/Latino as an ethnic category. This table excludes Latinos from the racial categories and assigns them to a separate category. Hispanics/Latinos may be of any race.
| Race / Ethnicity (NH = Non-Hispanic) | Pop 2000 | Pop 2010 | Pop 2020 | % 2000 | % 2010 | % 2020 |
|---|---|---|---|---|---|---|
| White alone (NH) | 3,372 | 2,246 | 1,548 | 36.50% | 24.14% | 16.83% |
| Black or African American alone (NH) | 4,397 | 4,685 | 5,095 | 47.60% | 50.36% | 55.39% |
| Native American or Alaska Native alone (NH) | 42 | 32 | 19 | 0.45% | 0.34% | 0.21% |
| Asian alone (NH) | 424 | 289 | 262 | 4.59% | 3.11% | 2.85% |
| Native Hawaiian or Pacific Islander alone (NH) | 22 | 28 | 16 | 0.24% | 0.30% | 0.17% |
| Other race alone (NH) | 19 | 8 | 41 | 0.21% | 0.09% | 0.45% |
| Mixed race or Multiracial (NH) | 180 | 215 | 322 | 1.95% | 2.31% | 3.50% |
| Hispanic or Latino (any race) | 782 | 1,800 | 1,896 | 8.47% | 19.35% | 20.61% |
| Total | 9,238 | 9,303 | 9,199 | 100.00% | 100.00% | 100.00% |

=== 2020 census ===
As of the 2020 United States census, there were 9,199 people, 3,764 households, and 2,201 families residing in the CDP.

=== 2000 census ===
As of the census of 2000, there were 9,238 people, 3,621 households, and 2,429 families residing in the CDP. The population density was 3,312.5 inhabitants per square mile (1,279.0/km^{2}). There were 3,957 housing units at an average density of 1,418.9 per square mile (547.8/km^{2}). The racial makeup of the CDP was 40.19% White, 48.29% African American, 0.47% Native American, 4.67% Asian, 0.24% Pacific Islander, 3.68% from other races, and 2.47% from two or more races. Hispanic or Latino of any race were 8.47% of the population.

There were 3,621 households, out of which 31.8% had children under the age of 18 living with them, 44.0% were married couples living together, 19.2% had a female householder with no husband present, and 32.9% were non-families. 27.0% of all households were made up of individuals, and 6.2% had someone living alone who was 65 years of age or older. The average household size was 2.51 and the average family size was 3.02.

In the CDP, the population was spread out, with 25.0% under the age of 18, 10.1% from 18 to 24, 31.2% from 25 to 44, 20.9% from 45 to 64, and 12.9% who were 65 years of age or older. The median age was 35 years. For every 100 females, there were 86.4 males. For every 100 females age 18 and over, there were 82.6 males.

The median income for a household in the CDP was $37,775, and the median income for a family was $42,500. Males had a median income of $30,804 versus $25,618 for females. The per capita income for the CDP was $18,479. About 8.2% of families and 11.0% of the population were below the poverty line, including 13.6% of those under age 18 and 9.4% of those age 65 or over.
