= Sesquicentennial State Park =

State Park in South Carolina

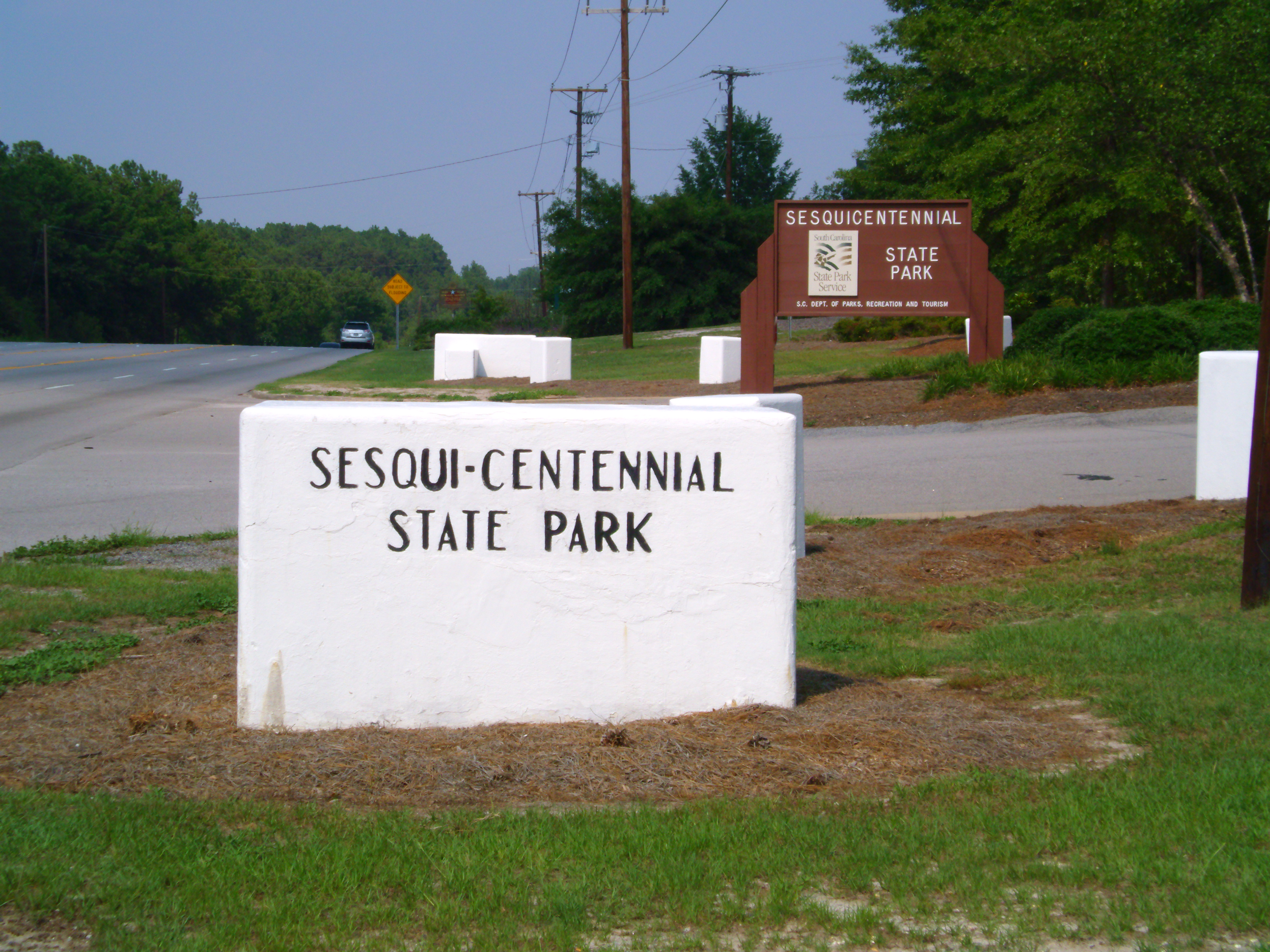
- Interactive map of Sesquicentennial State Park
- Nearest city: Columbia, SC
- Coordinates: 34°05′17″N 80°54′15″W
- Area: 1,419 acres (5.74 km^{2})
- Created: 1937
- Camp sites: Regular campgrounds and RV sites
- Hiking trails: Sandhills Hiking trail; Jackson Creek Nature trail; Loop Road trail; Sesqui Mountain Bike trail
- Other information: Features include hiking trails, bicycling trails, softball field, splash pad, fishing, meeting facilities, dog park, and various styled boat rentals.
- Website: https://southcarolinaparks.com/sesqui

Sesquicentennial State Park, commonly referred to as "Sesqui" (/sɛskwɪ/), is a state park located in the Sandhills region of South Carolina. The park covers 1,419 acres (5.74 km^{2}) and is situated approximately 12 miles (19 km) from downtown Columbia, South Carolina.

== History ==
The park was established due to Columbia's Sesquicentennial Celebration in 1936. The Sesquicentennial Commission used surplus funds to purchase 1,445 acres of land in 1937. This land was transferred to the Commission of Forestry, and the Civilian Conservation Corps (CCC) Company #4469 was assigned to develop the park. They would build many of the park's buildings, as well as the stone entrance.

== Amenities ==
The park offers a variety of recreational opportunities, including three picnic shelters, four picnic pads, and 84 campsites. Visitors have access to rental services for fishing boats, paddle boats, standup paddle boards, kayaks, and canoes. The park grants fishing access to a 30-acre (12 ha) lake within the park. The park also includes 12 miles (19 km) of trails for hiking and mountain biking.

Key trails within the park include the Sandhills hiking trail, a two-mile (3.2 km) ADA-accessible loop around the lake, and the Sesqui Mountain Bike Trail, which covers 6.5 miles (10.5 km) of terrain with varying elevation and sandy conditions.

Additional facilities at the park consist of a splash pad, which is closed during the winter months, and a dog park.
