= Bookman (Caribbean folklore) =

The Bookman is one of several types of Devil represented in Trinidad Carnival. He typically carries a large book and a pen, with which he mimes writing the names of passersby into the book of damned souls.

== Sources ==
- Nunley, John and Judith Bettleheim. Caribbean Festival Arts: Each and Every Bit of Difference. University of Washington Press, 1998.
- Dudley, Shannon. Music from behind the bridge: steelband spirit and politics in Trinidad and Tobago. Oxford University Press, 2008. ISBN 978-0195175479. Excerpts available at Google Books.
