= Bookman, South Carolina =

Former settlement in South Carolina, United States

Coordinates: 34°09′47″N 81°09′11″W

Bookman is an extinct town in Richland County, in the U.S. state of South Carolina. The GNIS classifies it as a populated place.

== History ==
A post office called Bookman was established in 1880, and remained in operation until 1937. The community was named after Carroll Bookman, a local merchant.

In 1925, Bookman had 35 inhabitants.
