= Wateree, South Carolina =

Coordinates: 33°48′26″N 80°38′14″W

Wateree is an unincorporated community in Richland County, in the U.S. state of South Carolina.

== History ==
A post office called Wateree was established in 1852, and remained in operation until 1963. The community was named after the Wateree people.
