= Richland Northeast High School =

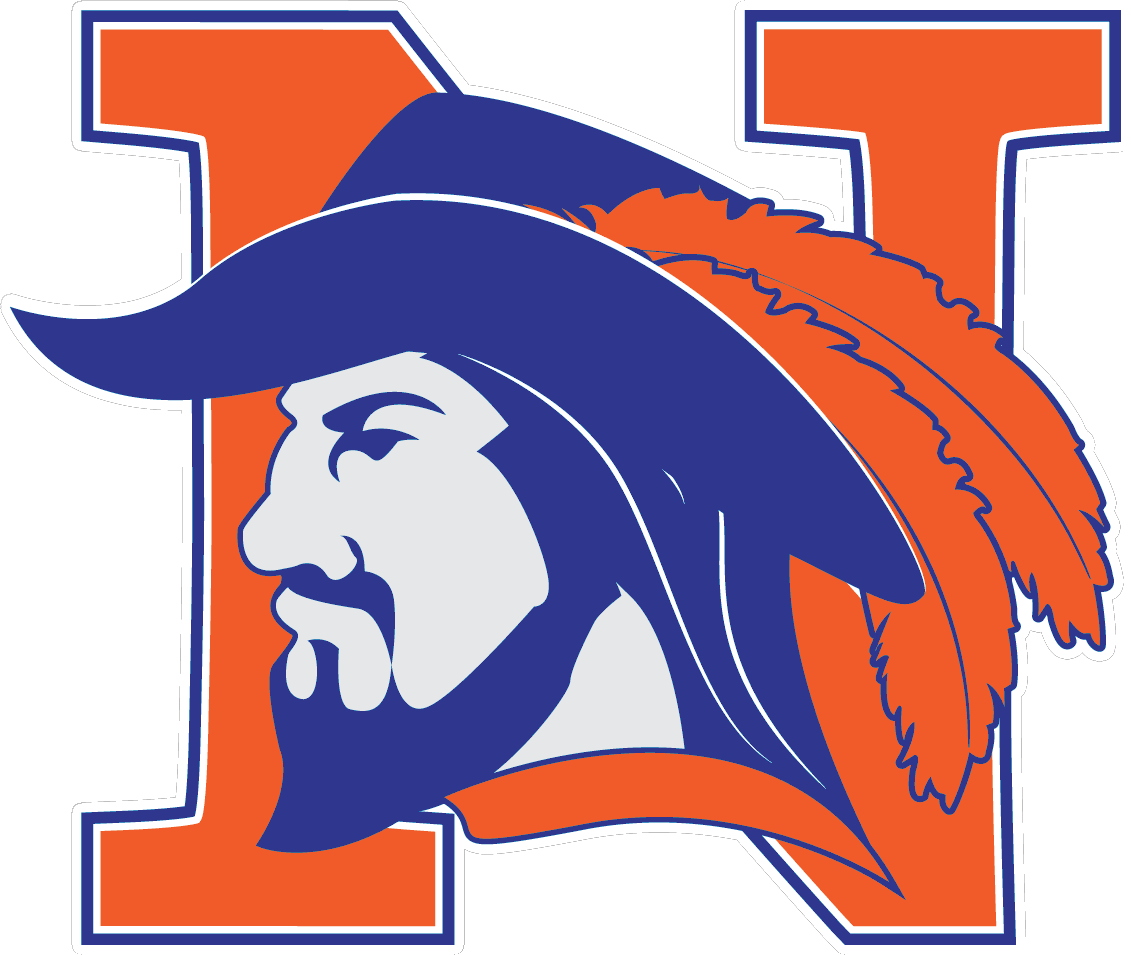

Location
- 7500 Brookfield Road; Columbia, South Carolina 29223

Information
- Type: Public
- Established: 1978 (48 years ago)
- School district: Richland School District Two
- NCES School ID: 450339001312
- Principal: Marlon Thomas
- Teaching staff: 100.20 (FTE)
- Grades: 9–12
- Enrollment: approx. 1 300 (2025)
- Student to teacher ratio: 12.98
- Campus type: Suburban
- Colors: Orange and Blue
- Slogan: A School Where Joy Resides
- Athletics: South Carolina High School League
- Athletics conference: Class 4A - Region 4
- Mascot: Cavalier
- Website: https://www.rnh.richland2.org

Richland Northeast High School (often abbreviated as RNE, RNH, or RNHS) is a four-year public secondary school located on Brookfield Road in Columbia in South Carolina, United States. Founded in 1978, the school is known for its specialized programs in the arts, media and global academics. As of 2025, the school has approximately 1 300 pupils enrolled.

== Governance ==
It is one of five high schools in Richland School District Two.

== Curriculum ==
=== AVID ===
The Advancement Via Individual Determination (AVID) prepares students for college and career readiness and success in a global society.

=== CavPlex Convergence Media ===
CavPlex Convergence Media is an academic elective magnet with focuses on multimedia journalism. CavPlex students participate in the student media at Richland Northeast: The Archive (yearbook); Tapestry (literary magazine); RNE-TV Live (broadcast); and The Saber (online news and social media).

=== Horizon ===
The Horizon magnet program is a rigorous learning community for academically talented students.

=== Palmetto Center for the Arts (PCA) ===
The Palmetto Center for the Arts (PCA) is the visual and performing arts magnet at Richland Northeast. The program, which includes dance, music, theatre and visual arts, is nationally recognized as a National School of Distinction in Arts Education by the John F. Kennedy Center and is the recipient of the John F. Kennedy Center Creative Ticket Award for outstanding achievement in arts education. Arts disciplines include dance, vocal music, orchestra, band, theatre, photography, ceramics and sculpture.

== Sport and extracurricular activities ==
Richland Northeast High School competes in the South Carolina High School League (SCHSL) and is currently classified as a Class 4A institution, placed in Region 4 for the 2026–2028 realignment cycle. The school’s sports program, known as the Cavaliers, offers a comprehensive range of junior varsity and varsity sports across three seasons.

- Fall Sports: Football, Volleyball, Cross Country, Girls Tennis, Girls Golf, Swimming, and Cheerleading.
- Winter Sports: Boys and Girls Basketball and Wrestling.
- Spring Sports: Baseball, Softball, Boys and Girls Soccer, Boys Tennis, Boys Golf, and Track and Field.

=== Student Senate ===
The Student Government Association (SGA), often referred to as the Student Senate, is a prominent organization that has received consistent national and regional acclaim. In 2026, the council was named a Gold Honor Council by the South Carolina Association of Student Councils (SCASC) and earned several top honors at the Southern Association of Student Councils (SASC) conference, including 1st Place in Community Service & Outreach (4A) and School Spirit and Pride (4A), as well as 2nd Place in School Recreational Activities (4A). These accolades follow a history of excellence, including being named a National Gold Council of Excellence by the National Association of Student Councils for four consecutive years (2021–2024) and achieving Diamond Member School status with the SASC in 2024.

=== Other activities ===
The school’s Mock Trial program is also highly competitive; in 2026, the team ranked 4th in the state at the South Carolina Bar competition. The program is specifically recognized for its ethical conduct, having received the Professionalism and Civility Award from the South Carolina Bar in both 2023 and 2024.

Additionally, the HOSA – Future Health Professionals (formerly Health Occupations Students of America) chapter has seen significant individual success at the SC HOSA State Leadership Conference. In 2026, students secured 3rd Place in Health Informatics and 5th Place in Medical Spelling, qualifying them for advanced competition.

== Notable alumni ==
=== Sport ===
- T. J. Brunson – an American football linebacker for the New York Giants of the National Football League (NFL). He played college football at South Carolina.

=== Arts and media ===
- Pi'erre Bourne – Record producer, rapper, and audio engineer
- Danny! – recording artist for Okayplayer Records and music producer/composer for MTV's Hype Music production library
- JetsonMade – Record producer and songwriter
- Leroy Miller – Musician, songwriter, record producer

=== Politics and law ===
- Beth Bernstein – Democratic state representative, representing the 78th District of South Carolina.
- Michael Kratsios – 13th Director of the Office of Science and Technology Policy
- Joel Lourie – Democratic member of the South Carolina Senate, representing the 22nd District from 2004 to 2017.
