= Richland County School District One =

School district in South Carolina, United States

Location
- United States

District information
- Type: public
- Superintendent: Dr. Todd A. Walker

Richland County School District One (abbreviated RCSD One or "Richland One"), is a school district with its headquarters in the Stevenson Administration Building in Columbia, South Carolina.

Richland One is South Carolina's fifth-largest school district, and serves a population of more than 22,939 students from urban, suburban and rural communities in and around Columbia. Richland One covers 482 square miles (1,250 km^{2}), operates 52 schools and employs 4,229 staff. It serves most of Columbia and Forest Acres, all of Eastover and Hopkins, and slivers of Arcadia Lakes and Blythewood. It is centrally located about 1.5 hours away from the beaches and mountains of South Carolina.

== High schools ==
Richland One operates 7 high schools.

=== Area 1 ===
- Dreher High School (Blue Devils)
- Lower Richland High School (Diamond Hornets)

=== Area 2 ===
- A.C. Flora High School (Falcons)
- C.A. Johnson High School (Green Hornets)
- W. J. Keenan High School (Raiders)

=== Area 3 ===
- Columbia High School (Capitals)
- Eau Claire High School (Shamrocks)

== Middle schools ==
RCSD One operates 9 middle schools.

=== Area 1 ===
- Hand Middle School (Hornets)
- Hopkins Middle School (Eagles)
- Southeast Middle School (Scorpions)

=== Area 2 ===
- Crayton Middle School (Cavaliers)
- W.A. Perry Middle School
- W.G. Sanders Middle School

=== Area 3 ===
- Alcorn Middle School
- Gibbes Middle School (Eagles)
- St. Andrews Middle School

== Elementary schools ==
RCSD One also operates 29 elementary schools.

=== Area 1 ===
- A.C. Moore Elementary School
- Caughman Road Elementary School (Comets)
- Gadsden Elementary School
- Hopkins Elementary School (Hippos)
- Horrell Hill Elementary School
- Meadowfield Elementary School (Mustangs)
- Mill Creek Elementary School
- Rosewood Elementary School
- South Kilbourne Elementary School
- Webber Elementary School

=== Area 2 ===
- Bradley Elementary School
- Brennen Elementary School
- W. Clark Brockman Elementary School
- Burnside Elementary School
- Burton-Pack Elementary School
- Carver-Lyon Elementary School
- Lewis Greenview Elementary School
- Satchel Ford Elementary School; Kevin J Hasinger, Principal
- Watkins-Nance Elementary School

=== Area 3 ===
- Arden Elementary
- E. E. Taylor Elementary
- Forest Heights Elementary
- H.B. Rhame Elementary
- Hyatt Park Elementary
- John P. Thomas Elementary
- Logan Elementary School
- Pine Grove Elementary (Pandas)
- W.S. Sandel Elementary

== Special Schools and Programs in the District ==
- Challenger Learning Center of Richland County School District One
- Heyward Career and Technology Center
- Adult Education
- Evening High School
- Olympia Learning School Alternative
- Pendergrass Fairwold School
- William S. Hall School

=== Charter schools ===
- Richland One Middle College (Grades 11-12)
- Carolina School for Inquiry

== See also ==
- Richland County School District Two
