= Arcadia Lakes, South Carolina =

- Town
- Flag Seal

- Location in Richland County and the state of South Carolina.
- Coordinates: 34°03′13″N 80°57′42″W
- Country: United States
- State: South Carolina
- County: Richland

Area
  - Total: 0.67 sq mi (1.74 km^{2})
  - Land: 0.56 sq mi (1.44 km^{2})
  - Water: 0.11 sq mi (0.29 km^{2})
- Elevation: 220 ft (67 m)

Population (2020)
  - Total: 865
  - Density: 1,552.9/sq mi (599.57/km^{2})
- Time zone: UTC-5 (EST)
  - Summer (DST): UTC-4 (EDT)
- ZIP code: 29206
- Area codes: 803, 839
- FIPS code: 45-02125
- GNIS feature ID: 2405161
- Website: arcadialakes.net

Arcadia Lakes is a town in Richland County, South Carolina, United States. As of the 2020 census, Arcadia Lakes had a population of 865. It is part of the Columbia, South Carolina, Metropolitan Statistical Area.

== Geography ==
According to the United States Census Bureau, the town has a total area of 0.66 square miles (1.7 km^{2}), of which 0.54 square miles (1.4 km^{2}) is land and 0.12 square miles (0.3 km^{2}), or 18.40%, is water.

== Demographics ==
Historical population
Census	Pop.	Note	%±
1960	316		—
1970	741		134.5%
1980	611		−17.5%
1990	899		47.1%
2000	882		−1.9%
2010	861		−2.4%
2020	865		0.5%
U.S. Decennial Census

=== 2020 census ===
Arcadia Lakes town, South Carolina – Racial and ethnic composition Note: the US Census treats Hispanic/Latino as an ethnic category. This table excludes Latinos from the racial categories and assigns them to a separate category. Hispanics/Latinos may be of any race.
Race / Ethnicity (NH = Non-Hispanic)	Pop 2000	Pop 2010	Pop 2020	% 2000	% 2010	% 2020
White alone (NH)	833	769	732	94.44%	89.31%	84.62%
Black or African American alone (NH)	31	41	56	3.51%	4.76%	6.47%
Native American or Alaska Native alone (NH)	0	0	1	0.00%	0.00%	0.12%
Asian alone (NH)	7	28	24	0.79%	3.25%	2.77%
Native Hawaiian or Pacific Islander alone (NH)	0	0	1	0.00%	0.00%	0.12%
Other race alone (NH)	0	2	4	0.00%	0.23%	0.46%
Mixed race or Multiracial (NH)	4	5	25	0.45%	0.58%	2.89%
Hispanic or Latino (any race)	7	16	22	0.79%	1.86%	2.54%
Total	882	861	865	100.00%	100.00%	100.00%

As of the 2020 United States census, there were 865 people, 370 households, and 225 families residing in the town.

=== 2000 census ===
As of the census of 2000, there were 882 people, 379 households, and 278 families residing in the town. The population density was 1,685.6 inhabitants per square mile (650.8/km^{2}). There were 389 housing units at an average density of 743.4 per square mile (287.0/km^{2}). The racial makeup of the town was 94.90% White, 3.63% African American, 0.79% Asian, 0.23% from other races, and 0.45% from two or more races. Hispanic or Latino of any race were 0.79% of the population.

There were 379 households, out of which 24.8% had children under the age of 18 living with them, 66.8% were married couples living together, 4.7% had a female householder with no husband present, and 26.6% were non-families. 22.7% of all households were made up of individuals, and 10.8% had someone living alone who was 65 years of age or older. The average household size was 2.33 and the average family size was 2.72.

In the town, the population was spread out, with 20.2% under the age of 18, 3.1% from 18 to 24, 18.5% from 25 to 44, 34.6% from 45 to 64, and 23.7% who were 65 years of age or older. The median age was 49 years. For every 100 females, there were 97.3 males. For every 100 females age 18 and over, there were 89.2 males.

The median income for a household in the town was $66,382, and the median income for a family was $79,179. Males had a median income of $56,125 versus $35,682 for females. The per capita income for the town was $37,762. About 0.7% of families and 2.9% of the population were below the poverty line, including 2.1% of those under age 18 and none of those age 65 or over.
