= National Register of Historic Places listings in Richland County, South Carolina =

Location of Richland County in South Carolina

This is a list of the National Register of Historic Places listings in Richland County, South Carolina.

This is intended to be a complete list of the properties and districts on the National Register of Historic Places in Richland County, South Carolina, United States. The locations of National Register properties and districts for which the latitude and longitude coordinates are included below, may be seen on a map.

There are 192 properties and districts listed on the National Register in the county, including 5 National Historic Landmarks. Listings in the city of Columbia, including all of the National Historic Landmarks, are listed separately, while the 39 properties and districts in the remaining parts of the county are listed here. Another property in Richland County outside Columbia was once listed but has been removed.

This National Park Service list is complete through NPS recent listings posted September 25, 2026.

== Current listings ==
	Name on the Register	Image	Date listed	Location	City or town	Description
1	Barber House		March 27, 1986 (#86000531)	Off County Road 37; 33°53′39″N 80°52′37″W	Hopkins	
2	Big Lake Cattle Mound		November 25, 1996 (#96001092)	Address Restricted	Hopkins	In Congaree National Park
3	Brady's Cattle Mound		November 25, 1996 (#96001094)	Address Restricted	Hopkins	In Congaree National Park
4	Keziah Goodwyn Hopkins Brevard House		March 27, 1986 (#86000535)	Off U.S. Route 378	Eastover	
5	Bridge Abutments		November 25, 1996 (#96001093)	Address Restricted	Hopkins	In Congaree National Park
6	J.A. Byrd Mercantile Store	J.A. Byrd Mercantile Store	March 27, 1986 (#86000542)	Main St. 33°52′40″N 80°41′40″W	Eastover	
7	Cattle Mound No. 6		November 25, 1996 (#96001095)	Address Restricted	Hopkins	In Congaree National Park
8	Chappell House		March 27, 1986 (#86000589)	Address Restricted	Cedar Creek	
9	Citadel Shirt Corporation		January 15, 2021 (#100006019)	1215 Shop Rd. 33°58′24″N 81°00′40″W	Columbia vicinity	
10	Columbia Country Club		September 28, 2026 (#100013443)	135 Columbia Club Drive West; 34°10′39″N 80°56′05″W	Blythewood vicinity	
11	Cook's Lake Cattle Mound	Cook's Lake Cattle Mound	November 25, 1996 (#96001096)	Address Restricted	Hopkins	In Congaree National Park
12	Cooner's Cattle Mound	Cooner's Cattle Mound	November 25, 1996 (#96001097)	Address Restricted	Hopkins	In Congaree National Park
13	Dead River Cattle Mound		November 25, 1996 (#96001098)	Address Restricted	Hopkins	In Congaree National Park
14	Dead River Dike	Dead River Dike	November 25, 1996 (#96001099)	Address Restricted	Hopkins	In Congaree National Park
15	Farmers and Merchants Bank Building	Farmers and Merchants Bank Building	March 27, 1986 (#86000541)	Main St. 33°52′39″N 80°41′39″W	Eastover	
16	Good Hope Baptist Church	Good Hope Baptist Church	March 27, 1986 (#86000537)	U.S. Route 378 near Sandhill Rd. 33°56′23″N 80°42′41″W	Eastover	
17	Goodwill Plantation		March 27, 1986 (#86000528)	Off U.S. Route 378; 33°57′28″N 80°38′57″W	Eastover	
18	Grovewood		March 27, 1986 (#86000530)	South Carolina Highway 769; 33°54′24″N 80°48′09″W	Congaree	
19	George P. Hoffman House	George P. Hoffman House	March 27, 1986 (#86000586)	North of County Road 54; 34°12′53″N 80°58′19″W	Blythewood	
20	Hopkins Family Cemetery		April 8, 2010 (#09000790)	Address Restricted	Hopkins	
21	Hopkins Graded School		March 27, 1986 (#86000540)	Junction of County Roads 37 and 1412; 33°54′37″N 80°52′28″W	Hopkins	
22	Hopkins Presbyterian Church		March 27, 1986 (#86000538)	Near the junction of County Roads 66 and 86; 33°54′36″N 80°52′26″W	Hopkins	
23	John J. Kaminer House	John J. Kaminer House	March 27, 1986 (#86000532)	Near the junction of South Carolina Highways 48 and 769; 33°50′43″N 80°45′40″W	Gadsden	
24	Kensington Plantation House	Kensington Plantation House	January 25, 1971 (#71000806)	East of Eastover off South Carolina Highway 764; 33°52′12″N 80°39′08″W	Eastover	
25	John Jacob Calhoun Koon Farmstead	John Jacob Calhoun Koon Farmstead	March 27, 1986 (#86000590)	County Road 27 off U.S. Routes 76/176; 34°06′51″N 81°12′24″W	Ballentine	
26	Laurelwood		March 27, 1986 (#86000529)	200 Campbell Rd. 33°56′32″N 80°42′45″W	Eastover, South Carolina	
27	Magnolia		March 27, 1986 (#86000536)	Adams Hayne Rd. 33°54′34″N 80°48′48″W	Gadsden	
28	Northwest Boundary Dike	Northwest Boundary Dike	November 25, 1996 (#96001100)	Address Restricted	Hopkins	
29	Oakwood		March 27, 1986 (#86000544)	South Carolina Highway 48; 33°50′07″N 80°41′19″W	Gadsden	
30	Olympia Armory	Olympia Armory	January 20, 1995 (#94001571)	511 Granby Ln. 33°58′34″N 81°01′40″W	Olympia	
31	Olympia Mill Village Historic District		November 20, 2018 (#100003058)	Portions of Lincoln, Gadsden, Wayne, Heyward, Silver, S Parker, Alabama, Carolina, Delaware, Florida, Georgia, Kentucky, Maryland & Ohio Sts. 33°58′37″N 81°01′56″W	Olympia	
32	Pine Grove Rosenwald School	Pine Grove Rosenwald School	January 9, 2009 (#08001397)	937 Piney Woods Rd. 34°03′47″N 81°07′28″W	St. Andrews	
33	Richland Presbyterian Church	Richland Presbyterian Church	March 27, 1986 (#86000533)	County Road 1313; 33°50′38″N 80°42′03″W	Gadsden	
34	St. Phillip School		April 19, 1996 (#96000383)	4350 McCords Ferry Rd. 33°50′56″N 80°39′07″W	Eastover	
35	Saint Thomas' Protestant Episcopal Church		March 27, 1986 (#86000539)	Near the junction of U.S. Route 601 and South Carolina Highway 263; 33°54′12″N 80°40′38″W	Eastover	
36	Claudius Scott Cottage	Claudius Scott Cottage	March 27, 1986 (#86000534)	County Road 1182; 33°55′01″N 80°42′07″W	Eastover	
37	Siloam School		April 15, 1996 (#96000382)	1331 Congaree Rd. 33°56′15″N 80°49′33″W	Eastover	
38	Southwest Boundary Dike		November 25, 1996 (#96001101)	Address Restricted	Hopkins	In Congaree National Park
39	Woodlands		February 1, 2006 (#05001572)	409 Old Woodlands Rd. 33°58′30″N 80°58′10″W	Columbia	Folk Victorian two-story farm house built in 1896.

== Former listings ==
	Name on the Register	Image	Date listed	Date removed	Location	City or town	Description
1	Zion Protestant Episcopal Church		March 27, 1986 (#86000543)	March 13, 2000	Highway 263	Eastover	Destroyed by fire on April 17, 1992.

== See also ==
- List of National Historic Landmarks in South Carolina
- National Register of Historic Places listings in South Carolina
