= List of bridges on the National Register of Historic Places in South Carolina =

This is a list of bridges and tunnels on the National Register of Historic Places in the U.S. state of South Carolina.

Name	Image	Built	Listed	Location	County	Type
Bridge Abutments		1780s	1996-11-25	Hopkins	Richland	
Campbell's Covered Bridge	Campbell's Covered Bridge	1909	2009-7-1	Gowensville; 35°5′9″N 82°15′51″W	Greenville	Howe truss covered bridge
Gervais Street Bridge	1986 HAER photo	1926, 1928	1980-11-25	Columbia, West Columbia; 33°59′42″N 81°3′11″W	Lexington, Richland	Reinforced Concrete Bridge
Lady's Island Bridge		1959	2023-01-06	Beaufort; 32°25′39.0″N 80°40′09.0″W	Beaufort	Swing
Poinsett Bridge	1986 HAER photo	1820	1970-10-22	Tigerville; 35°7′47″N 82°23′6″W	Greenville	1820 stone bridge
John Seabrook Plantation Bridge		ca. 1782	1974-10-09	Rockville; 32°37′38″N 80°12′37″W	Charleston	
Stumphouse Tunnel Complex	Looking out of Stumphouse Tunnel	1852, 1859	1971-04-07	Walhalla	Oconee	
Waccamaw River Memorial Bridge	Waccamaw River Memorial Bridge	1937	1994-08-26	Conway; 33°49′59″N 79°2′39″W	Horry	Continuous steel girder
Bradley's Covered Bridge		1892	removed 1979-01-01	Troy	McCormick	Howe truss Also called Long Cane covered bridge
Prather's Bridge	Bridge piers in the foreground are from the covered bridge that burned	ca. 1861	removed 1978-05-04	Westminster	Oconee	Town truss Covered Bridge
