= Chappell House =

Chappell House may refer to:

- Delos Allen Chappell House, Denver, Colorado, listed on the NRHP in Colorado
- Philip E. Chappell House, Kansas City, Missouri, listed on the NRHP in Missouri
- Chappell Farmhouse, Cazenovia, New York, listed on the NRHP in New York
- Purefoy-Chappell House and Outbuildings, Wake Forest, North Carolina, listed on the NRHP in North Carolina
- Chappell-Swedenburg House, Ashland, Oregon, listed on the NRHP in Oregon
- Chappell House (Cedar Creek, South Carolina), listed on the NRHP in South Carolina
