= Siloam School =

Siloam School may refer to:

- Siloam Junior High School, Siloam, Georgia, listed on the National Register of Historic Places in Greene County, Georgia
- Siloam School (Charlotte, North Carolina), listed on the National Register of Historic Places in Mecklenburg County, North Carolina
- Siloam School (Eastover, South Carolina), listed on the National Register of Historic Places in Richland County, South Carolina
