= Harry Hampton (disambiguation) =

Harry Hampton was a recipient of the Victoria Cross.

Harry Hampton may also refer to:

- Harry Hampton (footballer, born 1885) (1885–1963), English international footballer
- Harry Hampton (footballer, born 1888) (1888–1946), Irish international footballer
- Harry Hampton (cricketer), English cricketer
- Harry Hampton (golfer) (1889–1965), Scottish-American professional golfer
- Harry R. E. Hampton (1897–1980), American journalist and conservationist
