= Laurelwood (Richland County, South Carolina) =

Historic house in South Carolina, United States

- U.S. National Register of Historic Places
- Location within South Carolina Location within the United States
- Location: 200 Campbell Rd., Eastover, South Carolina
- Nearest city: Columbia, South Carolina
- Coordinates: 33°56′32″N 80°42′45″W
- Area: 1.4 acres (0.57 ha)
- Built: c. 1830
- Architectural style: Greek Revival
- MPS: Lower Richland County MRA
- NRHP reference No.: 86000529
- Added to NRHP: March 27, 1986

Laurelwood is a historic plantation house located in rural Richland County, South Carolina, near the city of Eastover. It was built about 1830, and is a two-story frame dwelling with a central-hall, double-pile plan. The front façade features a two-tier, three bay, pedimented portico in the Greek Revival style. It has a one-story, frame addition built in the early-20th century. Also on the property are the contributing frame smokehouse and a frame barn. Also notable is the survival of a slave quarters.

It was added to the National Register of Historic Places in 1986.

== See also ==
- National Register of Historic Places listings in Richland County, South Carolina
