= Cooner's Cattle Mound =

- U.S. National Register of Historic Places
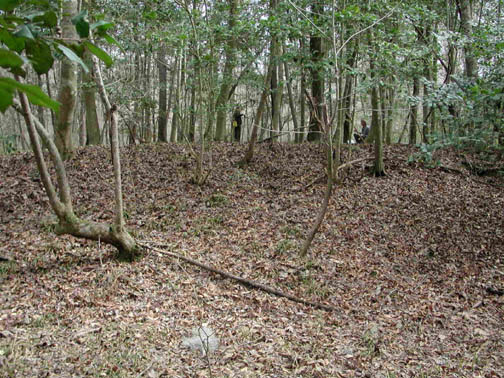

- Location within South Carolina Location within the United States
- Nearest city: Hopkins, South Carolina
- Area: less than one acre
- MPS: Congaree Swamp National Monument MPS
- NRHP reference No.: 96001097
- Added to NRHP: November 25, 1996

Cooner's Cattle Mound is a historic earthen cattle mound located in Congaree National Park near Hopkins, Richland County, South Carolina, United States. It was built by settlers in the Congaree Swamp to provide a place of refuge for hogs, cattle, and other grazing animals during the flood season. Cooner's Cattle Mound is an oval mound measuring approximately 300 feet in diameter, with a 5 to 10 foot tall flat top.

It was added to the National Register of Historic Places in 1996.
