= Northwest Boundary Dike =

- U.S. National Register of Historic Places
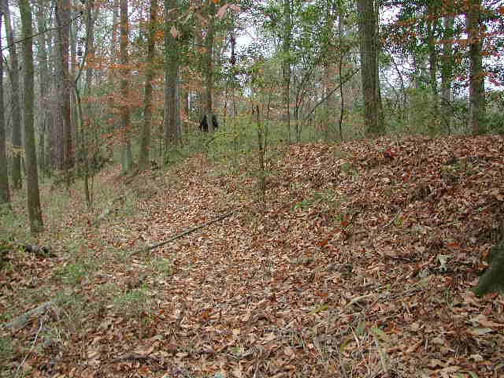
- Nearest city: Hopkins, South Carolina
- Area: 1.5 acres (0.61 ha)
- Built: 1840
- MPS: Congaree Swamp National Monument MPS
- NRHP reference No.: 96001100
- Added to NRHP: November 25, 1996

Northwest Boundary Dike is a historic earthen dike located near Hopkins, Richland County, South Carolina. It was built about 1840 by settlers in the Congaree Swamp to control the periodic flooding of the Congaree River and utilize the fertile swampland. The Northwest Boundary Dike measures approximately 10-to-30-foot-wide-by-5-foot-high, and runs for approximately 2000 feet.

It was added to the National Register of Historic Places in 1996.
