= Brady's Cattle Mound =

- U.S. National Register of Historic Places
- Location within South Carolina Location within the United States
- Nearest city: Hopkins, South Carolina
- Area: less than one acre
- Built: c. 1900
- MPS: Congaree Swamp National Monument MPS
- NRHP reference No.: 96001094
- Added to NRHP: November 25, 1996

Brady's Cattle Mound is a historic earthen cattle mound located in Congaree National Park near Hopkins, Richland County, South Carolina. It was built about 1900 by settlers in the Congaree Swamp to provide a place of refuge for hogs, cattle, and other grazing animals during the flood season. Brady's Cattle Mount is an oval mound measuring approximately 300 feet in diameter, with a 6 to 7 foot tall flat top. It remains in use.

It was added to the National Register of Historic Places in 1996.
