= Southwest Boundary Dike =

- U.S. National Register of Historic Places
- Nearest city: Hopkins, South Carolina
- MPS: Congaree Swamp National Monument MPS
- NRHP reference No.: 96001101
- Added to NRHP: November 25, 1996

Southwest Boundary Dike is a historic earthen dike located in Congaree National Park near Hopkins, Richland County, South Carolina. It was built by settlers in the Congaree Swamp to control the periodic flooding of the Congaree River and utilize the fertile swampland. The Southwest Boundary Dike measures approximately 3-to-4-foot high, and runs for approximately 650 feet, interrupted by a gut of water, and then continues for approximately 1,300 to 1,400 feet.

It was added to the National Register of Historic Places in 1996.
