= Annie B. Martin =

American labor and civil rights activist (1920–2012)

- Born: December 20, 1920; Eastover, South Carolina, U.S.
- Died: June 12, 2012 (aged 91); Harlem, New York City, U.S.
- Education: Allen University; New York University
- Occupations: First Vice-President for the Black Trade Unionists Leadership Committee; State Assistant Commissioner of New York; Adjunct Professor; Director of Labor Participation for the American Red Cross
- Parent(s): Jacob and Queenie Martin
- Awards: Ellis Island Medal of Honor

Annie B. Martin (December 20, 1920 – June 12, 2012) was an American pioneer of the labor movement and the civil rights movement. A South Carolina native, Martin participated in many marches in Washington, D.C., was appointed New York state assistant commissioner of labor under three governors, served sixteen terms as president of the New York City branch of the National Association for the Advancement of Colored People, and sat on that association's national board of directors for nineteen years.

== Early life ==
Born in Eastover, South Carolina, to Jacob and Queenie Martin, Annie B. Martin was the seventh of eight children. When Martin was a small child, she was introduced by her father to labor activist A. Philip Randolph. Martin graduated Allen University in Columbia, South Carolina, became a chemist for Squibb, and was elected secretary-treasurer of Local 8-138 Oil, Chemical and Atomic Workers International Union. While at Squibb, Martin attended the funeral of Martin Luther King Jr. on behalf of her company. Martin earned master's degrees in guidance counseling and social work from New York University, and would eventually be awarded an honorary doctor of humane letters from Claflin University in Orangeburg, South Carolina.

== Labor and civil rights career ==
"She's been on the front lines against the closing of schools and the warehousing of children. She has always been there, and stands on the side of right no matter what or who is standing on the other side."

— UFT President Michael Mulgrew

Martin participated in the 1963 March on Washington for Jobs and Freedom alongside her lifelong friend and march organizer A. Philip Randolph. Martin and Randolph marched again in 1968 to support due process for the United Federation of Teachers, a union which had shut down public schools during the New York City teachers' strike of 1968.

A recipient of the Ellis Island Medal of Honor, Martin served as President of the NAACP New York City Branch for an unprecedented sixteen terms, and was a former First Vice-President for the Black Trade Unionists Leadership Committee. Martin served as State Assistant Commissioner under the New York governorships of Rockefeller, Wilson, and Carey, and was one of the first women to hold high office within the labor movement. Martin also served as an adjunct professor for Fordham, Columbia and New York Universities.

Among her achievements, Martin was a New YWCA Academy of Women Achievers inductee, a member of the New York City Coalition of Labor Union Women, commissioner on the Commission on the Dignity of Immigrants, and Director of Labor Participation for the American Red Cross in Greater New York. During the days following the September 11 attacks, an 81-year-old Martin served "as liaison between labor, the Red Cross and the NYFD and NYPD departments. This remarkable woman coordinated survival and job-placement issues for hundreds of members of organized labor and personally processed 290 claims for American Red Cross Emergency Family Gifts to families' beneficiaries who lost members at 'Ground Zero.'

== Death ==
Martin died in Harlem, New York City, on June 12, 2012, at the age of 91. The memorial service was held at Greater Bethel AME Church in Harlem, where she had been a member for many years. After Martin's death, a resolution was adopted by the New York State Senate paying tribute to her life and career. U.S. Representative Charles B. Rangel extended his remarks to the House on June 19, 2012, to celebrate the life and mourn the loss of Dr. Martin. In his remarks, Rangel stated: "Affectionately known to many of us as Chief or simply Annie B, Dr. Martin was a devoted and dedicated member of the NAACP National Board of Directors. With her soft, but outspoken voice she led by example and with dignity."
