= Cattle Mound No. 6 =

- Cattle Mound #6
- U.S. National Register of Historic Places
- Nearest city: Hopkins, South Carolina
- Area: less than one acre
- MPS: Congaree Swamp National Monument MPS
- NRHP reference No.: 96001095
- Added to NRHP: November 25, 1996

Cattle Mound No. 6, also known as Georgia Pacific Cattle Mound, is a historic earthen cattle mound located in Congaree National Park near Hopkins, Richland County, South Carolina. It was built by settlers in the Congaree Swamp to provide a place of refuge for hogs, cattle, and other grazing animals during the flood season. Cattle Mound No. 6 is an oval mound measuring approximately 400 feet in diameter, with an 8 to 10 foot tall flat top.

It was added to the National Register of Historic Places in 1996.
