= Dead River Dike =

- U.S. National Register of Historic Places
- Nearest city: Hopkins, South Carolina
- Area: 37 acres (15 ha)
- MPS: Congaree Swamp National Monument MPS
- NRHP reference No.: 96001099
- Added to NRHP: November 25, 1996

Dead River Dike is a historic earthen dike located in Congaree National Park near Hopkins, Richland County, South Carolina. It was built by settlers in the Congaree Swamp to control the periodic flooding of the Congaree River and utilize the fertile swampland. The Dead River Dike is an L-shaped earthen structure measuring 4-to-5-foot high, with one leg approximately 2000 feet long and the second approximately 800 feet long.

It was added to the National Register of Historic Places in 1996.
