= Bridge Abutments =

- U.S. National Register of Historic Places
- Nearest city: Hopkins, South Carolina
- Area: 0 acres (0 ha)
- MPS: Congaree Swamp National Monument MPS
- NRHP reference No.: 96001093
- Added to NRHP: November 25, 1996

Bridge Abutments are four pair of historic earthen bridge abutments located in Congaree National Park near Hopkins, Richland County, South Carolina. They were built by settlers (possibly Isaac Huger) in the 1780s in the Congaree Swamp to provide a means of transporting produce and livestock to markets in cities, such as Charleston. They vary in size from 5-to-10-feet high and 10-to-15-feet wide.

It was added to the National Register of Historic Places in 1996.
