= Hopkins Family Cemetery =

Historic site in Richland County, South Carolina, US

- U.S. National Register of Historic Places
- Location within South Carolina Location within the United States
- Nearest city: Hopkins, South Carolina
- Area: 4.5 acres (1.8 ha)
- Built: c. 1775, c. 1835–1837
- NRHP reference No.: 09000790
- Added to NRHP: April 8, 2010

Hopkins Family Cemetery is a historic family cemetery located near Hopkins, Richland County, South Carolina. It was established about 1775, on the Back Swamp Plantation. A wall and stile were built about 1835–1837. It contains 69 marked graves of the Hopkins and related families.

It was added to the National Register of Historic Places in 2010.
