= Hopkins Graded School =

- U.S. National Register of Historic Places
- Location within South Carolina Location within the United States
- Location: Jct. of CR 37 and CR 1412, Hopkins, South Carolina
- Coordinates: 33°54′37″N 80°52′28″W
- Area: 1 acre (0.40 ha)
- Built: 1897
- MPS: Lower Richland County MRA
- NRHP reference No.: 86000540
- Added to NRHP: March 27, 1986

Hopkins Graded School, also known as Old Hopkins School, is a historic school building located at Hopkins, Richland County, South Carolina. It was built about 1897, as a one-teacher school. It is a rambling, one-story, L-shaped, frame building with weatherboard siding and a gable roof. It features a small square belfry with a pyramidal roof. A new school was constructed across the street about 1914, and the old school was subsequently used as a teacherage.

It was added to the National Register of Historic Places in 1986.
