= Hopkins Presbyterian Church =

Historic church in South Carolina, United States

- U.S. National Register of Historic Places
- Location within South Carolina Location within the United States
- Location: Near jct. of CR 66 and CR 86, Hopkins, South Carolina
- Coordinates: 33°54′36″N 80°52′26″W
- Area: 0.6 acres (0.24 ha)
- Built: 1891
- MPS: Lower Richland County MRA
- NRHP reference No.: 86000538
- Added to NRHP: March 27, 1986

Hopkins Presbyterian Church, also known as Hopkins Methodist Church, is a historic church building located near the junction of CR 66 and CR 86 in Hopkins, Richland County, South Carolina. It was built about 1891, and is a small, one-story frame building. It was built by a Methodist congregation, and purchased by a Presbyterian congregation in 1919.

It was added to the National Register of Historic Places in 1986.
