= Gervais Street Bridge =

Historic bridge in South Carolina, United States

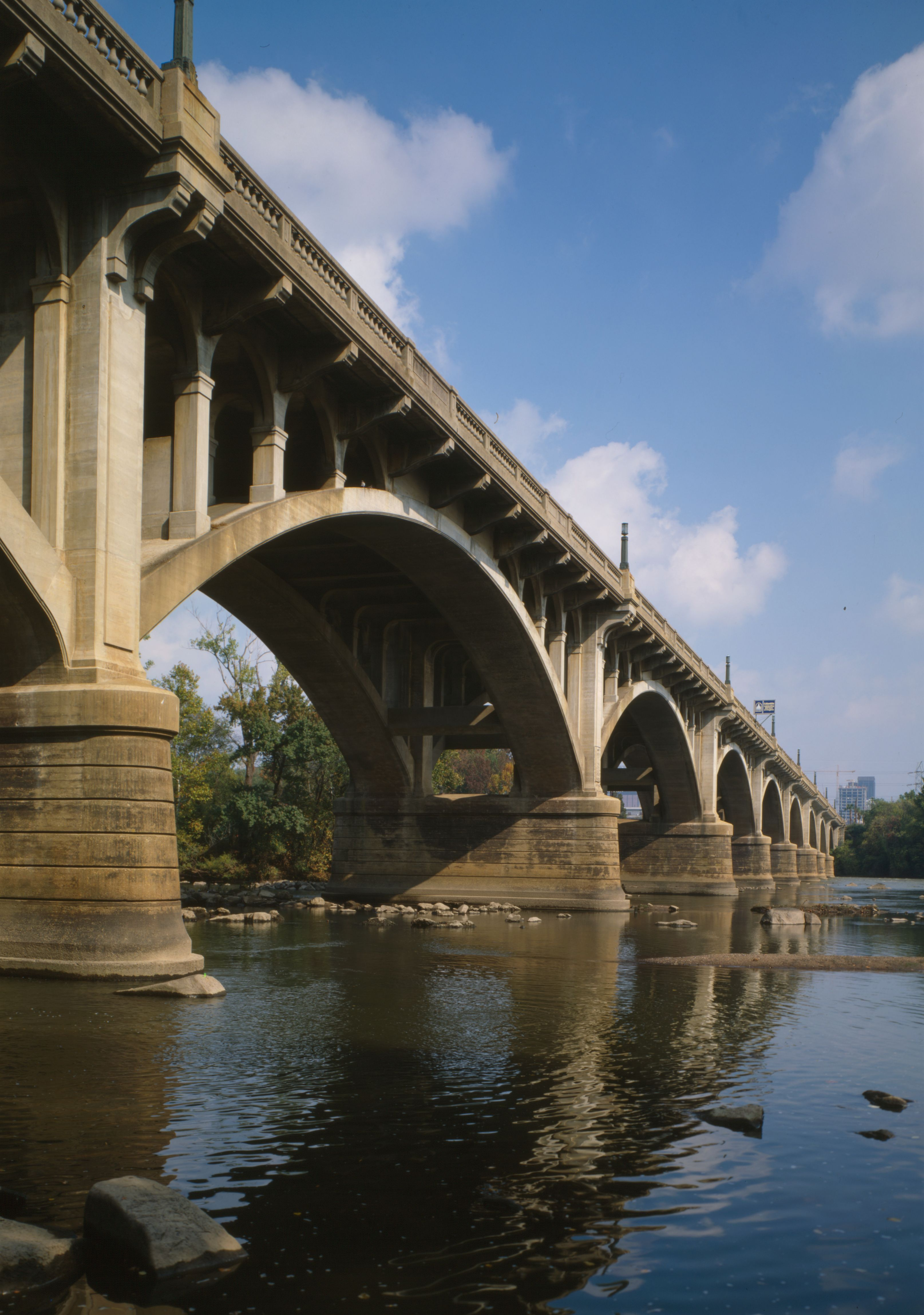
- Photograph of the Gervais Street Bridge in 1986
- Coordinates: 33°59′42″N 81°03′11″W
- Carries: 4 lanes of US 1 / US 378
- Crosses: Congaree River
- Locale: Columbia, South Carolina
- ID number: 000000000000258

Characteristics
- Design: Arch Bridge
- Material: Reinforced concrete
- Total length: 1,415 feet (431 m)
- Width: 36.1 feet (11.0 m)
- No. of spans: 11

History
- Architect: Charles C. Randolph
- Designer: Joseph W. Barnwell
- Constructed by: Hardaway Contracting Company
- Construction start: June 1926
- Construction end: February 1928
- Construction cost: $597,167 adjusted for inflation (2025) approximately $11,118,837
- Opened: 1927

Statistics
- Daily traffic: 26600
- Gervais Street Bridge
- U.S. National Register of Historic Places
- Location within South Carolina
- Coordinates: 33°59′42″N 81°3′11″W
- MPS: Historic Resources of Columbia
- NRHP reference No.: 80003676
- Added to NRHP: 25 November 1980

Gervais Street Bridge is a historic bridge in South Carolina in the United States and it is listed on the National Register of Historic Places. It is an arch bridge constructed from reinforced concrete. Construction began in 1926 and the bridge was completed in 1928. It was added to the National Register of Historic Places in 1980.

This is the third bridge to be built on this site across the Congaree River. The first, built around 1827, was burned down in the American Civil War and the second, built in 1870, was replaced by the current bridge. At the time of its construction it was the widest roadway in the state. It was the only bridge across the Congaree River until 1953.

== Architecture ==
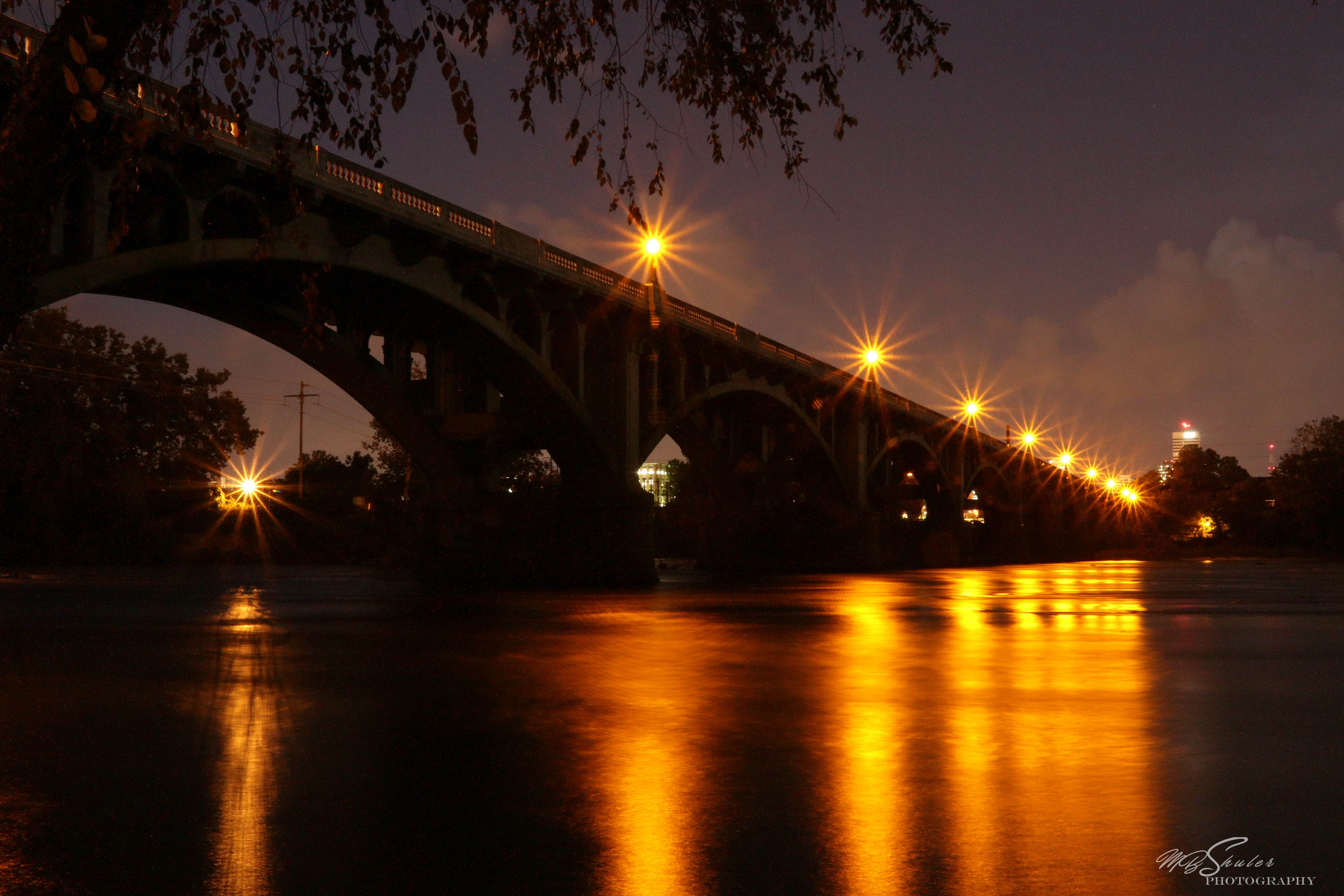
Gervais Street Bridge at Night

The bridge is an arch bridge constructed from reinforced concrete with open spandrels. The bridge is crossed by a roadway flanked by sidewalks. The balustrades along the edges of the bridge carry green-painted, cast iron light fixtures at intervals. The decorative fixtures of these lamp posts have the letter C and a palmetto palms on the bases, a vine pattern on the eight-sided post, and an acanthus leaf design on the necking. It is one of four open spandrel concrete bridges in South Carolina as well as the oldest and most decorative of the three bridges that cross the Congaree River.

== Geography ==
The Gervais Street Bridge is located in Columbia, South Carolina. It carries U.S. Route 1 (US 1) and US 378 across the Congaree River. Within the city, the bridge links Gervais Street on the east bank to Meeting Street on the west bank. The bridge connects Columbia with the south and west parts of South Carolina. This bridge is close to the site where the Broad River and the Saluda River meet to form the Congaree River.

== History ==
This is the third bridge built on this site. The remains of both previous bridges can be seen north of the current Gervais Street Bridge.

The first was a wooden bridge. The Columbia Bridge Company was charted in 1819 to construct the bridge and it was completed in about 1827. The early planners of Columbia intended Senate Street and Assembly Street to be the two main thoroughfares of the city. However, for engineering reasons, the bridge across the Congaree River was constructed at the foot of Gervais Street, which caused the traffic to bypass Senate Street. The latter became a residential area instead while Gervais Street acquired more activity and commerce; which was further enhanced with the arrival of major railroads.

The Confederate States Army burned the first bridge in 1865 to delay the progress of General Sherman's army during the American Civil War. The second bridge was constructed in 1870. It was privately owned until 1912, when it was purchased by Richland County in cooperation with Lexington County.

The building of the current bridge began in February 1926 and the bridge was completed in June 1928. It was designed by the bridge engineer for the State Highway Department, Joseph W. Barnwell of Charleston, and constructed by the Hardaway Contracting Company of Columbus, Georgia. Until 1953, Gervais Street Bridge was the only bridge across the Congaree River. At the time of its construction it was the widest roadway in the state.

Gervais Street Bridge was nominated for the National Register of Historic Places as part of the Historic Resources of Columbia multiple property submission. It was listed on 25 November 1980.

== See also ==
- List of bridges documented by the Historic American Engineering Record in South Carolina
- List of bridges on the National Register of Historic Places in South Carolina
- National Register of Historic Places listings in Columbia, South Carolina
- National Register of Historic Places listings in Lexington County, South Carolina
