= Barber House (Hopkins, South Carolina) =

Historic house in South Carolina, United States

- U.S. National Register of Historic Places
- Location within South Carolina Location within the United States
- Nearest city: Hopkins, South Carolina
- Coordinates: 33°53′39″N 80°52′37″W
- Built: 1880
- MPS: Lower Richland County MRA
- NRHP reference No.: 86000531
- Added to NRHP: March 27, 1986

The Harriet Barber House is a historic house located in Hopkins, South Carolina. It was built in 1880 and is significant for its architecture. It was added to the National Register of Historic Places in 1986.

In 2023, descendants of the Barber family who led the effort to preserve the site received a South Carolina preservation award from Governor Henry McMaster.
