= Keziah Goodwyn Hopkins Brevard House =

Historic house in South Carolina, United States

- U.S. National Register of Historic Places
- Location: Address Restricted
- Nearest city: Eastover, South Carolina
- Area: 4 acres (1.6 ha)
- Built: c. 1820, c. 1850
- Architectural style: Italianate, Greek Revival
- MPS: Lower Richland County MRA
- NRHP reference No.: 86000535
- Added to NRHP: March 27, 1986

Keziah Goodwyn Hopkins Brevard House, also known as Alwehav ("All We Have"), is a historic plantation house located in rural Richland County, South Carolina, near Eastover. The original house was built about 1820, and enlarged to its present size about 1850. It is a large, two-story, vernacular Greek Revival style residence with Italianate features. Also on the property are the remnants of a water tower (c. 1908), a frame stable, a barn, three frame sheds, a well, and four modern shed buildings. The property also has a number of unique horticultural specimens.

It was added to the National Register of Historic Places in 1986. Keziah Brevard was a widowed plantation mistress.
