= Waccamaw River Memorial Bridge =

- U.S. National Register of Historic Places
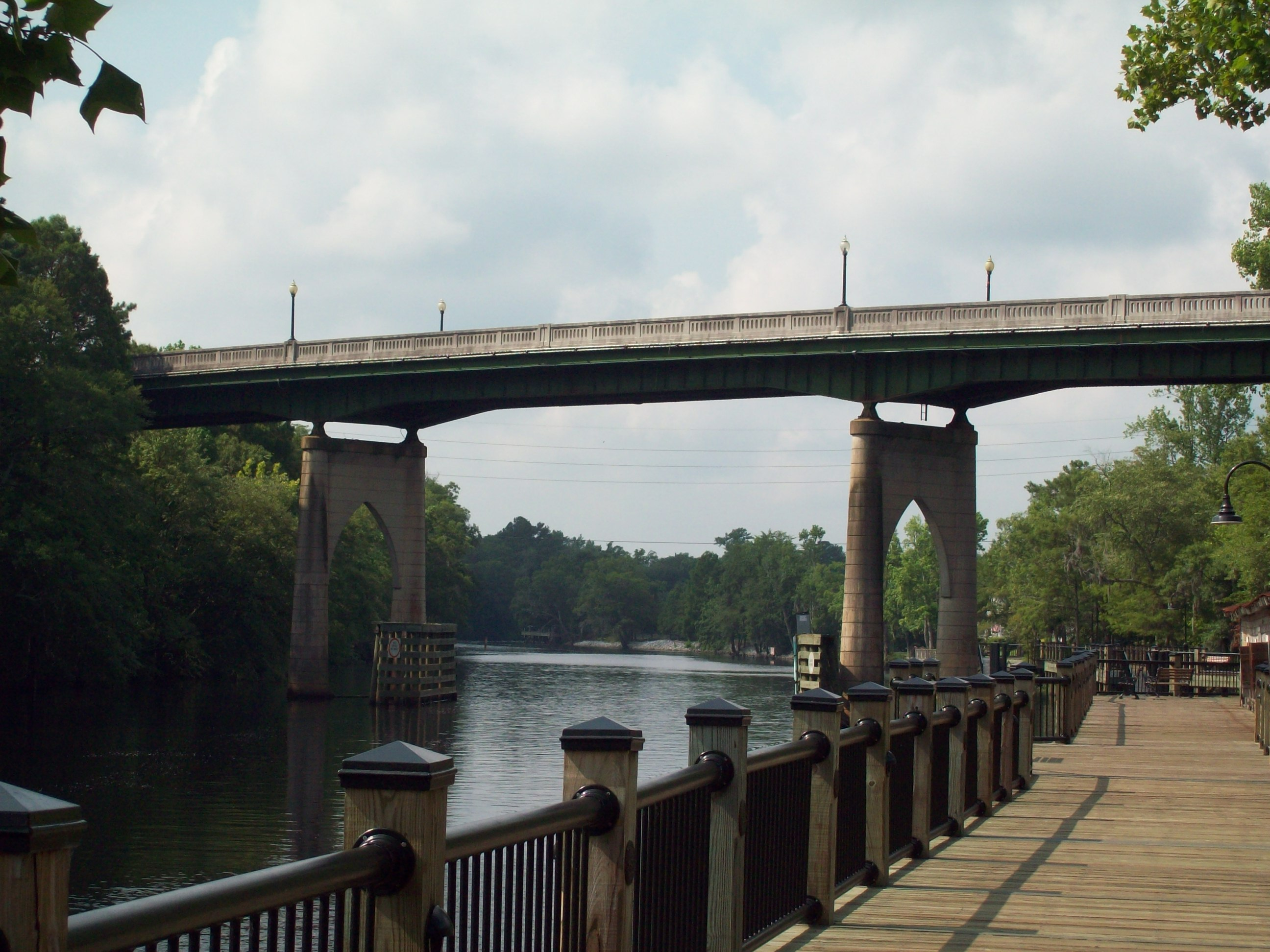
- Waccamaw River Memorial Bridge, June 2010

- Location within South Carolina Location within the United States
- Location: US 501 Bus. (Main Street) over the Waccamaw R., Conway, South Carolina
- Coordinates: 33°49′59″N 79°2′39″W
- Area: 2 acres (0.81 ha)
- Built: 1937
- Architect: Gooding, W. J.; Tidewater Construction Company
- Architectural style: Continuous steel girder
- MPS: Conway MRA
- NRHP reference No.: 94000994
- Added to NRHP: August 26, 1994

Waccamaw River Memorial Bridge is a historic bridge located at Conway in Horry County, South Carolina.

It was built in 1937 and opened to the public in April 1938, designated as a memorial to Horry County citizens who served in America's wars from the American Revolution through the First World War. Its cost was $370,000. It is 1,270 feet long and carries U.S. Route 501 Business over the Waccamaw River. It is a multi-span continuous steel girder bridge made up of four steel girder main spans, four continuous steel string approach spans, and concrete piers which support the bridge deck. It features 28 cast-iron light standards along the balustrade, and the Gothic-influenced pointed arches cut out of its concrete piers.

It was listed on the National Register of Historic Places in 1994.

== Gallery ==
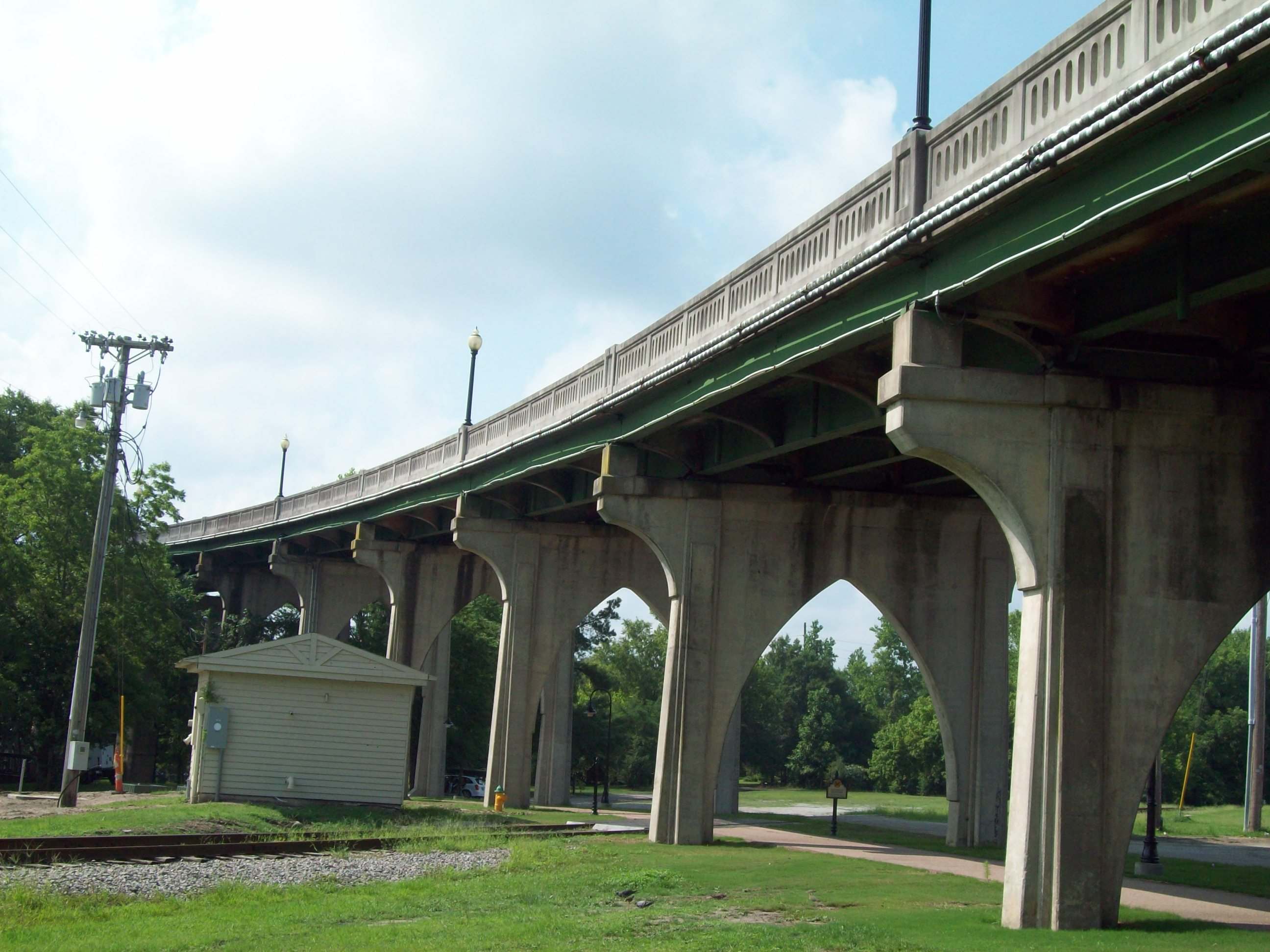
Waccamaw River Memorial Bridge, June 2010

== See also ==
- List of bridges on the National Register of Historic Places in South Carolina
- National Register of Historic Places listings in Horry County, South Carolina
