= Olympia, South Carolina =

- Census-designated place
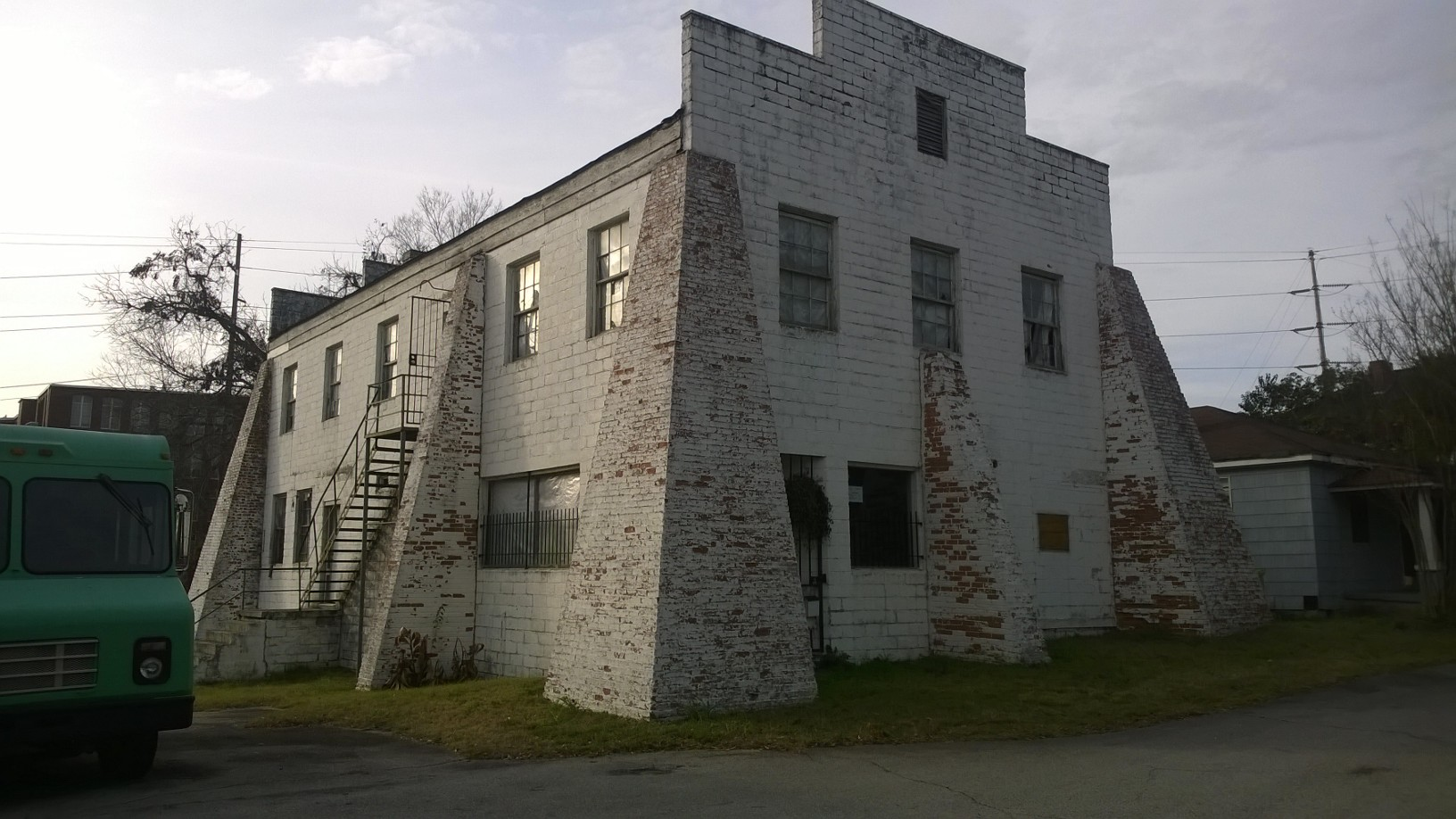
- Olympia Union Hall

- Location within South Carolina Location within the United States
- Coordinates: 33°58′36″N 81°02′06″W
- Country: United States
- State: South Carolina
- County: Richland

Area
  - Total: 0.76 sq mi (1.96 km^{2})
  - Land: 0.71 sq mi (1.85 km^{2})
  - Water: 0.039 sq mi (0.10 km^{2})
- Elevation: 180 ft (55 m)

Population (2020)
  - Total: 1,087
  - Density: 1,519/sq mi (586.4/km^{2})
- Time zone: UTC-5 (Eastern (EST))
  - Summer (DST): UTC-4 (EDT)
- ZIP Code: 29201 (Columbia)
- Area codes: 803/839
- FIPS code: 45-52900
- GNIS feature ID: 2812988

Olympia is an urban unincorporated area and census-designated place (CDP) in Richland County, South Carolina, United States. It was first listed as a CDP prior to the 2020 census with a population of 1,087.

The CDP is in western Richland County, bordered to the north by the city of Columbia, the state capital, and to the west, across the Congaree River, by the city of Cayce. The eastern half of the CDP is residential, while the western half is occupied by the Columbia Quarry of Vulcan Materials.

Four locations in the CDP are listed on the National Register of Historic Places. The Olympia Armory is on Granby Lane in the northeast part of the CDP, the Olympia Mill School is on Olympia Avenue in the northern part of the CDP, and the Olympia Union Hall is on Silver Street in the northernmost part of the CDP, close to the Columbia city line. Much of the northeast part of the CDP is within the Olympia Mill Village Historic District.

The Olympia Mill is within the Columbia city limits, just north of the CDP.

== Demographics ==
Historical population
Census	Pop.	Note	%±
2020	1,087		—
U.S. Decennial Census; 2020

Olympia first appeared as a census designated place in the 2020 U.S. census.

=== 2020 census ===
Olympia CDP, South Carolina – Racial and ethnic composition Note: the US Census treats Hispanic/Latino as an ethnic category. This table excludes Latinos from the racial categories and assigns them to a separate category. Hispanics/Latinos may be of any race.
Race / Ethnicity (NH = Non-Hispanic)	Pop 2020	% 2020
White alone (NH)	846	77.83%
Black or African American alone (NH)	103	9.48%
Native American or Alaska Native alone (NH)	7	0.64%
Asian alone (NH)	6	0.55%
Native Hawaiian or Pacific Islander alone (NH)	0	0.00%
Other race alone (NH)	5	0.46%
Mixed race or Multiracial (NH)	46	4.23%
Hispanic or Latino (any race)	74	6.81%
Total	1,087	100.00%
