= Claudius Scott Cottage =

Historic house in South Carolina, United States

- U.S. National Register of Historic Places
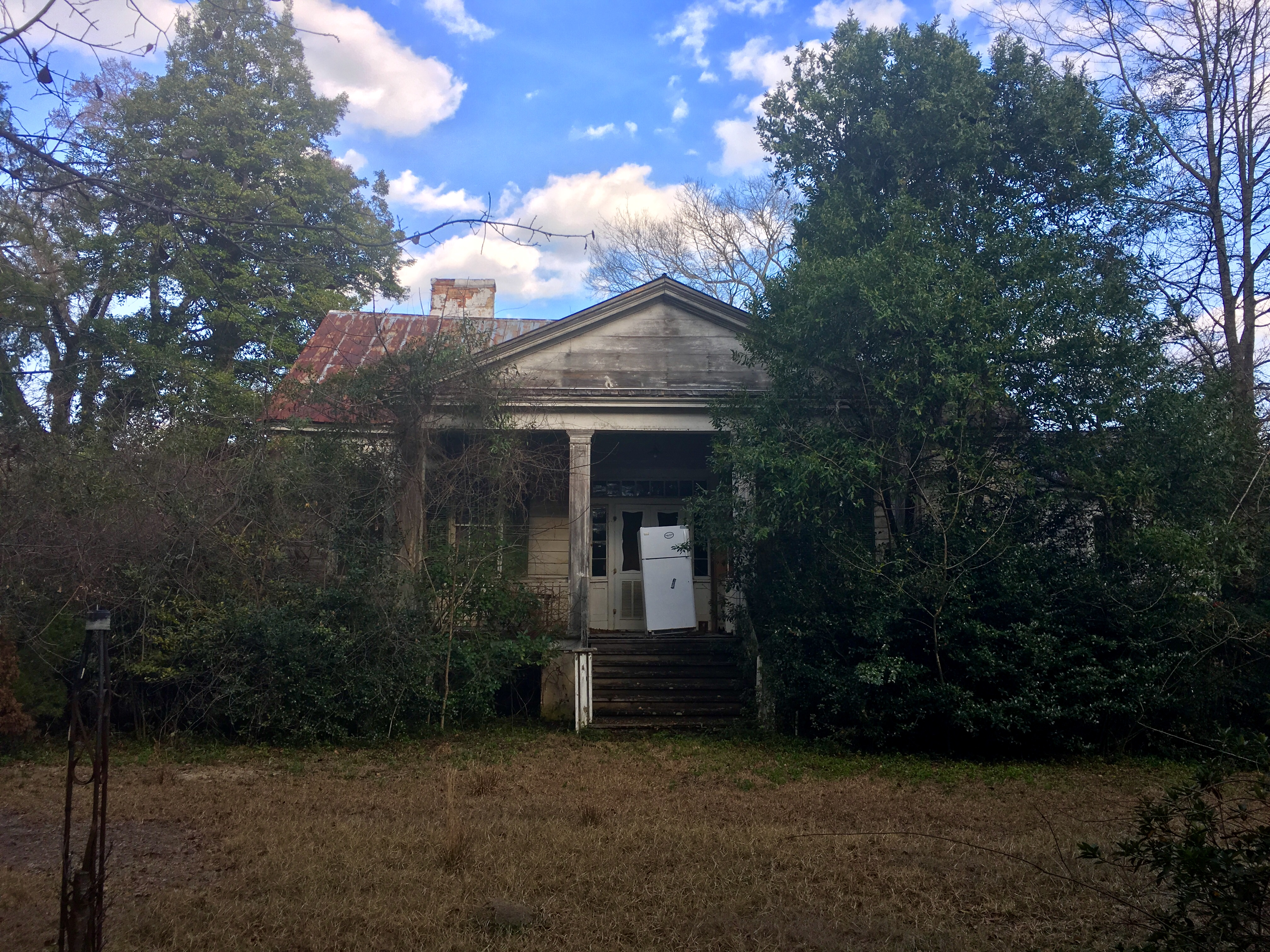

- Location within South Carolina Location within the United States
- Location: near Eastover, South Carolina
- Coordinates: 33°55′1″N 80°42′7″W
- Area: 3.8 acres (1.5 ha)
- Built: c. 1840
- Architectural style: Greek Revival
- MPS: Lower Richland County MRA
- NRHP reference No.: 86000534
- Added to NRHP: March 27, 1986

Claudius Scott Cottage is a historic home located near Eastover, Richland County, South Carolina. It was built about 1840, and is a one-story, frame Greek Revival residence. The front façade features a small pedimented porch with four wooden pillars. It was originally built as a summer residence.

It was added to the National Register of Historic Places in 1986.
