= J.A. Byrd Mercantile Store =

- U.S. National Register of Historic Places
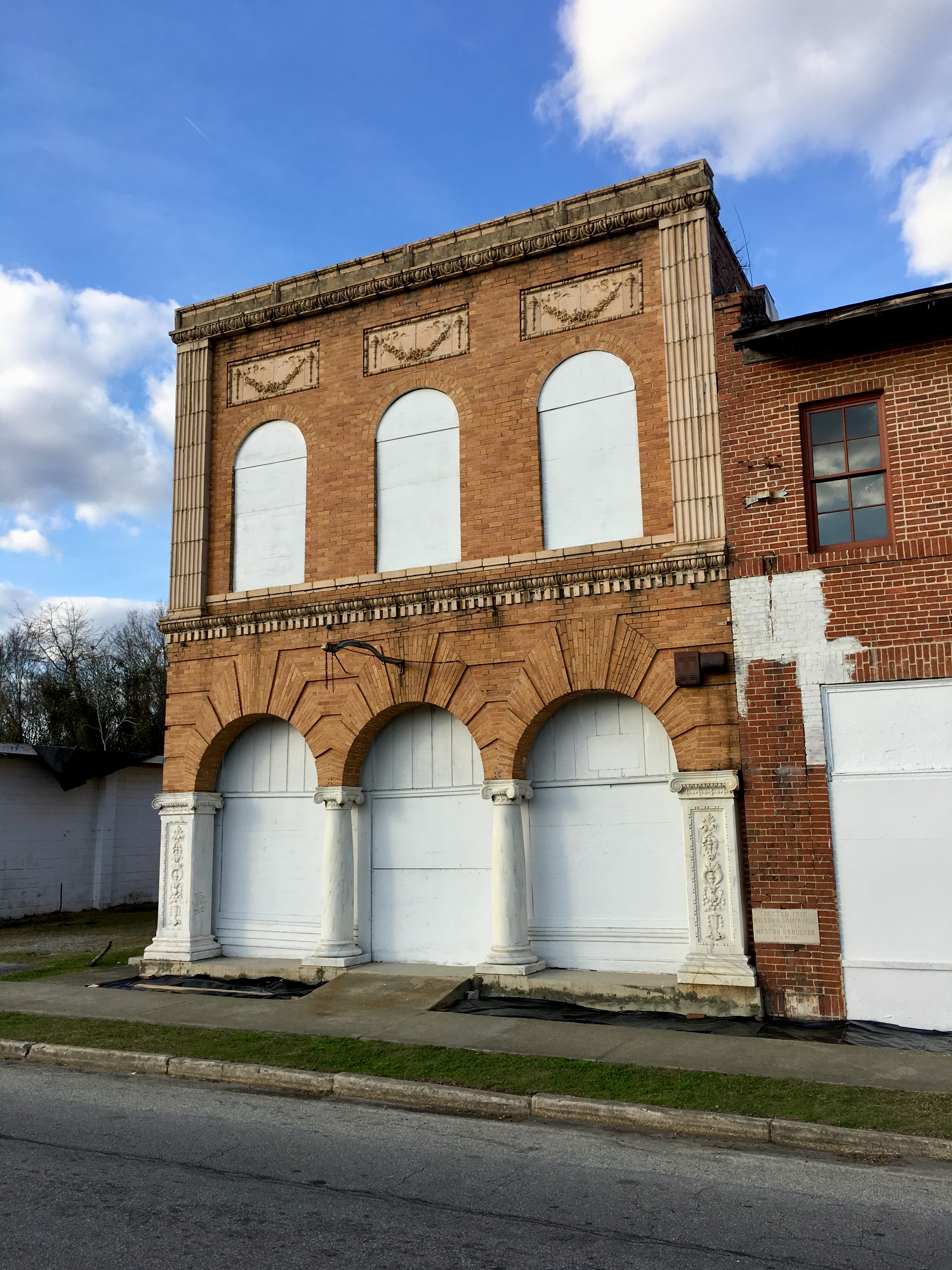

- Location within South Carolina Location within the United States
- Location: Main St., Eastover, South Carolina
- Coordinates: 33°52′40″N 80°41′40″W
- Area: 0.2 acres (0.081 ha)
- Built: c. 1910
- MPS: Lower Richland County MRA
- NRHP reference No.: 86000542
- Added to NRHP: March 27, 1986

J.A. Byrd Mercantile Store, also known as Nelson-Frazier Furniture, is a historic commercial building located at Eastover, Richland County, South Carolina. It was built about 1910, and is a two-story, three-bay, brick building. The front façade is faced with blond brick, marble, and cast stone. The first-floor has a three-bay arcade and the second story has three tall arched windows.

It was added to the National Register of Historic Places in 1986.
