= Ballentine, South Carolina =

Coordinates: 34°07′28″N 81°14′14″W

- Richland Library – Ballentine
- Interactive map of Ballentine, South Carolina
- Country: United States
- State: South Carolina
- County: Richland

Area
  - Land: 2.2 sq mi (5.6 km^{2})
- Time zone: UTC-5 (EST)
  - Summer (DST): UTC-4 (EDT)
- ZIP code: 29002 (Irmo)

Ballentine is an unincorporated community in Richland County, South Carolina, United States. It is part of the Columbia, South Carolina metropolitan area.

== 2020 census ==
Ballentine racial composition
Race	Num.	Perc.
White (non-Hispanic)	6,876	84.78%
Black or African American (non-Hispanic)	464	5.72%
Native American	8	0.1%
Asian	214	2.64%
Pacific Islander	3	0.04%
Other/Mixed	294	3.63%
Hispanic or Latino	251	3.09%

As of the 2020 United States census, there were 8,110 people, 2,495 households, and 1,909 families residing in the CDP.

== History ==
The community was named after the Ballentine family of pioneer settlers.

In 1925, Ballentine had 50 inhabitants.

There have been unsuccessful attempts to incorporate Ballentine as a town.

The John Jacob Calhoun Koon Farmstead was added to the National Register of Historic Places in 1986.

== Education ==
Public education in Ballentine is administered by Lexington & Richland County School District Five, which operates Ballentine Elementary School in the community.

Ballentine has its own public library, a branch of the Richland Library.
