= Harry R. E. Hampton =

American journalist

Harry Rutledge Elliott Hampton (1897–1980) was a South Carolina journalist and conservationist who was instrumental in the establishment of Congaree National Park.

== Life ==
Hampton was born at the Hampton family home, Woodlands, near Columbia, South Carolina, on July 8, 1897. He was the second son of Frank Hampton Jr. and Gertrude Gonzalez Hampton, and he was a grand-nephew of Confederate General Wade Hampton III. He attended Columbia High School, Randolph-Macon Academy and the University of South Carolina, graduating in 1919. He continued post-graduate study in English at USC in 1920–21.

Hampton became a reporter at The State in Columbia. The State was founded by his maternal uncles Narciso Gener, Ambrose E. and William E. Gonzales. Hampton served in a number of capacities, eventually becoming co-editor. An avid hunter, Hampton was interested in conservation issues. Between 1930 and 1964 Hampton wrote his Woods and Water column, emphasizing outdoors and conservation topics, as well as a Sunday column titled The State's Survey. In 1931 he organized a fish and game association that evolved into the South Carolina Wildlife Federation (SCWF), of which Hampton was president. Hampton and the SCWF supported the legislation that established South Carolina's state wildlife resource agencies in 1952. Hampton 's work was described as "the first major effort in South Carolina to bring collective action to the ideal of conservation."

Beginning in the 1950s Hampton promoted the preservation of the Beidler Tract, an area of floodplain forest on the Congaree River that contained some of the tallest trees in the eastern United States. In 1976 the tract was designated Congaree Swamp National Monument by Congress. It became Congaree National Park in 2003. The park's Harry Hampton Visitor Center was named in Hampton's honor.

Hampton died on November 16, 1980. He is buried at Trinity Episcopal Cathedral in Columbia, having lived his entire life at Woodlands. The Harry Hampton Memorial Wildlife Fund was established to memorialize Hampton and to endow scholarships in Hampton's name, as well as funding and organizing conservation projects in South Carolina.
