= St. Phillip School =

- U.S. National Register of Historic Places
- Location within South Carolina Location within the United States
- Nearest city: 4350 McCords Ferry Rd., near Eastover, South Carolina
- Coordinates: 33°50′56″N 80°39′07″W
- Area: 4 acres (1.6 ha)
- Built: 1938
- Architectural style: Early 20th-century rural school
- MPS: African-American Primary and Secondary School Buildings MPS
- NRHP reference No.: 96000383
- Added to NRHP: April 19, 1996

St. Phillip School is a historic school building for African American students located near Eastover, Richland County, South Carolina. It was built in 1938, and is a one-story, three room school. The building is clad in shiplap weatherboard and rests on brick piers. The school closed in 1959.

It was added to the National Register of Historic Places in 1996.
