= Goodwill Plantation =

- U.S. National Register of Historic Places
- U.S. Historic district
- Location within South Carolina Location within the United States
- Location: Off U.S. Route 378, near Eastover, South Carolina
- Coordinates: 33°57′28″N 80°38′57″W
- Area: 3,285.7 acres (1,329.7 ha)
- MPS: Lower Richland County MRA
- NRHP reference No.: 86000528
- Added to NRHP: March 27, 1986

Goodwill Plantation is a historic plantation and national historic district located near Eastover, Richland County, South Carolina. The district encompasses 10 contributing buildings and two contributing structures. They include the millpond and a portion of the canal irrigation system (c. 1827); the overseer's house (c. 1857); the 2-1/2-story frame mill building (c. 1857 – 1870); two slave cabins (c. 1858); a blacksmith shop; the late-19th century main house; a lodge (c. 1910 – 1935); and a carriage house, tenant house, barn and corn crib.

The plantation was added to the National Register of Historic Places in 1986. According to its National Register nomination form, Goodwill Plantation is affiliated with owners P. T. Barnum, Daniel Huger, a delegate to the Continental Congress and member of the US House of Representatives; and Edward Barnwell Heyward, father of Duncan Clinch Heyward, the 88th Governor of South Carolina. Both were holders of enslaved persons, with Heyward sending close to 1000 to live at Goodwill during the Civil War. It is near Wateree River Heritage Preserve.
