= Greater Bethel AME Church (Manhattan) =

Church in Manhattan, New York

Coordinates: 40.806123°N 73.946183°W

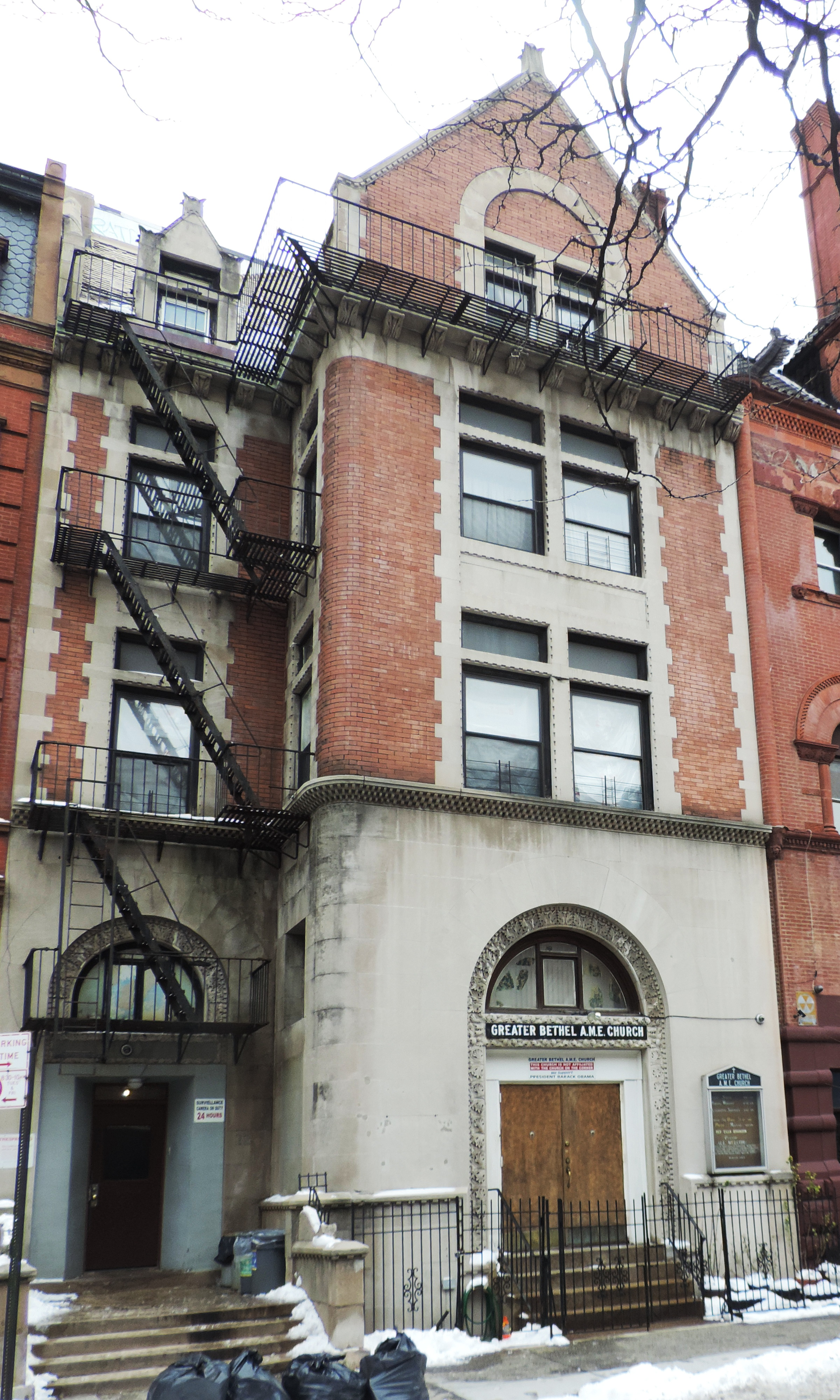
Greater Bethel A.M.E.

Greater Bethel AME Church is located at 32 West 123rd Street in Harlem. It is one of the oldest black churches in New York City. The Greater Bethel African Methodist Episcopal Church was founded in Lower Manhattan in 1819 and moved into the Harlem Library building in the early twentieth century.

Edgar K. Bourne, architect of this limestone and brick building constructed from 1891–1892, was also a member of the library's board of trustees. The church moved into the structure on West 123rd Street when the Harlem Library was moved to 9-11 West 124th Street after being added to the New York Public Library system in 1901. Greater Bethel is within the Mount Morris Park Historic District and as such is a designated New York City Landmark.
