= Grovewood =

Historic house in South Carolina, United States

- U.S. National Register of Historic Places
- Location within South Carolina Location within the United States
- Location: SC 769, Congaree, South Carolina
- Coordinates: 33°54′24″N 80°48′9″W
- Area: 2.5 acres (1.0 ha)
- Built: c. 1765, c. 1835
- MPS: Lower Richland County MRA
- NRHP reference No.: 86000530
- Added to NRHP: March 27, 1986

Grovewood, also known as Weston House, is a historic home near Congaree, Richland County, South Carolina. The original one-story dwelling was built about 1765, and moved to this site and enlarged to two-stories about 1835. It is a frame dwelling, with a stuccoed brick foundation, weatherboard siding, and a low hipped roof. Also on the property is a contributing frame kitchen.

It was added to the National Register of Historic Places in 1986.
