= John J. Kaminer House =

Historic house in South Carolina, United States

- U.S. National Register of Historic Places
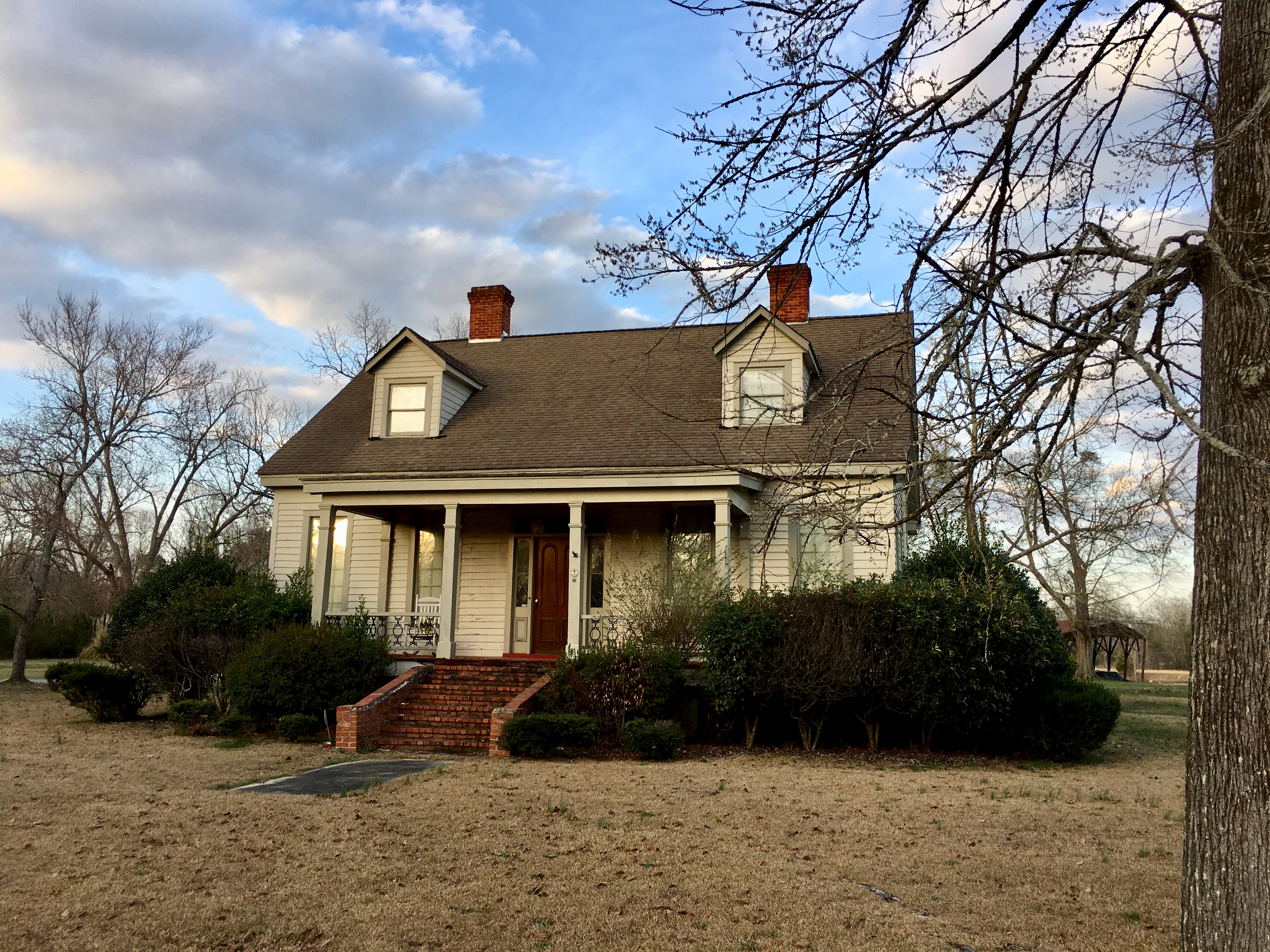

- Location within South Carolina Location within the United States
- Location: Near jct. of SC 48 and SC 769, Gadsden, South Carolina
- Coordinates: 33°50′43″N 80°45′40″W
- Area: 0.7 acres (0.28 ha)
- Built: c. 1880
- MPS: Lower Richland County MRA
- NRHP reference No.: 86000532
- Added to NRHP: March 27, 1986

John J. Kaminer House is a historic home located at Gadsden, Richland County, South Carolina. It was built about 1880, and is a 1 1/2-half-story, five-bay, frame cottage with a one-story rear ell. It is sheathed in weatherboard and has a gable roof with dormers. It features a shed-roofed front porch with cast-iron porch balusters.

It was added to the National Register of Historic Places in 1986.
