= Oakwood (Gadsden, South Carolina) =

Historic house in South Carolina, United States

- U.S. National Register of Historic Places
- Location within South Carolina Location within the United States
- Location: South Carolina Highway 48, near Gadsden, South Carolina
- Coordinates: 33°50′7″N 80°41′19″W
- Area: 7 acres (2.8 ha)
- Built: 1877
- Architectural style: Gothic, Vernacular Victorian
- MPS: Lower Richland County MRA
- NRHP reference No.: 86000544
- Added to NRHP: March 27, 1986

Oakwood, also known as Trumble Cottage, is a historic plantation house located near Gadsden, Richland County, South Carolina. It was built in 1877, and is a 1 1/2-story, vernacular Victorian frame cottage with Queen Anne style details. The front façade features a one-story porch with scroll-sawn brackets and a highly ornamented gabled dormer. Also on the property are two slave cabins, a double pen log barn, a corn crib, a frame well house, and another storage building.

It was added to the National Register of Historic Places in 1986.
