= Olympia Armory =

- U.S. National Register of Historic Places
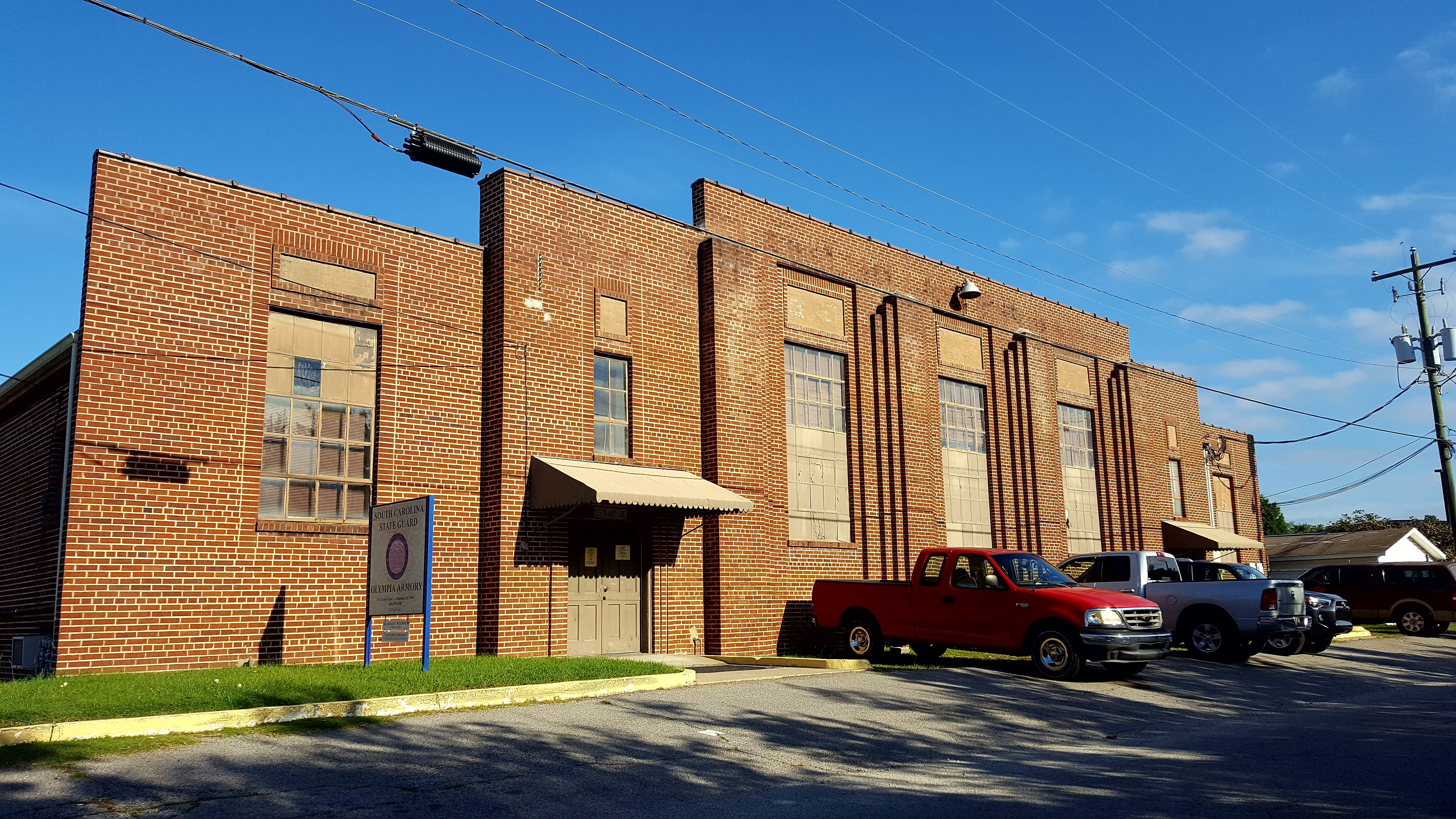

- Location within South Carolina Location within the United States
- Location: 511 Granby Ln. Olympia, South Carolina
- Coordinates: 33°58′34″N 81°1′40″W
- Area: less than one acre
- Built: 1936-1937
- Built by: Works Progress Administration
- Architectural style: Art Deco and Moderne
- NRHP reference No.: 94001571
- Added to NRHP: January 20, 1995

Olympia Armory is a historic National Guard armory located at Olympia, near Columbia, Richland County, South Carolina.

== History ==
The armory was built in 1936-1937 by the Works Progress Administration (WPA). It is a one-story, rectangular brick building with a barrel-vaulted roof and stepped parapeted end walls. The building displays Art Deco and Moderne design influences. It was used as a school gymnasium.

It was added to the National Register of Historic Places in 1996.

The Columbia Armory currently houses the headquarters of the South Carolina State Guard.
