= Saint Thomas' Protestant Episcopal Church =

Historic church in South Carolina, United States

- U.S. National Register of Historic Places
- Location within South Carolina Location within the United States
- Location: Near the junction of U.S. Route 601 and South Carolina Highway 263, near Eastover, South Carolina
- Coordinates: 33°54′12″N 80°40′38″W
- Area: 2.1 acres (0.85 ha)
- Built: 1892
- Architectural style: Gothic Revival
- MPS: Lower Richland County MRA
- NRHP reference No.: 86000539
- Added to NRHP: March 27, 1986

Saint Thomas' Protestant Episcopal Church is a historic Episcopal church dedicated to St. Thomas Aquinas. It was built in 1892 in Eastover, as a simple one-story frame church building, with Gothic Revival style design elements.

It was added to the National Register of Historic Places in 1986.
