= Farmers and Merchants Bank Building (Eastover, South Carolina) =

- U.S. National Register of Historic Places
- Location within South Carolina Location within the United States
- Location: Main St., Eastover, South Carolina
- Coordinates: 33°52′39″N 80°41′39″W
- Area: 0.1 acres (0.040 ha)
- Built: 1910
- MPS: Lower Richland County MRA
- NRHP reference No.: 86000541
- Added to NRHP: March 27, 1986

Farmers and Merchants Bank Building, also known as the Old Eastover Post Office, is a historic multi-purpose commercial building located at Eastover, Richland County, South Carolina. It was built about 1910, and is a two-story, brick and cast-stone building with an angled corner entrance.

It was added to the National Register of Historic Places in 1986.
