= Woodlands (Columbia, South Carolina) =

Historic house in South Carolina, United States

- U.S. National Register of Historic Places
- Location within South Carolina Location within the United States
- Location: 409 Old Woodlands Rd., Columbia, South Carolina
- Coordinates: 33°58′30″N 80°58′10″W
- Area: 14.3 acres (5.8 ha)
- Built: 1896
- Built by: Hampton, Frank, Jr.
- Architectural style: Folk Victorian
- NRHP reference No.: 05001572
- Added to NRHP: February 1, 2006

Woodlands is a historic home located near Columbia, Richland County, South Carolina. It was built in 1896, and is a two-story, wood-frame farmhouse with a cross-gable roof and classical and Folk Victorian ornamentation. The front facade features a grand two-tiered porch. Also on the property is a detached kitchen building. Woodlands was the home of Harry R. E. Hampton (1897-1980), a leading journalist and conservationist in South Carolina.

It was added to the National Register of Historic Places in 2006.
