= Siloam School (Eastover, South Carolina) =

- U.S. National Register of Historic Places
- Location within South Carolina Location within the United States
- Location: 1331 Congaree Rd., near Eastover, South Carolina
- Coordinates: 33°56′15″N 80°49′33″W
- Area: 0.1 acres (0.040 ha)
- Built: c. 1936
- Architectural style: Early 20th-century rural school
- MPS: African--American Primary and Secondary School Buildings MPS
- NRHP reference No.: 96000382
- Added to NRHP: April 15, 1996

Siloam School is a historic school building located at Eastover, Richland County, South Carolina. It was built about 1936, and is a one-story, two-room building built with funds from the Works Progress Administration (WPA). It stands on a brick pier foundation and is clad in shiplap weatherboard siding. It operated as a school for African-American children until 1956.

It was added to the National Register of Historic Places in 1996.

== See also ==
- National Register of Historic Places listings in Richland County, South Carolina
