= Purefoy-Chappell House and Outbuildings =

Historic house in North Carolina, United States

- U.S. National Register of Historic Places
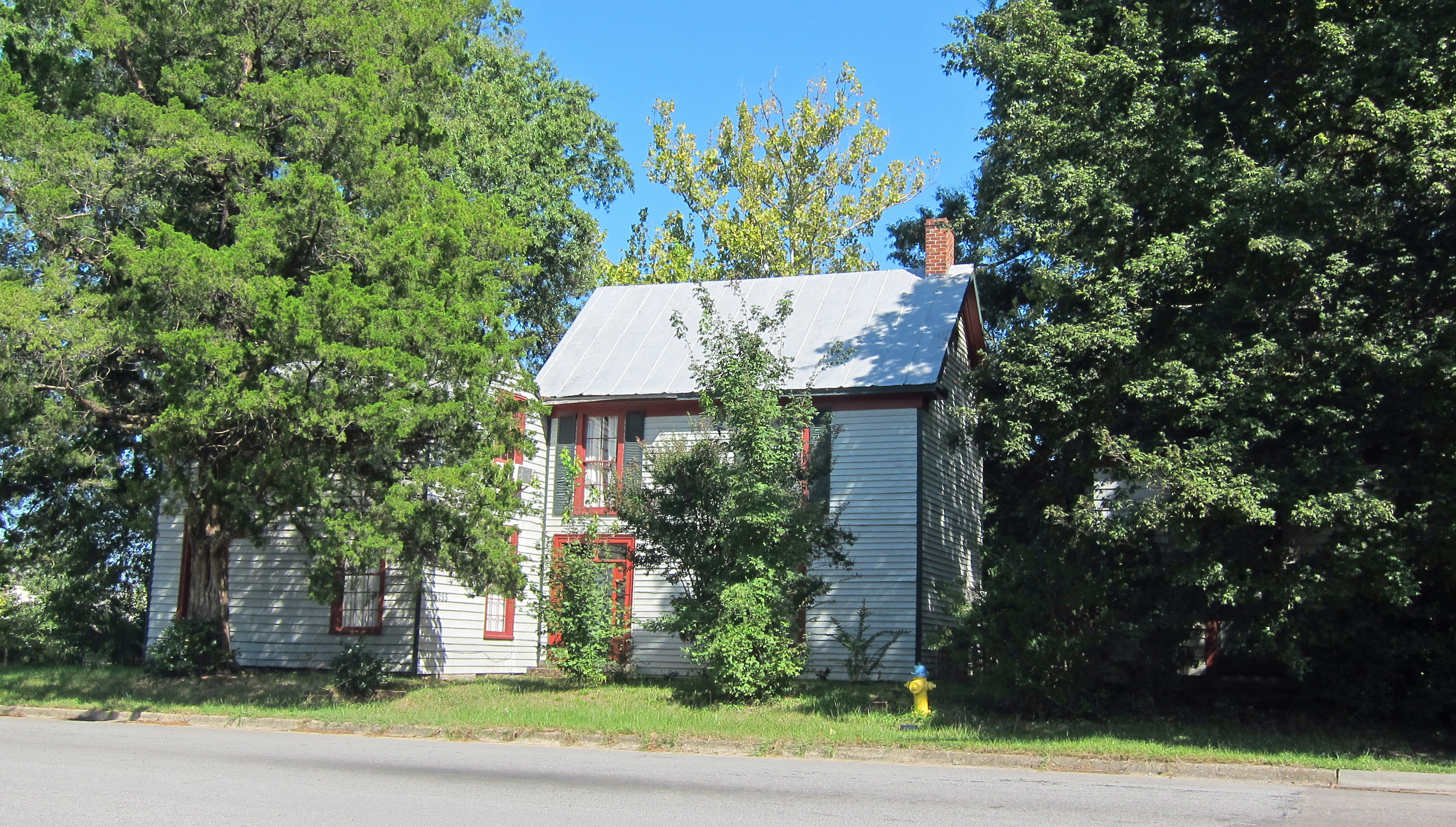
- Purefoy-Chappell House, September 2013

- Location within North Carolina Location within the United States
- Location: 1255 S. Main St., Wake Forest, North Carolina
- Coordinates: 35°57′43″N 78°31′5″W
- Area: 1 acre (0.40 ha)
- Built: c. 1838, c. 1862, c. 1895
- Architectural style: Greek Revival, one-room house
- MPS: Wake County MPS
- NRHP reference No.: 08001016
- Added to NRHP: October 22, 2008

Purefoy-Chappell House and Outbuildings is a historic home located at Wake Forest, Wake County, North Carolina. The house consists of four major sections: a 1 1/2-story, side-gable, single-pile main block with rear shed wing built about 1838; a two-story, side-gable, single-pile addition built about 1895 with vernacular Greek Revival-stylistic influences; a two-room side-gable kitchen / dining building dating to about 1838 that was connected to the main block and the addition by a one-story hyphen containing a modern kitchen added in 1974. Also on the property are the contributing smokehouse (c. 1838, c. 1900) and doctor's office (c. 1862).

It was listed on the National Register of Historic Places in 2008.
