= Richland Presbyterian Church =

Historic church in South Carolina, United States

- U.S. National Register of Historic Places
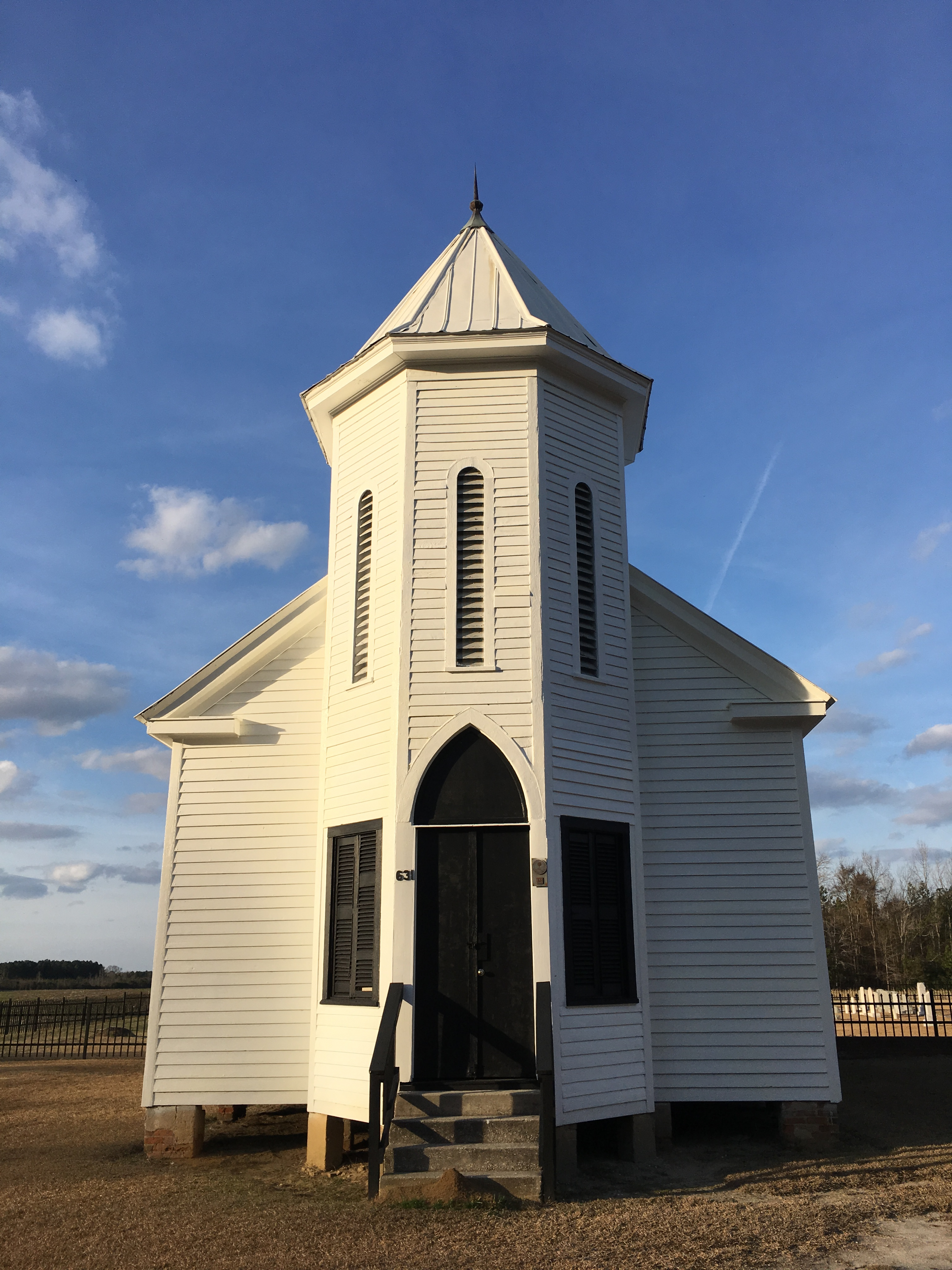

- Location within South Carolina Location within the United States
- Location: County Road 1313, near Gadsden, South Carolina
- Coordinates: 33°50′38″N 80°42′3″W
- Area: 1.5 acres (0.61 ha)
- Built: 1883
- MPS: Lower Richland County MRA
- NRHP reference No.: 86000533
- Added to NRHP: March 27, 1986

Richland Presbyterian Church is a historic Presbyterian church located near Gadsden, Richland County, South Carolina. It was built in 1840 and is a one-story, rectangular meeting house form frame church with an octagonal entrance tower. The building remained in use until 1922.

It was added to the National Register of Historic Places in 1986.
