= John Jacob Calhoun Koon Farmstead =

- U.S. National Register of Historic Places
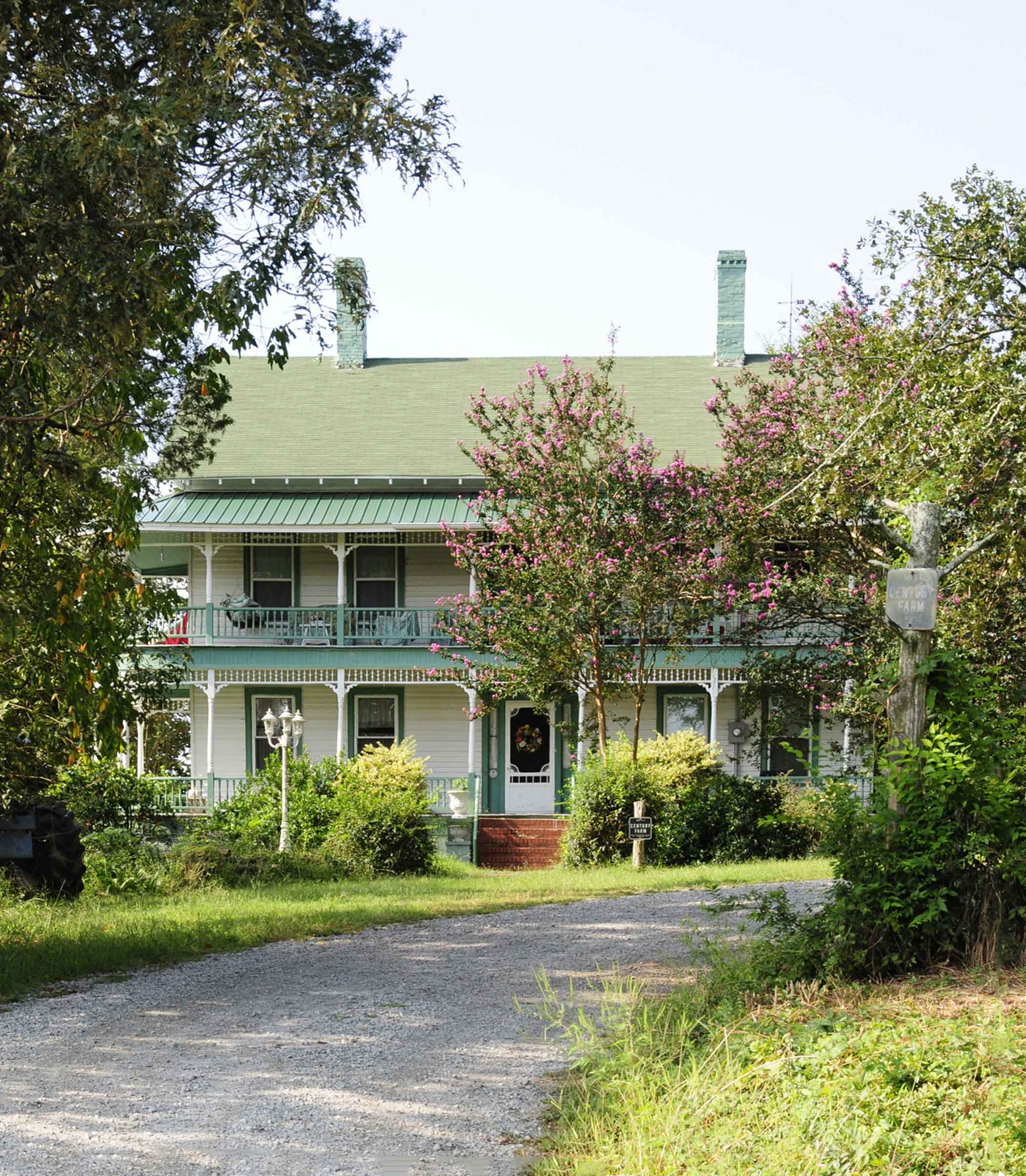
- John Jacob Calhoun Koon Farmstead, September 2012

- Location within South Carolina Location within the United States
- Location: County Road 27 off U.S. Routes 76/176, near Ballentine, South Carolina
- Coordinates: 34°06′51″N 81°12′24″W
- Area: 132.7 acres (53.7 ha)
- Built: c. 1890
- NRHP reference No.: 86000590
- Added to NRHP: March 27, 1986

John Jacob Calhoun Koon Farmstead is a historic home and farm located near Ballentine, Richland County, South Carolina, USA. The house was built in about 1890, and is a two-story farmhouse with a two-tiered Victorian influenced wraparound porch. It has a one-story, gable roofed frame rear addition. Also on the property are the contributing frame grain barn (c. 1920), a frame cotton house (c. 1900), a frame workshop/toolhouse (c. 1900), a late-19th century shed, a planing shed (c. 1920) and a sawmill (c. 1928).

It was added to the National Register of Historic Places in 1986.
