= Bradley's Covered Bridge =

- Formerly listed on the U.S. National Register of Historic Places
- Location within South Carolina Location within the United States
- Nearest city: Troy, South Carolina
- Coordinates: 34.014488°N 82.344313°W
- Area: less than one acre
- Built: 1892
- Architectural style: Howe truss
- NRHP reference No.: 77001512

Significant dates
- Added to NRHP: December 22, 1977
- Removed from NRHP: August 31, 1979

Bradley's Covered Bridge, also known as the Long Cane Covered Bridge, was a covered bridge located near Troy, South Carolina.

Until its fiery destruction by vandals, the Long Cane Covered Bridge, listed in the National Register of Historic Places in 1977, was one of three covered bridges in South Carolina. The bridge was constructed in 1892 by Y.P. Reagan to replace an earlier bridge, which had been washed away in January 1892. The new bridge was originally called "Bradley's Bridge" because it was close by John Bradley's mill.

The covered bridge was built in the Howe style, a type of construction, which introduced iron rods into the bridge trusses. That popular design served as a transition from wooden bridges to those built of iron and steel. The bridge was 30 feet high and spanned 163 feet over Long Cane Creek. It rested on two stone abutments with four supporting piers in the creek bed. The bridge consisted of thirteen boxed X-panel trusses with stabilizing iron turnbuckles. Vertical board and batten siding covered the X-panel trusses and was irregularly cut and remained unpainted. The bridge portals were covered with unpainted wooden clapboards, and the roof was covered with tin.

The bridge was destroyed by an arsonist on July 8, 1979, and was subsequently removed from the National Register on August 31, 1979.
