= Magnolia (Gadsden, South Carolina) =

Historic house in South Carolina, United States

- U.S. National Register of Historic Places
- Location within South Carolina Location within the United States
- Location: Adams Hayne Rd., near Gadsden, South Carolina
- Coordinates: 33°54′33.7″N 80°48′48″W
- Area: 3.3 acres (1.3 ha)
- Built: c. 1855
- Architectural style: Greek Revival
- MPS: Lower Richland County MRA
- NRHP reference No.: 86000536
- Added to NRHP: March 27, 1986

Magnolia, now known as Wavering Place also previously known as the Francis Tucker Hopkins House, is a historic plantation house located near Gadsden, Richland County, South Carolina. It was built about 1855, and is a two-story, Greek Revival style frame building with a full stuccoed brick basement and weatherboard siding. The front facade features a portico with columns rest on tall stuccoed pedestals. Also on the property are a brick kitchen/office, a frame smokehouse and two one-story frame slave houses.

It was added to the National Register of Historic Places in 1986.
