= Good Hope Baptist Church =

Historic church in South Carolina, United States

- U.S. National Register of Historic Places
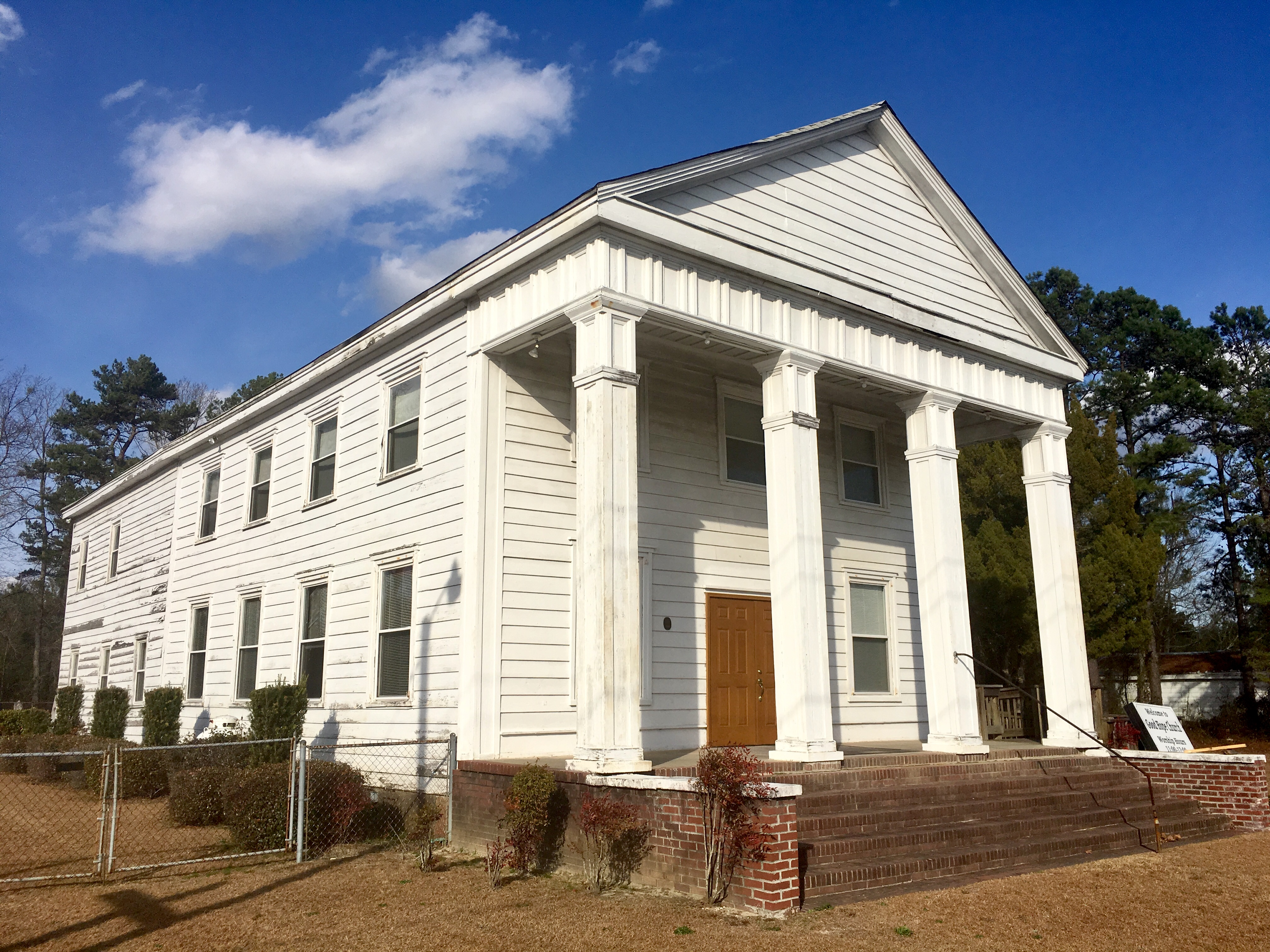

- Location within South Carolina Location within the United States
- Location: U.S. Route 378 near Sandhill Rd., near Eastover, South Carolina
- Coordinates: 33°56′23″N 80°42′41″W
- Area: 1 acre (0.40 ha)
- Built: 1857
- Architect: McLaughlin, John
- Architectural style: Greek Revival
- MPS: Lower Richland County MRA
- NRHP reference No.: 86000537
- Added to NRHP: March 27, 1986

Good Hope Baptist Church is a historic Southern Baptist church located near Eastover, Richland County, South Carolina. It was built in 1857, and is a two-story, rectangular frame building. It has a front gable roof and a full height Greek Revival front portico.

It was added to the National Register of Historic Places in 1986.
