= Harry Hampton (cricketer) =

English cricketer

Harry Hampton (1773 – 12 November 1845) was an English professional cricketer who played during the early 19th century.

Hampton was born in Surrey in 1773. He made his debut in 1800 for Surrey in 1800 and went on to make a total of six appearances in important matches, his last in 1811.

Hampton died at Peckham, then in Surrey, in 1845.

== Bibliography ==
- Carlaw, Derek (2020). Kent County Cricketers, A to Z: Part One (1806–1914) (PDF). Cardiff: ACS.
