= Chappell House (Cedar Creek, South Carolina) =

Historic farm house in South Carolina, US

The Chappell House, also known as the Howell House, in Cedar Creek, South Carolina, is a historic farm house built in 1830. The home is an I-house that features a Greek Revival portico and a later addition. The original builder and owner is unknown, but it has been in the Chappell family since 1880. It was listed on the National Register of Historic Places in 1986.

The listing includes five contributing buildings.
