= Gadsden, South Carolina =

- Census-designated place
- Location in Richland County and the state of South Carolina.
- Coordinates: 33°50′53″N 80°45′50″W
- Country: United States
- State: South Carolina
- County: Richland

Area
  - Total: 11.51 sq mi (29.80 km^{2})
  - Land: 11.51 sq mi (29.80 km^{2})
  - Water: 0 sq mi (0.00 km^{2})
- Elevation: 151 ft (46 m)

Population (2020)
  - Total: 1,301
  - Density: 113.1/sq mi (43.66/km^{2})
- Time zone: UTC-5 (Eastern (EST))
  - Summer (DST): UTC-4 (EDT)
- ZIP code: 29052
- FIPS code: 45-27970
- GNIS feature ID: 2629827

Gadsden is a census-designated place in Richland County, South Carolina, United States. The population was 1,632 at the 2010 census. It is part of the Columbia, South Carolina metropolitan area.

== History ==
The John J. Kaminer House, Magnolia, Oakwood, and Richland Presbyterian Church are listed on the National Register of Historic Places.

== Geography ==
Gadsden is located at latitude 33.846 North and longitude 80.766 West. The elevation is 148 feet (45 m) above sea level. According to the U.S. Census Bureau, the town has an area of 11.5 square miles (29.8 km^{2}), of which 0.008 square miles (0.02 km^{2}), or 0.06%, is water. The community is located at the intersection of state highways 48 and 769.

== Demographics ==
Historical population
Census	Pop.	Note	%±
2010	1,632		—
2020	1,301		−20.3%
U.S. Decennial Census

=== Racial and ethnic composition ===
Gadsden CDP, South Carolina – Racial and ethnic composition Note: the US Census treats Hispanic/Latino as an ethnic category. This table excludes Latinos from the racial categories and assigns them to a separate category. Hispanics/Latinos may be of any race.
Race / Ethnicity (NH = Non-Hispanic)	Pop 2010	Pop 2020	% 2010	% 2020
White alone (NH)	65	83	3.98%	6.38%
Black or African American alone (NH)	1,529	1,154	93.69%	88.70%
Native American or Alaska Native alone (NH)	3	2	0.18%	0.15%
Asian alone (NH)	1	1	0.06%	0.08%
Native Hawaiian or Pacific Islander alone (NH)	0	0	0.00%	0.00%
Other race alone (NH)	3	18	0.18%	1.38%
Mixed race or Multiracial (NH)	11	19	0.67%	1.46%
Hispanic or Latino (any race)	20	24	1.23%	1.84%
Total	1,632	1,301	100.00%	100.00%

=== 2020 census ===
As of the 2020 United States census, there were 1,301 people, 546 households, and 425 families residing in the Town.

== Education ==
Richland County School District One operates area public schools. Gadsden Elementary School is in Gadsden. Gadsden is zoned to Gadsden Elementary, Southeast Middle School, and Lower Richland High School.
