= Eastover, South Carolina =

- Town
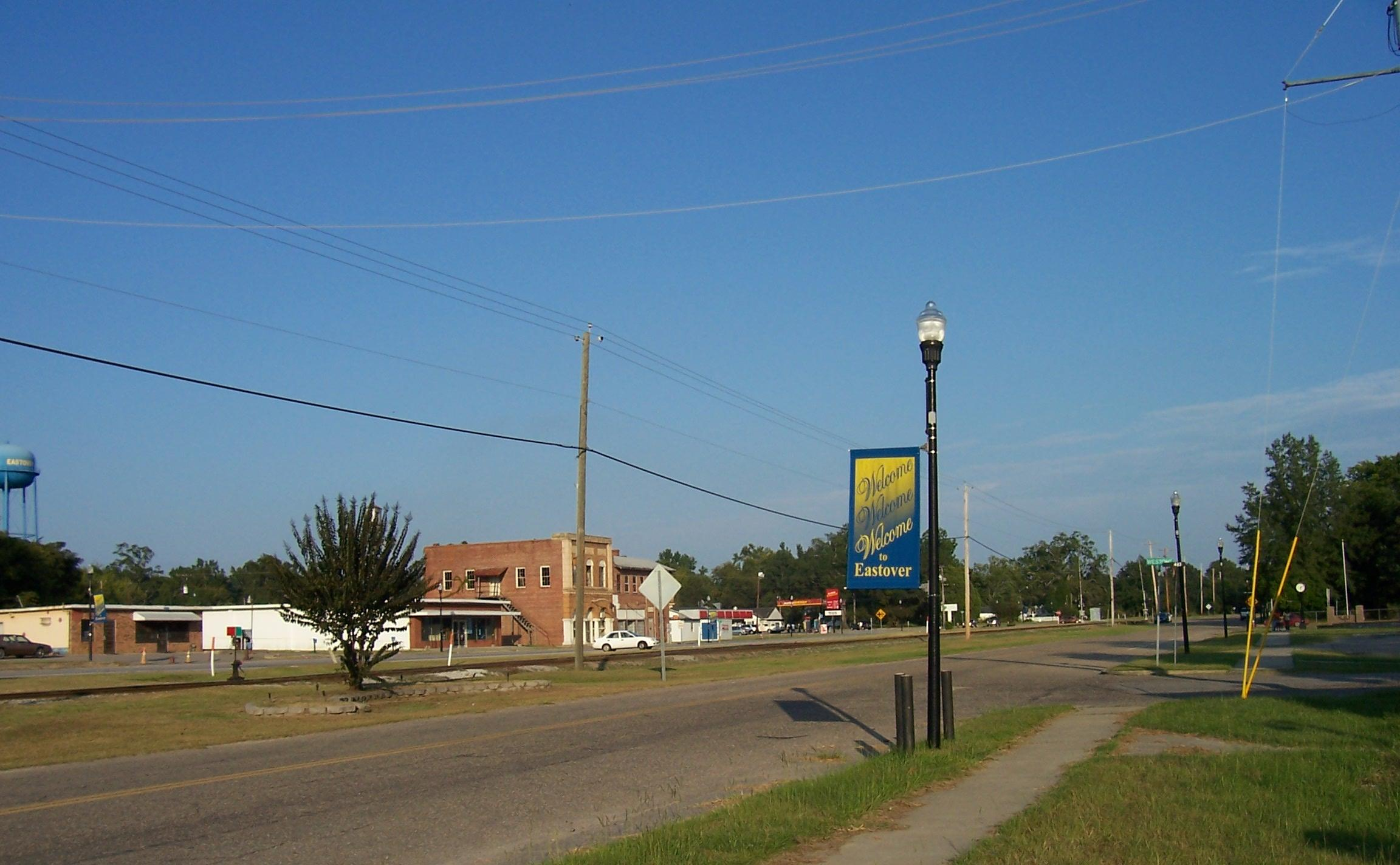
- Main Street

- Location in Richland County and the state of South Carolina.
- Coordinates: 33°52′30″N 80°41′40″W
- Country: United States
- State: South Carolina
- County: Richland

Area
  - Total: 1.22 sq mi (3.15 km^{2})
  - Land: 1.22 sq mi (3.15 km^{2})
  - Water: 0 sq mi (0.00 km^{2})
- Elevation: 190 ft (58 m)

Population (2020)
  - Total: 614
  - Density: 505.6/sq mi (195.23/km^{2})
- Time zone: UTC-5 (EST)
  - Summer (DST): UTC-4 (EDT)
- ZIP code: 29044
- Area codes: 803, 839
- FIPS code: 45-22390
- GNIS feature ID: 2406416
- Website: http://www.eastoversc.com

Eastover is a town in Richland County, South Carolina, United States. As of the 2020 census, Eastover had a population of 614. It is part of the Columbia, South Carolina, Metropolitan Statistical Area.

== History ==
The J.A. Byrd Mercantile Store, Farmers and Merchants Bank Building, Good Hope Baptist Church, Goodwill Plantation, Kensington Plantation House, St. Phillip School, Saint Thomas' Protestant Episcopal Church, Claudius Scott Cottage, and Siloam School are listed on the National Register of Historic Places.

== Geography ==
According to the United States Census Bureau, the town has a total area of 1.2 square miles (3.1 km^{2}), all land.

== Demographics ==
Historical population
Census	Pop.	Note	%±
1910	237		—
1920	326		37.6%
1930	393		20.6%
1940	473		20.4%
1950	564		19.2%
1960	713		26.4%
1970	817		14.6%
1980	899		10.0%
1990	1,044		16.1%
2000	830		−20.5%
2010	813		−2.0%
2020	614		−24.5%
U.S. Decennial Census

=== 2020 census ===
Eastover town, South Carolina – Racial and ethnic composition Note: the US Census treats Hispanic/Latino as an ethnic category. This table excludes Latinos from the racial categories and assigns them to a separate category. Hispanics/Latinos may be of any race.
Race / Ethnicity (NH = Non-Hispanic)	Pop 2000	Pop 2010	Pop 2020	% 2000	% 2010	% 2020
White alone (NH)	56	40	18	6.75%	4.92%	2.93%
Black or African American alone (NH)	767	751	563	92.41%	92.37%	91.69%
Native American or Alaska Native alone (NH)	0	3	0	0.00%	0.37%	0.00%
Asian alone (NH)	1	0	4	0.12%	0.00%	0.65%
Native Hawaiian or Pacific Islander alone (NH)	0	0	0	0.00%	0.00%	0.00%
Other race alone (NH)	0	0	0	0.00%	0.00%	0.00%
Mixed race or Multiracial (NH)	4	10	19	0.48%	1.23%	3.09%
Hispanic or Latino (any race)	2	9	10	0.24%	1.11%	1.63%
Total	830	813	614	100.00%	100.00%	100.00%

As of the 2020 United States census, there were 614 people, 271 households, and 153 families residing in the town.

=== 2000 census ===
At the 2000 census, there were 830 people, 307 households and 228 families residing in the town. The population density was 670.8 inhabitants per square mile (259.0/km^{2}). There were 357 housing units at an average density of 288.5 per square mile (111.4/km^{2}). The racial makeup of the town was 92.26% African American, 6.87% White, 0.41% Asian, 0.12% from other races, and 0.48% from two or more races. Hispanic or Latino of any race were 0.24% of the population.

There were 307 households, of which 39.4% had children under the age of 18 living with them, 26.4% were married couples living together, 43.0% had a female householder with no husband present, and 25.7% were non-families. 23.5% of all households were made up of individuals, and 9.4% had someone living alone who was 65 years of age or older. The average household size was 2.64 and the average family size was 3.07.

32.4% of the population were under the age of 18, 10.6% from 18 to 24, 24.7% from 25 to 44, 21.7% from 45 to 64, and 10.6% who were 65 years of age or older. The median age was 32 years. For every 100 females, there were 81.2 males. For every 100 females age 18 and over, there were 67.0 males.

The median household income was $20,114 and the median family income was $19,844. Males had a median income of $23,250 versus $17,875 for females. The per capita income for the town was $9,304. About 36.9% of families and 37.3% of the population were below the poverty line, including 53.1% of those under age 18 and 30.0% of those age 65 or over.

== Education ==
Richland County School District One operates area public schools.

Webber Elementary School is in Eastover. Eastover is zoned to Webber Elementary, Southeast Middle School, and Lower Richland High School.

== Points of interest ==
Eastover is the site of McEntire Joint National Guard Base and the headquarters for the South Carolina Air National Guard.

South Carolina Electric & Gas Company's Wateree Station 700 megawatt coal power plant is located here.

South Carolina's only national park, the Congaree National Park, is twelve miles southwest of Eastover. Eastover is the closest municipality to the park.

== Notable people ==
- Lewis C. Dowdy
- Sarah Mae Flemming
- Annie B. Martin
- Jacob Stroyer

== Politics and government ==
Eastover is in South Carolina's 6th congressional district.

Eastover has a Mayor Council form of government. The current mayor is James Faber. Other members of Council: Leroy Faber, Mayor Pro Tem; Heyward Patterson, Latesha Campbell and Dedrick Edwards. Melissa Cowan is Town Clerk.
