= Congaree National Park =

National park in South Carolina, United States

- IUCN category Ib (wilderness area)
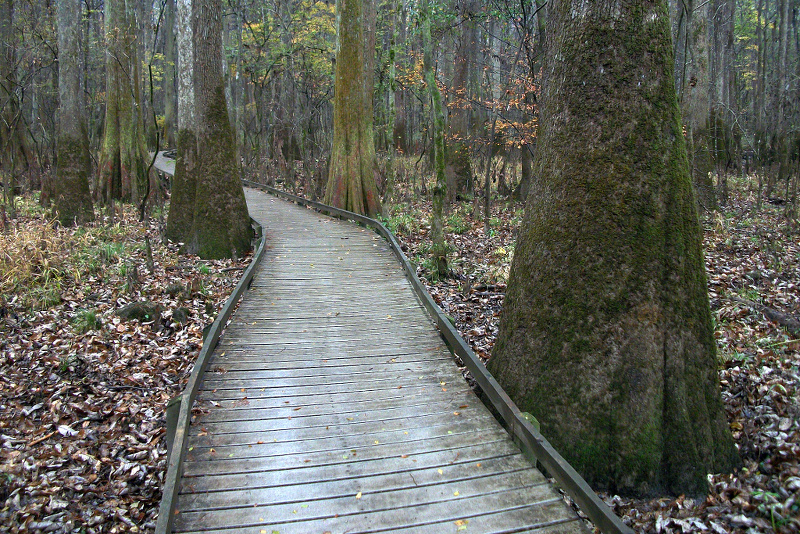
- Boardwalk passes through old growth forest of bald cypress and water tupelo

- Location within South Carolina Location within the United States
- Interactive map of Congaree National Park
- Location: Richland County, South Carolina, United States
- Nearest city: Eastover, South Carolina (town)
- Coordinates: 33°47′0″N 80°47′0″W
- Area: 26,692.6 acres (108.021 km^{2})
- Max. elevation: 140 feet (43 m)
- Min. elevation: 80 feet (24 m)
- Established: November 10, 2003
- Visitors: 287,833 (in 2025)
- Governing body: National Park Service
- Website: nps.gov/cong

Ramsar Wetland
- Designated: 2 February 2012
- Reference no.: 2030

U.S. National Natural Landmark
- Designated: May 1974

Congaree National Park is a 26,692.6-acre (41.7 sq mi; 108.0 km^{2}) national park of the United States in central South Carolina, 18 miles southeast of the state capital, Columbia. The park preserves the largest tract of old growth bottomland hardwood forest left in the United States. The lush trees growing in its floodplain forest are some of the tallest in the eastern United States, forming one of the highest temperate deciduous forest canopies remaining in the world. The Congaree River flows through the park. About 15,000 acres (23.4 sq mi; 60.7 km^{2}) are designated as a wilderness area.

The park received its official designation in 2003 as the culmination of a grassroots campaign that began in 1969. With 145,929 visitors in 2018, it ranks as the United States' 10th-least visited national park, just behind Nevada's Great Basin National Park.

== Park history ==
=== Pre-park ===
Resource extraction on the Congaree River centered on cypress logging from 1898 when the Santee River Cypress Logging Company began to operate in the area of what is now the park. Owned by Francis Beidler and Benjamin F. Ferguson of Chicago, the company operated until 1914; subsequently, Beidler and his heirs retained ownership of the area. In the 1950s Harry R. E. Hampton was a member of the Cedar Creek Hunt Club and co-editor of The State. Hampton joined with Peter Manigault at the Charleston The Post and Courier to advocate preservation of the Congaree floodplain. Hampton formed the Beidler Forest Preservation Association in 1961. As a result of this advocacy a 1963 study by the National Park Service reported favorably on the establishment of a national monument.

=== Monument establishment ===
No progress was made in the 1960s. Renewed logging by the Beidlers in 1969 prompted the 1972 formation of the Congaree Swamp National Preserve Association (CSNPA). The CSNPA joined forces with the Sierra Club and other conservation organizations to promote federal legislation to preserve the tract. South Carolina Senators Strom Thurmond and Ernest F. Hollings introduced legislation in 1975 for the establishment of a national preserve. On October 18, 1976, legislation was passed to create Congaree Swamp National Monument. An expansion plan was introduced by Hollings and Thurmond in 1988, expanding the monument to 22,200 acres (34.7 sq mi; 89.8 km^{2}).

=== Conversion to a national park ===
Over two-thirds of the national monument was designated a wilderness area on October 24, 1988, and it became an Important Bird Area on July 26, 2001. Congress redesignated the monument Congaree National Park on November 10, 2003, dropping the misleading "swamp" from the name, and simultaneously expanded its authorized boundary by approximately 4,576 acres (7.2 sq mi; 18.5 km^{2}). As of December 31, 2011, approximately 26,021 acres (40.7 sq mi; 105.3 km^{2}) of the park are in federal ownership.

== Natural history ==
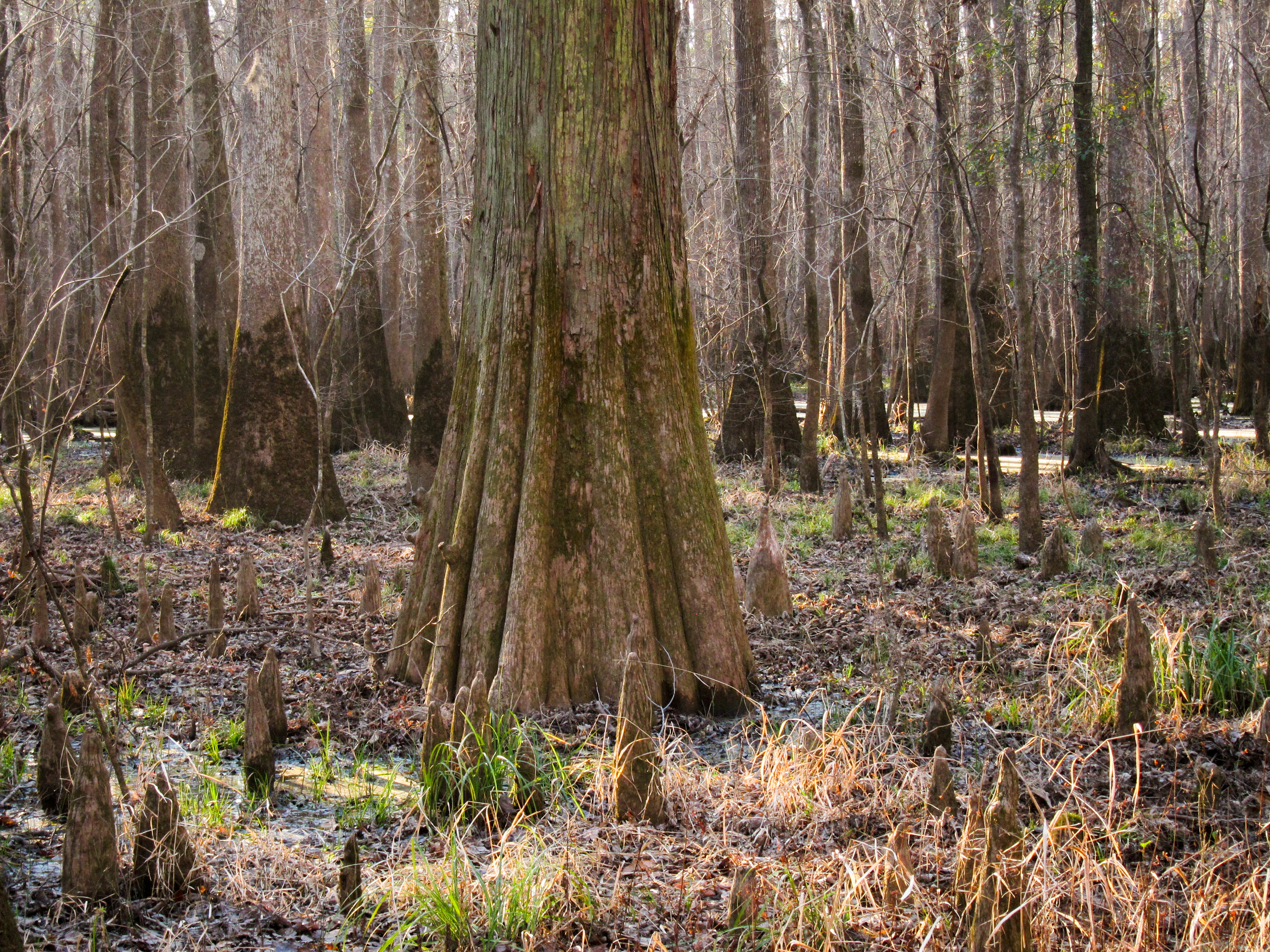
Old growth forest

The park preserves a significant part of the Middle Atlantic coastal forests ecoregion. Although it is frequently referred to as a swamp, it is largely bottomland subject to periodic inundation by floodwaters.

It has been designated an old growth forest and part of the Old Growth Forest Network. The park also has one of the largest concentrations of champion trees in the world, with the tallest known examples of 15 species. Champion trees include a 167-foot (51 m) 361-point loblolly pine, a 157-foot (48 m) 384-point sweetgum, a 154-foot (47 m) 465-point cherrybark oak, a 135-foot (41 m) 354-point American elm, a 133-foot (41 m) 356-point swamp chestnut oak, a 131-foot (40 m) 371-point overcup oak, and a 127-foot (39 m) 219-point common persimmon.

Large animals possibly seen in the park include Bobcats, White-tailed deer, Feral pigs, Feral dogs, Coyotes, Nine-banded armadillos, Wild turkeys, North American river otters, Racoons, and Virginia opossums. Its waters contain interesting creatures like Amphibians, turtles including the Spotted turtle and Eastern box turtle, snakes such as the Corn snake and Timber rattlesnake, and many types of fish, including Bowfin, Alligator gar, and Channel Catfish.

== Amenities and attractions ==
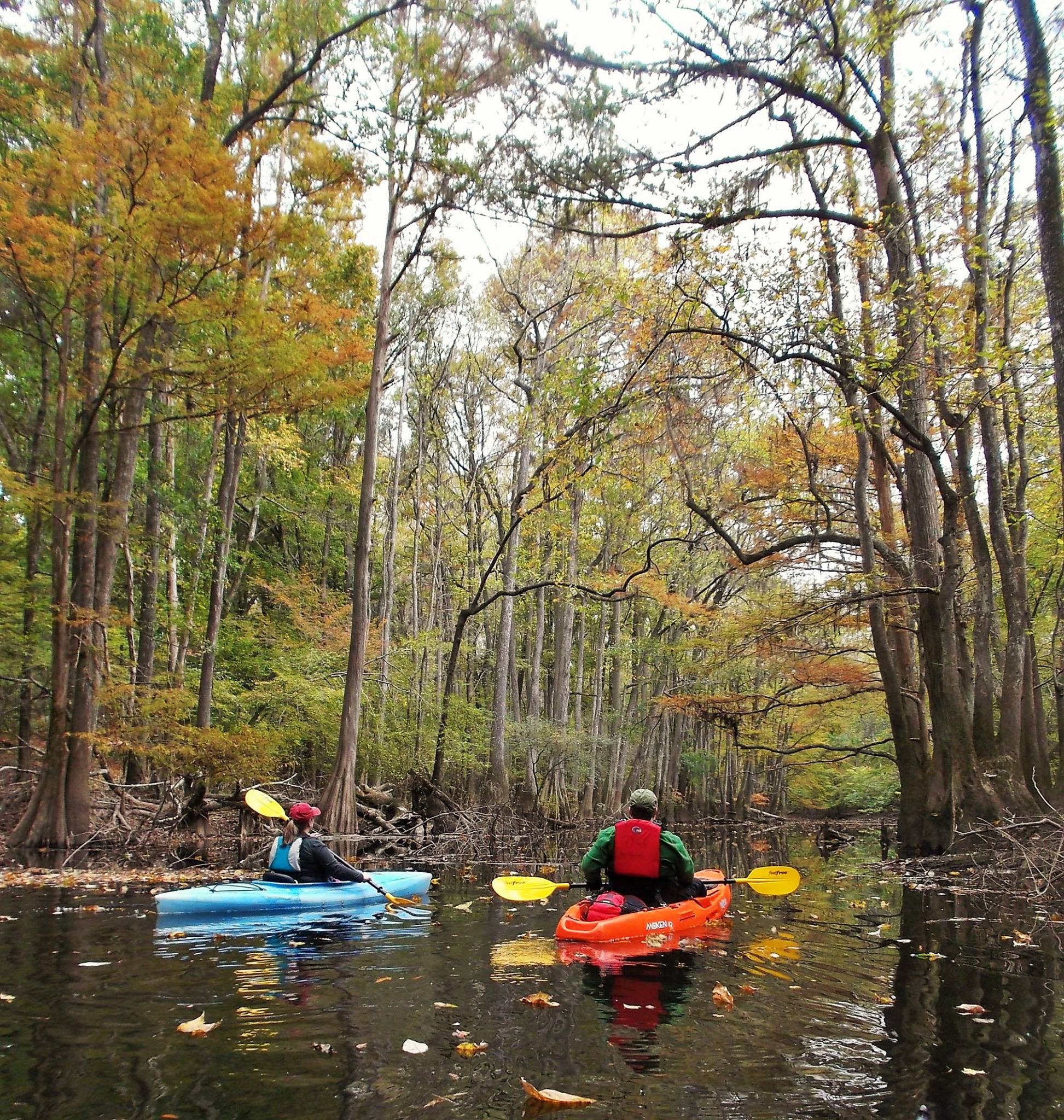
Kayakers paddle on Cedar Creek

In addition to being a designated wilderness area, a UNESCO biosphere reserve, an important bird area and a national natural landmark, Congaree National Park features primitive campsites and offers hiking, canoeing, kayaking, and bird watching. The park is also a popular spot for watching firefly displays on summer evenings. Primitive and backcountry camping are available. Some of the hiking trails include the Bluff Trail (0.7 mi), Weston Lake Loop Trail (4.6 mi), Oakridge Trail (7.5 mi), and King Snake Trail (11.1 mi) where hikers may spot deer, raccoon, opossum, and even bobcat tracks. The National Park Service rangers have current trail conditions which can be found in the Harry Hampton Visitor Center. Along with hiking trails, the park also has a 20-mile (32 km) marked canoe trail on Cedar Creek.

Most visitors to the park walk along the Boardwalk Loop, an elevated 2.4-mile (3.9 km) walkway through the swampy environment that protects delicate fungi and plant life at ground level. Congaree boasts both the tallest (169 ft; 52 m) and largest (42 cubic meters) loblolly pines (Pinus taeda) alive today as well as several cypress trees well over 500 years old. The Harry Hampton Visitor Center features exhibits about the natural history of the park, and the efforts to protect the swamp.

Monthly volunteer-led hikes are offered on some of the longer trails to give visitors an opportunity to get off the boardwalk and up close to nature.

== Climate ==
According to the Köppen climate classification system, Congaree National Park has a Humid subtropical climate (Cfa).

Climate data for Harry Hampton Visitor Center, 1991–2020 normals, extremes 1981–2021
| Month | Jan | Feb | Mar | Apr | May | Jun | Jul | Aug | Sep | Oct | Nov | Dec | Year |
|---|---|---|---|---|---|---|---|---|---|---|---|---|---|
| Record high °F (°C) | 81.2 (27.3) | 84.1 (28.9) | 89.1 (31.7) | 91.6 (33.1) | 99.6 (37.6) | 105.3 (40.7) | 105.1 (40.6) | 104.8 (40.4) | 98.1 (36.7) | 98.4 (36.9) | 85.6 (29.8) | 82.2 (27.9) | 105.3 (40.7) |
| Mean daily maximum °F (°C) | 57.6 (14.2) | 61.2 (16.2) | 68.6 (20.3) | 76.2 (24.6) | 83.0 (28.3) | 89.2 (31.8) | 92.3 (33.5) | 90.6 (32.6) | 85.7 (29.8) | 76.8 (24.9) | 67.5 (19.7) | 59.9 (15.5) | 75.8 (24.3) |
| Mean daily minimum °F (°C) | 34.4 (1.3) | 36.2 (2.3) | 42.7 (5.9) | 50.6 (10.3) | 59.6 (15.3) | 67.6 (19.8) | 71.1 (21.7) | 70.4 (21.3) | 64.6 (18.1) | 52.5 (11.4) | 41.3 (5.2) | 36.2 (2.3) | 52.3 (11.3) |
| Record low °F (°C) | 1.2 (−17.1) | 13.2 (−10.4) | 17.6 (−8.0) | 27.5 (−2.5) | 37.5 (3.1) | 47.4 (8.6) | 56.5 (13.6) | 54.8 (12.7) | 44.7 (7.1) | 29.3 (−1.5) | 18.8 (−7.3) | 8.5 (−13.1) | 1.2 (−17.1) |
| Average precipitation inches (mm) | 3.89 (99) | 3.58 (91) | 3.97 (101) | 3.12 (79) | 3.47 (88) | 4.97 (126) | 4.84 (123) | 5.01 (127) | 4.43 (113) | 3.55 (90) | 2.97 (75) | 3.77 (96) | 47.57 (1,208) |
| Average dew point °F (°C) | 35.7 (2.1) | 37.3 (2.9) | 42.7 (5.9) | 50.6 (10.3) | 60.2 (15.7) | 68.2 (20.1) | 71.8 (22.1) | 71.4 (21.9) | 66.3 (19.1) | 55.8 (13.2) | 44.9 (7.2) | 39.2 (4.0) | 53.8 (12.1) |
Source: PRISM

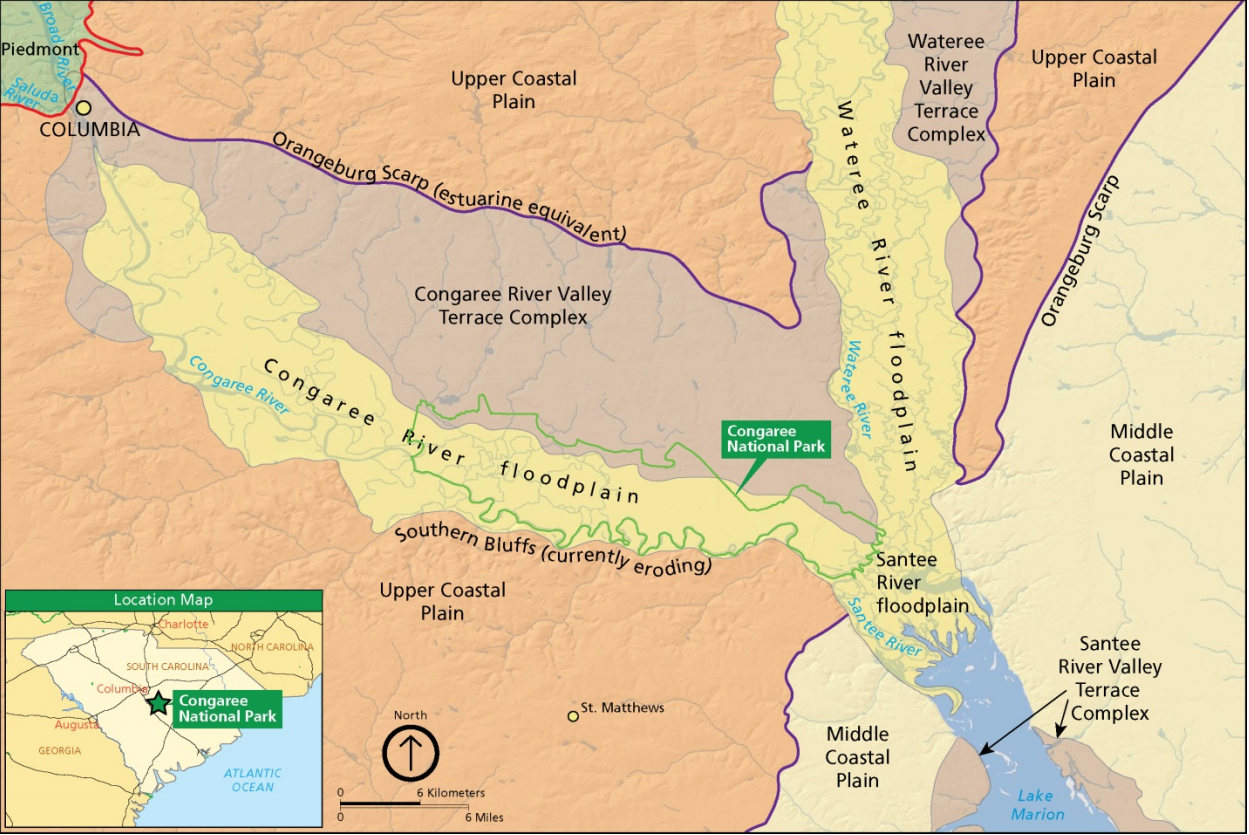
Geological map of the park

== Geology ==
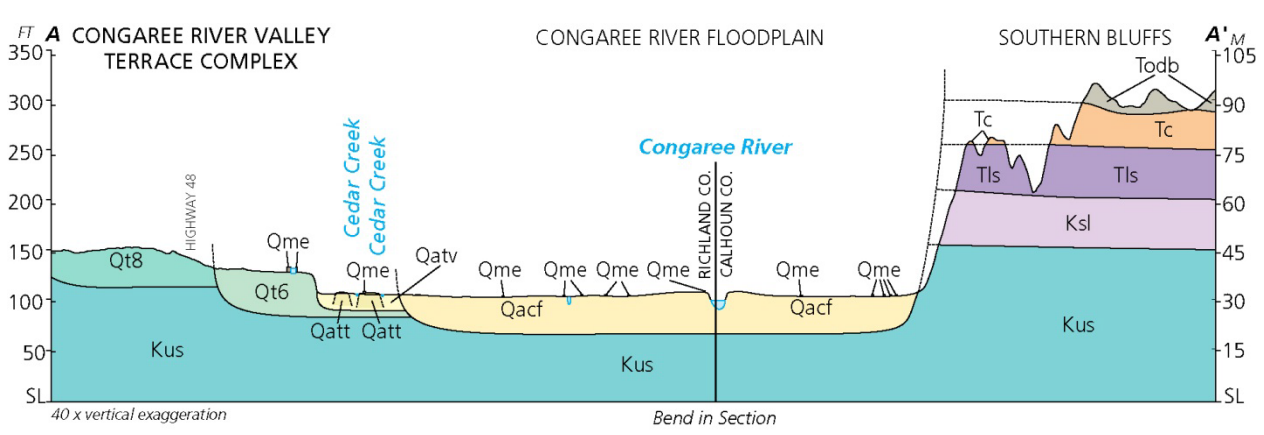
Park geologic cross section

The park resides entirely within the Congaree River Floodplain Complex with flood deposits of sand, silt, and clay. Muck and peat are the products of vegetation decay. The meander of the river has produced distinctive oxbow lakes. North of the park is the NE-SW regional trending Augusta Fault and the Terrace Complex consisting of Pliocene fluvial terraces. South of the park is the Southern Bluffs, which have been eroding since the Late Pleistocene. West of the park is the Fall Line and Piedmont.

== Documentary ==
In 2008, South Carolina Educational Television (SCETV) produced a documentary on the history of the Congaree National Park titled Roots in the River: The Story of Congaree National Park. The documentary featured interviews with people involved in the movement that eventually led to the area's U.S. National Monument status, and observed the role the park plays in the surrounding community of the Lower Richland County area of South Carolina. The program first aired on the SCETV network in September 2009.

== See also ==
- List of national parks of the United States
- List of National Natural Landmarks in South Carolina
