= Hopkins, South Carolina =

- Census-designated place
- Location in Richland County and the state of South Carolina.
- Coordinates: 33°53′20″N 80°52′36″W
- Country: United States
- State: South Carolina
- County: Richland

Area
  - Total: 16.53 sq mi (42.81 km^{2})
  - Land: 16.51 sq mi (42.76 km^{2})
  - Water: 0.023 sq mi (0.06 km^{2})
- Elevation: 151 ft (46 m)

Population (2020)
  - Total: 2,514
  - Density: 152/sq mi (58.8/km^{2})
- Time zone: UTC-5 (Eastern (EST))
  - Summer (DST): UTC-4 (EDT)
- ZIP code: 29061
- FIPS code: 45-34990
- GNIS feature ID: 2629831
- Website: www.epodunk.com/cgi-bin/genInfo.php?locIndex=13193

Hopkins is a census-designated place (CDP) in Richland County, South Carolina, United States. It was founded circa 1836 and named after John Hopkins (1739–1775). It is located 11 miles (18 km) southeast of downtown Columbia and is part of the Columbia Metropolitan Statistical Area. As of the 2010 census, the population of the Hopkins CDP was 2,882.

== Demographics ==
Historical population
Census	Pop.	Note	%±
2010	2,882		—
2020	2,514		−12.8%
U.S. Decennial Census

=== Racial and ethnic composition ===
Hopkins CDP, South Carolina – Racial and ethnic composition Note: the US Census treats Hispanic/Latino as an ethnic category. This table excludes Latinos from the racial categories and assigns them to a separate category. Hispanics/Latinos may be of any race.
Race / Ethnicity (NH = Non-Hispanic)	Pop 2010	Pop 2020	% 2010	% 2020
White alone (NH)	390	352	13.53%	14.00%
Black or African American alone (NH)	2,360	2,013	81.89%	80.07%
Native American or Alaska Native alone (NH)	7	3	0.24%	0.12%
Asian alone (NH)	5	5	0.17%	0.20%
Native Hawaiian or Pacific Islander alone (NH)	0	2	0.00%	0.08%
Other race alone (NH)	1	4	0.03%	0.16%
Mixed race or Multiracial (NH)	43	62	1.49%	2.47%
Hispanic or Latino (any race)	76	73	2.64%	2.90%
Total	2,882	2,514	100.00%	100.00%

=== 2020 census ===
As of the 2020 United States census, there were 2,514 people, 1,016 households, and 660 families residing in the CDP.

== Attractions ==
Hopkins is 6 miles (10 km) northwest of South Carolina's only national park, Congaree National Park, which is located off Bluff Road west of Gadsden. The Congaree National Park has contiguously preserved the largest tract of old-growth bottomland hardwood forest in the United States, and contains one of the tallest deciduous forests in the world. It has 27,000-acre (110 km^{2}) of land and water. The park was designated an international Biosphere, a Globally Important Bird Area, and a National Natural Landmark. While in the park one can hike, backpack, camp, canoe, fish, birdwatch, and study nature.

The city is also home to the Columbia South Carolina Temple of the Church of Jesus Christ of Latter-day Saints.

== Education ==
Richland County School District One operates public schools serving Hopkins. Residents are zoned to Hopkins Elementary School, Horrell Hill Elementary School, Hopkins Middle School, Southeast Middle School, and Lower Richland High School.

== Notable people ==
- Derwin Montgomery, North Carolina state legislator, grew up in Hopkins
- Joseph Neal, South Carolina state legislator, was born in Hopkins.
- Teyonah Parris, Emmy-nominated actress, grew up in Hopkins.
- David Patten, former NFL wide receiver with the New England Patriots
- A'ja Wilson, basketball player for the Las Vegas Aces, was born in Hopkins.
