= National Register of Historic Places listings in Lincoln County, Georgia =

This is a list of properties and districts in Lincoln County, Georgia that are listed on the National Register of Historic Places (NRHP).

This National Park Service list is complete through NPS recent listings posted March 21, 2025.

== Current listings ==
	Name on the Register	Image	Date listed	Location	City or town	Description
1	Amity School		September 21, 1993 (#93000933)	Clay Hill Rd. W of jct. with GA 43; 33°40′34″N 82°29′48″W	Lincolnton	
2	Chennault House	Chennault House	October 14, 1976 (#76000640)	NE of Danburg at jct. of GA 44 and GA 79; 33°54′22″N 82°36′29″W	Danburg	
3	Double Branches Historic District		September 21, 1993 (#93000934)	Double Branches Rd. SE of jct. with main GA 220; 33°44′39″N 82°19′14″W	Lincolnton	
4	Lamar-Blanchard House	Lamar-Blanchard House	September 30, 1982 (#82002450)	N. Washington and Ward Sts. 33°47′34″N 82°28′46″W	Lincolnton	
5	Lincoln County Courthouse	Lincoln County Courthouse	September 18, 1980 (#80001106)	Courthouse Sq. 33°47′40″N 82°28′33″W	Lincolnton	
6	Lincolnton Historic District	Lincolnton Historic District	September 21, 1993 (#93000932)	Roughly, along Washington, Peachtree, Goshen and Elm Sts. 33°47′29″N 82°28′38″W	Lincolnton	
7	Lincolnton Presbyterian Church and Cemetery	Lincolnton Presbyterian Church and Cemetery	August 26, 1982 (#82002451)	N. Washington St. 33°47′25″N 82°28′50″W	Lincolnton	
8	Matthews House	Matthews House	October 14, 1976 (#76000641)	NE of Danburg on GA 79; 33°54′16″N 82°35′43″W	Danburg	
9	Simmons-Cullars House	Simmons-Cullars House	December 9, 1999 (#99001473)	Jct. GA 79 and Co. Rd. 25; 33°51′48″N 82°30′24″W	Lincolnton	
10	Woodlawn Historic District		September 21, 1993 (#93000935)	Jct. of Salem Church and Woodlawn-Amity Rds. 33°42′20″N 82°26′54″W	Lincolnton	
