= Willis-Sale-Stennett House =

Historic house in Georgia, United States

- U.S. National Register of Historic Places
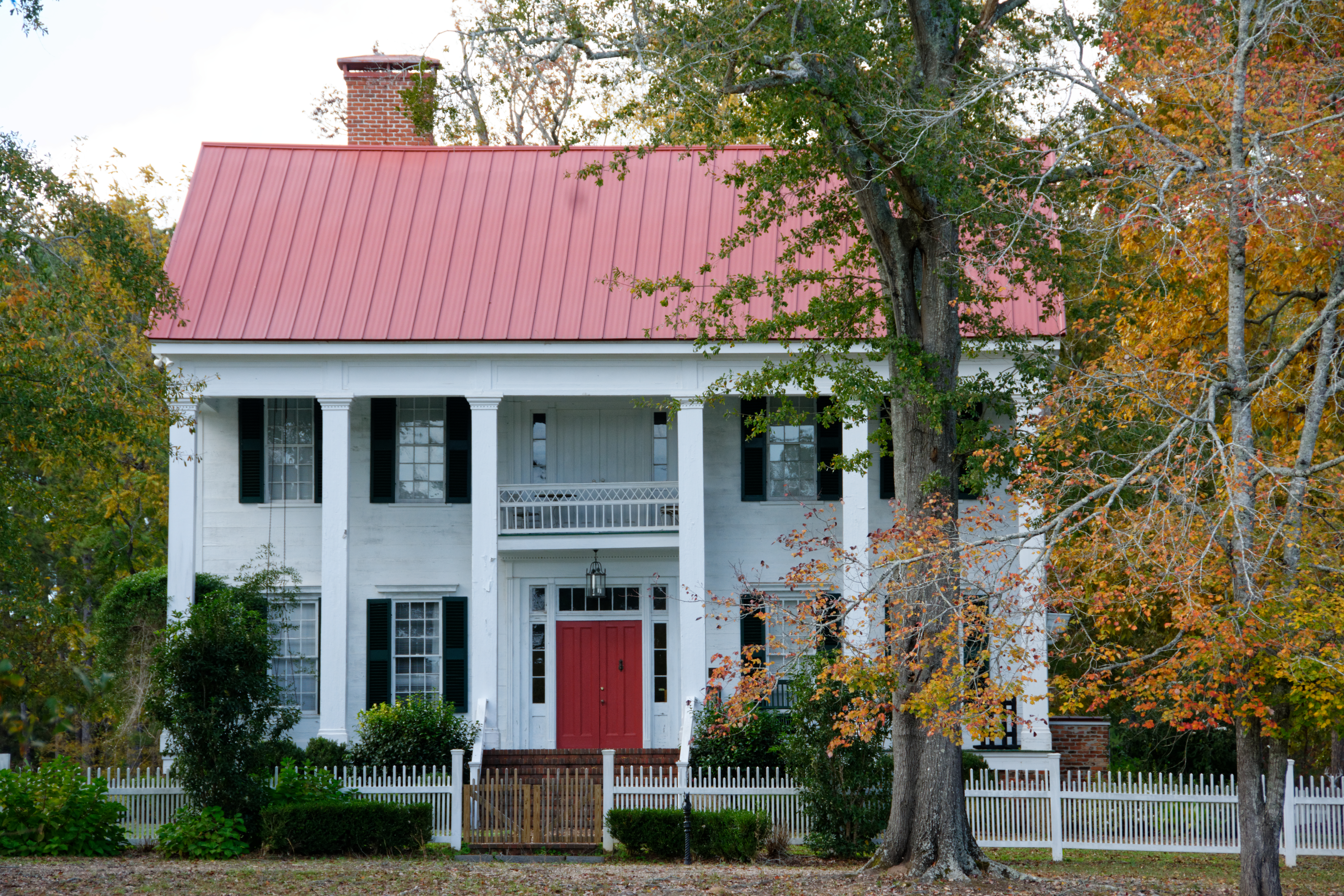
- The house in 2020

- Location within Georgia Location within the United States
- Nearest city: Danburg, Georgia
- Coordinates: 33.9221°N 82.6511°W
- Area: 34 acres (14 ha)
- Built: 1850
- Architectural style: Greek Revival
- NRHP reference No.: 76000658
- Added to NRHP: October 14, 1976

Willis-Sale-Stennett House, also known as Great Oaks, is a historic residence outside Danburg, Georgia. Built in 1857, it is closely associated with two other homes, the Chennault House (completed 1858) and the Anderson House (completed 1870) all believed to have been constructed by John Cunningham. They were built in the Greek Revival architecture style. The homes are within several miles of each other and close to the ghost town of Petersburg, Georgia which was a commercial hub. It was added to the National Register of Historic Places on October 14, 1976. It is located north of Danburg off Georgia State Route 79 on SR 1445 (Delhi Road).

== See also ==
- National Register of Historic Places listings in Wilkes County, Georgia
