= Lincolnton Historic District =

Historic district in Georgia, United States

- U.S. National Register of Historic Places
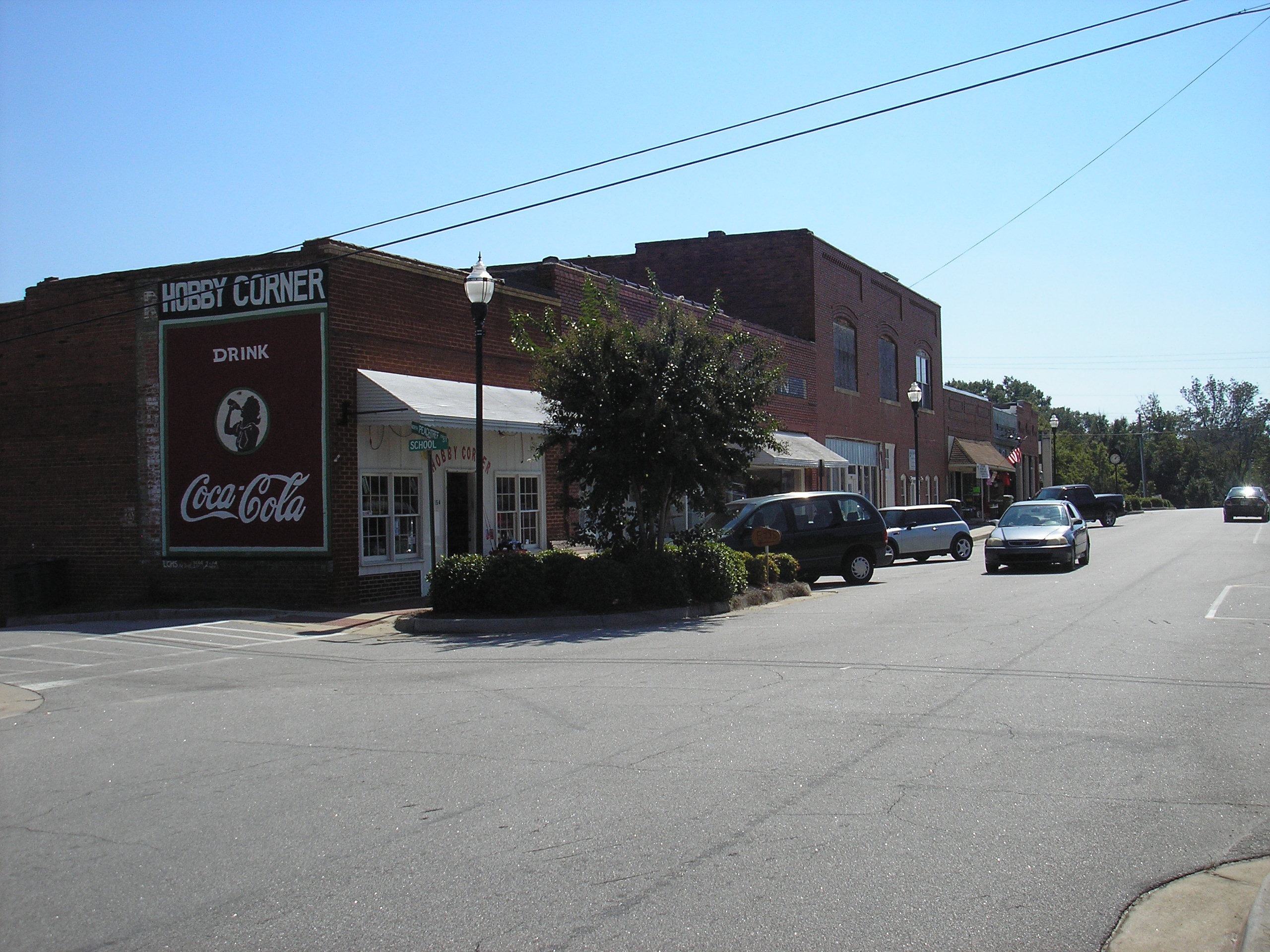

- Location within Georgia
- Location: Roughly, along Washington, Peachtree, Goshen and Elm Sts., Lincolnton, Georgia
- Coordinates: 33°47′29″N 82°28′38″W
- Area: 280 acres (1.1 km^{2})
- Built: 1796
- Architect: G.L. Preacher
- Architectural style: Bungalow/craftsman, Moderne, Queen Anne
- MPS: Lincoln County MPS
- NRHP reference No.: 93000932
- Added to NRHP: September 21, 1993

The Lincolnton Historic District, in Lincolnton, Georgia, is a historic district which was listed on the National Register of Historic Places in 1993. It included 126 contributing buildings, a contributing structure, a contributing site, and a contributing object.

The district runs roughly along Washington, Peachtree, Goshen and Elm Streets in Lincolnton, and covers an area of 280 acres (1.1 km^{2}). In addition to the contributing resources, it also includes 46 non-contributing buildings.

It includes:

- the Lincoln County Courthouse, separately listed on the National Register, designed by G.L. Preacher
- Lincolnton Presbyterian Church and Cemetery, separately listed. This was once the "Union Church, was built in 1823 to serve as a meeting house for several different denominations, thus its name Union Church; such churches were a common phenomenon in early settlements but not many of these have survived. It is a simple gable front church with a cemetery that also dates back to the early 19th century."
- Lamar-Blanchard House (1823), separately listed
- Blanchard Hotel (1941)
- a Sears, Roebuck and Company mail-order house, built in 1911 on Humphrey St. This is model "Modern Home No. 124", a "one-story Georgian Cottage with a full-facade, integral porch supported by oversized Ionic columns and exaggerated brackets giving it an unusual Neoclassical/Craftsman style appearance".

It includes Bungalow/craftsman, Moderne, and Queen Anne architecture.

== Gallery ==
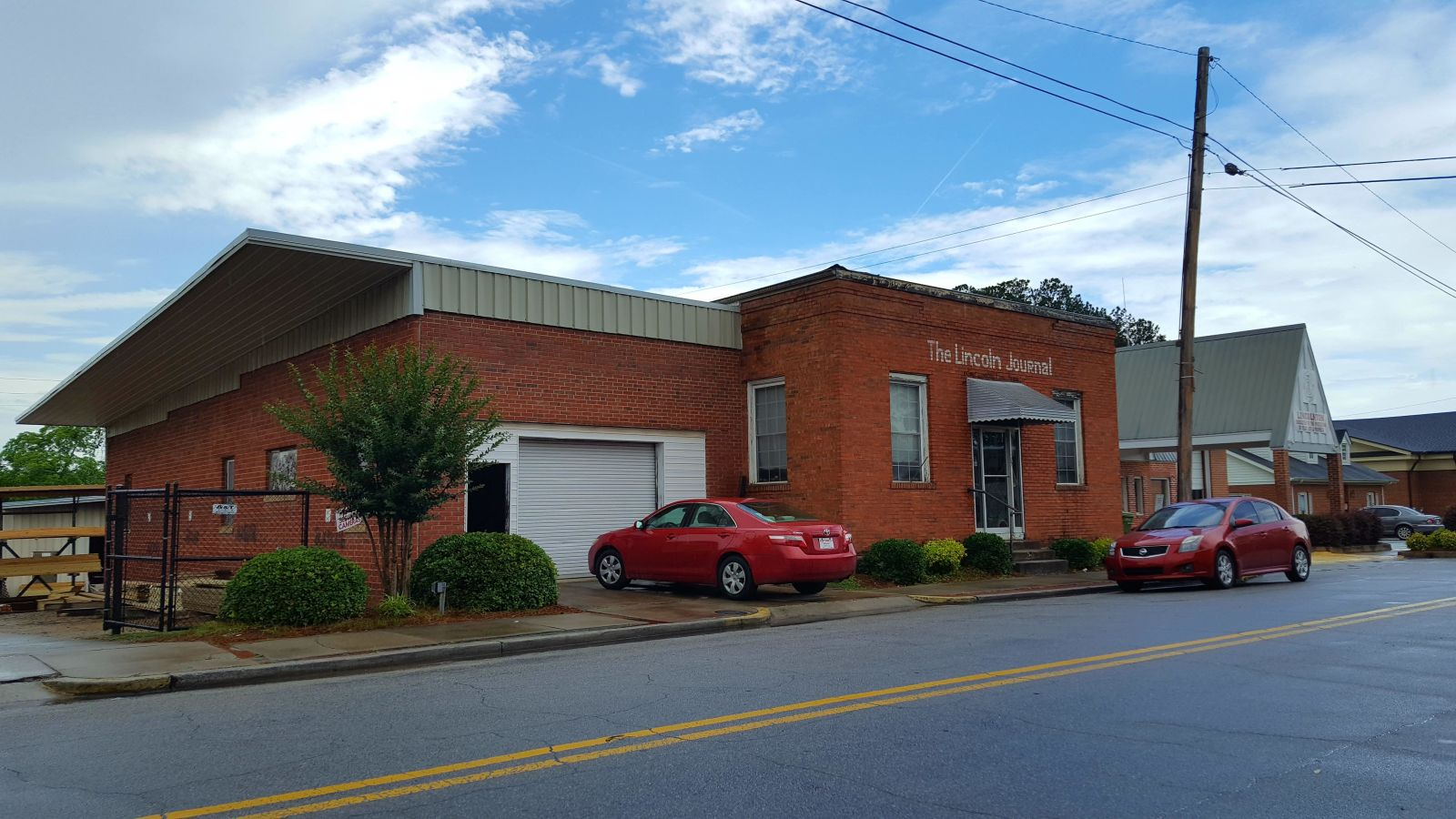
The Lincoln Journal

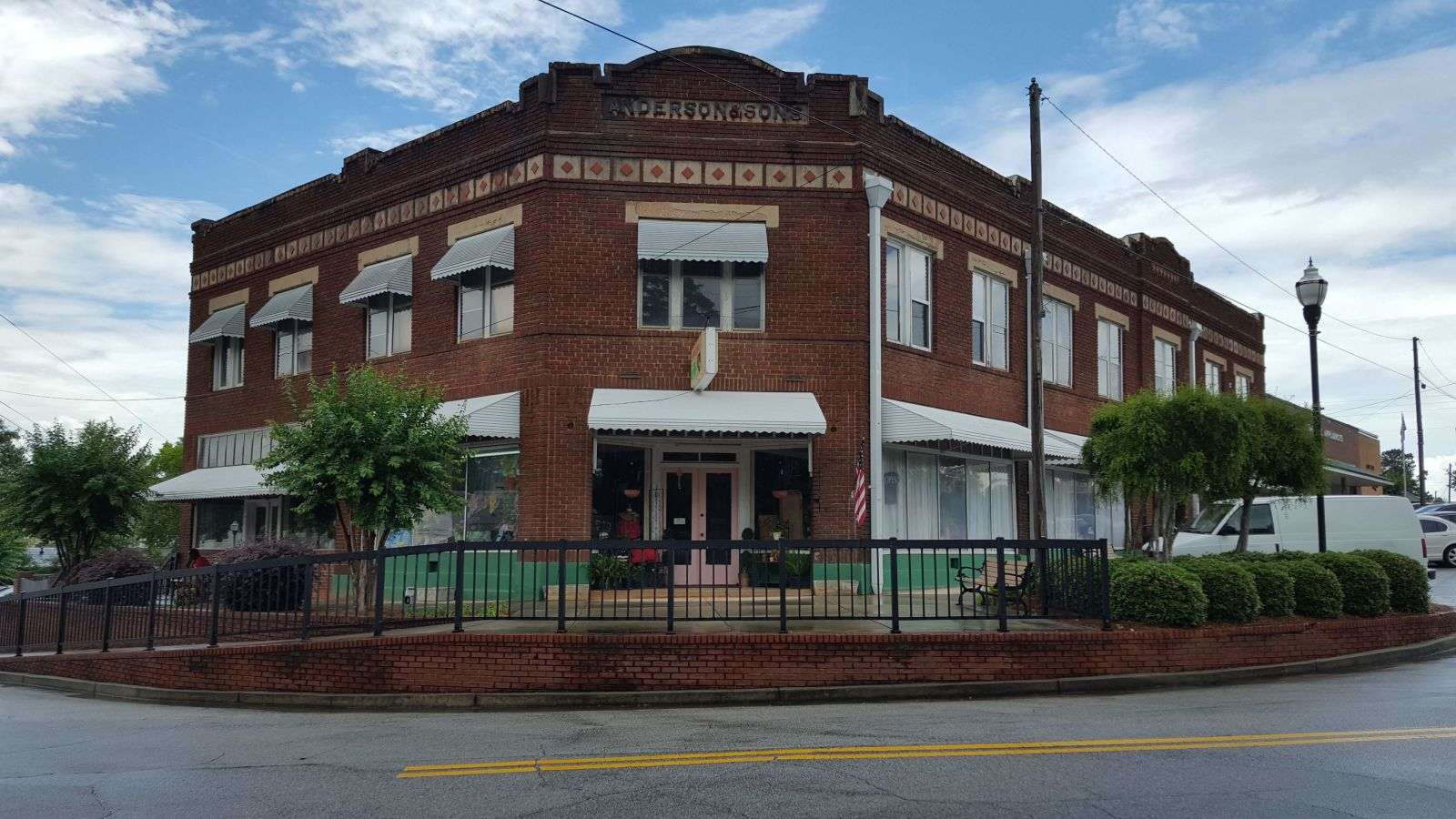
The Lincoln Journal

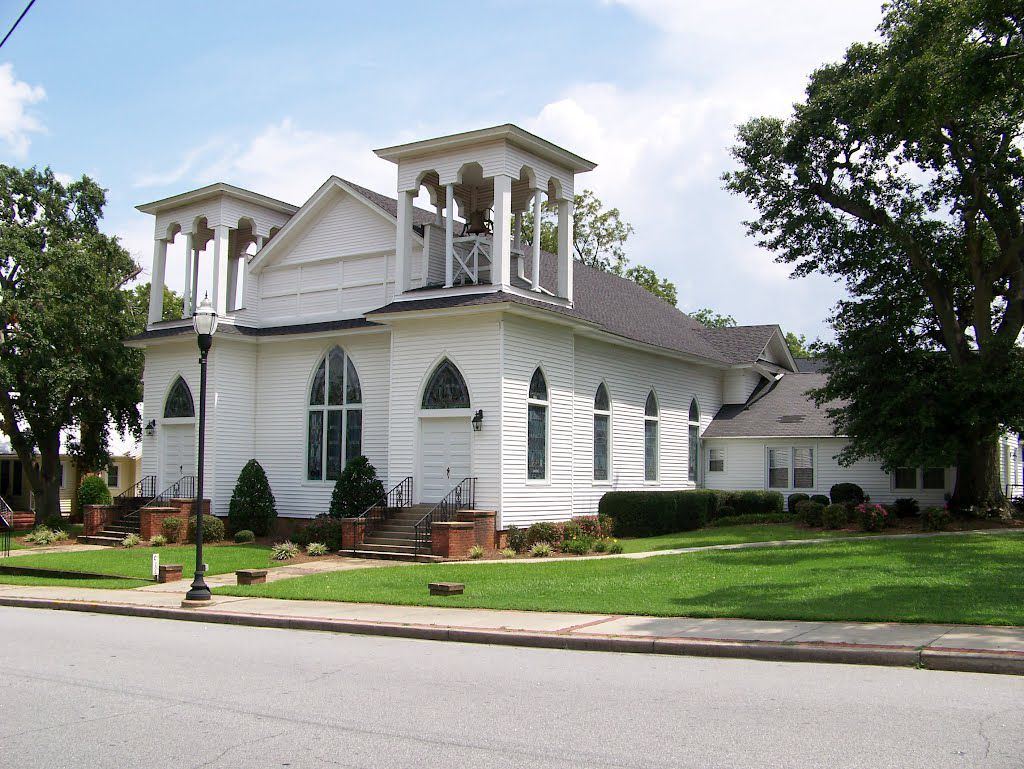
Lincolnton United Methodist Church
