= Georgia State Route 220 =

State highway in Lincoln County, Georgia

State Route 220
- Georgia State Route 220 highlighted in red

Route information
- Maintained by GDOT
- Length: 18.8 mi (30.3 km)

Major junctions
- Southwest end: US 378 / SR 47 southwest of Lincolnton
- SR 43 south of Lincolnton; SR 47 southeast of Lincolnton
- Northeast end: US 378 / SR 43 northeast of Lincolnton

Location
- Country: United States
- State: Georgia
- Counties: Lincoln

Highway system
- Georgia State Highway System; Interstate; US; State; Special
← SR 219	→ US 221

State Route 220 (SR 220) is a 18.8-mile-long (30.3 km) state highway that runs southwest-to-northeast in a semicircle completely within Lincoln county in the east-central part of the U.S. state of Georgia.

== Route description ==
SR 220 begins at an intersection with US 378/SR 47 (Double Branches Road) southwest of Lincolnton. It heads southeast to an intersection with SR 43 (Thomson Highway), which is located south of Lincolnton. The highway travels northeast until it reaches a second intersection with SR 47 (Augusta Highway, located southeast of Lincolnton). It leads to J. Strom Thurmond Reservoir. SR 220 continue to the northeast and turns to the north-northeast, crosses Strom Thurmond Lake, and then meets its northeastern terminus, an intersection with US 378/SR 43 (Coach Jimmy Smith Highway).

== Major intersections ==
The entire route is in Lincoln County.

Location	mi	km	Destinations	Notes
	0.0	0.0	US 378 / SR 47 (Double Branches Road) – Washington, Lincolnton	Southwestern terminus
	3.2	5.1	SR 43 (Thomson Highway) – Thomson, Lincolnton	
	10.2	16.4	SR 47 (Augusta Highway) – Evans, Lincolnton	
	17.4	28.0	Lake Strom Thurmond	
	18.8	30.3	US 378 / SR 43 (Coach Jimmy Smith Highway) – Lincolnton, McCormick	Northeastern terminus
1.000 mi = 1.609 km; 1.000 km = 0.621 mi

== Spur Route ==
State Route 220 Spur
- Location: Double Branches
- Length: 5.1 mi (8.2 km)
- Existed: 1940–1997

State Route 220 Spur (SR 220 Spur) was a 5.1 mile (8.2 km) spur route of SR 220 that served the unincorporated community of Double Branches. It was decommissioned in 1997, and it is now known as Double Branches Road.

The entire route is in Lincoln County.

Location	mi	km	Destinations	Notes
Kenna	0.0	0.0	SR 220 (Double Branches Rd) to SR 47 – Woodlawn, Washington, Kenna	Western terminus of SR 220 Spur
Double Branches	2.8	4.5	Reese Price Road	
Bussey Point	5.1	8.2	Indian Cove Road	Eastern terminus; roadway continues as a dirt road toward Bussey Point on Lake Thurmond
1.000 mi = 1.609 km; 1.000 km = 0.621 mi
