= Jarius Wynn =

American football player (born 1986)

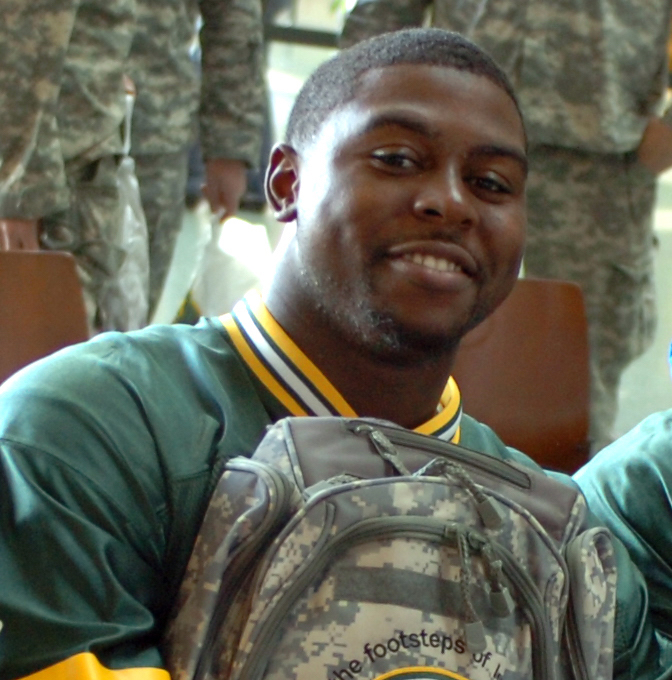
- Wynn with the Green Bay Packers in 2009

No. 79, 92, 94, 99
- Position: Defensive end

Personal information
- Born: August 29, 1986 (age 40); Augusta, Georgia, U.S.
- Listed height: 6 ft 3 in (1.91 m)
- Listed weight: 285 lb (129 kg)

Career information
- High school: Lincoln County (Lincolnton, Georgia)
- College: Georgia
- NFL draft: 2009: 6th round, 182nd overall pick

Career history
- Green Bay Packers (2009–2011); Tennessee Titans (2012); San Diego Chargers (2013); Dallas Cowboys (2013); Buffalo Bills (2014–2015)

Awards and highlights
- Super Bowl champion (XLV)

Career NFL statistics
- Total tackles: 63
- Sacks: 11.0
- Fumble recoveries: 1
- Stats at Pro Football Reference

Jarius Jessereel Wynn (born August 29, 1986) is an American former professional American football player who was a defensive end in the National Football League (NFL). He was selected by the Green Bay Packers in the sixth round of the 2009 NFL draft and won a Super Bowl ring in Super Bowl XLV over the Pittsburgh Steelers. He played college football at Georgia.

Wynn also played for the Tennessee Titans, San Diego Chargers. Dallas Cowboys and Buffalo Bills.

== Early life ==
Wynn attended Lincoln County High School and was First-team GHSA All-State Class-A as a senior defensive lineman in 2004. He earned First-team All-State honors as an offensive lineman in 2003.

== College career ==
Wynn attended Georgia Military College and was Second-team National Junior College Athletic Association (NJCAA) All-American honors following the 2006 campaign as well as team captain and defensive MVP. He tallied 21 tackles, including a team-leading eight for losses, two sacks, forced four fumbles and had one fumble recovery in 2006. Wynn was rated the No. 1 junior college defensive tackle prospect in the nation for the class of 2007 by JCGridiron.com.

After enrolling at Georgia in January 2007, he appeared in 13 games the following season. He had 9 tackles, 1 for a loss and a sack. In 2008, Wynn appeared in 13 games, making twelve starts, recording 24 tackles, 4 for a loss, 3 sacks and six quarterback hurries.

== Professional career ==
Pre-draft measurables
Height	Weight	Arm length	Hand span	40-yard dash	10-yard split	20-yard split	20-yard shuttle	Three-cone drill	Vertical jump	Broad jump	Bench press
6 ft 2 5/8 in (1.90 m)	275 lb (125 kg)	34 1/2 in (0.88 m)	11 in (0.28 m)	5.08 s	1.81 s	2.96 s	4.58 s	7.40 s	31 1/2 in (0.80 m)	8 ft 11 in (2.72 m)	19 reps
Arm and hand spans from Pro Day, all other values from NFL Combine.

=== Green Bay Packers ===
Wynn was selected by the Green Bay packers in the sixth round (182nd overall) of the 2009 NFL draft.

During the 2010 preseason, Wynn was released during the routine cuts that are mandated by the NFL for the 53-man roster. He tried out for the Seattle Seahawks but wasn't signed. It wasn't long before Green Bay Packer defensive end Justin Harrell was injured during the Packers' season opener against the Philadelphia Eagles, placing him on the injured reserve list for the remainder of the season and causing the Packers to re-sign Wynn on September 14, 2010.

On August 27, 2012, the Packers released him in order to meet roster limit requirements.

=== Tennessee Titans ===
Wynn signed as a free agent with the Tennessee Titans on November 7, 2012.

=== San Diego Chargers ===
Wynn signed with the San Diego Chargers on April 3, 2013. He posted 3 tackles and one sack in 5 games, before being released on October 8.

=== Dallas Cowboys ===
Wynn was signed by the Dallas Cowboys on October 15, 2013 due to injuries to the team's defensive line. He played mostly as a backup (one start at defensive tackle), finishing with 12 tackles (3 for loss), one sack, 6 quarterback pressures and 2 passes defensed.

=== Buffalo Bills ===
Wynn signed with the Buffalo Bills as a free agent on April 8, 2014. After registering 18 quarterback pressures, 2 sacks and 2 passes defensed, he was re-signed to a two-year, $2.2 million contract on March 12, 2015. Wynn suffered a torn ACL in the first 2015 preseason game against the Carolina Panthers and was placed on the injured reserve list.

Wynn was released by the Buffalo Bills on May 2, 2016. He later announced his retirement from professional football in 2017.

== Personal life ==
Wynn's wife Martavia gave birth to Jaruis's second son, Jarius Jr., on the morning of Super Bowl XLV. He also has another son, Jeremiah, and a daughter Jasiah.

Wynn is the cousin of former NFL running back Garrison Hearst.
