= Amity School =

- U.S. National Register of Historic Places
- Location within Georgia Location within the United States
- Nearest city: Lincolnton, Georgia
- Coordinates: 33°40′35″N 82°29′47″W
- Area: 4 acres (1.6 ha)
- Built: 1902-04
- MPS: Lincoln County MPS
- NRHP reference No.: 93000933
- Added to NRHP: September 21, 1993

The Amity School in Lincolnton, Georgia, United States is a historic school built during 1902–04. It was also used as a meeting hall. It was added to the National Register of Historic Places in 1993. It is located at Clay Hill Road west of the junction with GA 43.

It is a large two-story frame building that is approximately 54 feet (16 m) by 32 feet (9.8 m) in size. It has a steep hipped roof and a full-width one-story porch, with a bell tower protruding from the front slope of the roof.

== See also ==
- National Register of Historic Places listings in Lincoln County, Georgia
