= Anderson House (Danburg, Georgia) =

Historic house in Georgia, United States

- U.S. National Register of Historic Places
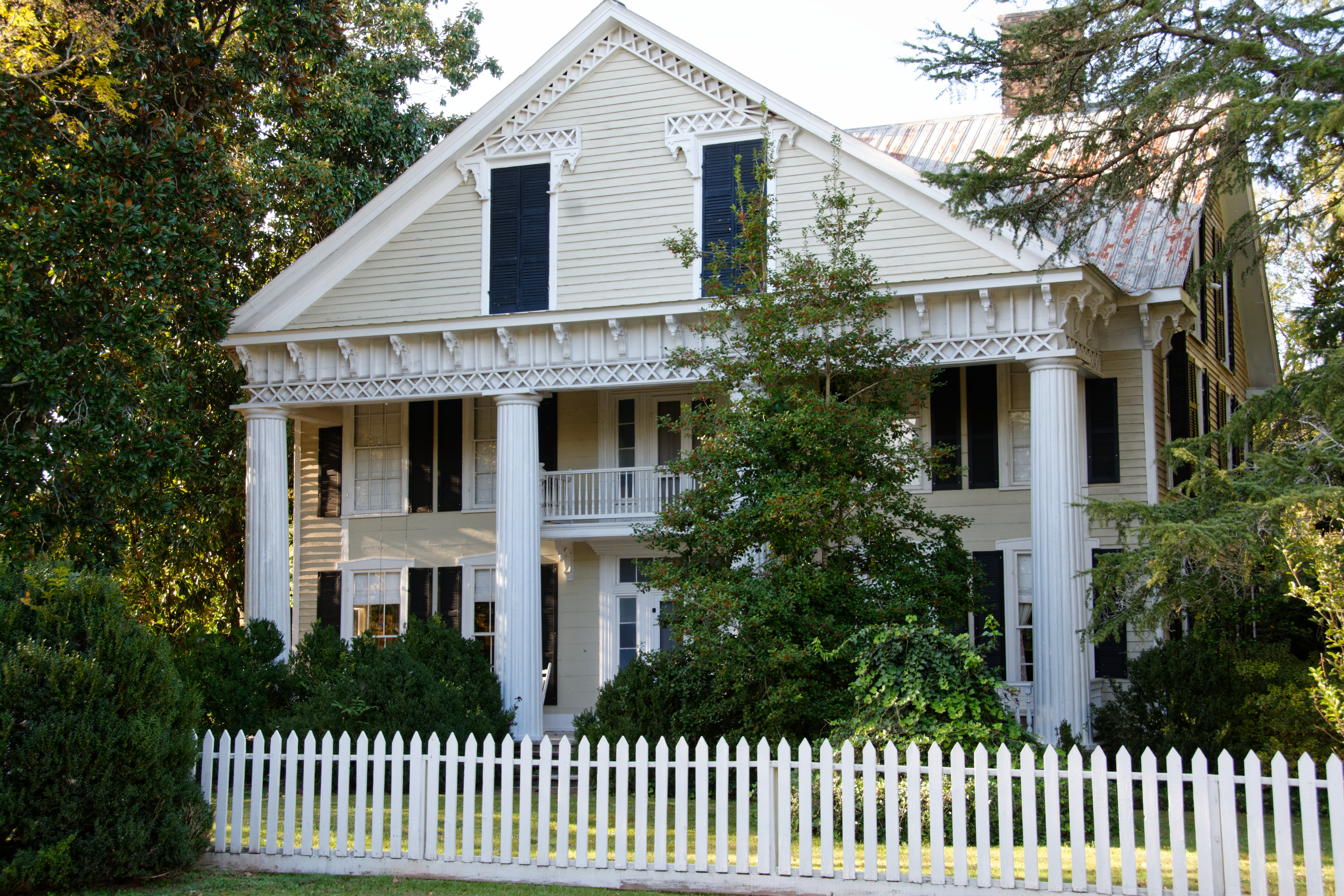
- The house in 2020

- Location within Georgia Location within the United States
- Location: GA 44, Danburg, Georgia
- Coordinates: 33.868°N 82.6527°W
- Area: 6 acres (2.4 ha)
- Built: 1865
- Architectural style: Greek Revival, Romanesque, Victorian
- NRHP reference No.: 76000657
- Added to NRHP: September 29, 1976

Anderson House is a historic building located on Georgia Route 44 in Danburg, Georgia, United States and was listed on the National Register of Historic Places in 1976.

The Greek Revival home probably incorporates an earlier structure built in the 1790s and may have been built by Dr. W.D. Quinn. John Anderson built the home as it now stands. The columns were made in Savannah and the mirrors and cornices were made in England. Fine furniture and imported curtains came from New York City and Chicago. The 24-foot by 35-foot banquet room and the old stone kitchen were located in a separate building connected to the main home by a breezeway.

The last Anderson to live in the home was Miss Pink Anderson. This was during the Great Depression and there was no money to maintain the home. The formal gardens and fountain were long gone and vines and undergrowth had taken over. The home sat empty for many years until it was purchased in 1962 by Ernest Walker who painted and remodeled the home. The roof of the old kitchen and dining room had fallen in, with only the 16-18" walls standing, and was demolished. Richard Simms, who bought the home in 1972, added a welcoming porch in the back. They also added a picket fence where an original black iron fence had once been. The home is currently owned by Vinnie and Roderick Dowling. The front porch with its columns faced the formal gardens, fountains, and holly trees. It also had a greenhouse, brick walkways, and a gazebo.

A relative of Ernest Walker stated that when Walker purchased the Anderson House there were two slave cabins still intact directly behind the main house and that the cabins had sleeping lofts and were very spartan inside. They were made of pine. A canning shed was located directly west of the house, built in the style of the main house and somewhat ornate in decoration. In the attic of the main house, there were old trunks filled with "day ledgers" from the store that served the community and the plantation dating to the late 1800s. Also in the attic were old dressmaker's forms and an assortment of old clothes.

The home is related to the Willis-Sale-Stennett House (1857) and the Chennault House (completed 1858).

== See also ==
- National Register of Historic Places listings in Wilkes County, Georgia
