= Lincolnton =

Lincolnton may refer to:

- Lincolnton, North Carolina
- Lincolnton, Georgia
