= Lincoln School District =

Lincoln School District may refer to:

- Lincoln Consolidated School District (Arkansas) (formerly just "Lincoln School District")
- Lincoln Unified School District, California
- Lincoln Unified School District 298, Kansas
- Lincoln Consolidated School District (Michigan)
- Lincoln Public Schools, Nebraska
- Lincoln County School District (disambiguation)
