= Georgia State Route 43 =

State highway in Georgia

State Route 43
- SR 43; mainline in red, connector in blue

Route information
- Maintained by GDOT
- Length: 25.7 mi (41.4 km)
- Existed: 1941–present

Major junctions
- South end: US 78 / SR 10 / SR 17 north of Thomson
- US 378 / SR 47 / SR 79 in Lincolnton
- North end: US 378 at the South Carolina state line southwest of McCormick, SC

Location
- Country: United States
- State: Georgia
- Counties: McDuffie, Lincoln

Highway system
- Georgia State Highway System; Interstate; US; State; Special
← SR 42A	→ SR 44

State Route 43 (SR 43) is a 25.7-mile-long (41.4 km) state highway that travels southwest-to-northeast through portions of McDuffie and Lincoln counties in the east-central part of the U.S. state of Georgia. The highway connects the northern part of the Thomson area to the South Carolina state line, via Lincolnton.

== Route description ==
SR 43 beings at an intersection with US 78/SR 10/SR 17 (Washington Road) north of Thomson in McDuffie County. It heads north-northeast, crossing over the Little River on the Raysville Bridge. On this bridge, it crosses into Lincoln County just east of the meeting point of McDuffie, Wilkes, and Lincoln counties. It continues to the north-northeast, and intersects SR 220 in the southern portion of the county, just south-southwest of Loco. It continues its routing and curves to the northwest into Lincolnton. In the city, SR 43 intersects SR 47 (Elm Avenue). The two highways travel concurrently for about 600 feet (180 m) to the west. Farther to the west, they meet US 378. At this intersection, SR 43 and SR 47 diverge; SR 43 travels concurrently with US 378 eastbound, and SR 47 travels concurrently with US 378 westbound. US 378/SR 43 remain concurrent to the South Carolina state line, where SR 43 meets its northern terminus and US 378 continues to McCormick, South Carolina.

== History ==
The highway that would eventually become SR 43 was established between 1930 and 1932 as SR 70 from Lincolnton to the South Carolina state line. At this time, the highway was under construction. In early 1934, SR 70 was extended south-southwest to US 78/SR 10/SR 17 north-northwest of Thomson. By the end of 1937, the segment of SR 70 from Lincolnton to the South Carolina state line had a "sand clay or top soil" surface. In 1938, a small portion of the highway southwest of Lincolnton had a "completed hard surface". Late in 1941, all of SR 70 was redesignated as SR 43. The next year, the segment northeast of Lincolnton had a completed hard surface. Between 1946 and 1948, the segment from the southern terminus to a point southwest of Lincolnton had a "sand clay, top soil, or stabilized earth" surface. About five years later, the segment southwest of Lincolnton was shifted eastward. The highway now entered Lincolnton from the south, as it does today. The old path was redesignated as part of SR 220. The new path of the highway, from the Little River crossing to Lincolnton was hard surfaced. The next year, the segment from the southern terminus to the Little River crossing was hard surfaced.

== Major intersections ==
County	Location	mi	km	Destinations	Notes
McDuffie		0.0	0.0	US 78 / SR 10 / SR 17 (Washington Road)	Southern terminus
Little River		7.4	11.9	Raysville Bridge; McDuffie–Lincoln county line	
Lincoln		12.8	20.6	SR 220 – Washington, Woodlawn	
Lincoln	Lincolnton	18.2	29.3	SR 47 south (Elm Street) / South Peachtree Street north – Augusta	Southern end of SR 47 concurrency; southern terminus of South Peachtree Street
Lincoln	Lincolnton	18.4	29.6	US 378 west / SR 47 north (South Washington Street) / Elam Avenue west	Northern end of SR 47 concurrency; southern end of US 378 concurrency; eastern terminus of Elam Avenue
Lincoln	Lincolnton	19.5	31.4	SR 79 north (Goshen Street) – Elberton, Curry Colvin Recreational Complex	Southern terminus of SR 79
Lincoln	Wright's Crossing	19.6	31.5	SR 43 Conn. east – Appling, Augusta, Lincoln County Business Park	Western terminus of SR 43 Conn.
Lincoln		22.9	36.9	Clarks Hill Lake	
Lincoln		24.3	39.1	SR 220 south – Kenna	Northern terminus of SR 220
Lincoln		25.7	41.4	US 378 east – McCormick	Continuation beyond South Carolina state line at the Savannah River; northern end of US 378 concurrency
1.000 mi = 1.609 km; 1.000 km = 0.621 mi: Concurrency terminus

== Special routes ==
=== Lincolnton bypass route ===
State Route 43 Bypass
- Location: Lincolnton
- Existed: 1970–2015

State Route 43 Bypass (SR 43 Byp.) was a bypass route of SR 43 in the city of Lincolnton. It started at an intersection with SR 43 and SR 47. It curved to the north-northwest and reached its northern terminus, an intersection with US 378/SR 43.

Between 1963 and 1966, SR 43 Spur was designated on this same path. In 1970, SR 43 Spur was redesignated as SR 43 Byp. In 2015, SR 43 Byp. was decommissioned.

=== Lincolnton connector route ===
State Route 43 Connector
- Location: Lincolnton
- Length: 1.9 mi (3.1 km)
- Existed: 1999–

State Route 43 Connector (SR 43 Conn.) is a 1.9-mile-long (3.1 km) connector route of SR 43 just to the east of the city limits of Lincolnton. It is known as Old Petersburg Road for its entire length. It begins at an intersection with SR 47 east of the city. It travels to the northwest and meets its northern terminus, an intersection with US 378/SR 43 northeast of the city, in a place known as Wright's Crossing. It was built in 1999.

The entire route is in Lincoln County.

Location	mi	km	Destinations	Notes
	0.0	0.0	SR 47 (Augusta Highway) – Appling, Augusta, Lincolnton	Southern terminus
Wright's Crossing	1.9	3.1	US 378 / SR 43 – Lincolnton, McCormick S.C., Elijah Clark State Park	Northern terminus
1.000 mi = 1.609 km; 1.000 km = 0.621 mi

=== Lincolnton spur route ===
State Route 43 Spur
- Location: Lincolnton
- Existed: 1966–1970

State Route 43 Spur (SR 43 Spur) was a spur route of SR 43 that existed in Lincolnton. Between 1963 and 1966, SR 43 Spur was established from an intersection with SR 43 and SR 47 and curved to the north-northwest. It then met its northern terminus, an intersection with US 378/SR 43. In 1970, it was redesignated as SR 43 Byp.
