= Goshen, Georgia =

Unincorporated community in Georgia, U.S.

Coordinates: 33°51′49″N 82°30′28″W

Goshen is an unincorporated community in Lincoln County, in the U.S. state of Georgia.

== History ==
A post office called Goshen was established in 1808, and remained in operation until 1903. The community derives its name from the Land of Goshen.
