= Double Branches, Georgia =

Unincorporated community in Georgia, U.S.

Coordinates: 33°45′07″N 82°19′58″W

Double Branches is an unincorporated community in Lincoln County, in the U.S. state of Georgia.

== History ==
A post office called Double Branches was established in 1823, and remained in operation until 1926. The community's name is locational, after two streams near the original town site.
