= Georgia State Route 79 =

State highway in Georgia, United States

State Route 79
- Elberton-Lincolnton Highway
- SR 79 highlighted in red

Route information
- Maintained by GDOT
- Length: 26.5 mi (42.6 km)

Major junctions
- South end: US 378 / SR 43 in Lincolnton
- SR 44 in Chennault
- North end: SR 72 southeast of Elberton

Location
- Country: United States
- State: Georgia
- Counties: Lincoln, Elbert

Highway system
- Georgia State Highway System; Interstate; US; State; Special
← SR 78	→ US 80

State Route 79 (SR 79) is a 26.5-mile-long (42.6 km) state highway in the east-central part of the U.S. state of Georgia. The highway travels from US 378/SR 43 in Lincolnton northwest to SR 72 at a point southeast of Elberton.

== Route description ==
SR 79 begins at an intersection with US 378/SR 43 (McCormick Highway) northeast of Lincolnton approximately 450 feet west of the intersection of US 378/SR 43 and SR 43 Conn, within the central part of Lincoln County. The road is known as New Petersburg Road. The highway travels to the north-northwest. It comes to a T intersection with the Elberton Hwy and turns to the right to go north, whereas turning to the left follows the highway's old alignment into Lincolnton. It curves back to the north-northwest and crosses over Soap Creek. During a northwestern direction of the highway, it travels through Goshen and crosses over Murry Creek. After curving back to the north-northwest, it crosses over Mill Creek. It curves to the southwest then resumes its generally north-northwest direction. It curves to the west-southwest and crosses over Fishing Creek. It bends to the northwest and enters Chennault. Here, the highway intersects the northern terminus of SR 44 and the southern terminus of Graball Road. A brief distance later, it crosses over Newford Creek. It curves back to the north-northwest and briefly parallels the Lincoln–Wilkes county line. After crossing over Pistol Creek, it curves to the northeast. It curves back to the northwest and travels between two portions of Clarks Hill Lake, where it enters the southeastern part of Elbert County. The highway winds its way to the north-northwest to its northern terminus, an intersection with SR 72 (Calhoun Falls Highway) southeast of Elberton.

== Major intersections ==
County	Location	mi	km	Destinations	Notes
Lincoln	Lincolnton	0.0	0.0	US 378 / SR 43 (McCormick Highway) – Thomson, Washington, McCormick SC, Elijah Clark State Park	Southern terminus
Lincoln	Chennault	12.3	19.8	SR 44 south / Graball Road north – Washington, Graball	Northern terminus of SR 44; southern terminus of Graball Road
Elbert		26.5	42.6	SR 72 (Calhoun Falls Highway) – Elberton, Calhoun Falls, SC	Northern terminus; provides access to Elbert County Airport and Elbert Memorial Hospital
1.000 mi = 1.609 km; 1.000 km = 0.621 mi
