= Chennault, Georgia =

Unincorporated community in Georgia, U.S.

Chennault is an unincorporated community in Lincoln County, Georgia, United States.

Chennault, Georgia lies at the intersection of State Routes 44 and 79, to the northwest of the city of Lincolnton, the county seat of Lincoln County. Its elevation is 466 feet (142 m), and it is located at 33°54′27″N 82°36′07″W (33.9076218, -82.6020786).

Chennault is approximately 5 miles from the border of South Carolina.

== See also ==
- Central Savannah River Area
