= Lincoln County School District (Georgia) =

School district in Georgia (U.S. state)

Address
- 423 Metasville Road Lincolnton, Georgia, 30817-3444; United States
- Coordinates: 33.817242°N 82.538701°W

District information
- Grades: Pre-school - 12
- Superintendent: Randall Edmunds
- Accreditation(s): Southern Association of Colleges and Schools; Georgia Accrediting Commission

Students and staff
- Enrollment: 1,450
- Faculty: 98

Other information
- Telephone: (706) 359-3742
- Fax: (706) 359-7938
- Website: www.lincolncountyschools.org

The Lincoln County School District is a public school district in Lincoln County, Georgia, United States, based in Lincolnton. It serves the communities of Chennault and Lincolnton.

== Schools ==
The Lincoln County School District has one elementary school, one middle school, and one high school.

=== Elementary school ===
- Lincoln County Elementary School

=== Middle school ===
- Lincoln County Middle School

=== High school ===
- Lincoln County High School
