= Lincolnton Presbyterian Church and Cemetery =

Historic site in Lincoln County, Georgia, US

- U.S. National Register of Historic Places
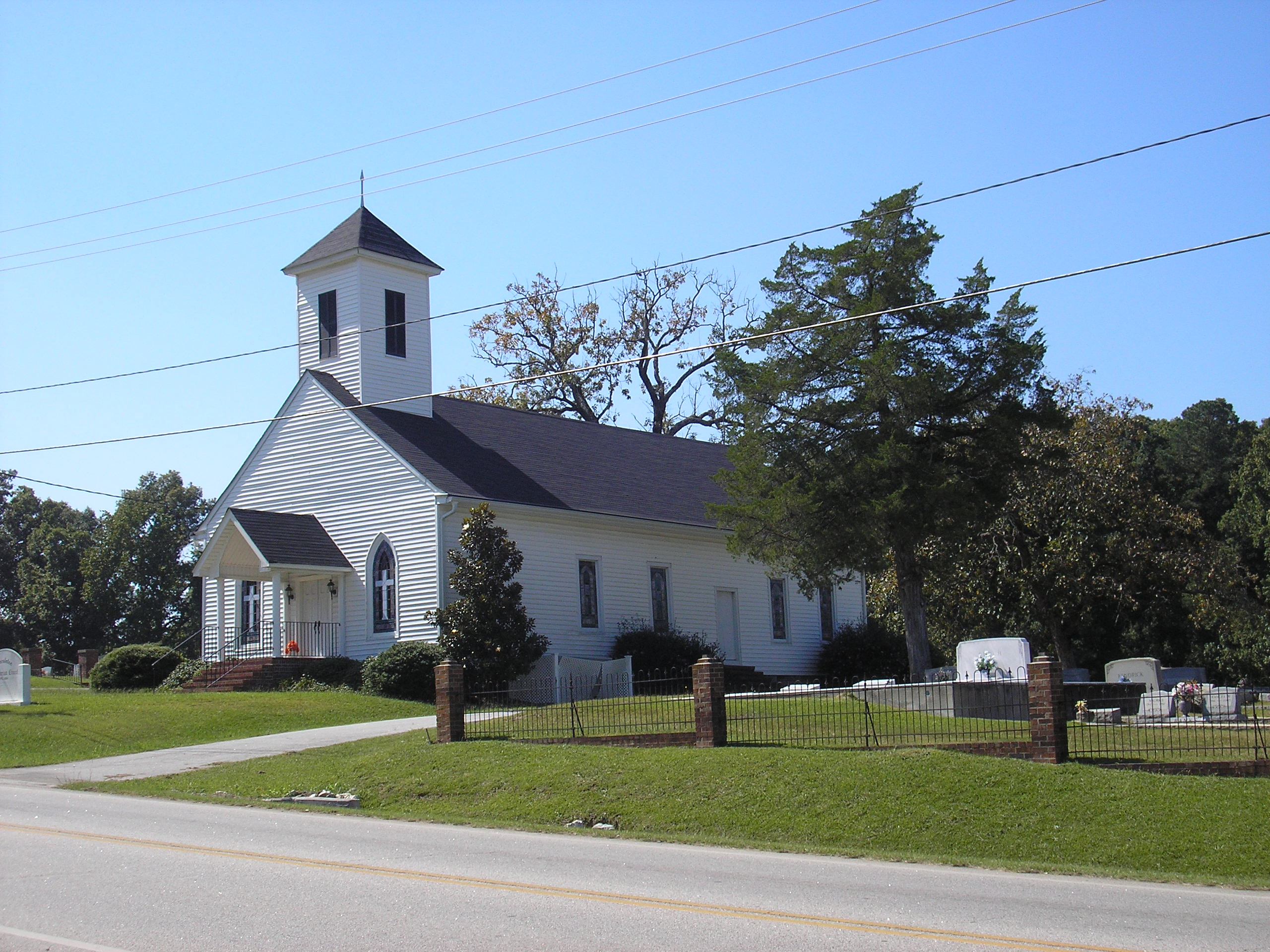

- Location within Georgia Location within the United States
- Location: N. Washington St., Lincolnton, Georgia
- Coordinates: 33°47′25″N 82°28′50″W
- Area: 3 acres (1.2 ha)
- Built: c.1823
- NRHP reference No.: 82002451
- Added to NRHP: August 26, 1982

Lincolnton Presbyterian Church and Cemetery is a historic Presbyterian church and its cemetery on N. Washington Street in Lincolnton, Georgia, in Lincoln County, Georgia. The property was added to the National Register in 1982.

The church building was built in c.1823 and was known as Union Presbyterian Church. It served Methodist and Baptist congregations in addition to Presbyterians until the other churches could build separately. The oldest marked grave in the cemetery is from 1834.
