= Matthews House (Danburg, Georgia) =

Historic house in Georgia, United States

- U.S. National Register of Historic Places
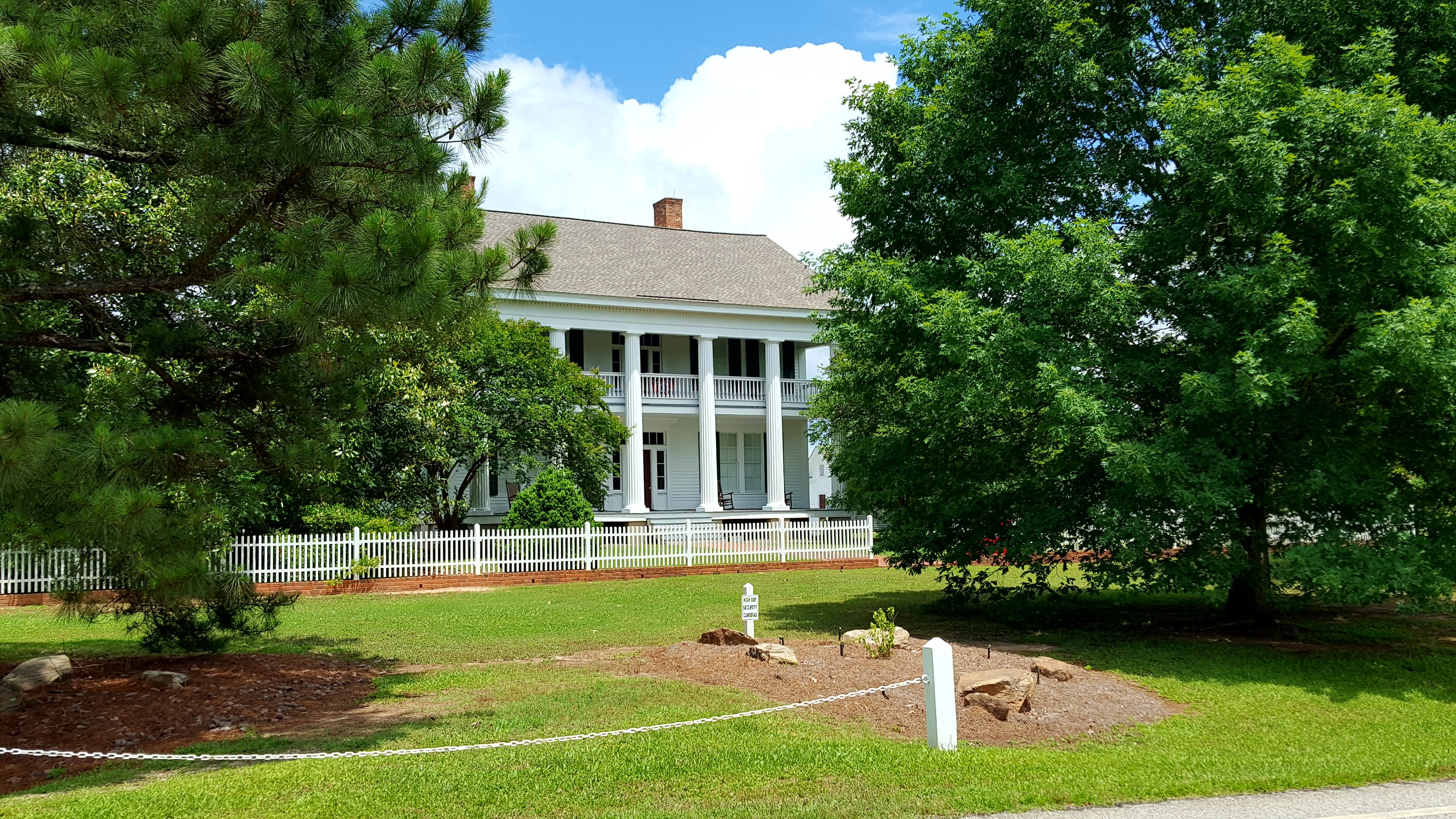

- Location within Georgia
- Location: On Georgia State Route 79 northeast of Danburg, Georgia
- Coordinates: 33°54′16″N 82°35′43″W
- Area: 48 acres (19 ha)
- Built: 1855
- Built by: Cunningham, John
- Architectural style: Gothic Revival
- NRHP reference No.: 76000641
- Added to NRHP: October 14, 1976

The Matthews House near Danburg, Georgia, located northeast on Georgia State Route 79, was built in 1855. It was listed on the National Register of Historic Places in 1976.

The listing included four contributing buildings.

It is a Gothic Revival-style frame building with a two-story five-bay portico supported by six fluted Doric columns.
