= Barney Bussey =

American football player (born 1962)

No. 8, 27
- Positions: Safety, linebacker

Personal information
- Born: May 20, 1962 (age 64); Lincolnton, Georgia, U.S.
- Listed height: 6 ft 0 in (1.83 m)
- Listed weight: 210 lb (95 kg)

Career information
- High school: Lincoln County (Lincolnton)
- College: South Carolina State
- NFL draft: 1984: 5th round, 119th overall pick

Career history
- Memphis Showboats (1984–1985); Cincinnati Bengals (1986–1992); Tampa Bay Buccaneers (1993–1995)

Career NFL statistics
- Tackles: 395
- Sacks: 13
- Interceptions: 10
- Stats at Pro Football Reference

Barney Bussey (born May 20, 1962) is an American former professional football player who was a safety in the National Football League (NFL). He played college football for the South Carolina State Bulldogs.

== Biography ==
Bussey was born in Lincolnton, Georgia. He attended high school at Lincoln County High School in Lincolnton where he was a major reason behind Lincoln County's defensive success in the late 1970s. Bussey played both offense and defense. In 1979, he was named to the Class AA All-State team. Bussey then attended South Carolina State University, where he became a Division I-AA All-American Defensive Back.

After college, Bussey was selected in the 1st round (8th overall) of the 1984 USFL draft by the Memphis Showboats in January 1984. Four months later he was selected in the 5th round (119th overall) in the 1984 NFL Draft. Bussey then signed with the USFL Showboats on May 8, 1984, and spent two seasons with Memphis. He was a key member of a defensive unit that featured future Hall of Fame DE Reggie White and led the club to the USFL Semi-Finals in 1985.

After the USFL folded in August 1986, he went on to play ten seasons with the Cincinnati Bengals and Tampa Bay Buccaneers in the National Football League.
