= Lincoln County School District =

Lincoln County School District, Lincoln County Schools, and variants are the names shared by several school districts in the United States:

- Lincoln County School District (Georgia)
- Lincoln County Schools (Kentucky)
- Lincoln County School District (Mississippi)
- Lincoln County School District (Missouri)
- Lincoln County School District (Nevada), school district in Nevada
- Lincoln County Schools (North Carolina)
- Lincoln County School District (Oregon)
- Lincoln County Schools (West Virginia), a school district in West Virginia
- Lincoln County School District Number 1, Wyoming
- Lincoln County School District Number 2, Wyoming
