= Garrison Hearst =

American football player (born 1971)

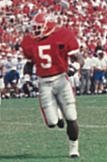
- Hearst with the Georgia Bulldogs in 1991

No. 23, 20
- Position: Running back

Personal information
- Born: January 4, 1971 (age 55); Lincolnton, Georgia, U.S.
- Listed height: 5 ft 11 in (1.80 m)
- Listed weight: 215 lb (98 kg)

Career information
- High school: Lincoln County (Lincolnton)
- College: Georgia (1990–1992)
- NFL draft: 1993: 1st round, 3rd overall pick

Career history
- Phoenix / Arizona Cardinals (1993–1995); Cincinnati Bengals (1996); San Francisco 49ers (1997–2003); Denver Broncos (2004)

Awards and highlights
- NFL Comeback Player of the Year (2001); 2× Pro Bowl (1998, 2001); George Halas Award (2002); Doak Walker Award (1992); Unanimous All-American (1992); SEC Player of the Year (1992); First-team All-SEC (1992); Second-team All-SEC (1991); SEC Offensive Freshman of the Year (1990); Citrus Bowl MVP (1993); Florida–Georgia Hall of Fame

Career NFL statistics
- Rushing yards: 7,966
- Rushing average: 4.4
- Rushing touchdowns: 30
- Receptions: 229
- Receiving yards: 2,065
- Receiving touchdowns: 9
- Stats at Pro Football Reference
- College Football Hall of Fame

Gerard Garrison Hearst (born January 4, 1971) is an American former professional football player who was a running back in the National Football League (NFL) for ten seasons. He played college football for the Georgia Bulldogs, and was recognized as a unanimous All-American. A first-round pick by the Arizona Cardinals, he also played professionally for the Cincinnati Bengals, San Francisco 49ers and Denver Broncos of the NFL. He ran for 1,000 yards or more in four different seasons. He was named the NFL Comeback Player of the Year in 2001.

In 1992, Hearst finished in third place in the Heisman Trophy voting after rushing for 1,547 yards and 19 touchdowns. When he left Georgia, he was the second-leading career rusher. Hearst was the number 3 overall pick in the 1993 NFL draft. He played 12 years for the NFL.

== Early life ==
Garrison Hearst was born in Lincolnton, Georgia. He attended Lincoln County High School in Lincolnton, where he was an all-state running back and broke several records.

== College career ==
Hearst attended the University of Georgia, and played for the Georgia Bulldogs football team from 1990 to 1992, leading the nation in touchdowns (21) and in scoring (11.5 points per game) in his junior year. During his career, he established new school and Southeastern Conference (SEC) records for points scored in a season (126), total touchdowns (21), rushing touchdowns (19), and average yards per carry (6.8)*. Hearst was a consensus All-America selection, the Doak Walker Award recipient, ESPN's ESPY Winner for Outstanding Collegiate Athlete and SEC Player of the year in 1992. He finished third in the Heisman Trophy voting.

Hearst finished his college career second on the Georgia records list in rushing yardage (3,232), all-purpose yardage (3,934), and 100-yard rushing games (16); trailing only Herschel Walker. He also finished third in career rushing touchdowns (33).

Regarded as an excellent prospect, he was taken in the 1993 NFL draft third overall by the Arizona Cardinals.

In 2022, it was announced that he was nominated for the 2023 College Hall of Fame ballot.

On January 14, 2026, Hearst was inducted into the College Football Hall of Fame.

== Professional career ==
Pre-draft measurables
Height	Weight	Arm length	Hand span
5 ft 9 in (1.75 m)	204 lb (93 kg)	31 1/8 in (0.79 m)	9 1/2 in (0.24 m)
All values from NFL Combine

=== Arizona Cardinals ===
Hearst was selected by the Phoenix Cardinals in the 1993 NFL draft. In Hearst's first two seasons with the Cardinals, he was used sparingly due to knee injuries. In 1995, he broke out as a pro player, rushing for 1,070 yards. This came with one touchdown and also 12 fumbles, the most for any non-quarterback. The Cardinals however felt it was needed to sign Simeon Rice to go with Leeland McElroy moving forward in the run game. As such, Hearst was cut by the Cardinals in the 1996 training camp.

=== Cincinnati Bengals ===
Hearst was then claimed off waivers by the Cincinnati Bengals. He played there one season, gaining 847 yards, but was then picked up by the San Francisco 49ers.

=== San Francisco 49ers ===
Hearst's best years came with the San Francisco 49ers. In his first year, 1997, he ran for 1,019 yards and four touchdowns, becoming the 49ers' first 1000-yard rusher since 1992 (Ricky Watters). The four touchdowns were more than he had scored in his entire pro career before 1997.

Hearst's true coming out, however, occurred in 1998. He ran for 1,570 yards and 7 touchdowns while averaging 5.1 yards per carry. His total rushing yards placed him third in the NFL, behind only Terrell Davis and Jamal Anderson. Hearst set a then franchise record for rushing yards in a season, breaking the former record held by Roger Craig (1,502 yards in 1988). The record held until 2006 (Frank Gore). His 535 receiving yards gave him a combined 2,105 yards on the season, another franchise record previously held by Craig (2,066 yards in 1985), also now held by Frank Gore (2,180 yards in 2006). Against the Detroit Lions late in the season, he set a then single-game franchise record of 198 rushing yards, which was later broken in 2000 by Charlie Garner. He also had the longest running play in the NFL earlier in the season, when he ran 96 yards for a game-winning touchdown in overtime on opening day versus the New York Jets. The play was later featured on NFL Films as one of the best two running plays in NFL history.

Following the great season by Hearst, he rushed for 128 yards and caught 3 passes for 15 in their wildcard win over the Green Bay Packers. The 49ers next faced the Atlanta Falcons in the Divisional Playoffs. On the first play from scrimmage, Hearst suffered a gruesome ankle break when his foot was caught in the Georgia Dome turf and twisted severely as he tried to spin away from Falcons' defensive end Chuck Smith. Doctors said he might not play again, even though the 49ers kept him on their roster as an inactive player.

Hearst ran into complications following surgery as circulatory problems choked off the blood supply in the area, leading to Avascular Necrosis, causing the talus bone in his foot to die. Bo Jackson suffered this same condition in his hip and was forced to retire from football.

After over two years of rehabilitation, Hearst played football in 2001 and became the first player in NFL history to come back to football after suffering avascular necrosis. He had an excellent season as well, rushing for 1,206 yards on a 4.8 average. The 49ers, who were 10–22 in 2 seasons without Hearst, went 12-4 that year. He won the NFL Comeback Player of the Year award.

Hearst remained with the 49ers for two more seasons, but was used less often, the focus of the 49ers' running game shifting to Kevan Barlow. Hearst still ran for 972 yards and 768 yards in 2002 and 2003, respectively.

Hearst was released during the 49ers' offseason after the 2003 season.

=== Denver Broncos ===
In March 2004, Hearst signed with the Denver Broncos. He was considered a "third down specialist" who had eight first downs, and 81 yards on 20 attempts with one touchdown (4.1 yards/carry) before being placed on IR with a broken hand, which was the end of his football career.

== Career statistics ==
=== NFL ===
Year	Team	GP	Rushing					Receiving				
Year	Team	GP	Att	Yds	Avg	Lng	TD	Rec	Yds	Avg	Lng	TD
1993	PHO	6	76	264	3.5	57	1	6	18	3.0	9	0
1994	ARI	8	37	169	4.6	36	1	6	49	8.2	29	0
1995	ARI	16	284	1,070	3.8	38	1	29	243	8.4	39	1
1996	CIN	16	225	847	3.8	24	0	12	131	10.9	40	1
1997	SF	13	234	1,019	4.4	51	4	21	194	9.2	69	2
1998	SF	16	310	1,570	5.1	96	7	39	535	13.7	81	2
1999	SF	0	Did not play due to injury									
2000	SF	0	Did not play due to injury									
2001	SF	16	252	1,206	4.8	43	4	41	347	8.5	60	1
2002	SF	16	215	972	4.5	40	8	48	317	6.6	16	1
2003	SF	12	178	768	4.3	36	3	25	211	8.4	26	1
2004	DEN	7	20	81	4.1	11	1	2	20	10.0	15	0
Total		126	1,831	7,966	4.4	96	30	229	2,065	9.0	81	

=== College ===
	Rushing					Receiving				
YEAR	ATT	YDS	AVG	LNG	TD	NO.	YDS	AVG	LNG	TD
1990	162	717	4.4	50	5	7	45	6.4	16	0
1991	153	968	6.3	69	9	16	177	11.0	24	0
1992	228	1,547	6.8	75	19	22	324	14.7	64	2
Totals	543	3,232	6.0	75	33	45	546	12.1	64	2

== Personal life ==
Hearst is married and has four children. He resides in Georgia.

== Gay slur controversy ==
In 2002, Hearst made inflammatory anti-gay comments to the Fresno Bee after Esera Tuaolo admitted he was gay. "Aww, hell no! I don't want any faggots on my team. I know this might not be what people want to hear, but that's a punk. I don't want any faggots in this locker room." Three weeks later, Hearst apologized for his comments.

== See also ==
- List of NCAA major college football yearly scoring leaders
