= Lincoln County, Georgia =

County in Georgia, United States

- County
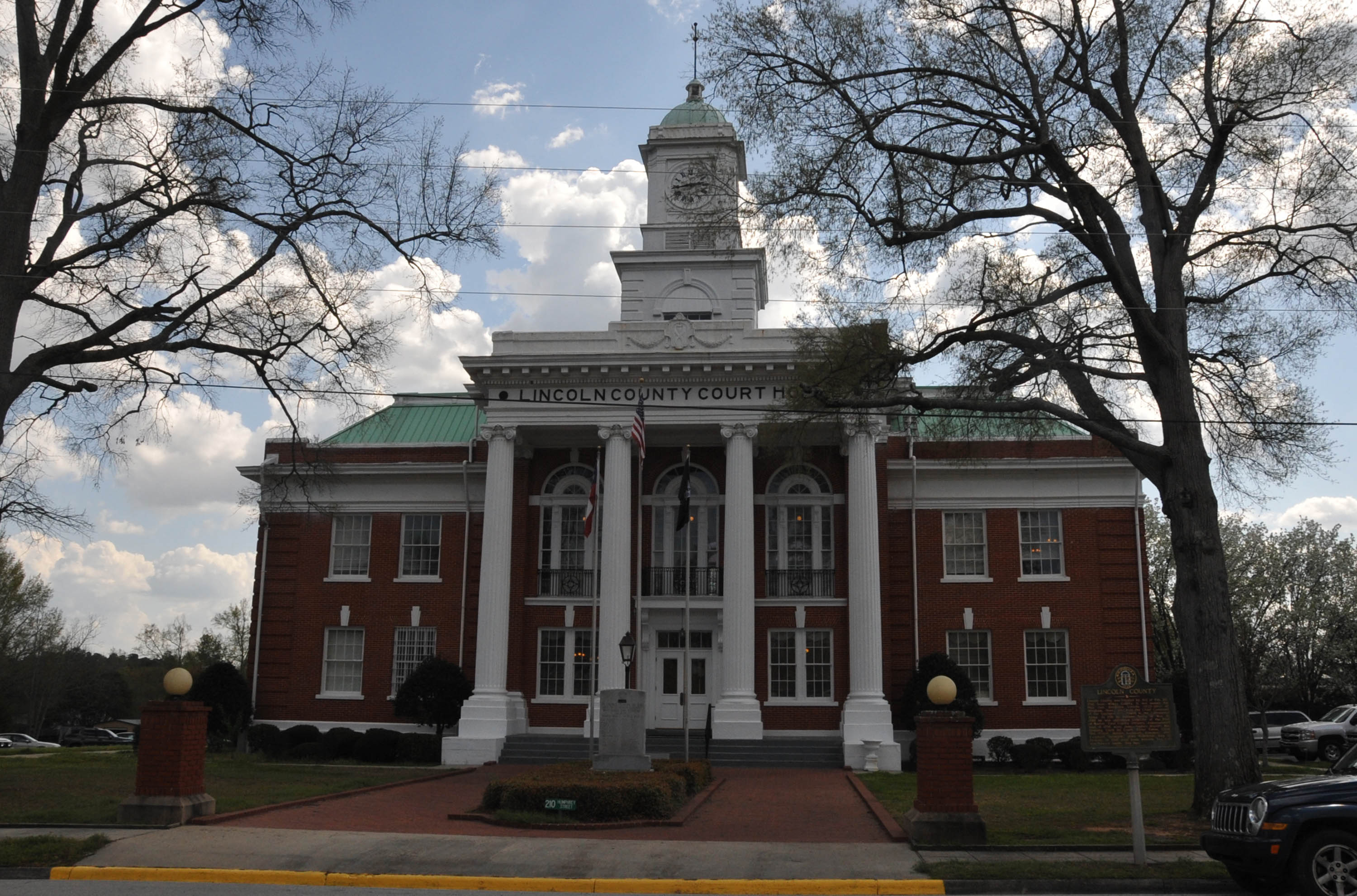
- Lincoln County Courthouse in Lincolnton

- Location within the U.S. state of Georgia
- Coordinates: 33°47′N 82°27′W
- Country: United States
- State: Georgia
- Founded: February 20, 1796; 230 years ago
- Named for: Benjamin Lincoln
- Seat: Lincolnton
- Largest city: Lincolnton

Area
  - Total: 257 sq mi (670 km^{2})
  - Land: 210 sq mi (540 km^{2})
  - Water: 47 sq mi (120 km^{2}) 18.2%

Population (2020)
  - Total: 7,690
  - Estimate (2025): 8,112 ▲
  - Density: 37/sq mi (14/km^{2})
- Time zone: UTC−5 (Eastern)
  - Summer (DST): UTC−4 (EDT)
- Congressional district: 10th
- Website: www.lincolncountyga.com

Lincoln County is a county located in the east central portion of the U.S. state of Georgia. As of the 2020 census, the population was 7,690. The county seat is Lincolnton. The county was created on February 20, 1796. Lincoln County is included in the Augusta-Richmond County, GA-SC metropolitan statistical area, the Savannah River forming its northeastern border. Located above the fall line, it is part of the Central Savannah River Area (CSRA) and a member of the CSRA Regional Development Center.

== History ==
On February 20, 1796, Lincoln County was established as the twenty-fourth county in the state of Georgia. Before then, its territory was part of Wilkes County, now on its western side. The new county was named after General Benjamin Lincoln (1733–1810), a Revolutionary War hero notable for receiving Gen. Cornwallis's sword at Yorktown, Virginia.

On January 22, 1852, the legislature changed the location of the line between Wilkes County and Lincoln County, although there is no extant record as to why the legislature made the change.

From before the American Revolutionary War until the 1950s, Lincoln County was primarily a farming and agricultural area. The development and creation of Clarks Hill Dam created a large reservoir that covered portions of Lincoln and nearby counties. Developers have created many residential neighborhoods and subdivisions in areas near the lake.

== Geography ==
According to the U.S. Census Bureau, the county has a total area of 257 square miles (670 km^{2}), of which 210 square miles (540 km^{2}) is land and 47 square miles (120 km^{2}) (18.2%) is water. The county is located in the Piedmont region of the state just above the fall line of the eastern United States.

The bulk of Lincoln County, from just south of Lincolnton heading north, is located in the Upper Savannah River sub-basin of the Savannah River basin, with the exception of a tiny sliver of the northernmost section of the county, which is located in the Broad River sub-basin of the larger Savannah River basin. The southern portion of the county is located in the Little River sub-basin of the same Savannah River basin.

=== Major highways ===
- U.S. Route 378
- State Route 43
  - State Route 43 Connector
- State Route 44
- State Route 47
- State Route 79
- State Route 220

=== Adjacent counties ===
- Elbert County, Georgia - north
- McCormick County, South Carolina - northeast
- Columbia County, Georgia - south
- McDuffie County, Georgia - southwest
- Wilkes County, Georgia - west

== Communities ==
=== City ===
- Lincolnton

=== Unincorporated community ===
- Chennault

== Demographics ==
Historical population
Census	Pop.	Note	%±
1800	4,766		—
1810	4,555		−4.4%
1820	6,458		41.8%
1830	6,145		−4.8%
1840	5,895		−4.1%
1850	5,998		1.7%
1860	5,466		−8.9%
1870	5,413		−1.0%
1880	6,412		18.5%
1890	6,146		−4.1%
1900	7,156		16.4%
1910	8,714		21.8%
1920	9,739		11.8%
1930	7,847		−19.4%
1940	7,042		−10.3%
1950	6,462		−8.2%
1960	5,906		−8.6%
1970	5,895		−0.2%
1980	6,716		13.9%
1990	7,442		10.8%
2000	8,348		12.2%
2010	7,996		−4.2%
2020	7,690		−3.8%
2025 (est.)	8,112	▲	5.5%
U.S. Decennial Census; 1790-1880 1890-1910; 1920-1930 1930-1940; 1940-1950 1960-1980; 1980-2000 2010

=== Racial and ethnic composition ===
Lincoln County, Georgia – Racial and ethnic composition Note: the US Census treats Hispanic/Latino as an ethnic category. This table excludes Latinos from the racial categories and assigns them to a separate category. Hispanics/Latinos may be of any race.
Race / Ethnicity (NH = Non-Hispanic)	Pop 1980	Pop 1990	Pop 2000	Pop 2010	Pop 2020	% 1980	% 1990	% 2000	% 2010	% 2020
White alone (NH)	3,820	4,573	5,321	5,201	5,196	56.88%	61.45%	63.74%	65.05%	67.57%
Black or African American alone (NH)	2,795	2,801	2,857	2,562	2,116	41.62%	37.64%	34.22%	32.04%	27.52%
Native American or Alaska Native alone (NH)	3	3	30	27	18	0.04%	0.04%	0.36%	0.34%	0.23%
Asian alone (NH)	6	9	7	32	20	0.09%	0.12%	0.08%	0.40%	0.26%
Native Hawaiian or Pacific Islander alone (NH)	x	x	4	1	3	x	x	0.05%	0.01%	0.04%
Other race alone (NH)	0	0	3	9	10	0.00%	0.00%	0.04%	0.11%	0.13%
Mixed race or Multiracial (NH)	x	x	45	66	235	x	x	0.54%	0.83%	3.06%
Hispanic or Latino (any race)	92	56	81	98	92	1.37%	0.75%	0.97%	1.23%	1.20%
Total	6,716	7,442	8,348	7,996	7,690	100.00%	100.00%	100.00%	100.00%	100.00%

=== 2020 census ===
As of the 2020 census, the county had a population of 7,690 and 2,142 families residing in the county. The median age was 48.7 years. 18.5% of residents were under the age of 18 and 24.7% of residents were 65 years of age or older. For every 100 females there were 95.3 males, and for every 100 females age 18 and over there were 94.5 males age 18 and over. 0.0% of residents lived in urban areas, while 100.0% lived in rural areas.

The racial makeup of the county was 68.1% White, 27.6% Black or African American, 0.2% American Indian and Alaska Native, 0.3% Asian, 0.0% Native Hawaiian and Pacific Islander, 0.3% from some other race, and 3.4% from two or more races. Hispanic or Latino residents of any race comprised 1.2% of the population.

There were 3,245 households in the county, of which 25.4% had children under the age of 18 living with them and 27.8% had a female householder with no spouse or partner present. About 29.3% of all households were made up of individuals and 15.5% had someone living alone who was 65 years of age or older.

There were 4,389 housing units, of which 26.1% were vacant. Among occupied housing units, 76.6% were owner-occupied and 23.4% were renter-occupied. The homeowner vacancy rate was 1.7% and the rental vacancy rate was 7.7%.

== Recreation and historical sites ==
Since the creation of Clarks Hill Lake, recreation has contributed to Lincoln County's growth. It is a main destination for tourists, providing fishing, boating, and other water sports opportunities for visitors and nearby residents.

Toward the eastern part of Lincoln County, just before the South Carolina line, is Elijah Clarke State Park. This park is roughly 447 acres (1.81 km^{2}). In May of every year, Elijah Clarke holds a bluegrass festival which has become a major attraction in the last 20 years. Several well-known bluegrass musicians play at this event each year, including Lincoln County natives, The Lewis Family. Also held annually at Elijah Clarke is an Arts and Crafts Festival and a Log Cabin Christmas.

There are many historic places to visit in Lincoln County. They include:

- Lamar-Blanchard House, Lincolnton, which is on the National Register of Historic Places
- The Lincoln County Historical Park
- Graves Mountain

== Economy ==
Economic growth has been associated with development of the J. Strom Thurmond Dam and Clarks Hill Lake. In Lincoln County, logging is a multimillion-dollar industry. More than 20 logging businesses produce most of the jobs for Lincoln County residents.

== Notable people ==
- Garrison Hearst- Former NFL player, pro bowler, comeback player in 1995 and 2001
- Barney Bussey - Former NFL player, played for the Cincinnati Bengals and then the Tampa Bay Buccaneers
- The Lewis Family - family bluegrass and gospel band, in 1992 they were inducted into Georgia Music Hall of Fame
- Tom Nash - NFL player for the Green Bay Packers and Brooklyn Dodgers

== Politics ==
As of the 2020s, Lincoln County is a strongly Republican voting county, voting 72% for Donald Trump in 2024. For elections to the United States House of Representatives, Lincoln County is part of Georgia's 10th congressional district, currently represented by Mike Collins. For elections to the Georgia State Senate, Lincoln County is part of District 24. For elections to the Georgia House of Representatives, Lincoln County is part of district District 123.

United States presidential election results for Lincoln County, Georgia
Year	Republican		Democratic		Third party(ies)	
Year	No.	%	No.	%	No.	%
1912	27	9.28%	264	90.72%	0	0.00%
1916	56	14.21%	333	84.52%	5	1.27%
1920	3	0.59%	509	99.41%	0	0.00%
1924	121	9.57%	847	67.01%	296	23.42%
1928	413	48.14%	445	51.86%	0	0.00%
1932	3	0.45%	660	99.40%	1	0.15%
1936	88	13.21%	561	84.23%	17	2.55%
1940	67	12.45%	466	86.62%	5	0.93%
1944	165	27.09%	444	72.91%	0	0.00%
1948	32	4.39%	99	13.58%	598	82.03%
1952	327	33.68%	644	66.32%	0	0.00%
1956	155	18.21%	696	81.79%	0	0.00%
1960	197	22.75%	669	77.25%	0	0.00%
1964	943	72.76%	353	27.24%	0	0.00%
1968	408	18.64%	491	22.43%	1,290	58.93%
1972	1,246	78.56%	340	21.44%	0	0.00%
1976	576	26.68%	1,583	73.32%	0	0.00%
1980	806	33.03%	1,617	66.27%	17	0.70%
1984	1,357	54.89%	1,115	45.11%	0	0.00%
1988	1,417	60.97%	893	38.43%	14	0.60%
1992	1,149	38.84%	1,327	44.86%	482	16.29%
1996	1,391	47.33%	1,334	45.39%	214	7.28%
2000	1,807	58.23%	1,275	41.09%	21	0.68%
2004	2,309	63.12%	1,337	36.55%	12	0.33%
2008	2,731	61.73%	1,650	37.30%	43	0.97%
2012	2,807	63.36%	1,586	35.80%	37	0.84%
2016	2,759	67.26%	1,273	31.03%	70	1.71%
2020	3,173	68.37%	1,432	30.86%	36	0.78%
2024	3,559	72.18%	1,351	27.40%	21	0.43%

United States Senate election results for Lincoln County, Georgia2
Year	Republican		Democratic		Third party(ies)	
Year	No.	%	No.	%	No.	%
2020	3,139	68.34%	1,371	29.85%	83	1.81%
2020	2,906	68.91%	1,311	31.09%	0	0.00%

United States Senate election results for Lincoln County, Georgia3
Year	Republican		Democratic		Third party(ies)	
Year	No.	%	No.	%	No.	%
2020	1,725	37.80%	803	17.60%	2,035	44.60%
2020	2,903	68.79%	1,317	31.21%	0	0.00%
2022	2,847	71.66%	1,077	27.11%	49	1.23%
2022	2,660	71.83%	1,043	28.17%	0	0.00%

Georgia Gubernatorial election results for Lincoln County
Year	Republican		Democratic		Third party(ies)	
Year	No.	%	No.	%	No.	%
2022	2,966	74.49%	992	24.91%	24	0.60%

== Education ==
The Lincoln County School District has three schools, including the Lincoln County High School.

== See also ==
- Central Savannah River Area
- National Register of Historic Places listings in Lincoln County, Georgia
- List of counties in Georgia
