= Elijah Clark State Park =

State park in Georgia, USA

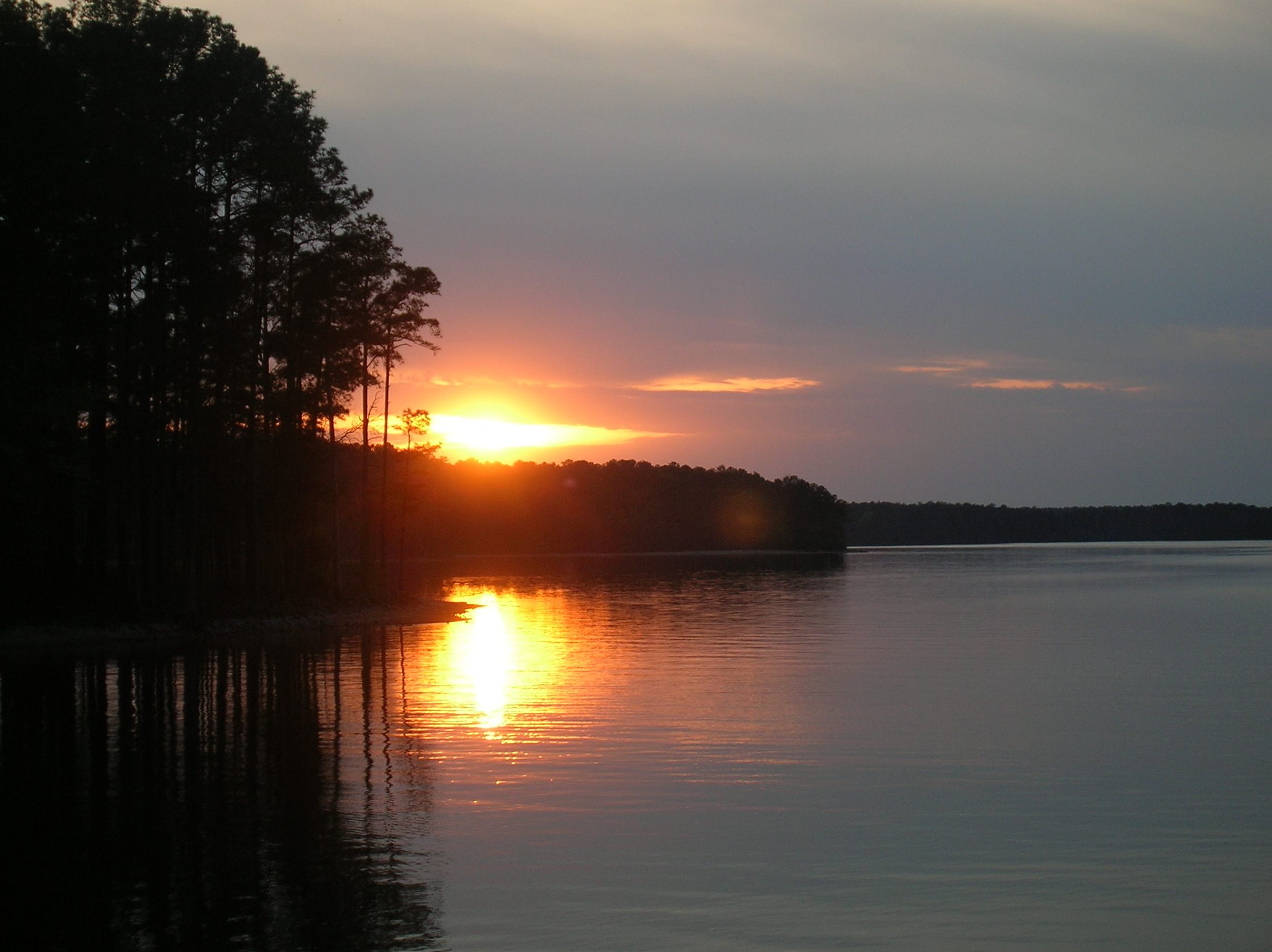
- The sunset over Lake Strom Thurmond, as seen from the shore of Elijah Clark State Park

- Location within Georgia
- Location: Lincoln County, Georgia
- Nearest city: Lincolnton, Georgia
- Coordinates: 33°51′16.2″N 82°25′10.54″W
- Area: 447 acres (1.81 km^{2})
- Website: Official website

Elijah Clark State Park is a 447-acre (1.81 km^{2}) Georgia state park located in Lincolnton, on the western shore of Lake Strom Thurmond. The park is named for Elijah Clarke, a frontiersman and war hero who led a force of pioneers in Georgia during the American Revolution. A reconstructed log cabin displays colonial life with furniture and tools dating back to 1780. The park is also the site of the graves of Clark and his wife, Hannah. The park's location on the lake makes it popular with fishermen.

== Facilities ==
- 160 tent/trailer/RV campsites
- 20 Cottages
- 10 Walk-In Campsites
- 2 Group Shelters
- Beach
- Nature trail
- 4 Picnic Shelters
- 1 Pioneer Campground
- 20 lake-front cottages
- Miniature golf course
- Children's playground

== Annual events ==
- Arts & Crafts Festival (Memorial Day weekend)
- Bluegrass Festival (May)
- Old Timer's Festival (October)
