= Lincoln County Courthouse (Georgia) =

- U.S. National Register of Historic Places
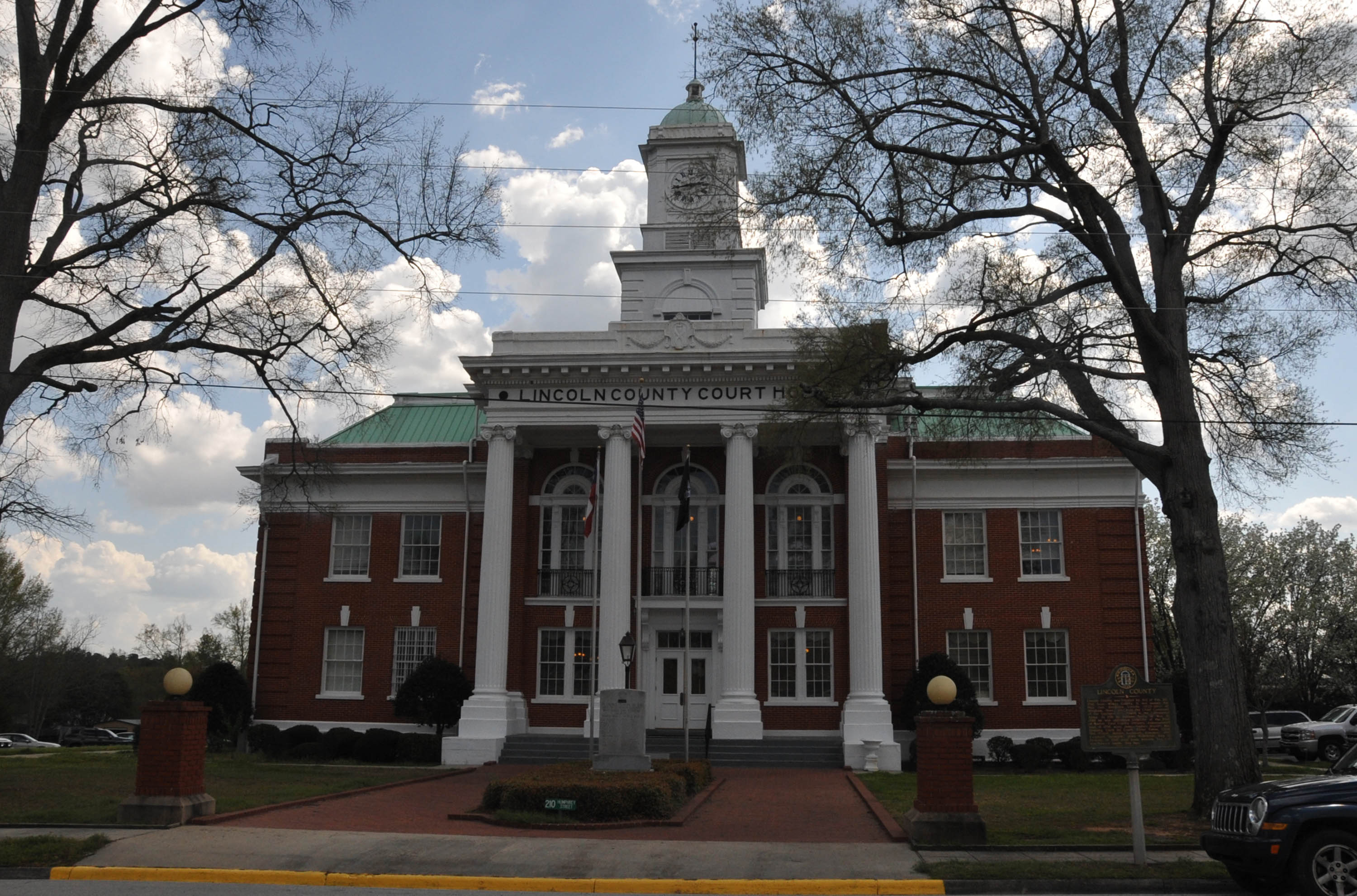

- Location within Georgia
- Location: Courthouse Sq., Lincolnton, Georgia
- Coordinates: 33°47′40″N 82°28′32″W
- Area: 1 acre (0.40 ha)
- Built: 1915
- Built by: Little, Cleckler Construction Co.
- Architect: G. Lloyd Preacher
- Architectural style: Classical Revival
- MPS: Georgia County Courthouses TR
- NRHP reference No.: 80001106
- Added to NRHP: September 18, 1980

The Lincoln County Courthouse, on Courthouse Sq. in Lincolnton, Georgia, was built in 1915. It was listed on the National Register of Historic Places in 1980.

It has a Doric tetrastyle projecting two-story portico with entablatures and a heavy cornice. It is topped by domed clock tower, which rises in the center of the building. The building has rectangular windows everywhere but for the courtroom, which has round-arched ones. The courtroom "ceiling is coved and has large recessed squares overhead. Pilasters atop painted panel wainscoting surround the courtroom. The egg and dart motif is used in the cornice. There is a skylight in the center of the room directly under the clock tower which has frosted glass panels, muting the sunlight that shines into the room."

It was designed or built by G. Lloyd Preacher, with Anniston, Alabama contractors Little, Cleckler Construction Co.
