= Danburg, Georgia =

Unincorporated community in Georgia, U.S.

Coordinates: 33°52′06″N 82°39′07″W

Danburg is an unincorporated community in Wilkes County, in the U.S. state of Georgia. It is about a mile southwest of the Lincoln County, Georgia line.

== History ==
A variant name was "Danburgh". The community derives its name from one Samuel Danforth (1798-1856). The Georgia General Assembly incorporated the place in 1904 as the "Town of Danburg", with municipal corporate limits extending in a one-mile radius from the front door of Anderson's country store. A post office called Danburg(h) was established in 1826, and remained in operation until 1980. Danburg's town charter was dissolved in 1995.

The Matthews House, located to the northeast of Danburg, in Lincoln County, is listed on the National Register of Historic Places.
