= Lincoln County High School (Georgia) =

Location
- 200 Charles Ward Elam Street; Lincolnton, Georgia 30817; United States
- Coordinates: 33.793257°N 82.476221°W

Information
- Motto: Forever Learning, Forever Leading.
- School district: Lincoln County School District
- Principal: Howie Gunby
- Teaching staff: 26.50 FTE
- Grades: 9-12
- Enrollment: 374 (2023–2024)
- Student to teacher ratio: 14.11
- Color
- Team name: Red Devils
- Accreditation: Southern Association of Colleges and Schools
- Telephone: (706) 359-3121
- Fax: (706) 359-3552
- Website: http://lchs.lincolncountyschools.org/

Lincoln County High School is a high school in Lincolnton, Georgia, United States. Its motto is "Forever Learning, Forever Leading". It is the successor of Lincolnton High School.
