= Lincolnton, Georgia =

- City
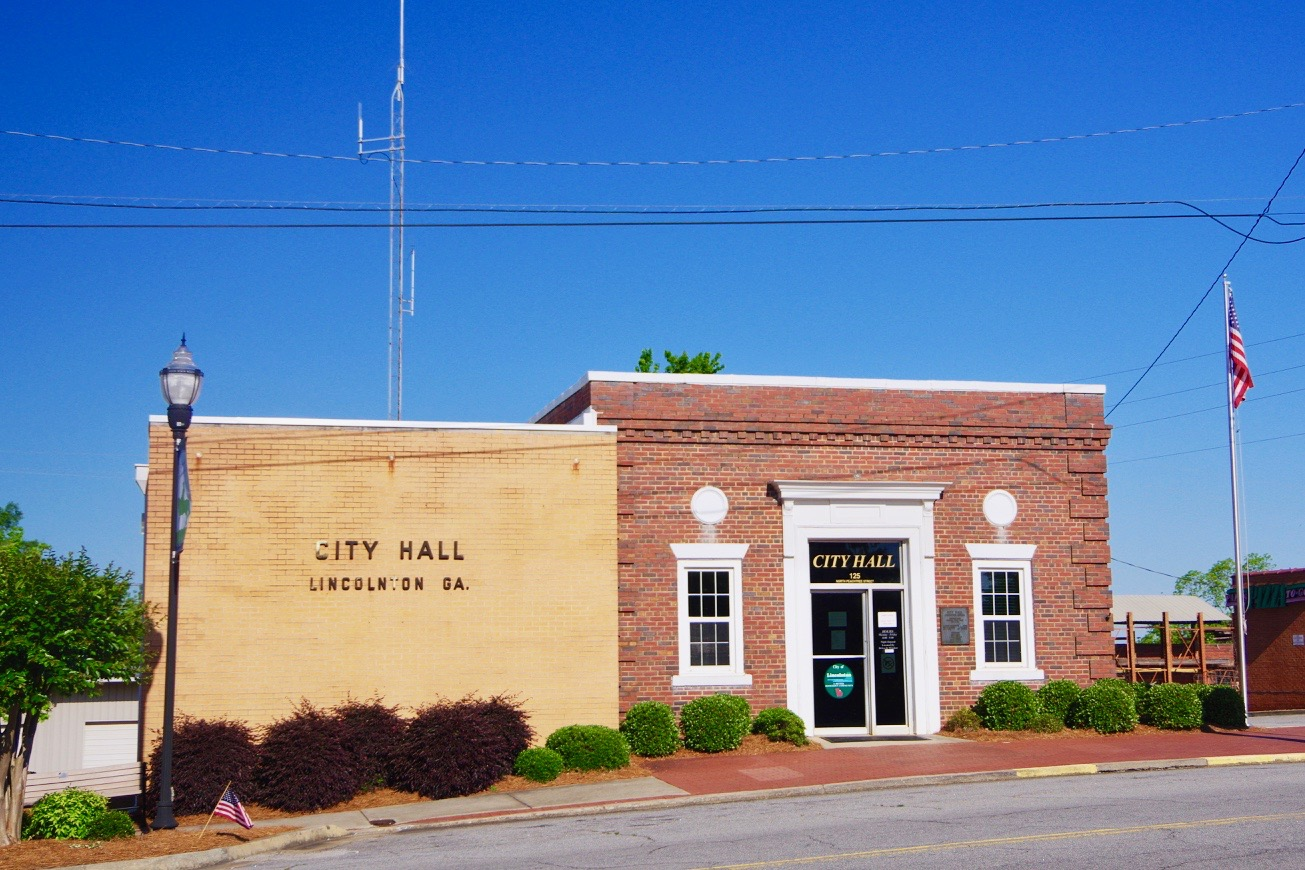
- City hall

- Location in Lincoln County and the state of Georgia
- Coordinates: 33°47′40″N 82°28′35″W
- Country: United States
- State: Georgia
- County: Lincoln

Area
  - Total: 3.53 sq mi (9.13 km^{2})
  - Land: 3.51 sq mi (9.10 km^{2})
  - Water: 0.012 sq mi (0.03 km^{2})
- Elevation: 469 ft (143 m)

Population (2020)
  - Total: 1,480
  - Density: 421.2/sq mi (162.61/km^{2})
- Time zone: UTC-5 (Eastern (EST))
  - Summer (DST): UTC-4 (EDT)
- ZIP code: 30817
- Area code: 706
- FIPS code: 13-46552
- GNIS feature ID: 0328514

Lincolnton is a city in and the county seat of Lincoln County, Georgia, United States. The population was 1,480 at the 2020 census. It contains numerous houses and historic districts listed on the National Register of Historic Places. Both the city and the county were named for General Benjamin Lincoln, who served in the Continental Army during the American Revolution.

== History ==
Lincolnton was founded in 1798 as seat of the newly formed Lincoln County. It was incorporated as a town in 1817 and as a city in 1953.

== Geography ==
Lincolnton is located in central Lincoln County at 33°47′40″N 82°28′35″W (33.794414, -82.476450). U.S. Route 378 passes through the center of town as Washington Street, leading southwest 17 miles (27 km) to Washington, and northeast 14 miles (23 km) to McCormick, South Carolina. Georgia State Route 79 leads northwest 38 miles (61 km) to Elberton, while State Route 43 leads south 24 miles (39 km) to Thomson. Augusta is 39 miles (63 km) to the southeast via State Routes 47 and 104. A historical site, Elijah Clark State Park, is 7 miles (11 km) northeast of Lincolnton at the Savannah River.

According to the United States Census Bureau, Lincolnton has a total area of 3.5 square miles (9.1 km^{2}), of which 0.01 square miles (0.03 km^{2}), or 0.35%, are water. The west side of the city drains to Florence Creek, while the east side drains to Dry Fork Creek, both of which flow to Soap Creek, an arm of the Savannah River within Lake Strom Thurmond (Clarks Hill Lake).

== Demographics ==
Historical population
Census	Pop.	Note	%±
1810	106		—
1870	92		—
1880	70		−23.9%
1890	220		214.3%
1900	221		0.5%
1910	375		69.7%
1920	657		75.2%
1930	916		39.4%
1940	894		−2.4%
1950	1,315		47.1%
1960	1,450		10.3%
1970	1,442		−0.6%
1980	1,406		−2.5%
1990	1,476		5.0%
2000	1,595		8.1%
2010	1,566		−1.8%
2020	1,480		−5.5%
U.S. Decennial Census

=== 2020 census ===
As of the 2020 census, Lincolnton had a population of 1,480. The median age was 40.7 years. 22.0% of residents were under the age of 18 and 20.5% of residents were 65 years of age or older. For every 100 females there were 83.2 males, and for every 100 females age 18 and over there were 80.0 males age 18 and over.

0.0% of residents lived in urban areas, while 100.0% lived in rural areas.

There were 604 households in Lincolnton, of which 31.6% had children under the age of 18 living in them. Of all households, 39.2% were married-couple households, 15.6% were households with a male householder and no spouse or partner present, and 40.9% were households with a female householder and no spouse or partner present. About 31.8% of all households were made up of individuals and 17.2% had someone living alone who was 65 years of age or older.

There were 670 housing units, of which 9.9% were vacant. The homeowner vacancy rate was 1.7% and the rental vacancy rate was 8.2%.

Lincolnton racial composition
Race	Num.	Perc.
White	806	54.46%
Black or African American	601	40.61%
Asian	11	0.74%
Other/Mixed	42	2.84%
Hispanic or Latino	20	1.35%

There were 442 families residing in the city.

== Education ==
=== Lincoln County School District ===
The Lincoln County School District holds pre-school to grade twelve, and consists of an elementary school, a middle school, and a high school. The district has 98 full-time teachers and over 1,450 students.

- Lincoln County Elementary School
- Lincoln County Middle School
- Lincoln County High School

== Notable people ==
- Barney Bussey, former NFL player
- Jeff and Sheri Easter, musicians
- Garrison Hearst, former NFL player
- Little Roy Lewis and The Lewis Family, gospel bluegrass musicians
- Lizzy Long, bluegrass/gospel musician, The Little Roy and Lizzy Show
- Pettis Norman, former NFL player
- Jarius Wynn, Buffalo Bills defensive end

== See also ==
- Central Savannah River Area
- Providence Ferry, Georgia
