= Battle of Fredericksburg =

1862 battle of the American Civil War

- Part of the American Civil War
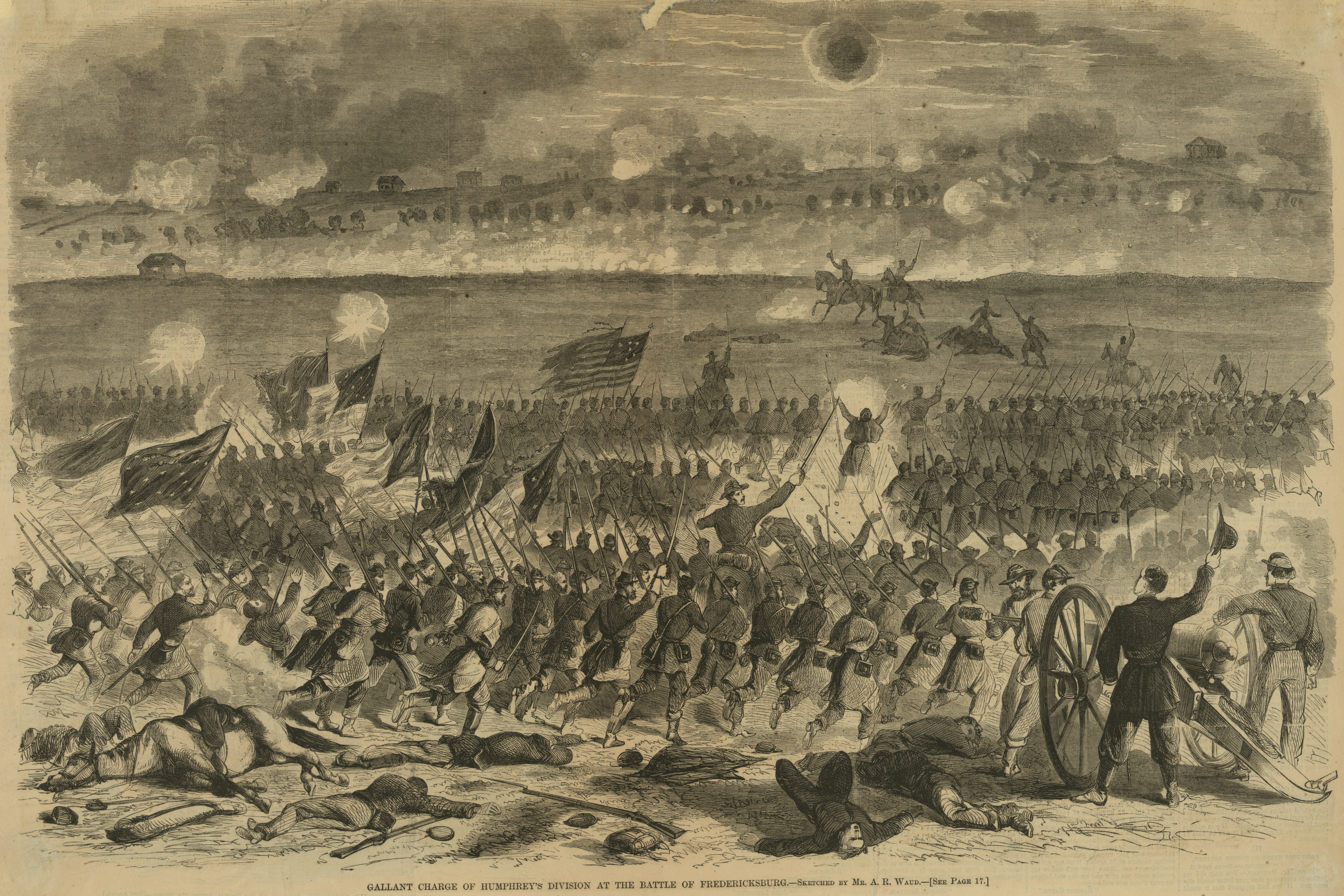
- Gallant Charge of Humphrey's Division at the Battle of Fredericksburg
Date	December 11–15, 1862
Location	Spotsylvania County and Fredericksburg, Virginia 38°17′42″N 77°28′12″W
Result	Confederate victory

Belligerents
United States (Union)	(Confederate States of America) Confederate States

Commanders and leaders
Ambrose Burnside	Robert E. Lee

Units involved
Army of the Potomac	Army of Northern Virginia

Strength
122,009 114,000 engaged (estimated)	78,513 72,500 engaged (estimated)

Casualties and losses
12,653 1,284 killed 9,600 wounded 1,769 captured/missing	5,377 608 killed 4,116 wounded 653 captured/missing

The Battle of Fredericksburg was fought December 11–15, 1862, in and around Fredericksburg, Virginia, in the eastern theater of the American Civil War. The combat between the Union Army of the Potomac commanded by Maj. Gen. Ambrose Burnside and the Confederate Army of Northern Virginia under Gen. Robert E. Lee included futile frontal attacks by the Union army on December 13 against entrenched Confederate lines, hurling themselves against a feature of the battlefield that came to be remembered as the 'sunken wall' on the heights overlooking the city. It is remembered as one of the most one-sided battles of the war, with Union casualties more than twice as heavy as those suffered by the Confederates. A visitor to the battlefield described the battle as a "butchery" to President Abraham Lincoln.

Burnside planned to cross the Rappahannock River at Fredericksburg in mid-November and race to the Confederate capital of Richmond before Lee's army could stop him. Burnside needed to receive the necessary pontoon bridges in time, and Lee moved his army to block the crossings. When the Union army was finally able to build its bridges and cross under fire, direct combat within the city resulted on December 11–12. Union troops prepared to assault Confederate defensive positions south of the city and on a strongly fortified ridge just west of the city known as Marye's Heights.

On December 13, the Left Grand Division of Maj. Gen. William B. Franklin was able to pierce the first defensive line of Confederate Lt. Gen. Stonewall Jackson to the south but was finally repulsed. Burnside ordered the Right and Center Grand Divisions of major generals Edwin V. Sumner and Joseph Hooker to launch multiple frontal assaults against Lt. Gen. James Longstreet's position on Marye's Heights – all were repulsed with heavy losses. On December 15, Burnside withdrew his army, ending another failed Union campaign in the eastern theater.

== Background ==
=== Military situation ===
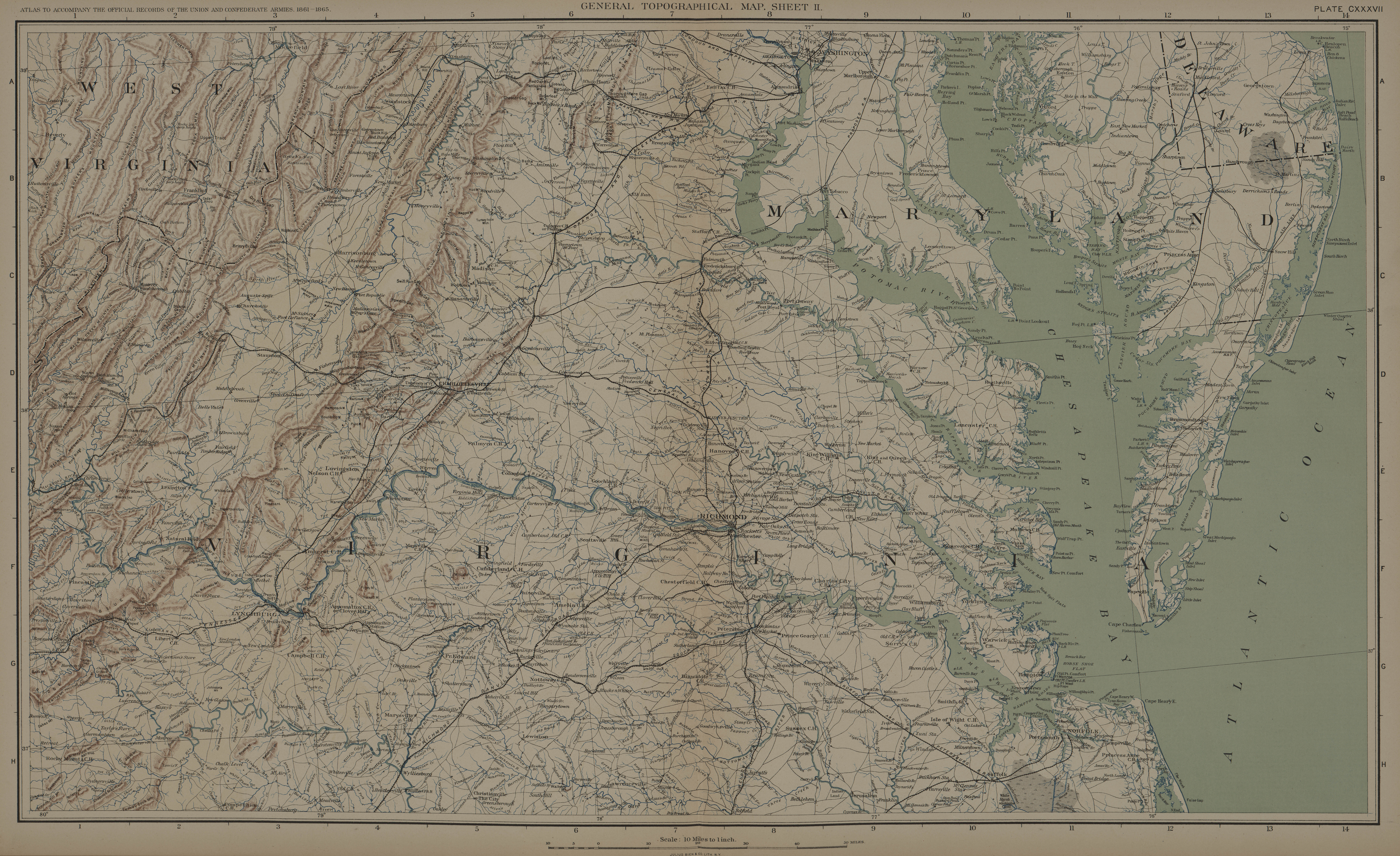
Virginia, 1862

In November 1862, U.S. president Abraham Lincoln needed to demonstrate the success of the Union war effort before the Northern public lost confidence in his administration. Confederate armies had been on the move earlier in the fall, invading Kentucky and Maryland. Although each had been turned back, those armies remained intact and capable of further action. Lincoln urged Major General Ulysses S. Grant to advance against the Confederate stronghold of Vicksburg, Mississippi. He replaced Maj. Gen. Don Carlos Buell with Maj. Gen. William S. Rosecrans, hoping for a more aggressive posture against the Confederates in Tennessee, and on November 5, seeing that his replacement of Buell had not stimulated Maj. Gen. George B. McClellan into action, Lincoln issued orders to replace McClellan in command of the Army of the Potomac. McClellan had stopped General Robert E. Lee's forces at the Battle of Antietam in Maryland but had not been able to destroy Lee's army, nor did he pursue Lee back into Virginia aggressively enough for Lincoln.

McClellan's replacement was Maj. Gen. Ambrose Burnside, the commander of the IX Corps. Burnside had established a reputation as an independent commander, with successful operations earlier that year in coastal North Carolina and, unlike McClellan, had no apparent political ambitions. However, he felt unqualified for army-level command and objected when offered the position. He accepted only when it was made clear to him that McClellan would be replaced in any event and that a choice for command was Maj. Gen. Joseph Hooker, whom Burnside disliked and distrusted. Burnside assumed command on November 7.

=== Burnside's plan ===
In response to prodding from Lincoln and general-in-chief Maj. Gen. Henry W. Halleck, Burnside planned a late fall offensive; he communicated his plan to Halleck on November 9. The plan relied on quick movement and deception. He would concentrate his army in a visible fashion near Warrenton, feigning a movement on Culpeper Court House, Orange Court House or Gordonsville. He would then rapidly shift his army southeast and cross the Rappahannock River to Fredericksburg, hoping that Lee would not move, unclear as to Burnside's intentions. At the same time, the Union Army made a rapid movement against Richmond, south along the Richmond, Fredericksburg and Potomac Railroad (RF&P) from Fredericksburg. Burnside selected this plan because he was concerned that if he were to move directly south from Warrenton, he would be exposed to a flanking attack from Lt. Gen. Thomas J. "Stonewall" Jackson, whose corps was at that time in the Shenandoah Valley south of Winchester. He also believed that the Orange and Alexandria Railroad (O&A) would need to be an adequate supply line. (Burnside was also influenced by plans McClellan began developing just before being relieved. Aware that Lee had blocked the O&A, McClellan considered a route through Fredericksburg and ordered a small group of cavalrymen commanded by Captain Ulric Dahlgren to investigate the condition of the RF&P.) While Burnside began assembling a supply base at Falmouth, near Fredericksburg, the Lincoln administration undertook a lengthy debate about the wisdom of his plan, which differed from the president's preference of a movement south on the O&A and a direct confrontation with Lee's army instead of the movement focused on the city of Richmond. Lincoln reluctantly approved the plan on November 14 but cautioned his general to move with great speed, certainly doubting that Lee would react as Burnside anticipated.

=== Movement to battle ===
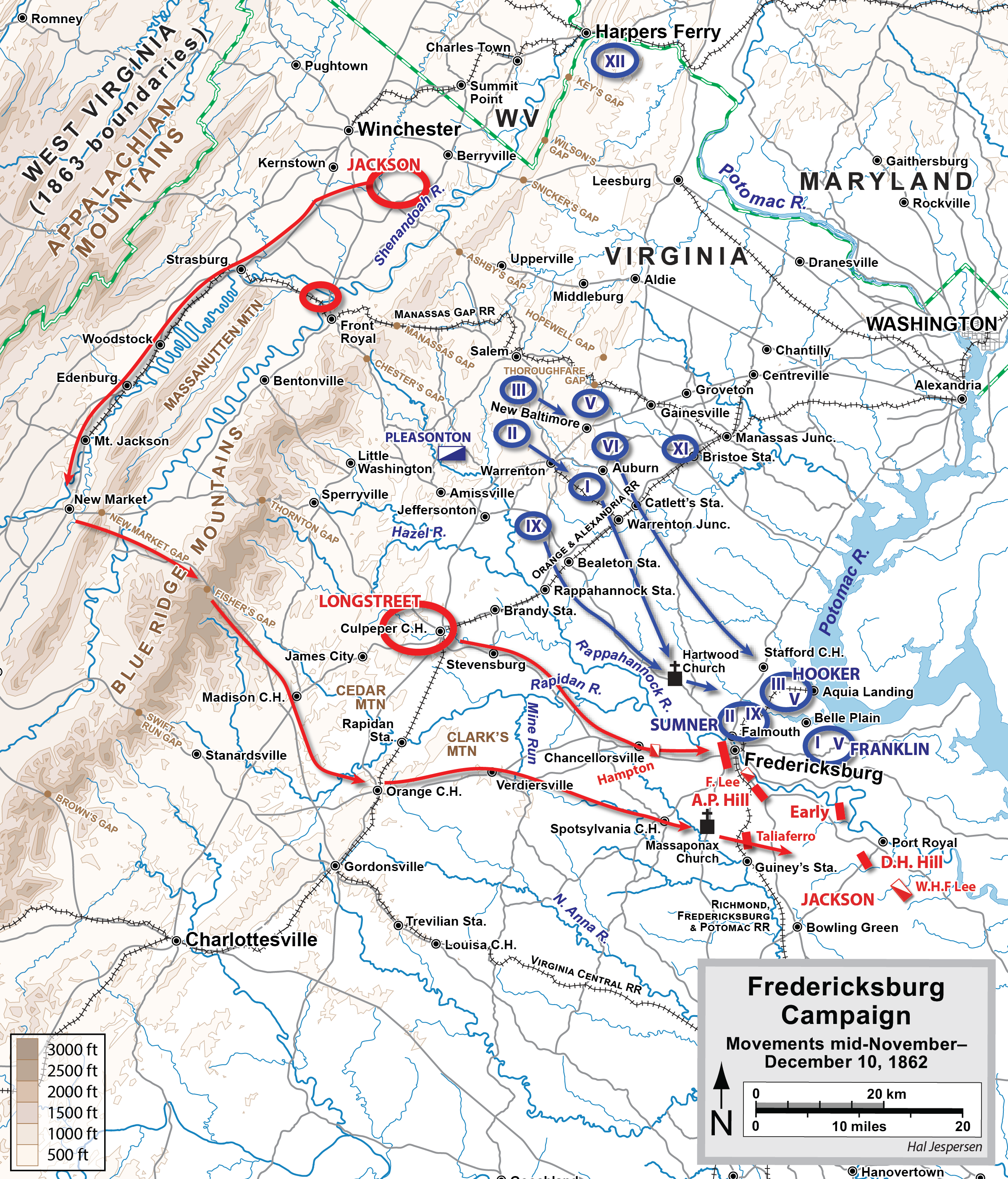
Initial movements in the Fredericksburg campaign Confederate Union

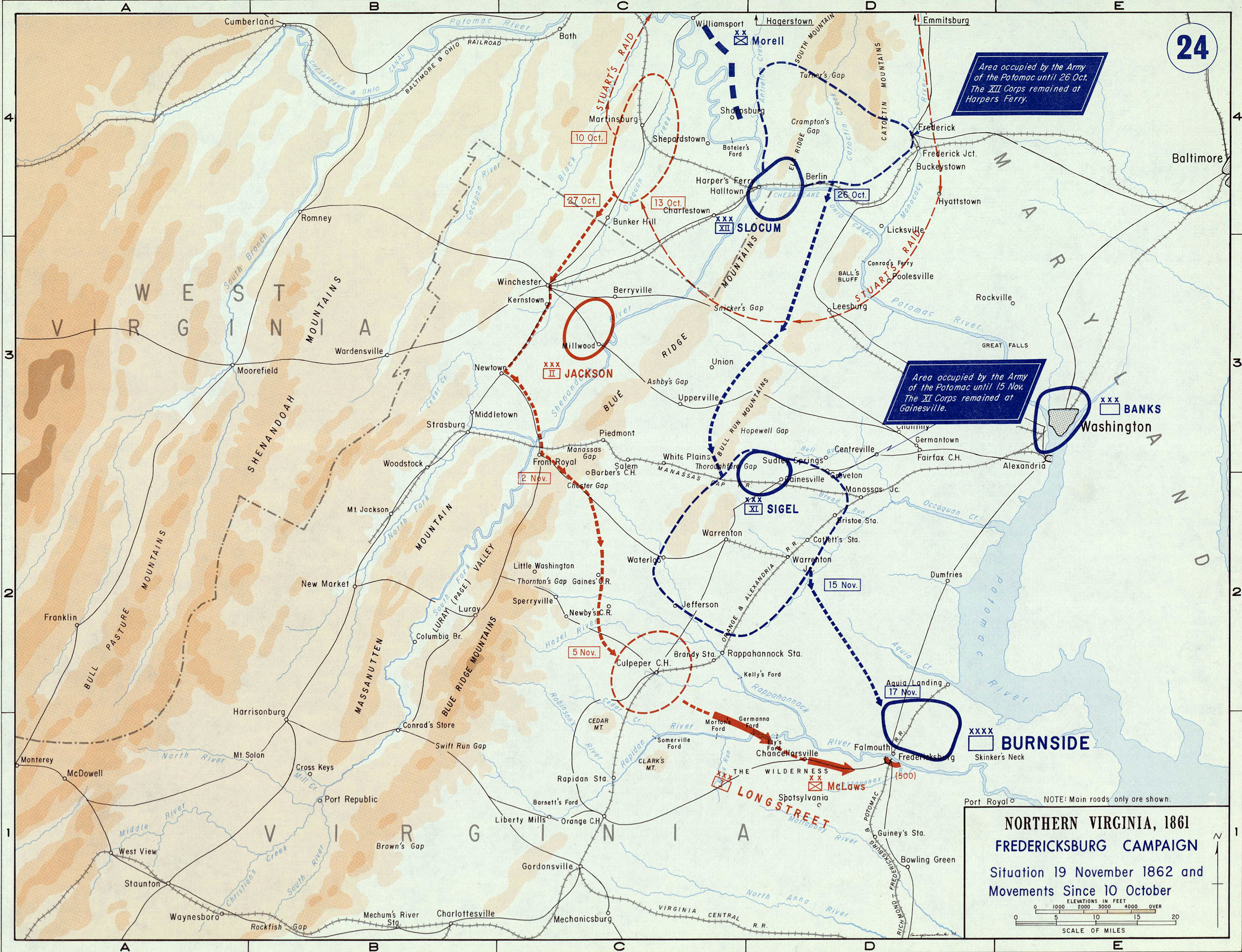
Fredericksburg campaign, situation November 19, 1862, and movements since October 10

The Union Army began marching on November 15, and the first elements arrived in Falmouth on November 17. Burnside's plan quickly went awry—he had ordered pontoon bridges to be sent to the front and assembled for his quick crossing of the Rappahannock, but because of administrative bungling, the bridges did not arrive on time. Burnside first requisitioned the pontoon bridging (along with many other provisions) on November 7 when he detailed his plan to Halleck. The plan was sent to the attention of Brig. Gen. George Washington Cullum, the chief of staff in Washington (received on November 9). Plans called for both riverine and overland movement of the pontoon trains to Falmouth. On November 14, the 50th New York Engineers reported the pontoons were ready to move, except for a lack of the 270 horses needed to move them. Unknown to Burnside, most of the bridging was still on the upper Potomac. Communications between Burnside's staff engineer Cyrus B. Comstock and the Engineer Brigade commander Daniel P. Woodbury indicate that Burnside had assumed the bridging was en route to Washington based on orders given on November 6.

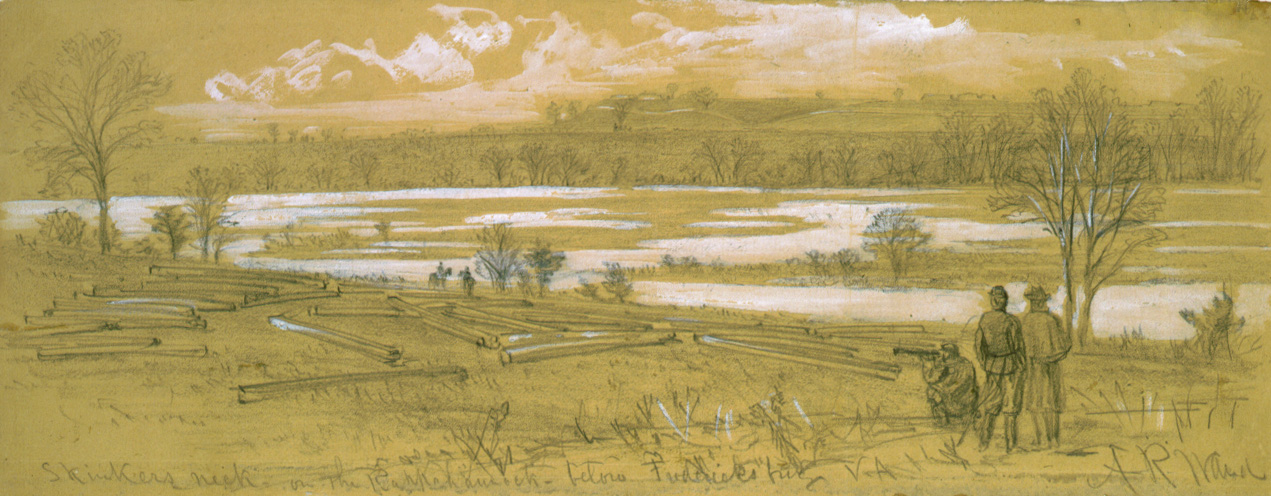
Skinkers Neck on the Rappanhannock below Fredericksburg, VA, 1862 sketch by Alfred Waud

As Maj. Gen. Edwin V. Sumner arrived, he strongly urged an immediate crossing of the river to scatter the token Confederate force of 500 men in the town and occupying the commanding heights to the west. Burnside became anxious, concerned that the increasing autumn rains would make the fording points unusable and that Sumner might be cut off and destroyed, ordering Sumner to wait in Falmouth.

Lee at first anticipated that Burnside would beat him across the Rappahannock and that to protect Richmond, he would assume the next defensible position to the south, the North Anna River. But when he saw how slowly Burnside was moving (and Confederate president Jefferson Davis expressed reservations about planning for a battle so close to Richmond), he directed all of his army toward Fredericksburg. By November 23, the corps commanded by Lt. Gen. James Longstreet had arrived and Lee placed them on the ridge known as Marye's Heights to the west of town, with Anderson's division on the far left, McLaws's directly behind the town, and Pickett's and Hood's to the right. He sent for Jackson on November 26, but his Second Corps commander had anticipated the need and began forced-marching his troops from Winchester on November 22, covering as many as 20 miles a day. Jackson arrived at Lee's headquarters on November 29 and his divisions were deployed to prevent Burnside crossing downstream from Fredericksburg: D.H. Hill's division moved to Port Royal, 18 miles down river; Early's 12 miles down river at Skinker's Neck; A.P. Hill's at Thomas Yerby's house, "Belvoir", about 6 miles southeast of town; and Taliaferro's along the RF&P Railroad, 4 miles south at Guinea Station.

The boats and equipment for a single pontoon bridge arrived at Falmouth on November 25, much too late to enable the Army of the Potomac to cross the river without opposition. Burnside still had an opportunity, however, because by then he was facing only half of Lee's army, not yet dug in, and if he acted quickly, he might have been able to attack Longstreet and defeat him before Jackson arrived. Once again he squandered his opportunity. The full complement of bridges arrived at the end of the month, but by this time Jackson was present and Longstreet was preparing strong defenses.

Burnside originally planned to cross his army east of Fredericksburg at Skinker's Neck, but an advance movement by Federal gunboats to there was fired upon and drew Early's and D.H. Hill's divisions into that area, a movement spotted by Union balloon observers. Now assuming that Lee had anticipated his plan, Burnside guessed that the Confederates had weakened their left and center to concentrate against him on their right. So he decided to cross directly at Fredericksburg. On December 9, he wrote to Halleck, "I think now the enemy will be more surprised by a crossing immediately in our front than any other part of the river. ... I'm convinced that a large force of the enemy is now concentrated at Port Royal, its left resting on Fredericksburg, which we hope to turn." In addition to his numerical advantage in troop strength, Burnside also had the advantage of knowing his army could not be attacked effectively. On the other side of the Rappahannock, 220 artillery pieces had been located on the ridge known as Stafford Heights to prevent Lee's army from mounting any major counterattacks.

== Opposing forces ==
=== Union ===
Key commanders (Army of the Potomac)
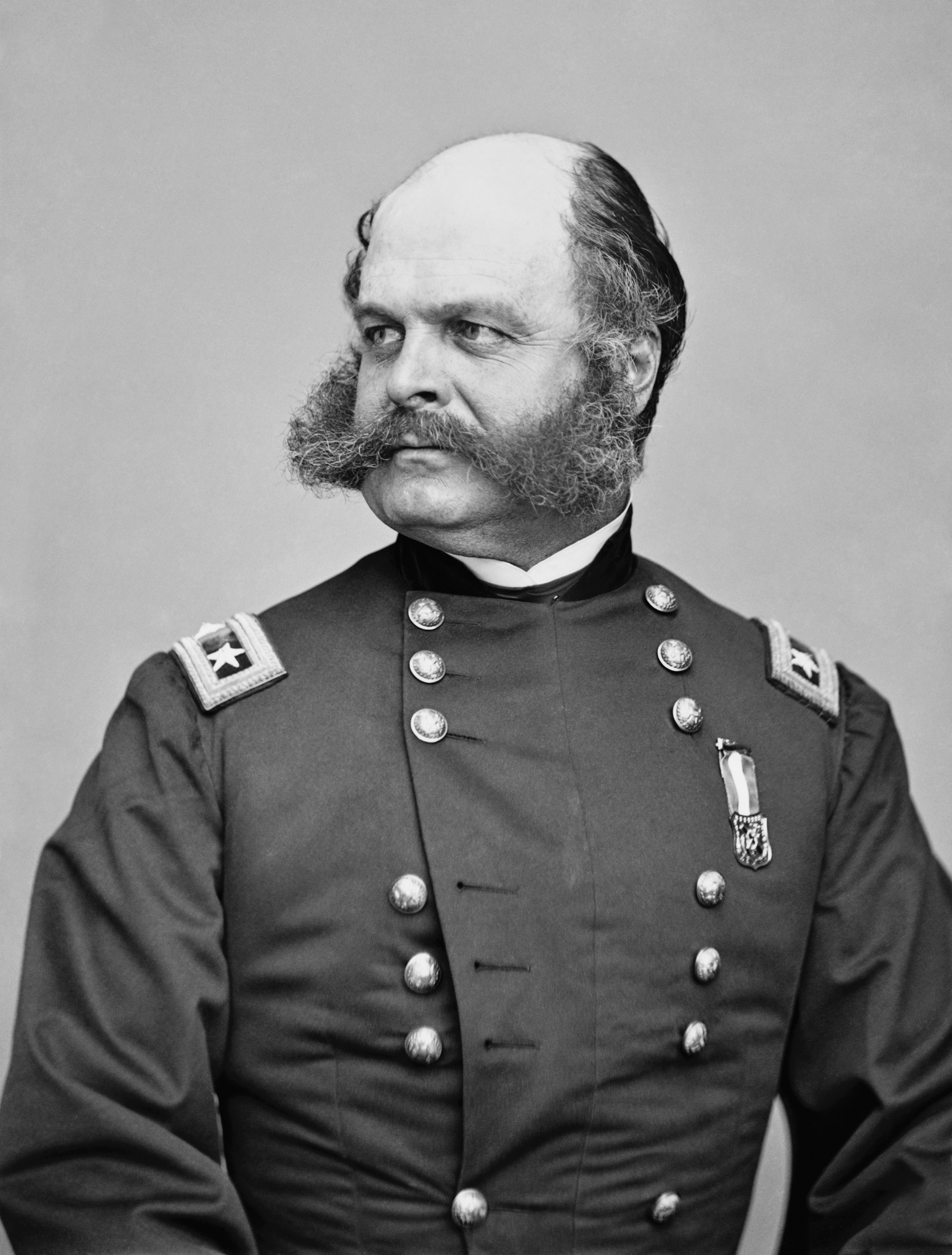
Maj. Gen.
Ambrose Burnside,
(Commanding)

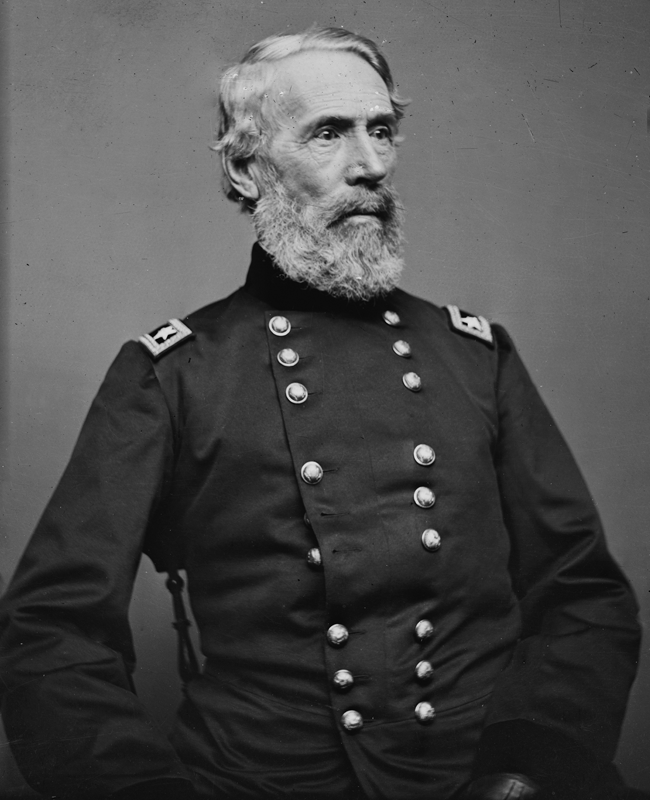
Maj. Gen.
Edwin V. Sumner,
Right Grand Division

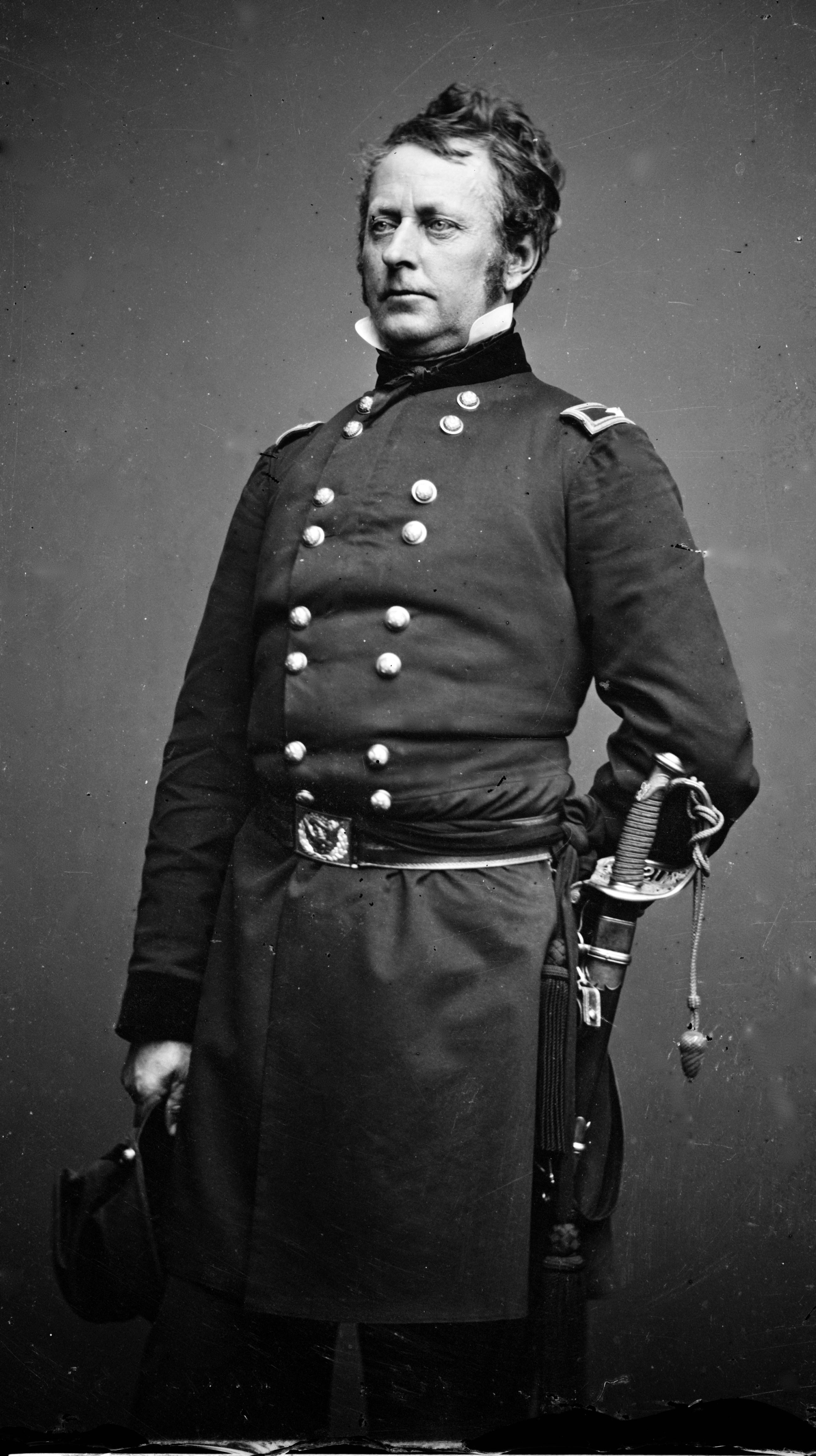
Maj. Gen.
Joseph Hooker,
Center Grand Division

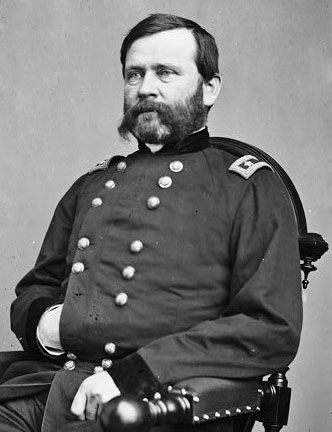
Maj. Gen.
William B. Franklin,
Left Grand Division

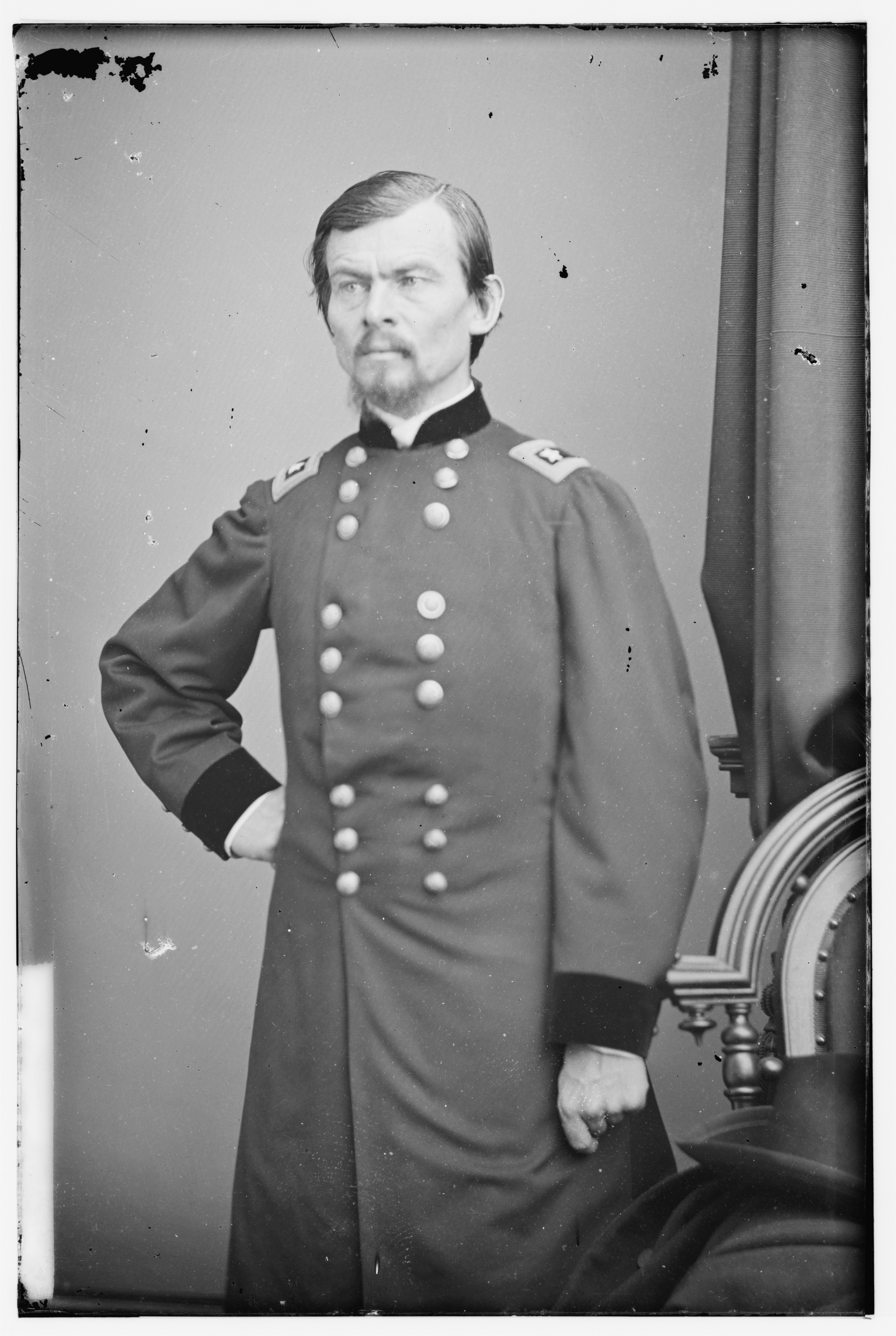
Maj. Gen.
Franz Sigel,
XI Corps; Held in reserve

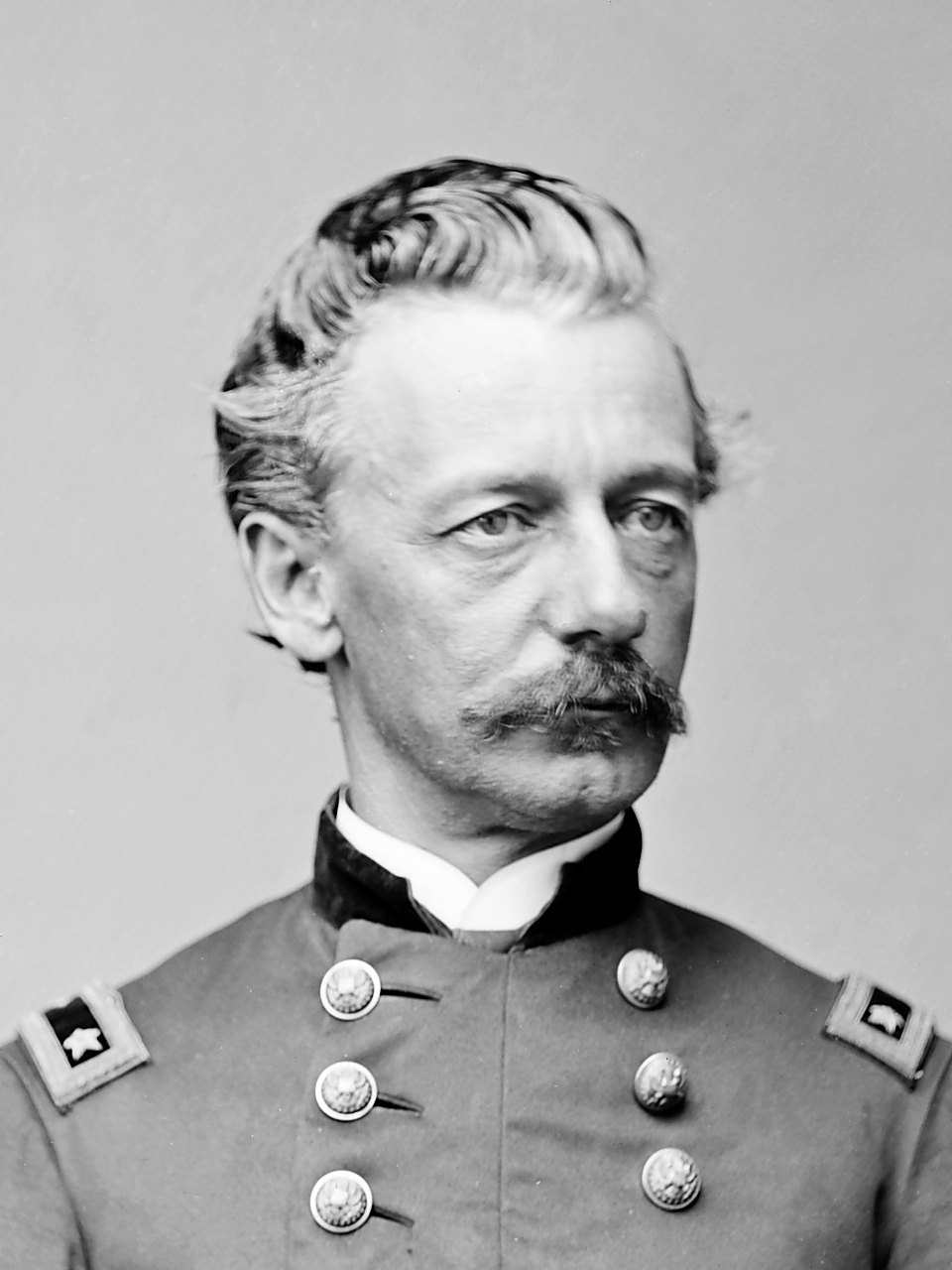
Maj. Gen.
Henry Warner Slocum,
XII Corps; Held in reserve

Burnside organized his Army of the Potomac into three so-called grand divisions, organizations that included infantry corps, cavalry, and artillery, comprising 120,000 men, of whom 114,000 would be engaged in the coming battle:

- The Right Grand Division, commanded by Maj. Gen. Edwin V. "Bull" Sumner, consisted of the II Corps of Maj. Gen. Darius N. Couch (divisions of major generals Winfield S. Hancock, Oliver O. Howard, and William H. French) and the IX Corps of Brig. Gen. Orlando B. Willcox (divisions of brigadier generals William W. Burns, Samuel D. Sturgis, and George W. Getty). A cavalry division under Brig. Gen. Alfred Pleasonton was attached.
- The Center Grand Division, commanded by Maj. Gen. Joseph Hooker, consisted of the III Corps of Brig. Gen. George Stoneman (divisions of Brig. Gens. David B. Birney, Daniel E. Sickles, and Amiel W. Whipple) and the V Corps of Maj. Gen. Daniel Butterfield (divisions of Brig. Gens. Charles Griffin, Andrew A. Humphreys, and Maj. Gen. George Sykes (brigades of Brig. Gen. Abram S. Piatt)). A cavalry brigade under Brig. Gen. William W. Averell was attached.
- The Left Grand Division, commanded by Maj. Gen. William B. Franklin, consisted of the I Corps of Maj. Gen. John F. Reynolds (divisions of Brig. Gens. Abner Doubleday and John Gibbon and Maj. Gen. George G. Meade) and the VI Corps of Maj. Gen. William F. "Baldy" Smith (divisions of Brig. Gens. William T. H. Brooks, Albion P. Howe, and John Newton). A cavalry brigade commanded by Brig. Gen. George D. Bayard was attached.
- The Reserve, commanded by Maj. Gen. Franz Sigel of the XI Corps, was in the area of Fairfax Court House. The XII Corps, under Maj. Gen. Henry W. Slocum, was called from Harpers Ferry to Dumfries, Virginia, to join the reserve force on December 9, but none of these troops participated in the battle.

=== Confederate ===
Key Commanders (Army of Northern Virginia)
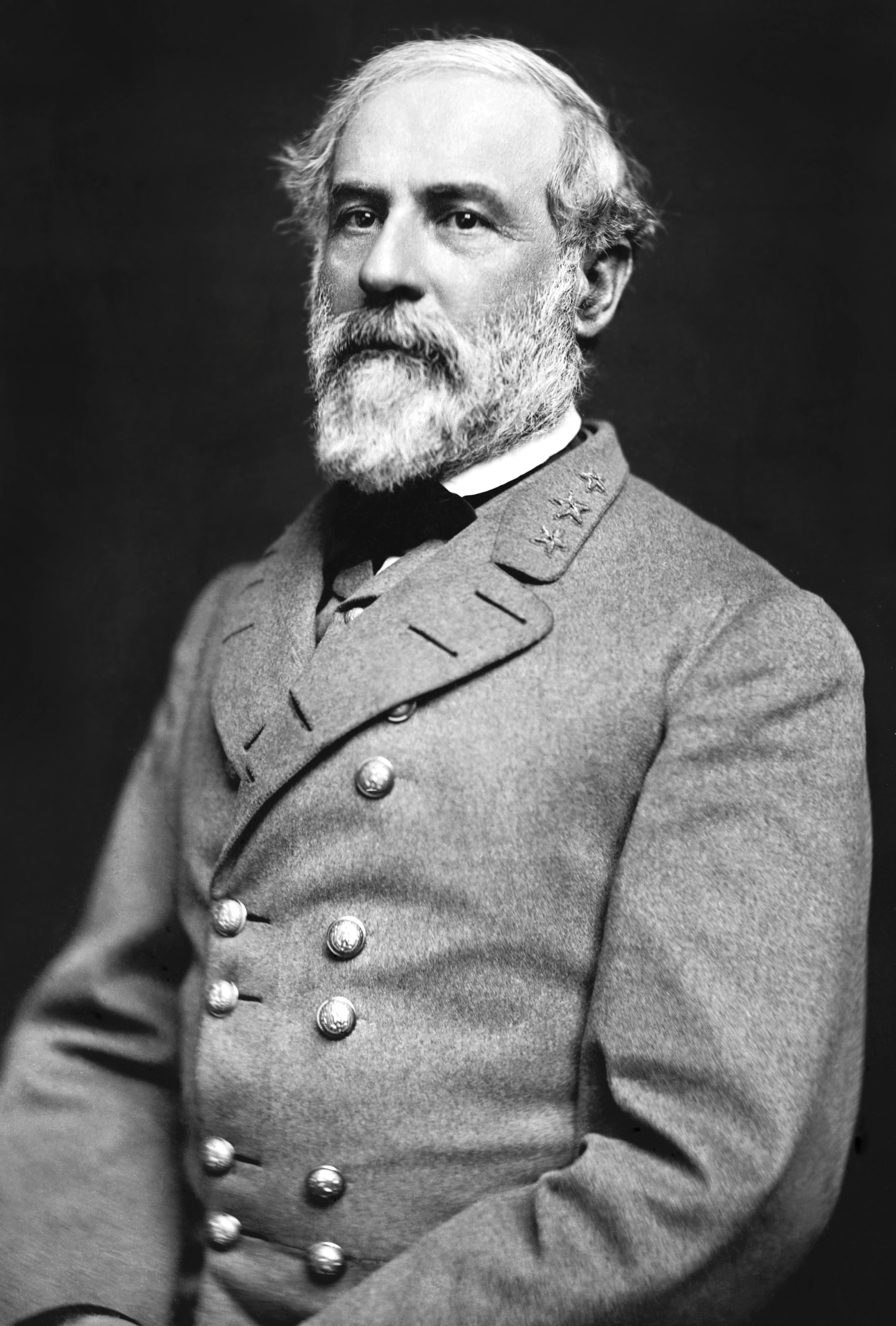
Gen.
Robert E. Lee,
(Commanding)

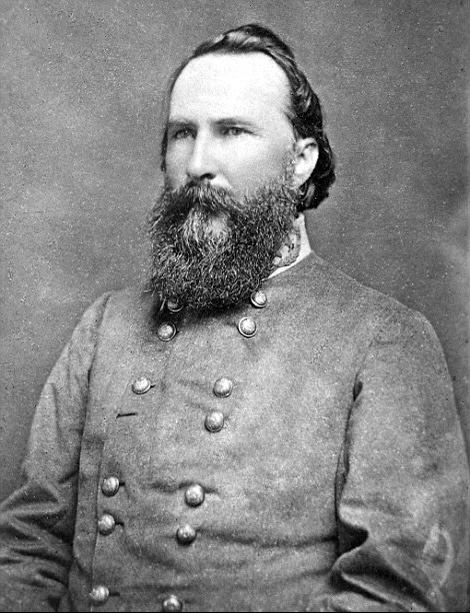
Lt. Gen.
James Longstreet,
First Corps

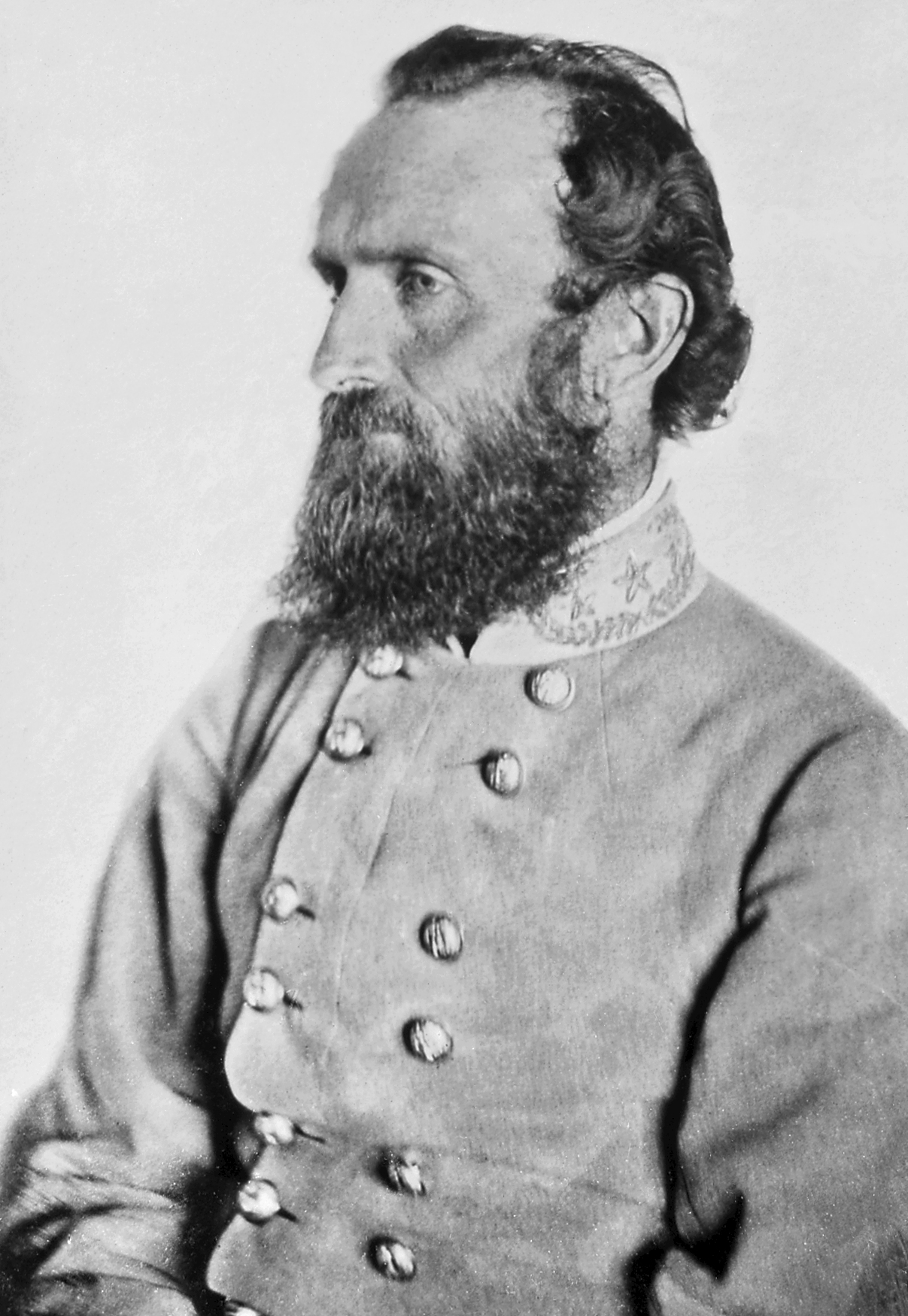
Lt. Gen.
Stonewall Jackson,
Second Corps

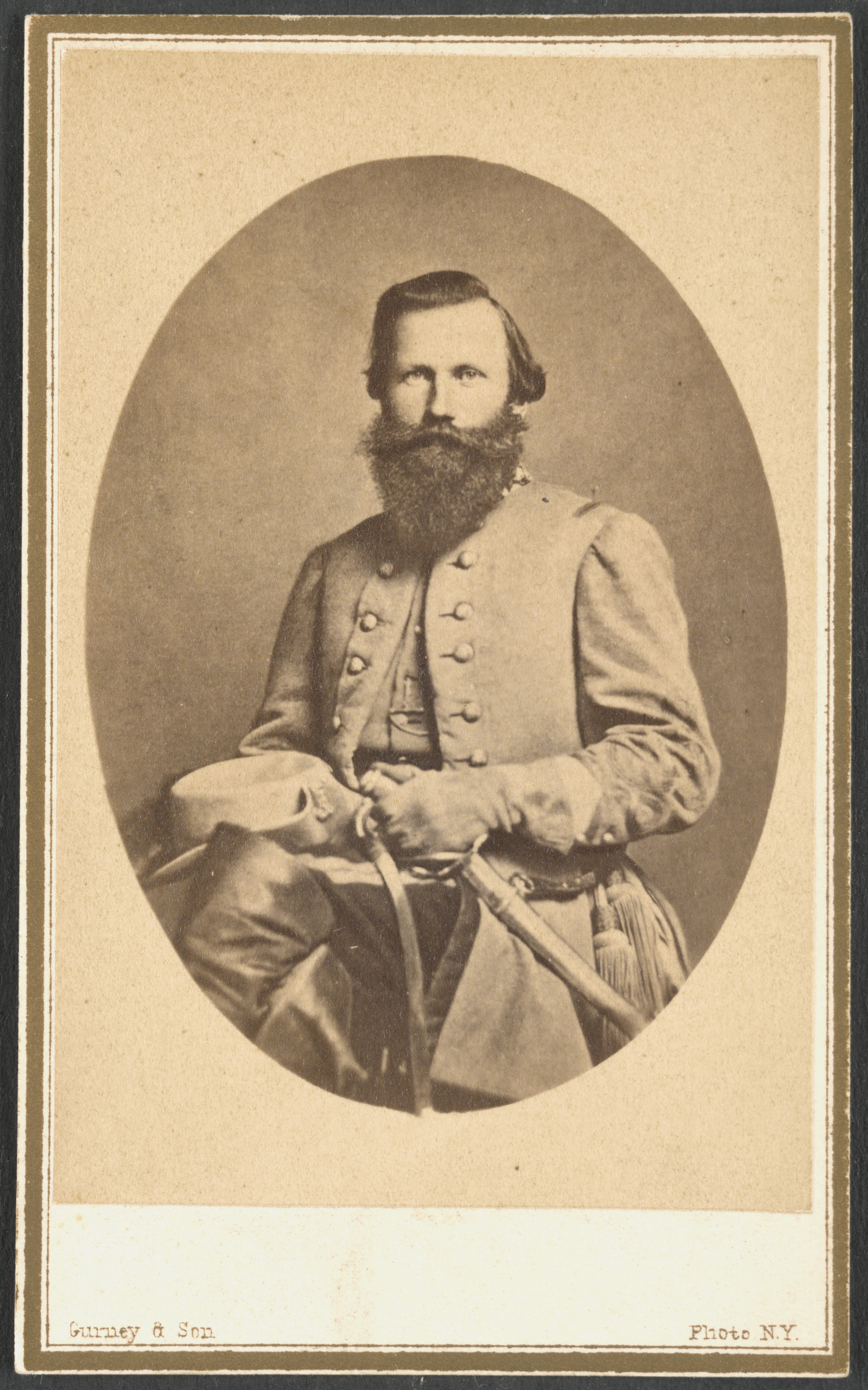
Maj. Gen.
J.E.B. Stuart,
Cav. Div.

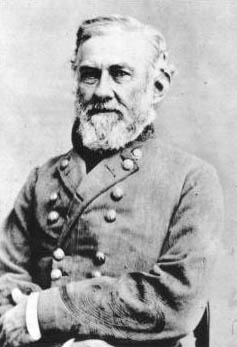
Brig. Gen.
William N. Pendleton,
Artillery Reserve

Robert E. Lee's Army of Northern Virginia had nearly 79,000 men, with 72,500 engaged. His organization of the army in corps was approved by an act of the Confederate Congress on November 6, 1862, and consisted of:

- The First Corps of Lt. Gen. James Longstreet included the divisions of Maj. Gens. Lafayette McLaws, Richard H. Anderson, George E. Pickett, and John Bell Hood, and Brig. Gen. Robert Ransom, Jr.
- The Second Corps of Lt. Gen. Thomas J. "Stonewall" Jackson included the divisions of Maj. Gens. D.H. Hill and A.P. Hill, and Brig. Gens. Jubal A. Early and William B. Taliaferro.
- Reserve artillery under Brig. Gen. William N. Pendleton.
- The cavalry division under Maj. Gen. J.E.B. Stuart.

The two armies at Fredericksburg represented the largest number of armed men that ever confronted each other for combat during the Civil War.

== Battle ==
=== Crossing the Rappahannock, December 11–12 ===
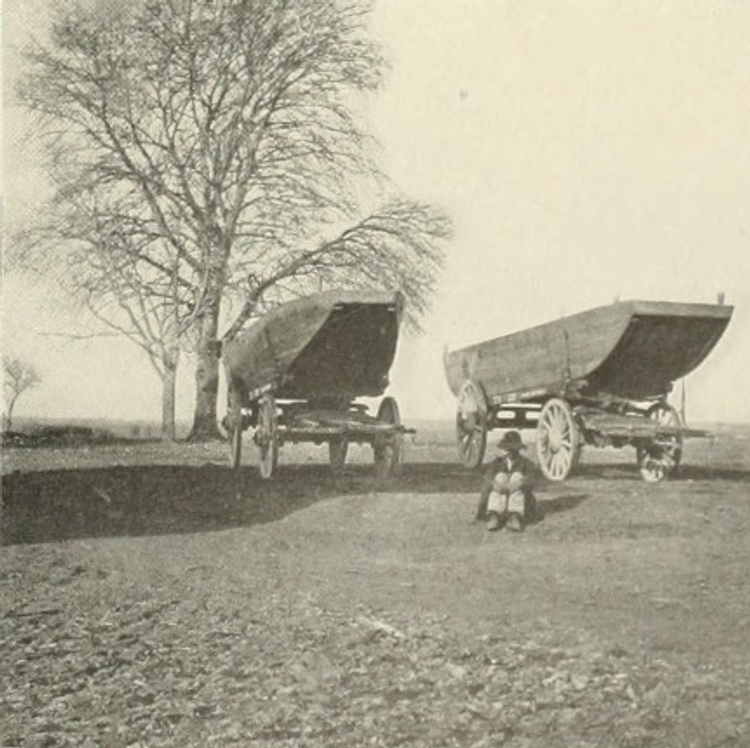
Union Army pontoon boats mobilized for deployment

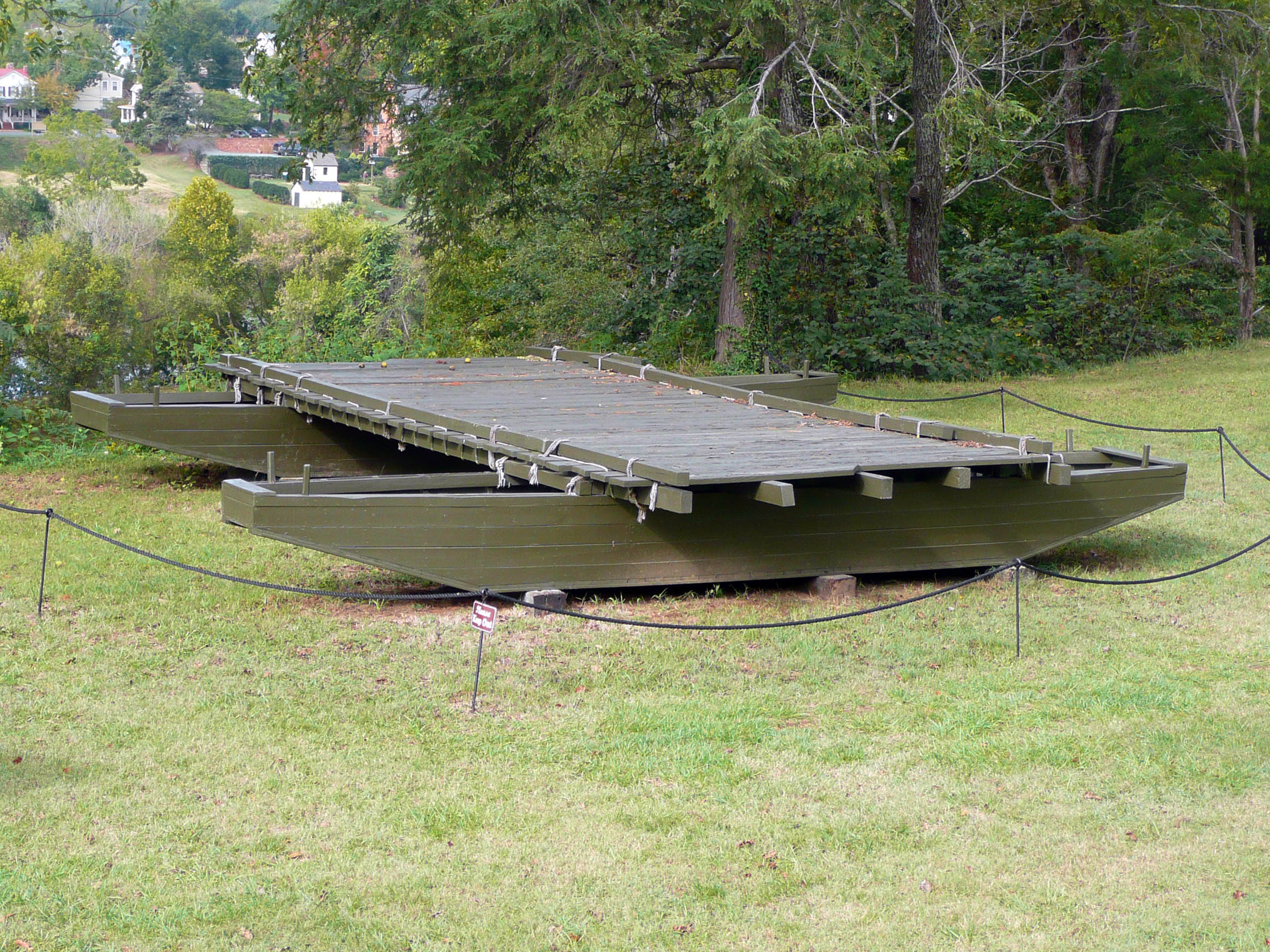
Model of a portion of the pontoon bridge built for the film Gods and Generals, displayed at the Fredericksburg and Spotsylvania National Military Park

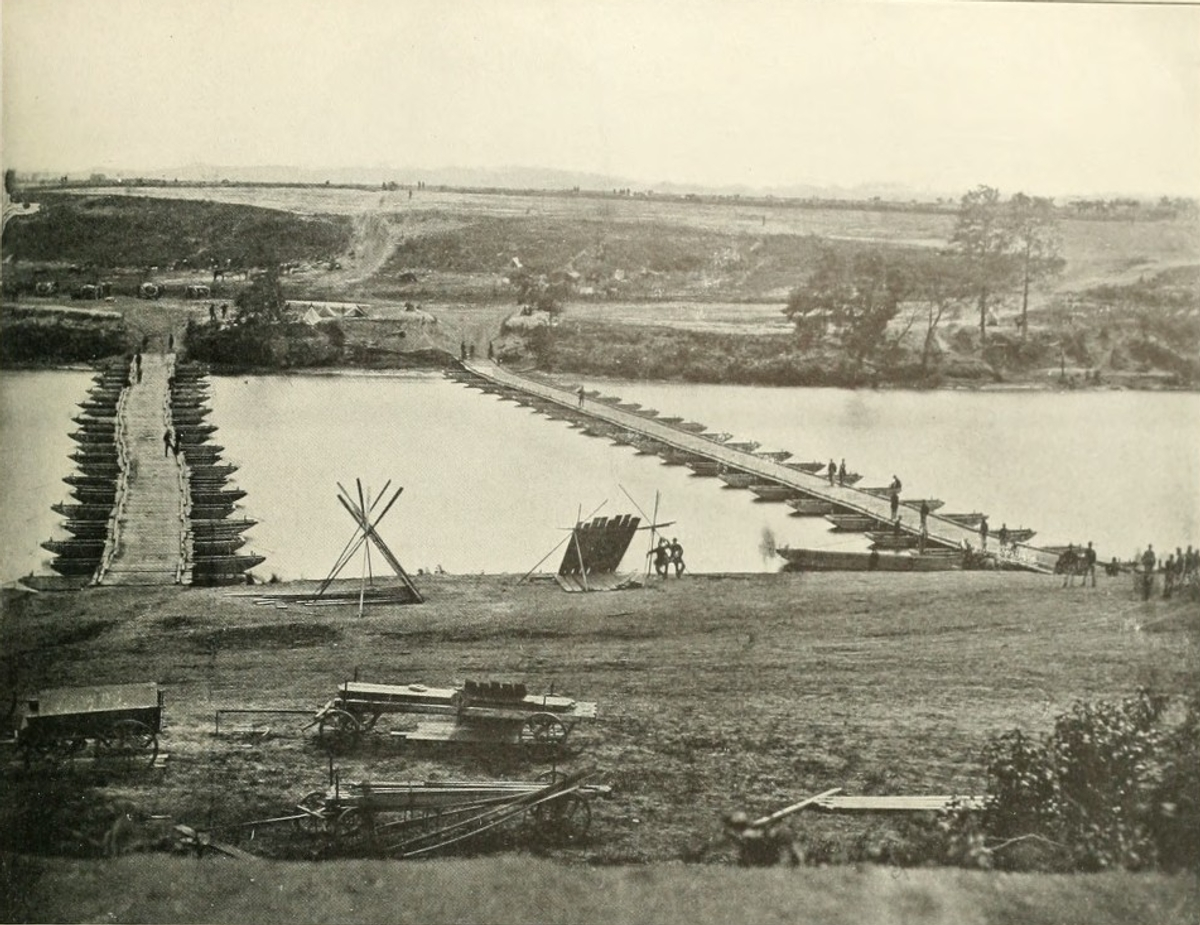
Pontoon bridges at Franklin's Crossing

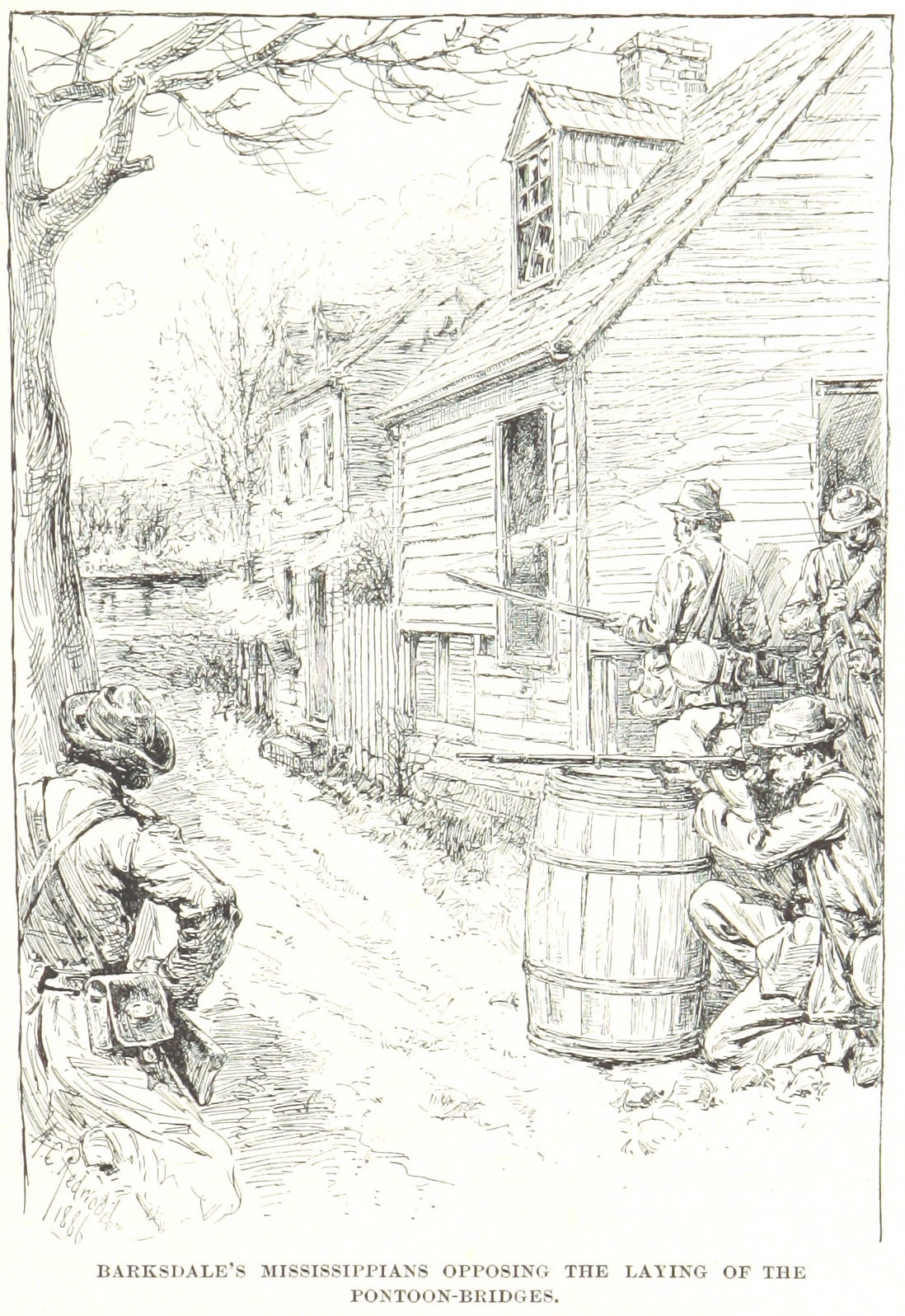
Barksdale's Mississippi brigade fires at the Union engineers

Union engineers began to assemble six pontoon bridges before dawn on December 11, two just north of the town center, a third on the southern end of town, and three farther south, near the confluence of the Rappahannock and Deep Run. The engineers constructing the bridge directly across from the city came under punishing fire from Confederate sharpshooters, primarily from the Mississippi brigade of Brig. Gen. William Barksdale, in command of the town defenses. Union artillery attempted to dislodge the sharpshooters, but their positions in the cellars of houses rendered the fire from 150 guns mostly ineffective. Eventually Burnside's artillery commander, Brig. Gen. Henry J. Hunt, convinced him to send infantry landing parties over in the pontoon boats to secure a small bridgehead and rout the sharpshooters. Col. Norman J. Hall volunteered his brigade for this assignment. Burnside suddenly turned reluctant, lamenting to Hall in front of his men that "the effort meant death to most of those who should undertake the voyage." When his men responded to Hall's request with three cheers, Burnside relented. At 3:00 p.m., the Union artillery began a preparatory bombardment and 135 infantrymen from the 7th Michigan and the 19th Massachusetts crowded into the small boats, and the 20th Massachusetts followed soon after. They crossed successfully and spread out in a skirmish line to clear the sharpshooters. Although some of the Confederates surrendered, fighting proceeded street by street through the town as the engineers completed the bridges. Sumner's Right Grand Division began crossing at 4:30 p.m., but the bulk of his men did not cross until December 12. Hooker's Center Grand Division crossed on December 13, using both the northern and southern bridges.

The clearing of the city buildings by Sumner's infantry and by artillery fire from across the river began the first major urban combat of both the war and American history. Union gunners sent more than 5,000 shells against the town and the ridges to the west. By nightfall, four brigades of Union troops occupied the town, which they looted with a fury that had not been seen in the war up to that point. This behavior enraged Lee, who compared their depredations with those of the ancient Vandals. The destruction also angered the Confederate troops, many of whom were native Virginians. Many on the Union side were also shocked by the destruction inflicted on Fredericksburg. Civilian casualties were unusually low given the widespread violence; George Rable estimates no more than four civilian deaths.

River crossings south of the city by Franklin's Left Grand Division were much less eventful. Both bridges were completed by 11:00 a.m. on December 11 while five batteries of Union artillery suppressed most sniper fire against the engineers. Franklin was ordered at 4:00 p.m. to cross his entire command, but only a single brigade was sent out before dark. Crossings resumed at dawn and were completed by 1:00 p.m. on December 12. Early on December 13, Jackson recalled his divisions under Jubal Early and D.H. Hill from down river positions to join his main defensive lines south of the city.

Burnside's verbal instructions on December 12 outlined a main attack by Franklin, supported by Hooker, on the southern flank, while Sumner made a secondary attack on the northern flank. His actual orders on December 13 were vague and confusing to his subordinates. At 5:00 p.m. on December 12, he made a cursory inspection of the southern flank, where Franklin and his subordinates pressed him to give definite orders for a morning attack by the grand division, so they would have adequate time to position their forces overnight. However, Burnside demurred and the order did not reach Franklin until 7:15 or 7:45 a.m. When it arrived, it was not as Franklin expected. Rather than ordering an attack by the entire grand division of almost 60,000 men, Franklin was to keep his men in position, but was to send "a division at least" to seize the high ground (Prospect Hill) around Hamilton's Crossing, Sumner was to send one division through the city and up Telegraph Road, and both flanks were to be prepared to commit their entire commands. Burnside was apparently expecting these weak attacks to intimidate Lee, causing him to withdraw. Franklin, who had originally advocated a vigorous assault, chose to interpret Burnside's order very conservatively. Brig. Gen. James A. Hardie, who delivered the order, did not ensure that Burnside's intentions were understood by Franklin, and map inaccuracies about the road network made those intentions unclear. Furthermore, Burnside's choice of the verb "to seize" was less forceful in 19th century military terminology than an order "to carry" the heights.

=== South of the city, December 13 ===
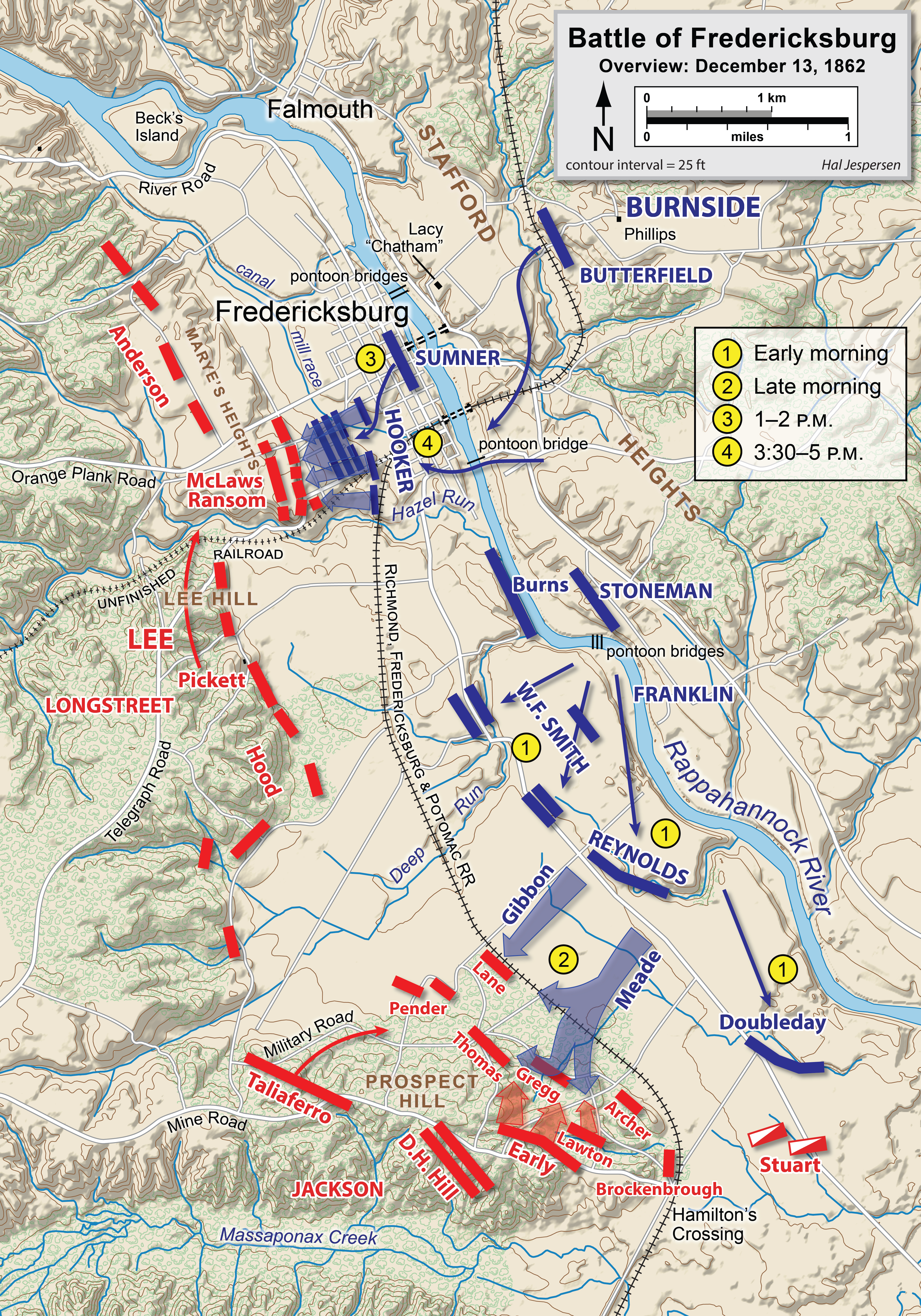
Overview of the battle, December 13, 1862

December 13 began cold and overcast. A dense fog blanketed the ground and made it impossible for the armies to see each other. Franklin ordered his I Corps commander, Maj. Gen. John F. Reynolds, to select a division for the attack. Reynolds chose his smallest division, about 4,500 men commanded by Maj. Gen. George G. Meade, and assigned Brig. Gen. John Gibbon's division to support Meade's attack. His reserve division, under Maj. Gen. Abner Doubleday, was to face south and protect the left flank between the Richmond Road and the river. Meade's division began moving out at 8:30 a.m., with Gibbon following behind. At around 10:30 a.m., the fog started lifting. They moved parallel to the river initially, turning right to face the Richmond Road, where they began to be struck by enfilading fire from the Virginia Horse Artillery under Major John Pelham. Pelham started with two cannons—a 12-pounder Napoleon smoothbore and a rifled Blakely—but continued with only one after the latter was disabled by counter-battery fire. J.E.B. Stuart sent word to Pelham that he should feel free to withdraw from his dangerous position at any time, to which Pelham responded, "Tell the General I can hold my ground." The Iron Brigade (formerly Gibbon's command, but now led by Brig. Gen. Solomon Meredith) was sent out to deal with the Confederate horse artillery. This action was mainly conducted by the 24th Michigan Infantry, a newly enlisted regiment that had joined the brigade in October. After about an hour, Pelham's ammunition began to run low and he withdrew. General Lee observed the action and commented about Pelham, age 24, "It is glorious to see such courage in one so young." The most prominent victim of Pelham's fire was Brig. Gen. George D. Bayard, a cavalry general mortally wounded by a shell while standing in reserve near Franklin's headquarters. Jackson's main artillery batteries had remained silent in the fog during this exchange, but the Union troops soon began to receive direct fire from Prospect Hill, principally five batteries directed by Lt. Col. Reuben Lindsay Walker, and Meade's attack was stalled about 600 yards from his initial objective for almost two hours by these combined artillery attacks.

The Union artillery fire was lifted as Meade's men moved forward around 1:00 p.m. Jackson's force of about 35,000 remained concealed on the wooded ridge to Meade's front. His formidable defensive line had an unforeseen flaw. In A.P. Hill's division's line, a triangular patch of the woods that extended beyond the railroad was swampy and covered with thick underbrush and the Confederates had left a 600-yard gap there between the brigades of Brig. Gens. James H. Lane and James J. Archer. Brig. Gen. Maxcy Gregg's brigade stood about a quarter mile behind the gap. Meade's 1st Brigade (Col. William Sinclair) entered the gap, climbed the railroad embankment, and turned right into the underbrush, striking Lane's brigade in the flank. Following immediately behind, his 3rd Brigade (Brig. Gen. Feger Jackson) turned left and hit Archer's flank. The 2nd Brigade (Col. Albert L. Magilton) came up in support and intermixed with the leading brigades. As the gap widened with pressure on the flanks, thousands of Meade's men reached the top of the ridge and ran into Gregg's brigade. Many of these Confederates had stacked arms while taking cover from Union artillery and were not expecting to be attacked at that moment, so were killed or captured unarmed. Gregg at first mistook the Union soldiers for fleeing Confederate troops and ordered his men not to fire on them. While he rode prominently in front of his lines, the partially deaf Gregg could not hear the approaching Federals or their bullets flying around him. In the confusion, a bullet struck his spine and fatally wounded him; he died two days later. Col. Daniel Hamilton of the 1st South Carolina assumed command, but Gregg's brigade was totally routed and was no longer an organized unit for the rest of the day. Archer meanwhile was being pressed hard on his left flank and sent word for Gregg to reinforce him, unaware that he had been shot and his brigade had disintegrated. The 19th Georgia's flag was captured by the adjutant of the 7th Pennsylvania Reserves; it was the only Confederate regimental flag captured and retained by the Army of the Potomac in the battle. The Georgians broke and ran. The 14th Tennessee resisted the onslaught for a time before also breaking; a sizable number of its men were taken prisoner. Archer frantically sent messages to the rear, calling on John Brockenbrough and Edmund Atkinson's brigades for help. With ammunition on both sides running low, hand-to-hand fighting ensued with soldiers stabbing at each other with bayonets and using muskets as clubs. Most of the regimental officers on both sides went down as well; on the Confederate side, the 1st Tennessee went through three commanders in a matter of minutes. Meade's 15 regiments also lost most of their officers, although Meade himself survived the battle unscathed despite having been exposed to heavy artillery fire.

Confederate reserves—the divisions of Brig. Gens. Jubal A. Early and William B. Taliaferro—moved into the fray from behind Gregg's original position. Inspired by their attack, regiments from Lane's and Archer's brigades rallied and formed a new defensive line in the gap. Now Meade's men were receiving fire from three sides and could not withstand the pressure. Feger Jackson attempted to flank a Confederate battery, but after his horse was shot and he began to lead on foot, he was shot in the head by a volley and his brigade fell back, leaderless (Col. Joseph W. Fisher soon replaced Jackson in command).

Additional maps
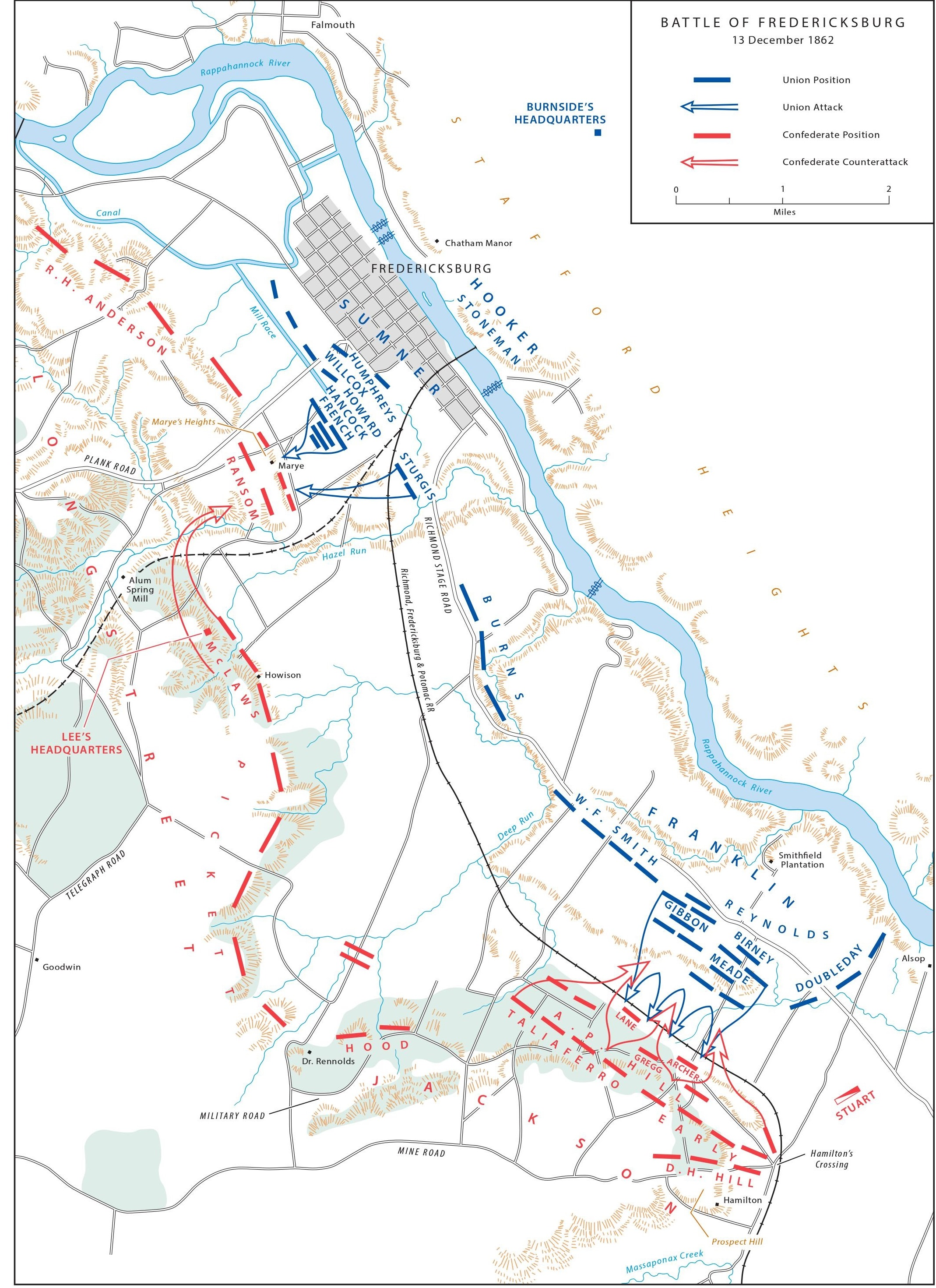
Overview of the battle, December 13, 1862 (additional map 1)

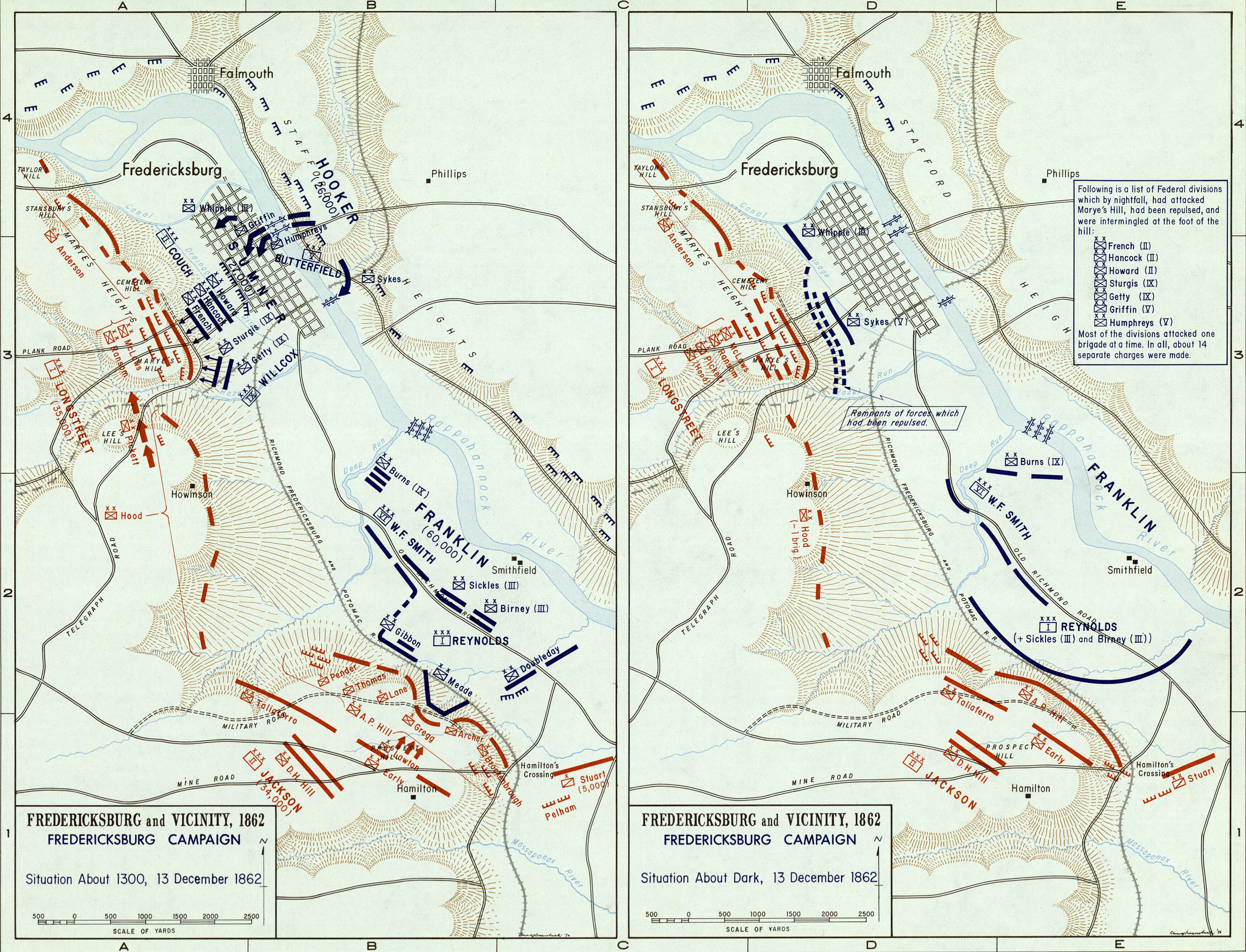
Overview of the battle, December 13, 1862 (additional map 2)

To Meade's right, Gibbon's division prepared to move forward at 1:00 p.m. Brig. Gen. Nelson Taylor proposed to Gibbon that they supplement Meade's assault with a bayonet charge against Lane's position. However, Gibbon stated that this would violate his orders, so Taylor's brigade did not move forward until 1:30 p.m. The attack did not have the benefit of a gap to exploit, nor did the Union soldiers have any wooded cover for their advance, so progress was slow under heavy fire from Lane's brigade and Confederate artillery. Immediately following Taylor was the brigade of Col. Peter Lyle, and the advance of the two brigades ground to a halt before they reached the railroad. Committing his reserve at 1:45 p.m., Gibbon sent forward his brigade under Col. Adrian R. Root, which moved through the survivors of the first two brigades, but they were soon brought to a halt as well. Eventually some of the Federals reached the crest of the ridge and had some success during hand-to-hand fighting—men on both sides had depleted their ammunition and resorted to bayonets and rifle butts, and even empty rifles with bayonets thrown like javelins—but they were forced to withdraw back across the railroad embankment along with Meade's men to their left. Gibbon's attack, despite heavy casualties, had failed to support Meade's temporary breakthrough and Gibbon himself was wounded when a shell fragment struck his right hand. Brig. Gen Nelson Taylor took over command of the division.

My God, General Reynolds, did they think my division could whip Lee's whole army?

— Maj. Gen. George G. Meade to Maj. Gen. John F. Reynolds, afternoon of December 13

It is well that war is so terrible, or we should grow too fond of it.

— Gen. Robert E. Lee, watching the carnage of the Confederate counterattack from the center of his line, a position now known as Lee's Hill

After the battle Meade complained that some of Gibbon's officers had not charged quickly enough. But his primary frustration was with Brig. Gen. David B. Birney, whose division of the III Corps had been designated to support the attack as well. Birney claimed that his men had been subjected to damaging artillery fire as they formed up, that he had not understood the importance of Meade's attack, and that Reynolds had not ordered his division forward. When Meade galloped to the rear to confront Birney with a string of fierce profanities that, in the words of one staff lieutenant, "almost makes the stones creep," he was finally able to order the brigadier forward under his own responsibility, but harbored resentment for weeks. By this time, however, it was too late to accomplish any further offensive action.

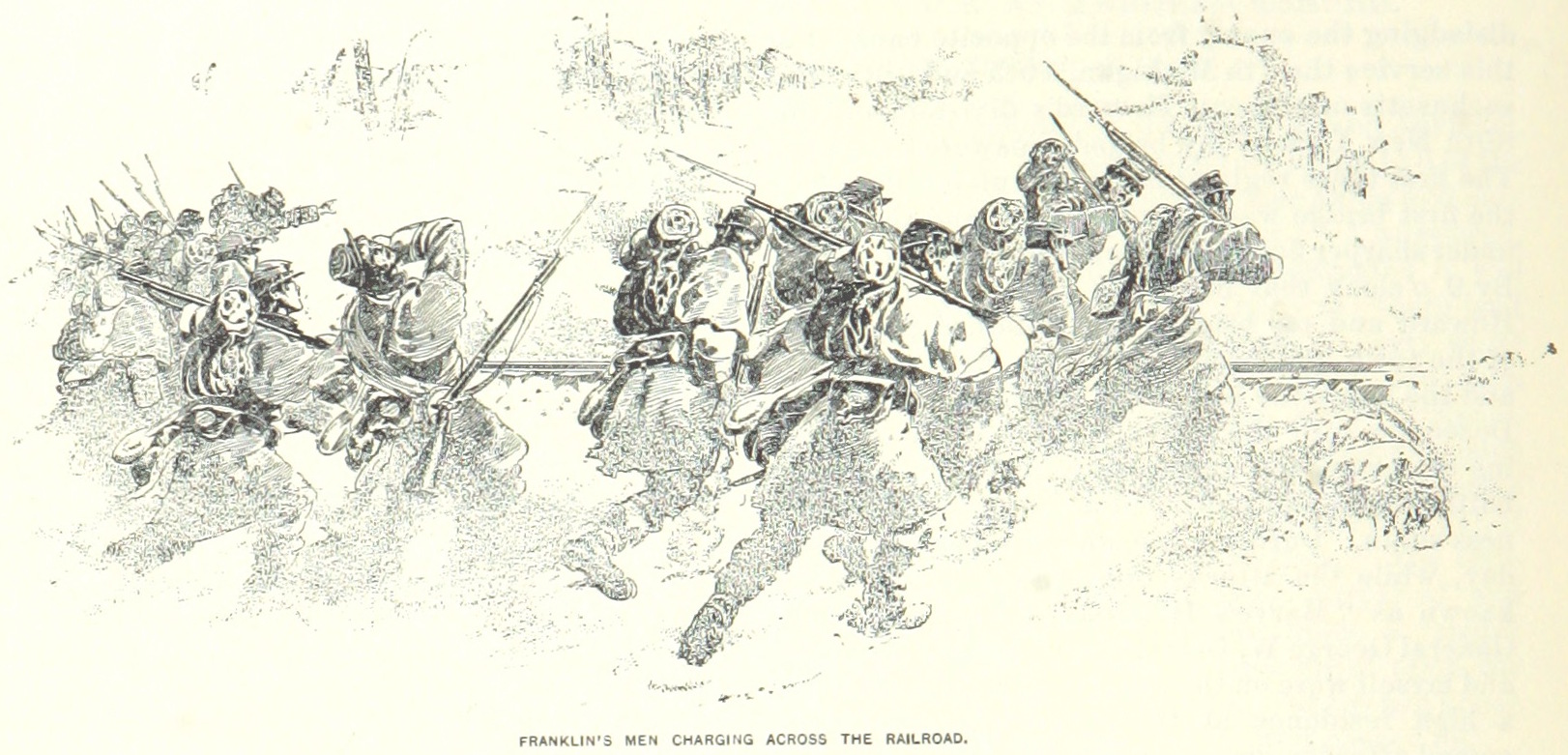
Part of Franklin's "Left Grand Division" charges across the railroad

Early's division began a counterattack, led initially by Col. Edmund N. Atkinson's Georgia brigade, which inspired the men from the brigades of Col. Robert Hoke, Brig. Gen. Archer, and Col. John M. Brockenbrough to charge forward out of the railroad ditches, driving Meade's men from the woods in a disorderly retreat, followed closely by Gibbon's. Early's orders to his brigades were to pursue as far as the railroad, but in the chaos many kept up the pressure over the open fields as far as the old Richmond Road. Union artillery crews proceeded to unleash a blast of close-range canister shot, firing as fast as they could load their guns. The Confederates were also struck by the leading brigade of Birney's belated advance, commanded by Brig. Gen. J. H. Hobart Ward. Birney followed up with the brigades of Brig. Gens. Hiram G. Berry and John C. Robinson, which broke the Rebel advance that had threatened to drive the Union into the river. Col. Atkinson was struck in the shoulder by canister shot and abandoned by his own brigade; Union soldiers later found and took him prisoner. Any further Confederate advance was deterred by the arrival of the III Corps division of Brig. Gen. Daniel E. Sickles on the right. General Burnside, who by this time was focused on his attacks on Marye's Heights, was dismayed that his left flank attack had not achieved the success he assumed earlier in the day. He ordered Franklin to "advance his right and front," but despite repeated entreaties, Franklin refused, claiming that all of his forces had been engaged. This was not true, however, as the VI Corps and Brig. Gen. Doubleday's division of the I Corps had been mostly idle, suffering only a few casualties from artillery fire while they waited in reserve. In mid-afternoon elements of the VI Corps advanced to Deep Run to probe Lee's center but were attacked by Brig. Gen Evander M. Law's brigade of Hood's division and repulsed. Most of the fighting was done by the 57th North Carolina, a green regiment in its first battle, which lost 250 men and six officers.

The Confederates withdrew back to the safety of the hills south of town. Stonewall Jackson considered mounting a resumed counterattack, but the Federal artillery and impending darkness changed his mind. A fortuitous Union breakthrough had been wasted because Franklin did not reinforce Meade's success with some of the 20,000 men standing in reserve. Neither Franklin nor Reynolds took any personal involvement in the battle, and were unavailable to their subordinates at the critical point. Franklin's losses were about 5,000 casualties in comparison to Stonewall Jackson's 3,400, demonstrating the ferocity of the fighting. Skirmishing and artillery duels continued until dark, but no additional major attacks took place, while the center of the battle moved north to Marye's Heights. Brig. Gen George D. Bayard, who commanded a cavalry brigade in the VI Corps, was struck in the leg by a shell fragment and died two days later.

As the fighting south of Fredericksburg died down, the air was filled with the screams of hundreds of wounded men and horses. Dry sage grass around them caught fire and burned many men alive.

=== Marye's Heights, December 13 ===
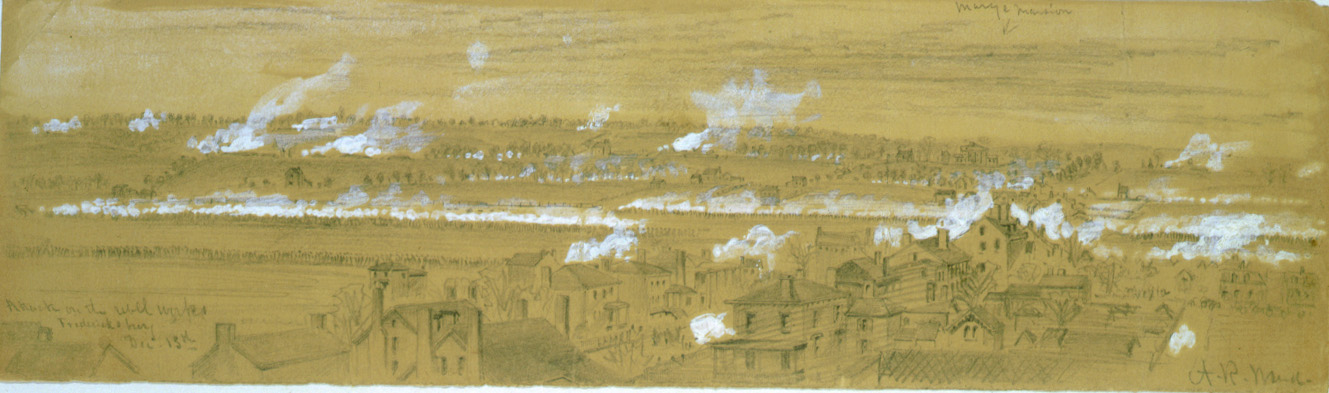
Attack on the Rebel Works, 1862 sketch by Alfred Waud

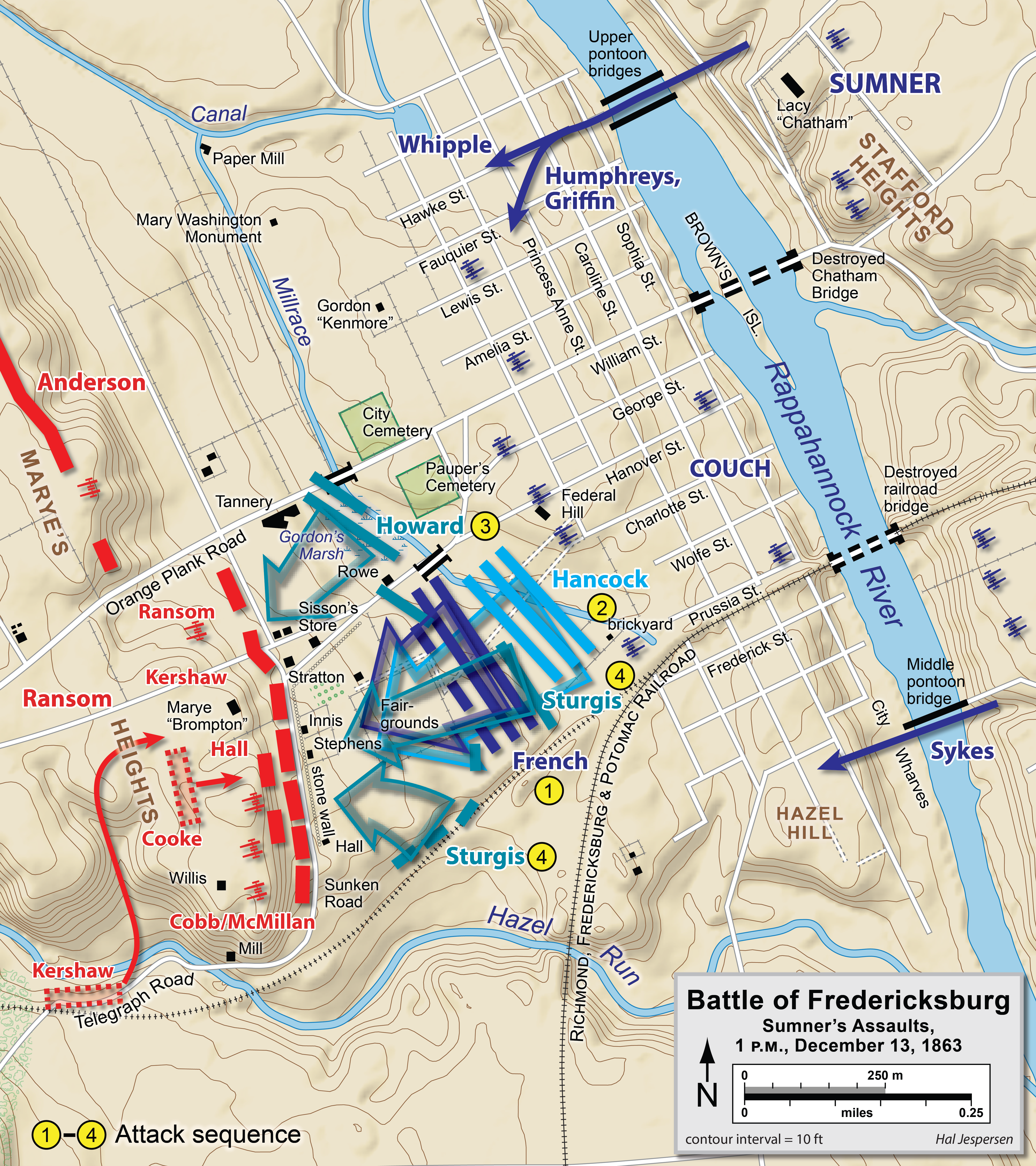
Sumner's assault, 1:00 p.m., December 13, 1862. The sequence of Union division attacks was French (II Corps), Hancock (II), Howard (II), and Sturgis (IX).

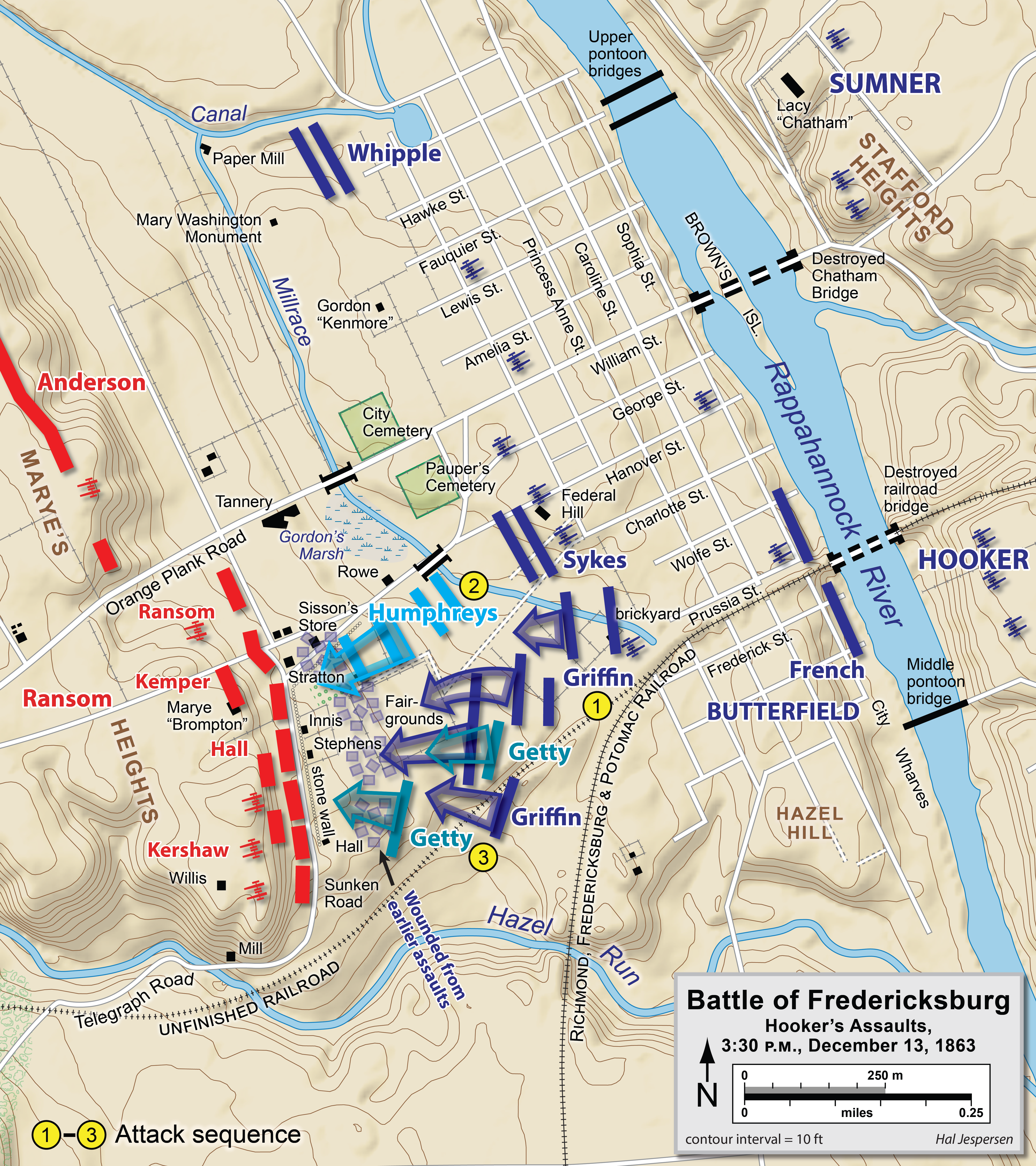
Hooker's assault, 3:30 p.m., December 13, 1862. The sequence of Union division attacks was Griffin (V Corps), Humphreys (V), and Getty (IX).

On the northern end of the battlefield, Brig. Gen. William H. French's division of the II Corps prepared to move forward, subjected to Confederate artillery fire that was descending on the fog-covered city of Fredericksburg. General Burnside's orders to Maj. Gen. Edwin V. Sumner, commander of the Right Grand Division, was to send "a division or more" to seize the high ground to the west of the city, assuming that his assault on the southern end of the Confederate line would be the decisive action of the battle. The avenue of approach was difficult—mostly open fields, but interrupted by scattered houses, fences, and gardens that would restrict the movement of battle lines. A canal stood about 200 yards west of the town, crossed by three narrow bridges, which would require the Union troops to funnel themselves into columns before proceeding. About 600 yards to the west of Fredericksburg was the low ridge known as Marye's Heights, rising 40–50 feet above the plain. (Although popularly known as Marye's Heights, the ridge was composed of several hills separated by ravines, from north to south: Taylor's Hill, Stansbury Hill, Marye's Hill, and Willis Hill.) Near the crest of the portion of the ridge comprising Marye's Hill and Willis Hill, a narrow lane in a slight cut—the Telegraph Road, known after the battle as the Sunken Road—was protected by a 4-foot stone wall, enhanced in places with log breastworks and abatis, making it a perfect infantry defensive position. Confederate Maj. Gen. Lafayette McLaws initially had about 2,000 men on the front line of Marye's Heights and there were an additional 7,000 men in reserve on the crest and behind the ridge. Massed artillery provided almost uninterrupted coverage of the plain below. General Longstreet had been assured by his artillery commander, Lt. Col. Edward Porter Alexander, "General, we cover that ground now so well that we will comb it as with a fine-tooth comb. A chicken could not live on that field when we open on it."

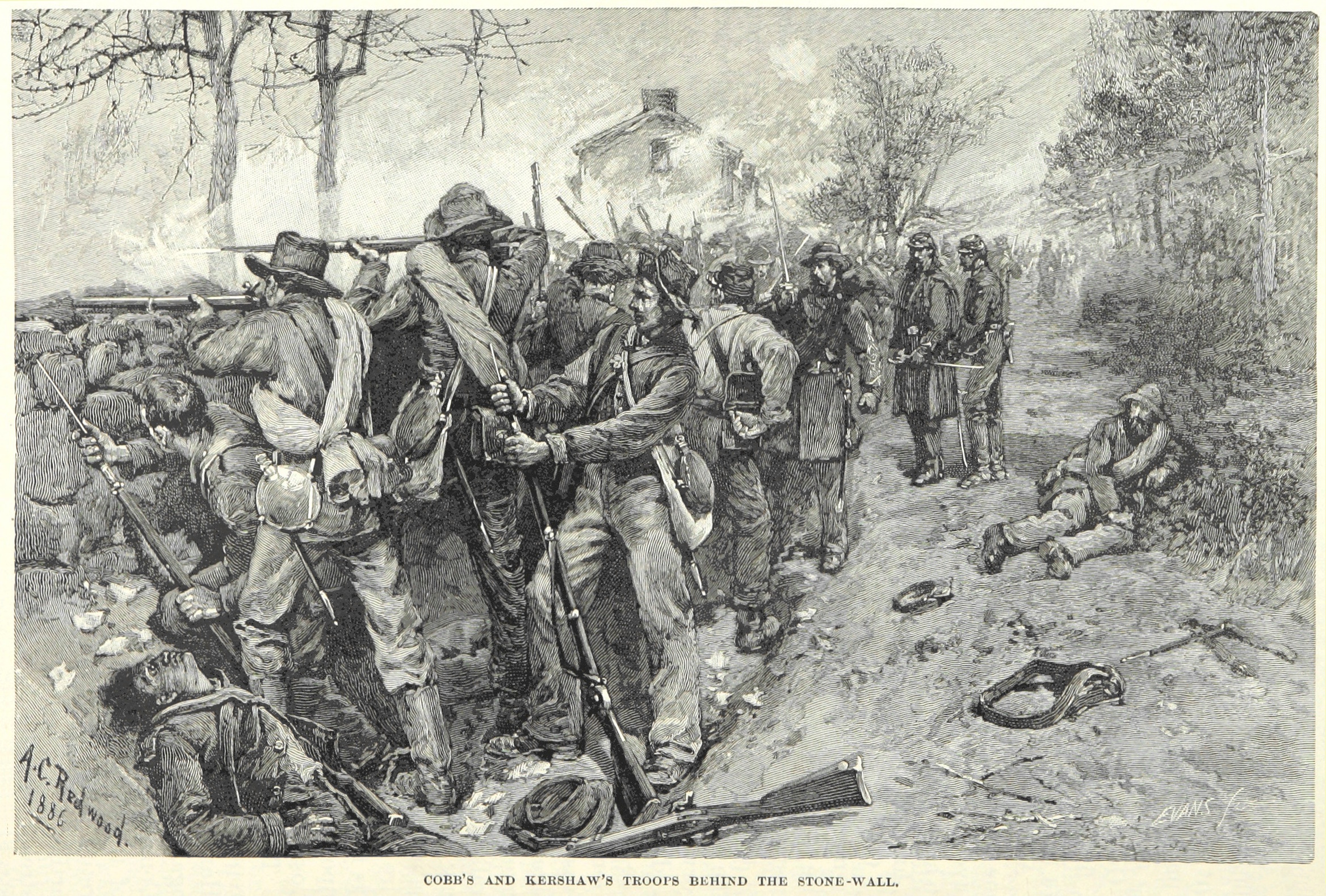
The Confederate troops behind the stone wall

The fog lifted from the town around 10 a.m. and Sumner gave his order to advance an hour later. French's brigade under Brig. Gen. Nathan Kimball began to move around noon. They advanced slowly through heavy artillery fire, crossed the canal in columns over the narrow bridges, and formed in line, with fixed bayonets, behind the protection of a shallow bluff. In perfect line of battle, they advanced up the muddy slope until they were cut down at about 125 yards from the stone wall by repeated rifle volleys. Some soldiers were able to get as close as 40 yards, but having suffered severe casualties from both the artillery and infantry fire, the survivors clung to the ground. Kimball was severely wounded during the assault, and his brigade suffered 25% casualties. French's brigades under Col. John W. Andrews and Col. Oliver H. Palmer followed, with casualty rates of almost 50%.

Sumner's original order called for the division of Brig. Gen. Winfield S. Hancock to support French, and Hancock sent forward his brigade under Col. Samuel K. Zook behind Palmer's. They met a similar fate. Next was his Irish Brigade under Brig. Gen. Thomas F. Meagher who, equipped with outdated Springfield muskets, could not deliver an effective volley until within a hundred yards of the enemy. Of the 1,200 Irishmen who made the charge, 545 were killed or wounded. Hancock's final brigade was led by Brig. Gen. John C. Caldwell. Leading his two regiments on the left, Col. Nelson A. Miles suggested to Caldwell that the practice of marching in formation, firing, and stopping to reload, made the Union soldiers easy targets, and that a concerted bayonet charge might be effective in carrying the works. Caldwell denied permission. Miles was struck by a bullet in the throat as he led his men to within 40 yards of the wall, where they were pinned down as their predecessors had been. Caldwell himself was soon struck by two bullets and put out of action.

The commander of the II Corps, Maj. Gen. Darius N. Couch, was dismayed at the carnage wrought upon his two divisions in the hour of fighting and, like Col. Miles, realized that the tactics were not working. He first considered a massive bayonet charge to overwhelm the defenders, but as he surveyed the front, he quickly realized that French's and Hancock's divisions were in no shape to move forward again. He next planned for his final division, commanded by Maj. Gen. Oliver O. Howard, to swing to the right and attempt to envelop the Confederate left, but upon receiving urgent requests for help from French and Hancock, he sent Howard's men over and around the fallen troops instead. The brigade of Col. Joshua Owen went in first, reinforced by Col. Norman J. Hall's brigade, and then two regiments of Brig. Gen. Alfred Sully's brigade. The other corps in Sumner's Right Grand Division was the IX Corps, and he sent in one of its divisions under Brig. Gen. Samuel Sturgis. After two hours of desperate fighting, four Union divisions had failed in the mission Burnside had originally assigned to one. Casualties were heavy: II Corps losses for the afternoon were 4,114, Sturgis's division 1,011.

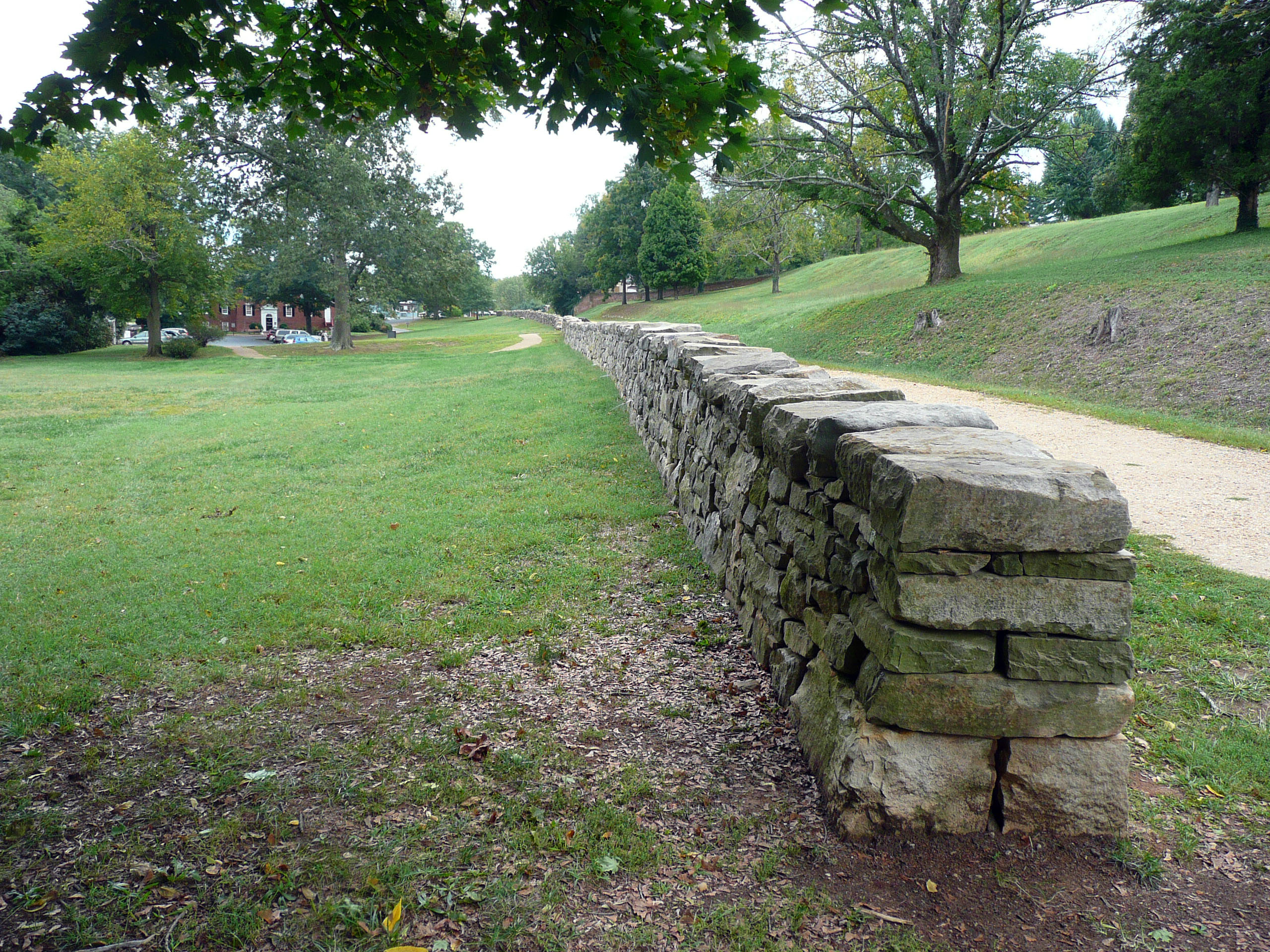
The sunken road at Marye's Heights in 2010. Approximately 3,000 Georgians under Thomas R. R. Cobb were lined up in multiple ranks behind the stone wall, and another 3,000 were atop the slope behind it, along with their artillery.

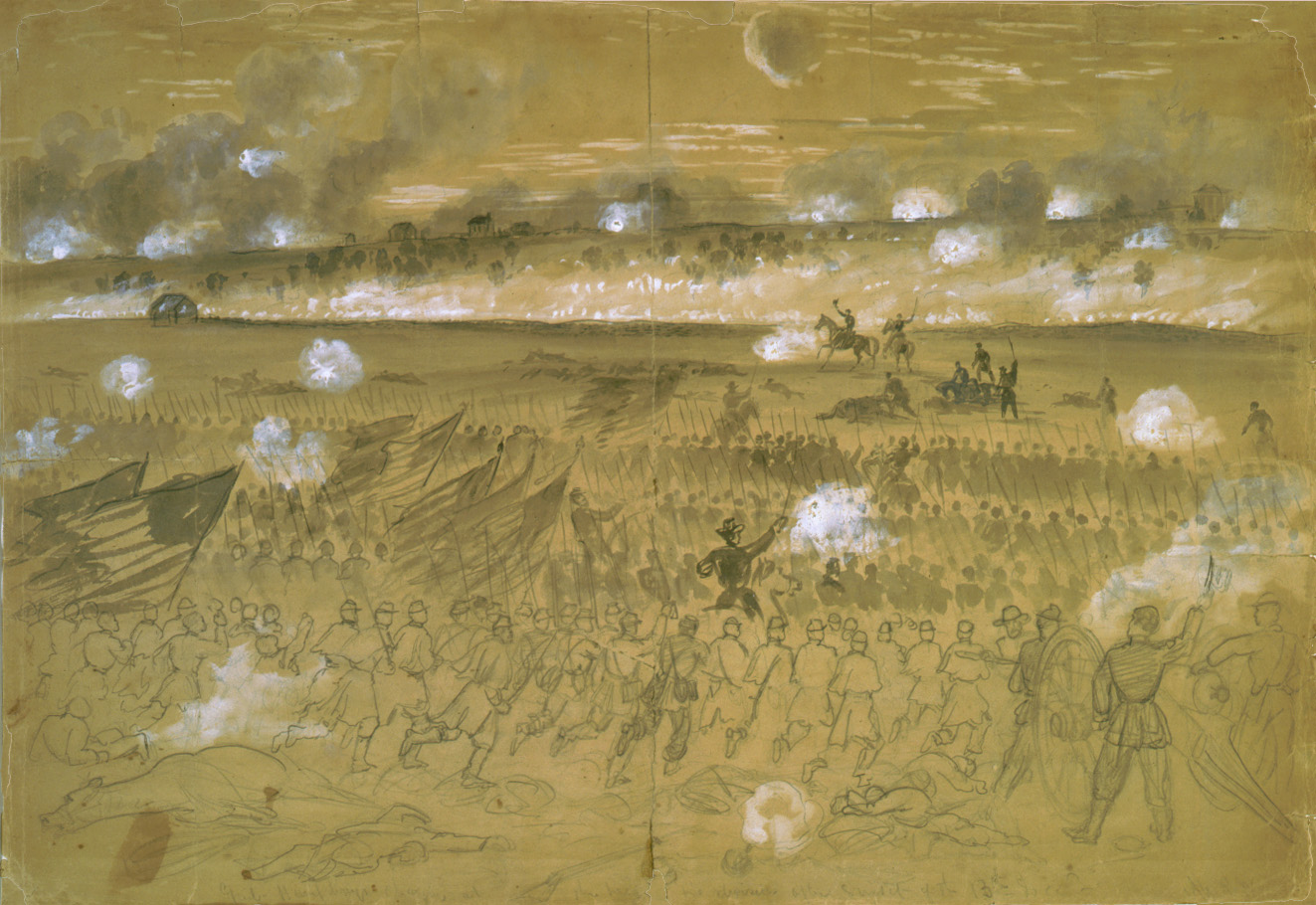
Genl. Humphreys charging at the head of his division after sunset of Dec 13, 1862 sketch by Alfred Waud

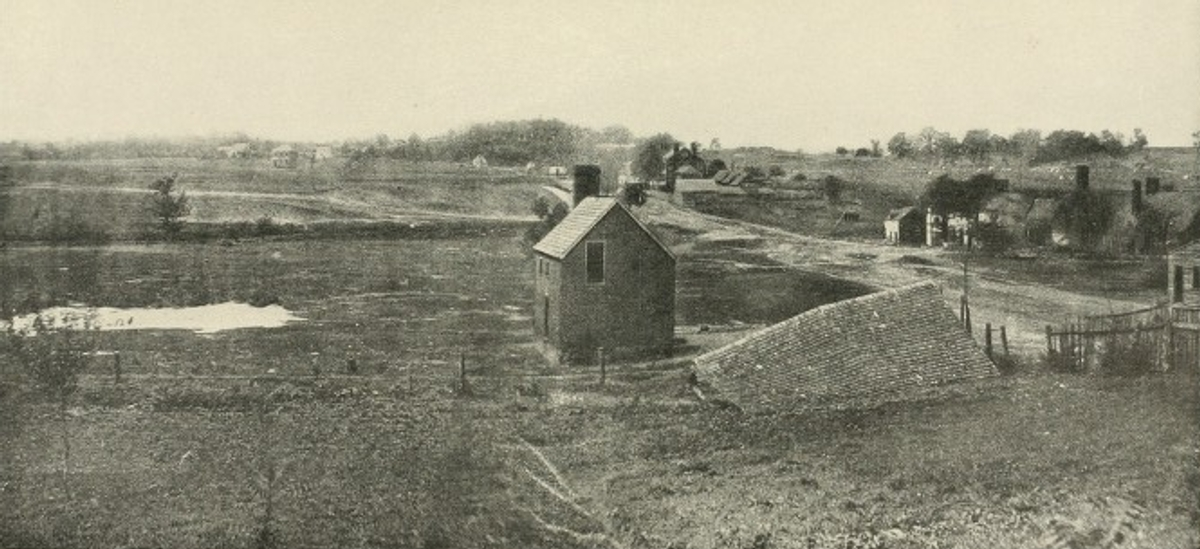
Western view from Fredericksburg down Telegraph Road with Marye's Heights visible in the distant center. The Union dead were buried in at least in 4 burial trenches in the fields at left and also in the ruined structure in the foreground

While the Union Army paused, Longstreet reinforced his line so that there were four ranks of infantrymen behind the stone wall. Brig. Gen. Thomas R. R. Cobb of Georgia, who had commanded the key sector of the line, was mortally wounded by an exploding artillery shell and was replaced by Brig. Gen. Joseph B. Kershaw. General Lee expressed concerns to Longstreet about the massing troops breaking his line, but Longstreet assured his commander, "General, if you put every man on the other side of the Potomac on that field to approach me over the same line, and give me plenty of ammunition, I will kill them all before they reach my line."

By mid-afternoon, Burnside had failed on both flanks to make progress against the Confederates. Rather than reconsidering his approach in the face of heavy casualties, he stubbornly decided to continue on the same path. He sent orders to Franklin to renew the assault on the left (which, as described earlier, the Left Grand Division commander ignored) and ordered his Center Grand Division, commanded by Maj. Gen. Hooker, to cross the Rappahannock into Fredericksburg and continue the attack on Marye's Heights. Hooker performed a personal reconnaissance (something that neither Burnside nor Sumner had done, both remaining east of the river during the failed assaults) and returned to Burnside's headquarters to advise against the attack.

Brig. Gen. Daniel Butterfield, commanding Hooker's V Corps, while waiting for Hooker to return from his conference with Burnside, sent his division under Brig. Gen. Charles Griffin to relieve Sturgis's men. By this time, Maj. Gen. George Pickett's Confederate division and one of Maj. Gen. John Bell Hood's brigades had marched north to reinforce Marye's Heights. Griffin smashed his three brigades against the Confederate position one by one. Also concerned about Sturgis, Couch sent the six guns of Capt. John G. Hazard's Battery B, 1st Rhode Island Light Artillery, to within 150 yards of the Confederate line. They were hit hard by Confederate sharpshooter and artillery fire and provided no effective relief to Sturgis.

A soldier in Hancock's division reported movement in the Confederate line that led some to believe that the enemy might be retreating. Despite the unlikeliness of this supposition, the V Corps division of Brig. Gen. Andrew A. Humphreys, two brigades of green nine month regiments, was ordered to attack and capitalize on the situation. Humphreys led his first brigade on horseback, with his men moving over and around fallen troops with fixed bayonets and unloaded rifles; some of the fallen men clutched at the passing pant legs, urging their comrades not to go forward, causing the brigade to become disorganized in their advance. The charge reached to within 50 yards before being cut down by concentrated rifle fire. Brig. Gen. George Sykes was ordered to move forward with his V Corps regular army division to support Humphreys's retreat, but his men were caught in a crossfire and pinned down. In the confusion, the horse of Brig. Gen. Abram S. Piatt stumbled and the general's back was seriously injured.

By 4:00 p.m., Hooker had returned from his meeting with Burnside, having failed to convince the commanding general to abandon the attacks. While Humphreys was still attacking, Hooker reluctantly ordered the IX Corps division of Brig. Gen. George W. Getty to attack as well, but this time to the leftmost portion of Marye's Heights, Willis Hill. Col. Rush Hawkins's brigade, followed by Col. Edward Harland's brigade, moved along an unfinished railroad line just north of Hazel Run, approaching close to the Confederate line without detection in the gathering twilight, but they were eventually detected, fired on, and repulsed.

Seven Union divisions had been sent in, generally one brigade at a time, for a total of fourteen individual charges, all of which failed, costing from 6,000 to 8,000 casualties. A Union burial party found a total of 918 dead, many of them stripped naked by Confederates who had come down during the night to help themselves to their shoes and uniforms. Confederate losses at Marye's Heights totaled around 1,200. The falling of darkness and the pleas of Burnside's subordinates were enough to put an end to the attacks. Longstreet later wrote, "The charges had been desperate and bloody, but utterly hopeless." Hancock's division had taken the heaviest losses with 2,032 casualties, the most suffered by any Union division during the battle. Thousands of Union soldiers spent the cold December night on the fields leading to the heights, unable to move or assist the wounded because of Confederate fire. That night, Burnside attempted to blame his subordinates for the disastrous attacks, but they argued that it was entirely his fault and no one else's.

=== Lull and withdrawal, December 14–15 ===
During a dinner meeting the evening of December 13, Burnside dramatically announced that he would personally lead his old IX Corps in one final attack on Marye's Heights, but his generals talked him out of it the following morning. The armies remained in position throughout the day on December 14. That afternoon, Burnside asked Lee for a truce to attend to his wounded, which the latter granted. The next day the Federal forces retreated across the river, and the campaign came to an end. Burnside's generals had opposed retreating and recommended holding onto the town in preparation for making a future thrust elsewhere, but he refused their suggestions.

Testament to the extent of the carnage and suffering during the battle was the story of Richard Rowland Kirkland, a Confederate Army sergeant with Company G, 2nd South Carolina Volunteer Infantry. Stationed at the stone wall by the sunken road below Marye's Heights, Kirkland had a close up view to the suffering and like so many others was appalled at the cries for help of the Union wounded throughout the cold winter night of December 13, 1862. After obtaining permission from his commander, Brig. Gen. Joseph B. Kershaw, Kirkland gathered canteens and in broad daylight, without the benefit of a cease fire or a flag of truce (refused by Kershaw), provided water to numerous Union wounded lying on the field of battle. Union soldiers held their fire as it was obvious what Kirkland's intent was. Kirkland was nicknamed the "Angel of Marye's Heights" for these actions, and is memorialized with a statue by Felix de Weldon on the Fredericksburg and Spotsylvania National Military Park where he carried out his actions. Details of this story (first recorded in 1880) conflict with multiple after-action reports and may have been embellished and personalized for effect.

On the night of December 14, the Aurora Borealis made an appearance unusual for that latitude. One witness described that "the wonderful spectacle of the Aurora Borealis was seen in the Gulf States. The whole sky was a ruddy glow as if from an enormous conflagration, but marked by the darting rays peculiar to the Northern light." The event was noted in the diaries and letters of many soldiers at Fredericksburg, such as John W. Thompson, Jr., who wrote "Louisiana sent those famous cosmopolitan Zouaves called the Louisiana Tigers, and there were Florida troops who, undismayed in fire, stampeded the night after Fredericksburg, when the Aurora Borealis snapped and crackled over that field of the frozen dead hard by the Rappahannock ..."

== Aftermath ==
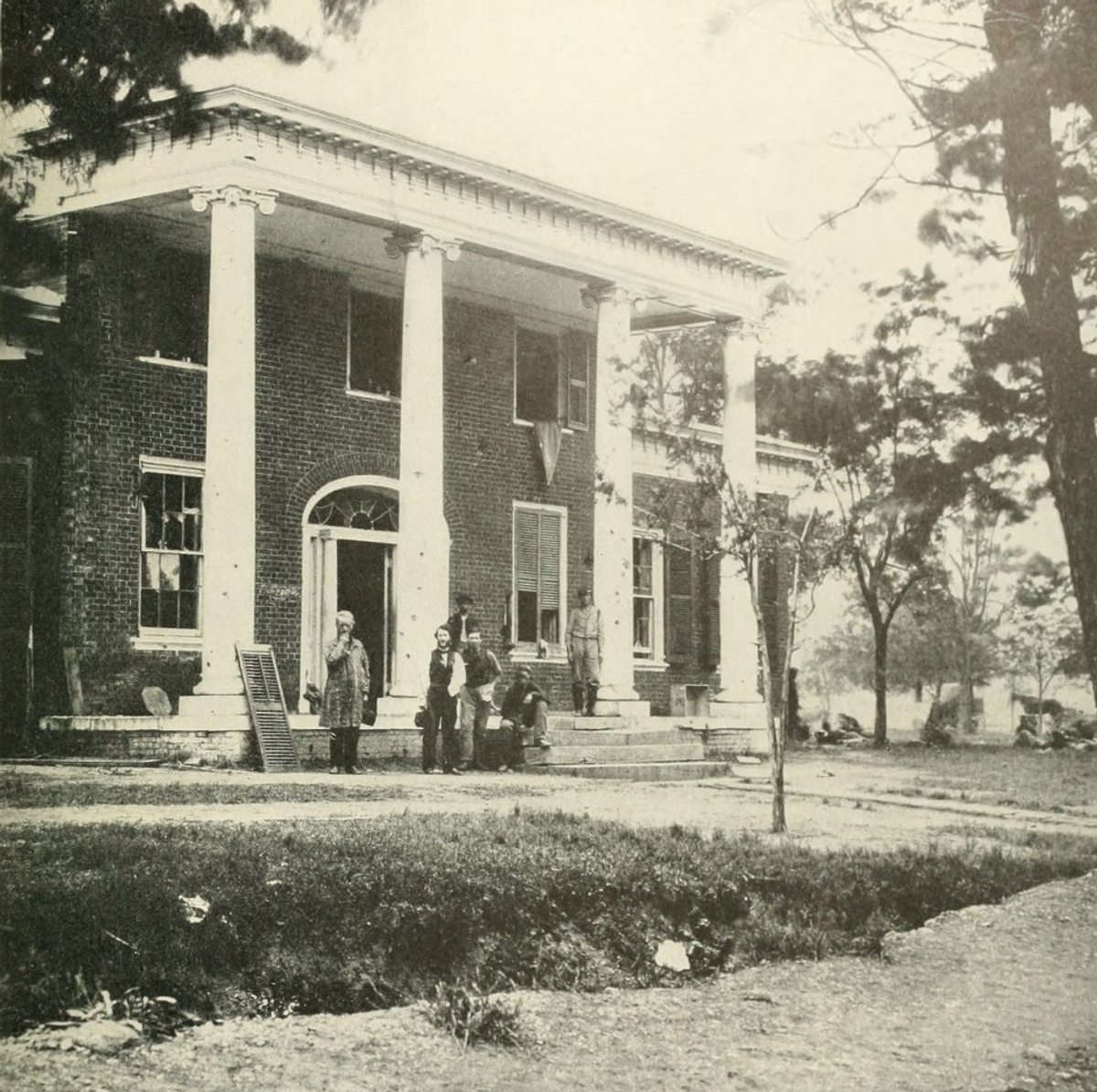
Marye's House upon Marye's Heights was the center of the Confederate position during the battle. Confederate troop encampments are visible to the right

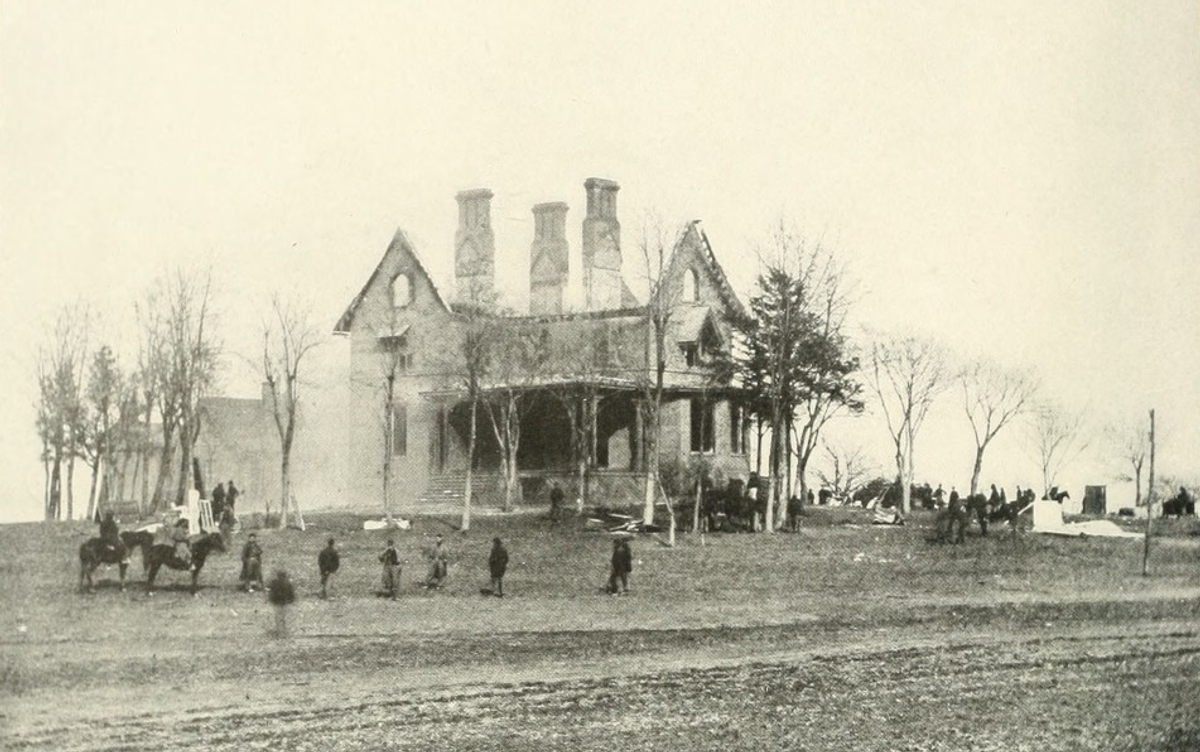
Burnside's headquarters at Phillips House during the battle

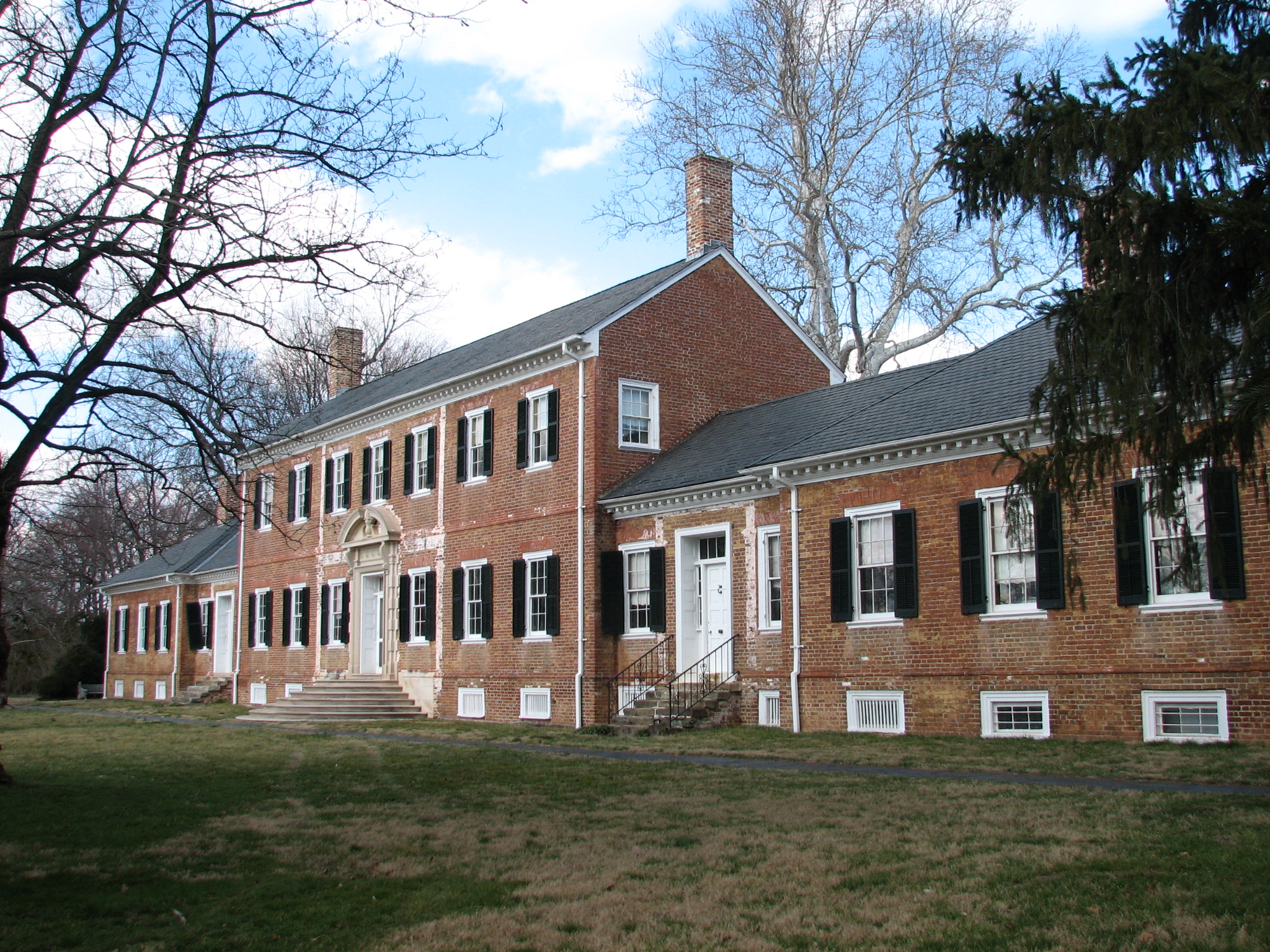
Sumner's headquarters, Chatham Manor, on Stafford Heights; Burnside observed the battle primarily from this location

=== Casualties ===
Senior officer casualties
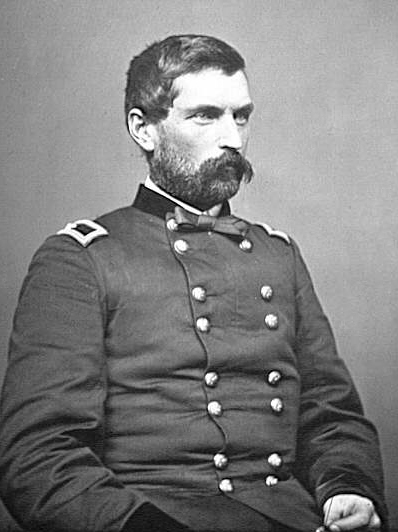
Brig. Gen.
John Gibbon, wounded

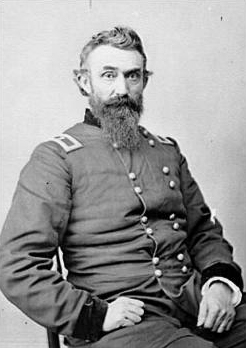
Brig. Gen.
Nathan Kimball, wounded

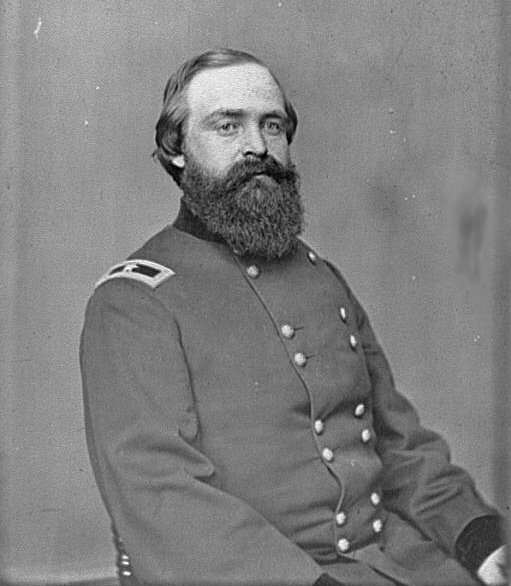
Brig. Gen.
John C. Caldwell, wounded

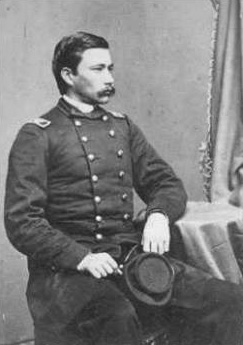
Brig. Gen.
George D. Bayard, killed

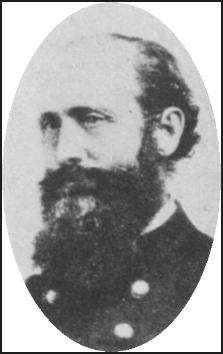
Brig. Gen.
Conrad F. Jackson, killed

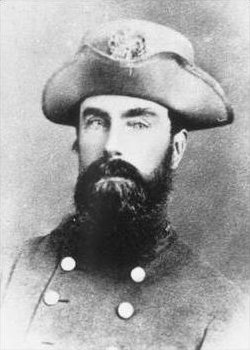
Brig. Gen.
Maxcy Gregg, mortally wounded

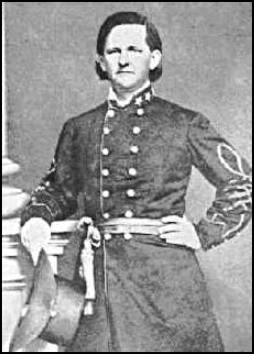
Brig. Gen.
Thomas R. R. Cobb, mortally wounded

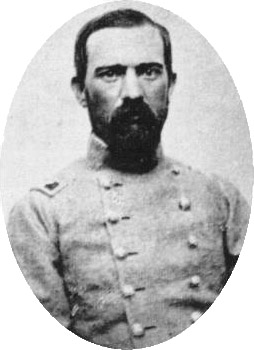
Brig. Gen.
William D. Pender, wounded

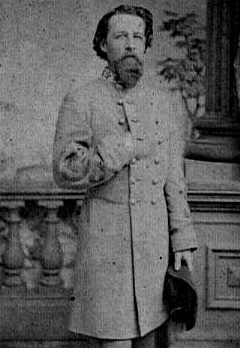
Brig. Gen.
John R. Cooke, wounded

The Union army suffered 12,653 casualties (1,284 killed, 9,600 wounded, 1,769 captured/missing). Two Union generals were mortally wounded: Brig. Gens. George D. Bayard and Conrad F. Jackson. The Confederate army lost 5,377 (608 killed, 4,116 wounded, 653 captured/missing), most of them in the early fighting on Jackson's front. Confederate Brig. Gens. Maxcy Gregg, T. R. R. Cobb, and William Dorsey Pender were all wounded; Cobb and Gregg mortally. The casualties sustained by each army showed clearly how disastrous the Union army's tactics were. Although the fighting on the southern flank produced roughly equal casualties (about 4,000 Confederate, 5,000 Union), the northern flank was completely lopsided, with about eight Union casualties for each Confederate. Burnside's men had suffered considerably more in the attack originally meant as a diversion than in his main effort. Over half the Confederate army had not even participated in the battle at all.

=== Confederate reaction ===
The South erupted in jubilation over its great victory. The Richmond Examiner described it as a "stunning defeat to the invader, a splendid victory to the defender of the sacred soil." General Lee, normally reserved, was described by the Charleston Mercury as "jubilant, almost off-balance, and seemingly desirous of embracing everyone who calls on him." The newspaper also exclaimed, "General Lee knows his business and the army has yet known no such word as fail."

However, Lee was not as pleased as the rest of the South. He later wrote, "At Fredericksburg we gained a battle, inflicting very severe loss on the enemy in men and material; our people were greatly elated—I was much depressed. We had really accomplished nothing; we had not gained a foot of ground, and I knew the enemy could easily replace the men he had lost, and the loss of material was, if anything, rather beneficial to him—as it gave an opportunity to contractors to make money."

=== Union reaction ===
Reactions were opposite in the North, and both the Army and President Lincoln came under strong attacks from politicians and the press. The Cincinnati Commercial noted, "It can hardly be in human nature for men to show more valor or generals to manifest less judgment, than were perceptible on our side that day." Senator Zachariah Chandler, a Radical Republican, wrote, "The President is a weak man, too weak for the occasion, and those fool or traitor generals are wasting time and yet more precious blood in indecisive battles and delays." Pennsylvania Governor Andrew Curtin visited the White House after a trip to the battlefield. He told the president, "It was not a battle, it was a butchery." Curtin reported that the president was "heart-broken at the recital, and soon reached a state of nervous excitement bordering on insanity." Lincoln himself wrote, "If there is a worse place than hell, I am in it." The situation in the West was equally dismal with Ulysses Grant's Army of the Tennessee bogged down in Mississippi in front of the seemingly unassailable city of Vicksburg while William Rosecrans's Army of the Cumberland had fought Braxton Bragg's Army of Tennessee to a bloody stalemate at the Battle of Stones River, which went into the books as a victory as Bragg retreated afterward and left the Union army in possession of the battlefield, but at a cost of over 13,000 casualties and mangling both armies so badly that neither was able to move again until the following summer. Burnside was relieved of command a month later, after an attempt to purge some of his subordinates from the Army and the humiliating failure of his "Mud March" in January.

== Battlefield preservation ==
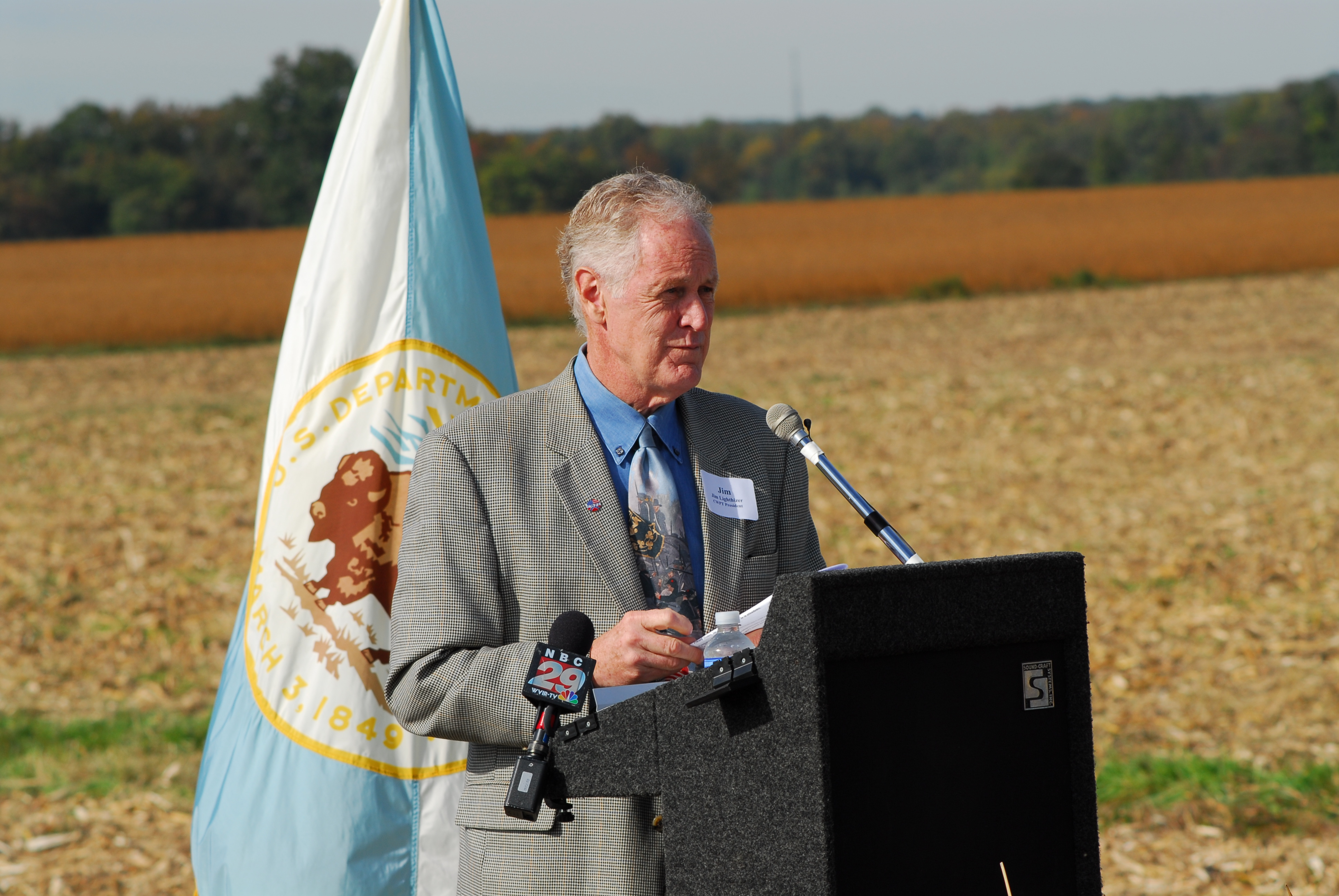
Civil War Trust President Jim Lighthizer at Slaughter Pen Farm

- Fredericksburg and Spotsylvania County Battlefields Memorial National Military Park
- U.S. National Register of Historic Places
- U.S. National Military Park
- Virginia Landmarks Register
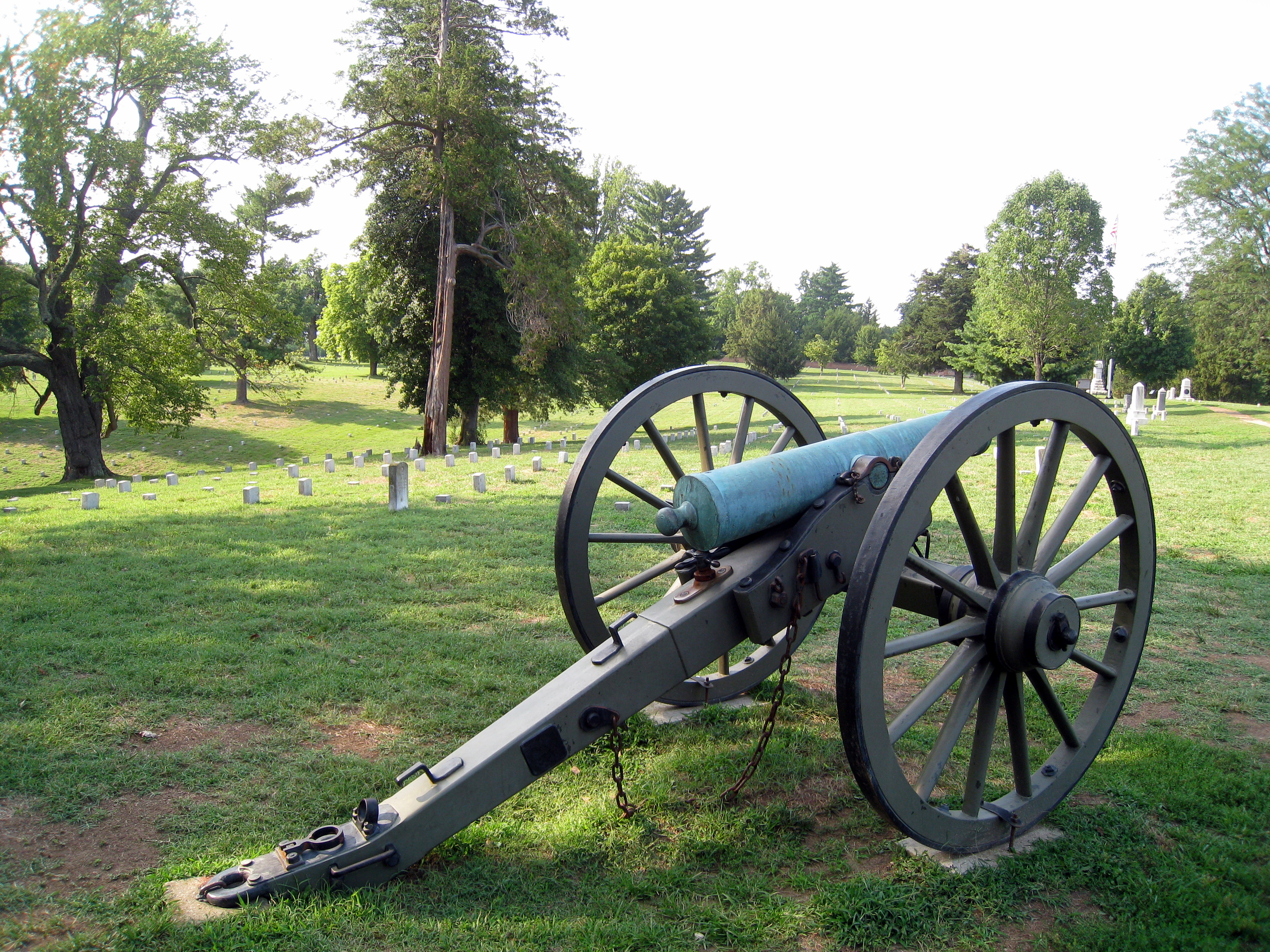
- A piece of artillery forming part of "Longstreet's Line" on Marye's Heights during the Battle of Fredericksburg
- Area: 4,601.1 acres (1,862 ha)
- NRHP reference No.: 66000046
- VLR No.: 111-0147

Significant dates
- Added to NRHP: October 15, 1966
- Designated VLR: January 16, 1973

The Fredericksburg and Spotsylvania National Military Park was established in 1927 under the War Department and transferred to the National Park Service in 1933. It consists of more than 8,300 acres that cover parts of four Civil War battlefields – Fredericksburg, Spotsylvania Court House, The Wilderness and Chancellorsville.

In March 2003, the Civil War Trust (a division of the American Battlefield Trust) announced the beginning of a $12 million national campaign to preserve the historic Slaughter Pen Farm, a key part of the Fredericksburg battlefield. The 208-acre (0.84 km^{2}) farm, known locally as the Pierson Tract, was the scene of bloody struggle on December 13, 1862. Over this ground Federal troops under Maj. Gen. George Meade and Brig. Gen. John Gibbon launched their assault against Lt. Gen. Thomas "Stonewall" Jackson's Confederates holding the southern portion of the Army of Northern Virginia's line at Fredericksburg. Despite suffering enormous casualties the Federal troops under Meade were able to temporarily penetrate the Confederate line and for a time represented the North's best chance of winning the Battle of Fredericksburg. The fighting on this southern portion of the battlefield, later named the Slaughter Pen, produced 5,000 casualties and five Medal of Honor recipients.

The Slaughter Pen Farm was considered to be the largest remaining unprotected part of the Fredericksburg battlefield. It is also the only place on the battlefield where a visitor can still follow the Union assault of December 13 from beginning to end. Nearly all the other land associated with Union attacks at Fredericksburg—either on the southern end of the battlefield or in front of Marye's Heights—has been degraded by development. The $12 million acquisition of the Slaughter Pen Farm at the Fredericksburg battlefield has been called the most ambitious nonprofit battlefield acquisition in American history.

In October 2006, the Department of the Interior awarded a $2 million grant based on the significance of the Slaughter Pen Farm. The money was provided through a U.S. Congressional appropriation from the Land and Water Conservation Fund. The fund supports non-federal efforts to acquire and preserve meaningful American Civil War battlefield lands. The program is administered by the American Battlefield Protection Program, an arm of the National Park Service. In addition, the Central Virginia Battlefields Trust (CVBT) committed $1 million toward the Slaughter Pen Farm fundraising campaign.

In addition to the preservation of the Slaughter Pen Farm, the American Battlefield Trust and its partners have acquired and preserved an additional 51 acres (0.21 km^{2}) of the battlefield in more than five other acquisitions.

In November 2012, archaeological investigations at the construction site of a new courthouse recovered Union artifacts. These included ammunition, smoking pipes, and food tins.

== In popular culture ==
- The Battle of Fredericksburg was depicted in the 2003 film Gods and Generals, based on the novel of the same name, a prequel of The Killer Angels from which the earlier film Gettysburg was adapted. Both the novel and film focused primarily on the disastrous charges on Marye's Heights, with the movie highlighting the charges of Hancock's division of II Corps, the Irish Brigade, Caldwell's brigade, and Zook's brigade, and the 20th Maine Infantry Regiment (V Corps).
- American author Louisa May Alcott fictionalized her experience nursing soldiers injured in the Battle of Fredericksburg in her book Hospital Sketches (1863).
- American heavy metal band Iced Earth wrote a song inspired by the battle, titled "Clear The Way (December 13th, 1862)", and included it in their 2017 album Incorruptible.
- A reenactment of the battle by robotic soldiers serves as a tourist attraction in the novel Logan's Run.

== See also ==
- Armies in the American Civil War
- Bibliography of Abraham Lincoln
- Bibliography of Ulysses S. Grant
- Bibliography of the American Civil War
- List of American Civil War battles
- List of costliest American Civil War land battles
- Second Battle of Fredericksburg
- Troop engagements of the American Civil War, 1862
