= John Bordenave Villepigue =

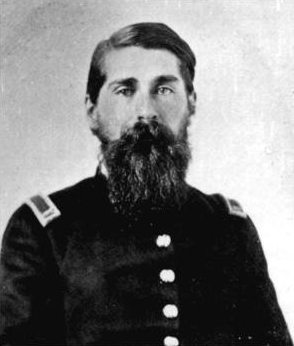
- Born: July 2, 1830; Camden, South Carolina, U.S.
- Died: November 9, 1862 (aged 32); Port Hudson, Louisiana, C.S.
- Burial place: Old Quaker Cemetery; Camden, South Carolina
- Military career
- Allegiance: United States of America; Confederate States of America
- Branch: United States Army; Confederate Army
- Service years: 1854–1861 (USA); 1861–1862 (CSA)
- Rank: First Lieutenant (USA); Brigadier General (CSA)
- Commands: 36th Georgia Infantry, Fort McRee, Fort Pillow, Brigade
- Conflicts: American Civil War Battle of Pensacola Second Battle of Corinth

John Bordenave Villepigue (July 2, 1830 – November 9, 1862) was a career U.S. Army officer who served on the American frontier and became a Confederate general in the American Civil War. One of his descendants would later be World War I Medal of Honor recipient John Cantey Villepigue.

== Early career ==
Villepigue (pronounced VIL-uh-PIG) was born in Camden, Kershaw County, South Carolina, of French descent; one of no less than six Confederate generals who came from Kershaw County. Admitted to The South Carolina Military Academy at the Arsenal 1 Jan 1846, transferred The Citadel, The Military College of South Carolina on 1 Jan 1847, a pay cadet and not eligible for a Beneficiary Cadet scholarship, he left to enter the United States Military Academy. He graduated from the United States Military Academy, in 1854, as a brevet second lieutenant in the 2nd U.S. Dragoons. His initial service was out on the frontiers of Kansas and Nebraska and he was involved in the Sioux expedition of 1855, the march to Fort Lookout, Dakota in 1856, and the Utah campaign of 1857-58. By now a first lieutenant, Villepigue spent time at the Carlisle Cavalry School and was on duty in Utah at the time of the secession, whereupon he resigned his commission on March 31, 1861, to enter the service of the Confederacy.

== Defense of Fort McRee ==
Villepigue was initially commissioned as a captain of artillery but was quickly promoted to the rank of colonel in the provisional army and assigned to the 36th Georgia Infantry Regiment. His first notable action was to command the defense of Fort McRee, guarding Pensacola harbor, during the bombardment of November 22, 1861. At the time, his commanding officer, General Braxton Bragg, suggested that for the number and caliber of guns involved, this would surely rank as the heaviest bombardment in the world to date. Bragg praised Villepigue's coolness under fire, even while grievously wounded, and noted that his example caused the troops he was leading—for the most part raw volunteers from Georgia and Mississippi—to fight with the courage of veterans.

General Bragg wrote of Colonel Villepigue that he was, "an educated soldier, possessing in an eminent degree the love and confidence of his officers and men, he had been specially selected for this important and perilous post. The result fully vindicates the fortunate choice, and presents for our admiration, blended in perfect harmony, the modest but heroic soldier with the humble but confiding Christian."

== Defense of Fort Pillow ==
Villepigue was promoted to the staff of General Bragg as chief of engineers and artillery. He moved to Mobile, Alabama, and was appointed a brigadier general early in 1862. General P.G.T. Beauregard, who also held him in high esteem, then moved him to command Fort Pillow, Tennessee. Villepigue recognized the weaknesses of the fort’s location, and made efforts to reduce them, however, they were under fairly constant bombardment by Union gunboats. Ordered to retire by General Beauregard, and to destroy all government property including guns, cannon and ammunition, his men blew up his fortifications and retreated to safety. Nineteen pieces of artillery were left behind.

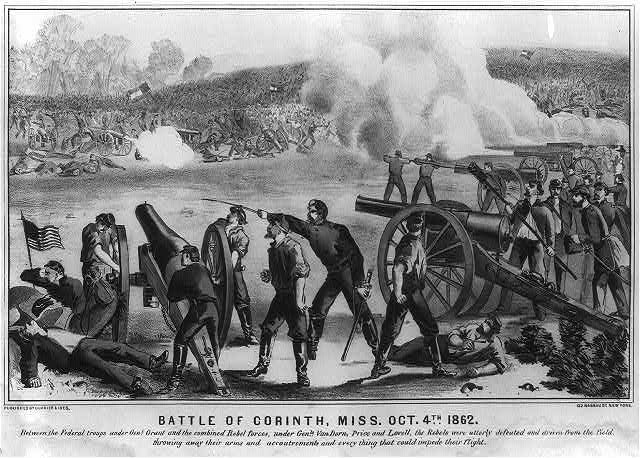
The Second Battle of Corinth

== Brigade commander ==
Villepigue commanded a brigade at the Second Battle of Corinth in October 1862, in the division of Major General Mansfield Lovell, under the overall command of Maj. Gen. Earl van Dorn. He distinguished himself in both the successful opening attack and the covering of the eventual retreat. The arduous nature of the campaign laid him low with a fever, however, and, with the promise of a major general's commission, he was sent to Port Hudson, Louisiana, to recuperate. No sooner had he arrived there than his condition worsened and he died of pneumonia.

Brigadier General Villepigue is buried in the "Old Quaker Cemetery" in his home town of Camden, South Carolina. John Cantey Villepigue was buried there also after his death in World War I. That cemetery also maintains the grave of World War I Medal of Honor recipient Richmond Hobson Hilton, the graves of Civil War Confederate Generals Joseph B. Kershaw and John Doby Kennedy, and that of Confederate soldier and hero from the Battle of Fredericksburg, Richard Rowland Kirkland.

== See also ==
- List of American Civil War generals (Confederate)
