= Richmond H. Hilton =

Richmond Hobson Hilton
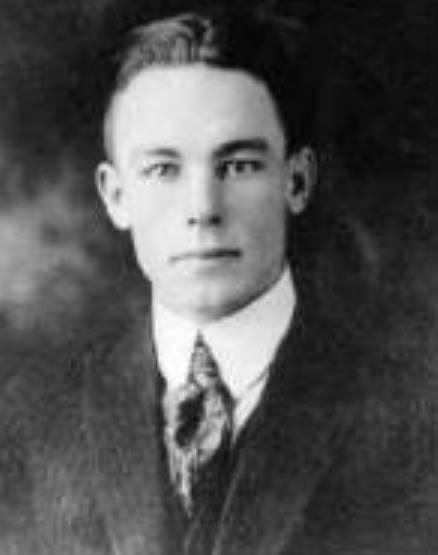
- Medal of Honor recipient
- Born: October 8, 1898; Westville, South Carolina, US
- Died: August 13, 1933 (aged 34)
- Burial place: Old Quaker Cemetery Camden, South Carolina
- Military career
- Allegiance: United States
- Branch: United States Army
- Rank: Sergeant
- Conflicts: World War I
- Awards: Medal of Honor (USA); Distinguished Conduct Medal (Great Britain); Médaille militaire (France); Croix de guerre 1914–1918 (Palme de bronze - Bronze palm) (France); Croce al Merito di Guerre (Italy); War Cross (Class III) (Note: Portuguese: Cruz de Guerra Class III – Device is a silver cross) (Portugal); Medal for Military Bravery (Montenegro)

Richmond Hobson Hilton (October 8, 1898 – August 13, 1933) was a South Carolina National Guard, 118th Infantry Regiment, 30th Infantry Division, U.S. Army Sergeant during World War I, and a Medal of Honor recipient–the first of two from Kershaw County, South Carolina to be awarded the medal during that war. He was also awarded the Distinguished Conduct Medal by Great Britain, the Médaille militaire and Croix de Guerre with bronze palm by France, the Croce al Merito di Guerre by Italy, the Medalha da Cruz de Guerra, Third Class by Portugal, and the Medal for Military Bravery by Montenegro. All were awarded for bravery in the face of the enemy.

== Biography ==
Hilton was born in Westville, South Carolina, and joined the army in Westville, assigned to Company M, 118th Infantry, 30th Division. On October 11, 1918, while fighting near Brancourt, France, Hilton's unit was held up by intense machine gun and small arms fire. Sgt. Hilton recognized that the machine gun fire was coming from a shell crater just ahead of them. Accompanied by several other soldiers, but moving out well ahead of them, Sgt. Hilton engaged the machine gun, using his rifle until his ammunition ran out, then using his pistol, killing six German soldiers, and capturing ten others. In the course of this action he was wounded by an exploding shell, which resulted in the loss of an arm.

After his discharge from the army, he returned home to Kershaw County a hero. He joined the Civitan Club of Columbia, of which he was a proud member. When asked why he was a Civitan, Hilton replied:

Because, in its expressed aims and purposes, Civitan represents a splendid group of men 'carrying on' to victory in the greatest battles of peace time needs. Because I feel that no man has a right to be a parasite upon his community. Civitan gives every man worthy of its membership an opportunity to serve through organized and collective effort. That is why I am a Civitan.

— Richmond Hilton

After his death in 1933, he was buried in "Old Quaker Cemetery" in Camden, South Carolina, which is also the cemetery in which World War I Medal of Honor recipient John Canty Villepigue is buried. He and Villepigue were both assigned to Company M, 118th Infantry, 30th Division, with Villepigue being awarded his Medal of Honor for actions taking place a few days later, on October 15, 1918, which resulted in injuries from which he later died. That cemetery also maintains the graves of Civil War Confederate Army Generals John Doby Kennedy and Joseph B. Kershaw, as well as Civil War hero Richard Rowland Kirkland.

== Medal of Honor citation ==
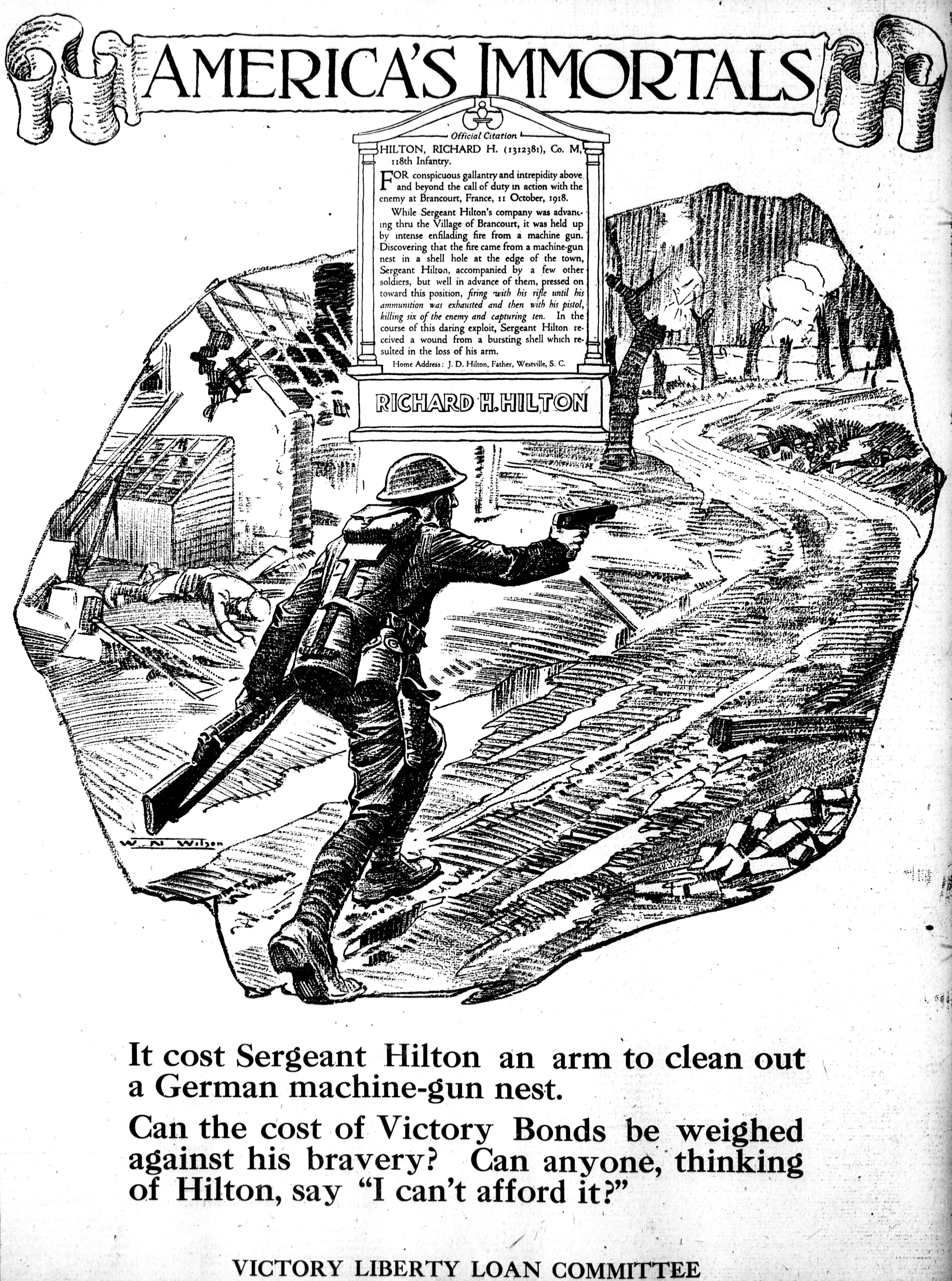
America's Immortal series for Richmond H Hilton in the Evening Public Ledger on April 19, 1919

Rank and organization: Sergeant, U.S. Army, Company M, 118th Infantry, 30th Division. Place and date: At Brancourt, France, October 11, 1918. Entered service at: Westville, South Carolina Born: October 8, 1898, Westville, South Carolina G.O. No.: 16, W.D., 1919.

Citation:

While Sgt. Hilton's company was advancing through the village of Brancourt it was held up by intense enfilading fire from a machinegun. Discovering that this fire came from a machinegun nest among shell holes at the edge of the town, Sgt. Hilton, accompanied by a few other soldiers, but well in advance of them, pressed on toward this position, firing with his rifle until his ammunition was exhausted, and then with his pistol, killing 6 of the enemy and capturing 10. In the course of this daring exploit he received a wound from a bursting shell, which resulted in the loss of his arm.

== See also ==
- List of Medal of Honor recipients
- List of Medal of Honor recipients for World War I
