= John C. Villepigue =

John Cantey Villepigue
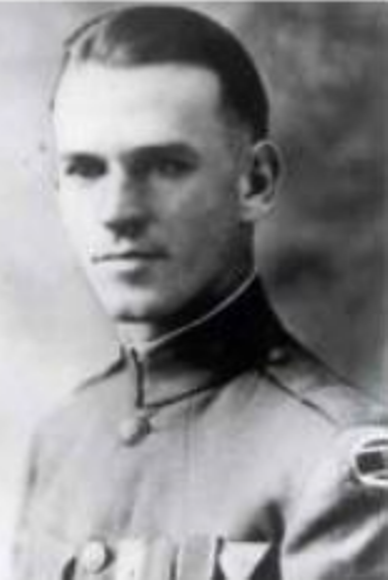
- Born: March 29, 1896; Camden, South Carolina, US
- Died: April 18, 1943 (aged 47); Camden, South Carolina, US
- Burial place: Old Quaker Cemetery, Camden, South Carolina
- Military career
- Allegiance: United States
- Branch: United States Army
- Rank: Corporal
- Service number: 1312401
- Conflicts: World War I
- Awards: Medal of Honor

John Cantey Villepigue (March 29, 1896 – April 18, 1943) was a corporal in the 118th Infantry, 30th Division which was federalized out of the South Carolina National Guard during World War I. He received the Medal of Honor for his actions during that war.

== Biography ==
Villepigue was a descendant of Confederate States Army General John Bordenave Villepigue. Like his relative, Villepigue was born and raised in Camden, South Carolina. Kershaw County, South Carolina, in which Camden is located, has a rich military history and was home to several heroes from different wars.

Villepigue entered the Army in Camden, assigned to Company M, 118th Infantry, 30th Division. While fighting near Vaux-Andigny, France, on October 15, 1918, Villepigue and two other soldiers were ordered to scout through the village of Vaux-Andigny. During their movement through the village, they were ambushed by German machine gun fire. One of his fellow soldiers was killed and the other was wounded. Advancing forward on his own for more than 500 yards, with his platoon left far behind, Villepigue encountered four enemy soldiers manning the machine gun pit. He engaged them with a hand grenade and killed them. Crawling another 150 yards forward, he encountered a second machine gun pit which he rushed alone. He killed another four enemy soldiers, captured six and secured two machine guns. He was badly wounded in the arm during this action.

Villepigue was buried near John B. Villepigue in the "Old Quaker Cemetery", in his hometown of Camden, South Carolina. This cemetery also maintains the grave of fellow World War I Medal of Honor recipient Richmond Hobson Hilton, the graves of Civil War Confederate Generals Joseph B. Kershaw and John Doby Kennedy, as well as Confederate soldier and hero from the Battle of Fredericksburg, Richard Rowland Kirkland. In 2004, Villepigue was honored by the South Carolina House of Representatives for his heroism during World War I.

== Medal of Honor citation ==
Rank and organization: Corporal, U.S. Army, Company M, 118th Infantry, 30th Division. Place and date: At Vaux-Andigny, France; October 15, 1918. Entered service at: Camden, South Carolina. Born: March 29, 1896; Camden, South Carolina. General Orders: War Department, General Orders No. 16 (January 22, 1919).

Citation:

Having been sent out with two other soldiers to scout through the village of Vaux-Andigny, Corporal Villepigue met with strong resistance from enemy machinegun fire, which killed one of his men and wounded the other. Continuing his advance without aid 500 yards in advance of his platoon and in the face of machinegun and artillery fire he encountered four of the enemy in a dugout, whom he attacked and killed with a hand grenade. Crawling forward to a point 150 yards in advance of his first encounter, he rushed a machinegun nest, killing four and capturing six of the enemy and taking two light machineguns. After being joined by his platoon he was severely wounded in the arm.

== Military awards ==
Villepigue's military decorations and awards include:

1st row	Medal of Honor	Purple Heart	World War I Victory Medal w/three bronze service stars to denote credit for the Somme Offensive, Ypres-Lys and Defensive Sector battle clasps.
2nd row	Distinguished Conduct Medal (Great Britain)	Médaille militaire (French Republic)	Croix de guerre 1914–1918 w/bronze palm (French Republic)
3rd row	Croce al Merito di Guerra (Italy)	Medal for Military Bravery (Kingdom of Montenegro)	Medalha da Cruz de Guerra, Third Class (Portuguese Republic)

== See also ==
- List of Medal of Honor recipients
