= 2nd South Carolina Infantry Regiment =

2nd South Carolina Infantry Regiment 2nd Palmetto Regiment
- Flag of South Carolina
- Active: April 9, 1861 to April 26th, 1865
- Country: Confederate States of America
- Allegiance: Confederate States Army
- Branch: Infantry
- Type: Regiment
- Engagements: American Civil War: Battle of Fort Sumter; Manassas Campaign; Battle of First Manassas; Peninsula Campaign; Battle of Yorktown (1862); Battle of Williamsburg; Seven Days Battles; Battle of Savage's Station; Battle of Malvern Hill; Maryland Campaign; Battle of Harper's Ferry; Battle of Sharpsburg; Battle of Fredericksburg; Battle of Chancellorsville; Battle of Gettysburg; Chickamauga Campaign; Battle of Chickamauga; Siege of Knoxville; Battle of Campbell's Station; Battle of Bean's Station; Overland Campaign; Battle of the Wilderness; Battle of Spotsylvania Court House; Battle of North Anna; Battle of Cold Harbor; Siege of Petersburg; First Battle of Deep Bottom; Valley Campaigns of 1864; Battle of Cedar Creek; Carolinas campaign; Battle of Averasboro; Battle of Bentonville

Commanders
- Notable commanders: Maj. Gen. Joseph B. Kershaw; Brig. Gen. John D. Kennedy; Lt. Col. Franklin Gaillard; Col. William Wallace

The 2nd South Carolina Infantry Regiment, also known as 2nd Palmetto Regiment, was a Confederate States Army regiment in the American Civil War.

== History ==
=== Formation ===
The 2nd Palmetto Regiment was formed for state service on April 9, 1861, under the command of Colonel Joseph Brevard Kershaw and Lieutenant Colonel James D. Blanding with ten companies. When called on to fight in Virginia, six of the ten refused to leave South Carolina and stayed under the command of Lt. Col. Blanding while the other four were led by Col. Kershaw into Virginia. Eventually, six more companies joined them in Virginia.

Company: Nickname	District	Captain	1st Lieutenant
A: "Governor's Guard"	Richland	William Casson	M. A. Shelton
B: "Butler's Guards"	Greenville	Augustus D. Hoke	Robert C. Pulliam
C: "Columbia Grays"	Columbia	William Wallace	Solomon Lorick
D: "Sumter Guards"	Sumter	John S. Richardson	J. D. Wilder
E: "Camden Volunteers"	Camden	John D. Kennedy	William Zachariah Leitner
F: "Secession Guard"	Anderson and Abbeville	William Watson Perryman	
G: "Flat Rock Guards"	Kershaw	Columbus Cureton Haile	
H: "Lancaster Invincibles"	Lancaster	Amos W. McManus	
I: "Palmetto Guards"	Charleston	George Barnwell Cuthbert	
K: "Brooks Guards Volunteers"	Charleston	Andrew Burnett Rhett	

=== Initial duty ===
The unit started its first services on Morris Island, SC, helping to build fortifications for the soon attack of Fort Sumter. They soon participated in the bombardment of Fort Sumter from Morris Island. Afterward they were ordered to Virginia, but only four of the ten companies were to leave for Manassas, as the other six would not agree to leave. There, the four companies fought at First Manassas as part of Bonham's Brigade.

=== After First Manassas ===
Soon after their baptism of fire, they were on the Virginia Peninsula. Their original Colonel, Joseph Brevard Kershaw, was soon promoted to Brigadier General, commanding the brigade that the 2nd was part of, and Captain John Doby Kennedy of Company E was promoted to Colonel. They fought at Williamsburg and Yorktown, and eventually at the Seven Days Battles. Once the federal Army of the Potomac was defeated, the Army of Northern Virginia went to Northern Virginia and fought at the Second Battle of Manassas. Kershaw's Brigade, and the 2nd South Carolina, missed the battle as they were on detached duty; but they rejoined the main army in time for the first invasion of the north.

=== First Invasion of the North and afterward ===
At the beginning of the First Invasion of the North, the 2nd along with McLaws Division and Jacksons Wing successfully forced the surrender of the Harpers Ferry garrison. During the actual fighting phases, Kershaw's Brigade and Barksdale's Mississippi Brigade were to attack a fortified position in unison, Kershaw attacking the front while Barksdale pressured the flank. As the attack started, Barksdale waited until the third time Kershaw's South Carolinians attacked, which caused many to die in the charges beforehand. After the surrender, the rest of the troops at Harpers Ferry, excluding Hill's "Light Division", met with the rest of the Army of Northern Virginia at Sharpsburg, Maryland. Here they fought in the West Woods. Earlier the federal I and XII Corps pushed Confederate troops away from the Dunker Church and Cornfield and the lead division of the II Corps was marching forward into the West Woods, a formation of brigades in line of battle on after the other. Whilst they were moving forward, the other two division of the II Corps swung around in front of the Sunken Lane. McLaws Division was waiting in the West Woods and once the leading division, under Major General Israel B. Richardson, was in their front, oblivious to the fact of the waiting confederates, they attacked in one of the greatest flanking movements of the war. Kershaw's Brigade fought here for the entire day, eventually helping to retake the lost grounds at the Dunker Church, it was here that Colonel Kennedy was wounded. After the retreat from Maryland, Kershaw's Brigade participated in the Battle of Fredericksburg. From the 2nd, Companies D, E, and G, under the command of Captain William Z. Leitner of Company E, were almost in the center of the stone wall on Marye's Heights. After the day's fighting, Sergeant Richard Rowland Kirkland of Company E/G gave water to the wounded union soldiers, earning him the nickname "The Angel of Marye's Heights". Soon afterward they fought at Chancellorsville, participating in the opening fight on May 1, 1863.

=== Second Invasion of the North ===
Now as part of the 1st Corps, Army of Northern Virginia, the 2nd with the rest of the army started for Pennsylvania. There they fought at Gettysburg, specifically Kershaw's Brigade fought in the Peach Orchard and the Wheatfield, two of the most savage fighting spots of the battle. At the Peach Orchard, the 2nd advanced with two other units of Kershaw's Brigade, the 3rd SC Battalion and the 8th SC Infantry, through the orchard and eventually came under strong artillery fire. Thousands of pieces of shrapnel and canister hit their lines, and the 2nd lost about 50% of their numbers when an unknown officer ordered the regiment to turn, a perfect opportunity for the federal artillerist. Eventually pushing the federals away, they marched forward into the Wheatfield, where they fought in a bloody melee/rifle engagement. By the end of the day the regiment had lost more than half their men, and soon they would make the retreat to Virginia with the rest of the army.

=== Retreat to Virginia and Tennessee ===
After Gettysburg, the Army of Northern Virginia retreated into Virginia to rest and recuperate. It was then chosen that as the winter came and the armies settled down that the 1st Corps under Lt Gen James Longstreet would transfer to the Army of Tennessee to help it achieve a victory. When they arrived in northern Georgia, the Battle of Chickmauga had occurred all the day before, and Longstreet's fresh troops were chosen to lead an assault on the federal line. When the assault began, Kershaw's Brigade fought troops from Maj Gen Thomas L. Crittenden's XXI Corps and pushed them back until stopped at Snodgrass Hill, where 2nd Lieutenant Richard R. Kirkland, the "Angel of Marye's Heights" was killed. After the retreat of the federal Army of the Cumberland the Army of Tennessee moved in to begin the Siege of Chattanooga but arguments between army commander Braxton Bragg and other commanders including Longstreet forced his Corps to return to Virginia. Before doing so, Longstreet tried to recapture Knoxville but failed in doing so. Soon afterwards, the new overall commander of Union forces, Lt. Gen. Ulysses S. Grant, started the Overland Campaign, opening with the Battle of the Wilderness. The Confederate 3rd Corps under A.P. Hill, after a whole day of inconclusive fighting, was suddenly attacked the day after on May 6, 1864, completely breaking and running. But just in time to aid the 3rd Corps was the arrival of the 1st Corps, with Kershaw's Brigade in the lead. Here they successfully pushed back troops of the federal II Corps under Maj. Gen. Winfield S. Hancock, before the end of the battle Lt. Col. Franklin Gaillard was mortally wounded. Fighting became inconclusive, and the Army of Northern Virginia soon retreated to Spotsylvania Court House. Here the Brigade, under the command of Colonel John Henegan of the 8th SC Infantry whilst Gen. Kershaw was commanding the division, dug in and prepared for the battle soon to come. On May 8, 1864, troops from the 3rd Division, V Corps attacked the entrenchments of Henegan's Brigade and were repulsed after tough fighting. They were attacked again on May 12, and again repulsed the federal advance. Then they had limited combat in the Battle of North Anna. The troops of the confederate 1st Corps were soon moved to counter Grant's flanking maneuver and soon dug in at Cold Harbor. When the federals approached, the Confederates unleashed a devastating fire, and the battle ended with thousands of federal casualties. Soon afterward they were forced into the Siege of Petersburg and fought in the First Deep Bottom.

=== Carolinas and Surrender ===
After First Deep Bottom, the 2nd and the rest of the brigade, commanded by now Brigadier General Kennedy, as well as other units were sent to join the Army of Tennessee; which was a force falling apart that could no longer fight independently. They were joined with forces from the Department of SC, GA, and FL by General Joseph E. Johnston and retreated into North Carolina. On March 16, 1865, Kennedy's Brigade as well as other units successfully delayed the federal army facing them under Maj. Gen. William Tecumseh Sherman at the Battle of Averasboro. On March 19–21 they fought their last engagement, Bentonville, where they faced down troops of the federal XX Corps in an inclusive battle. Soon afterward, on April 9, 1865, exactly 4 years after their acceptance into state service, they were consolidated with the remains of the 20th South Carolina Infantry and part of Blanchard's Reserves. On April 26, 1865, they surrendered with the rest of the Army of Tennessee; dissolving the regiment and sending its members home.

== See also ==
- List of South Carolina Confederate Civil War units
- South Carolina in the American Civil War
