= Old Quaker Cemetery =

Cemetery in Kershaw County, South Carolina, US

Coordinates: 34°13′59″N 80°36′44″W

Details
- Established: 1759
- Location: Camden, South Carolina, U.S.
- No. of graves: roughly 6,100
- Find a Grave: Old Quaker Cemetery

Old Quaker Cemetery, founded in 1759, is a cemetery located in Camden, South Carolina, in Kershaw County. It dates back to the earliest days of Camden, which was first settled in 1730, and is the oldest inland city in South Carolina. The cemetery is notable in that it maintains the gravesites of numerous famous people, to include members of the Quaker community, Revolutionary War soldiers, three Civil War Confederate Army generals, two Medal of Honor recipients, and one South Carolina Governor. The site contains a historical marker, installed in 2023 by the Wateree Chapter of the National Society Colonial Dames XVII Century. It is also known as the Quaker Burying Ground.

== Notable gravesites ==
- Joseph Brevard (1766–1821) – Revolutionary War figure, US Representative, and Supreme Court jurist
- Richmond Hobson Hilton (1898–1933) – World War I Medal of Honor recipient
- John Doby Kennedy (1840–1896) – Confederate Army general, and later Lieutenant Governor
- Joseph Brevard Kershaw (1822–1894) – Confederate Army general, president of the State Senate, and for whose forebearers Kershaw County was named
- Richard Rowland Kirkland (1843–1863 †) – Civil War Confederate soldier and hero at the Battle of Fredericksburg
- John Peter Richardson III (1829–1899) – Governor
- Donald Leroy Truesdell (1906–1993) – Medal of Honor for action in the Occupation of Nicaragua (cenotaph)
- John Bordenave Villepigue (1830–1862) – Confederate Civil War general, and ancestor to John Canty Villepigue
- John Canty Villepigue (1896–1943) – World War I Medal of Honor recipient
