= Richard Rowland Kirkland =

Confederate soldier known for humanitarian action toward Union soldiers

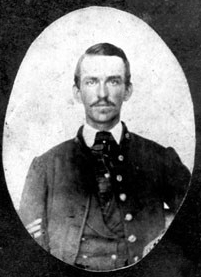
- Kirkland (Before 1863)
- Nickname: The Angel of Marye's Heights
- Born: August 1843; Kershaw County, South Carolina, U.S.
- Died: September 20, 1863 (aged 20) Chickamauga, Georgia, U.S.
- Buried: Old Quaker Cemetery; Camden, South Carolina, U.S.
- Allegiance: Confederate States
- Branch: Confederate States Army
- Service years: 1861–1863
- Rank: Second Lieutenant
- Conflicts: American Civil War: First Battle of Bull Run; Battle of Savage's Station; Battle of Harpers Ferry; Battle of Antietam; Battle of Fredericksburg; Battle of Chancellorsville; Battle of Gettysburg; Battle of Chickamauga †

Richard Rowland Kirkland (August 1843 – September 20, 1863), known as "The Angel of Marye's Heights", was a Confederate soldier during the American Civil War, noted by both sides for his bravery and the story of his humanitarian actions during the Battle of Fredericksburg.

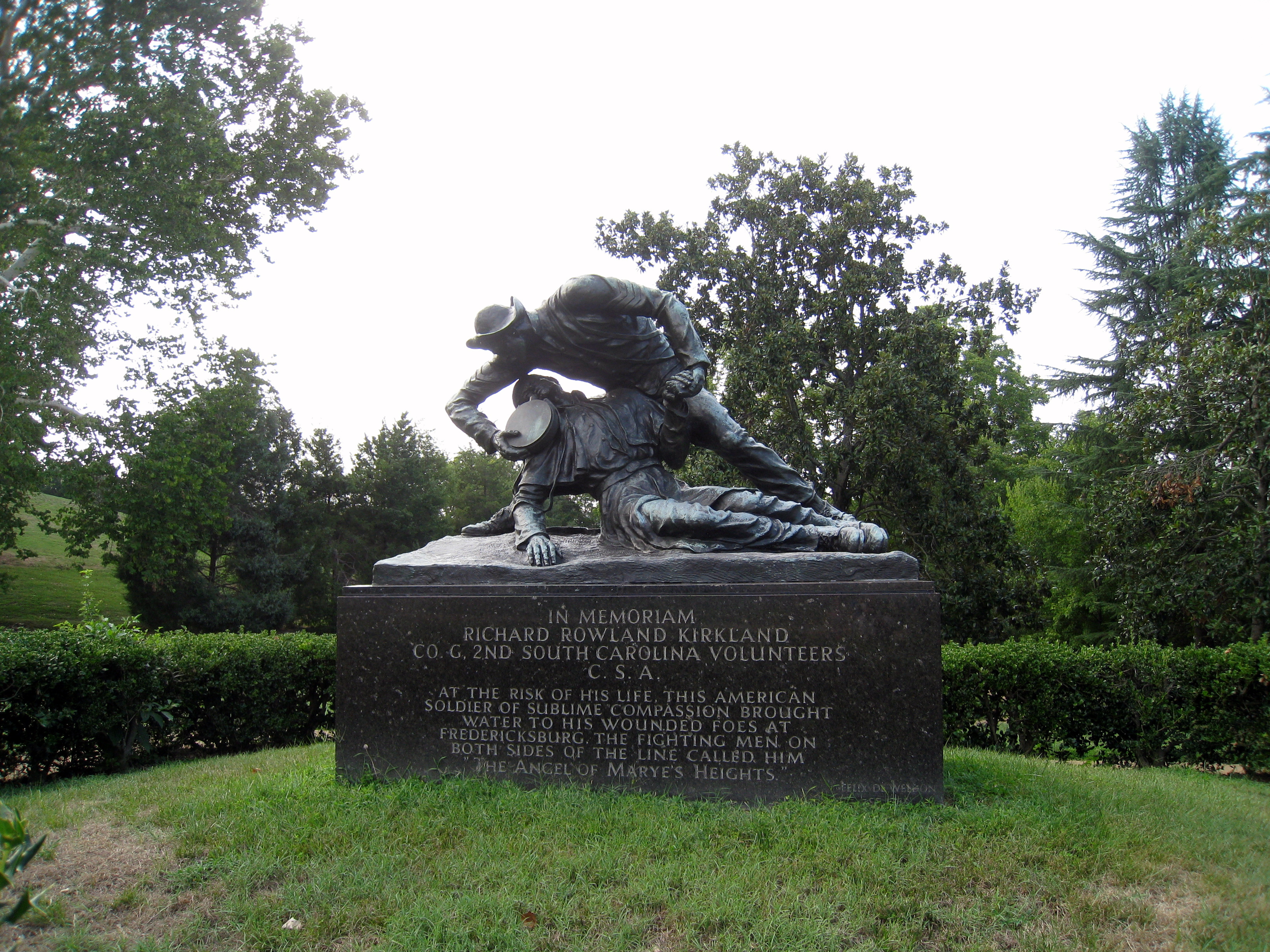
Monument depicting Kirkland giving water to wounded Union troops at Fredericksburg created by Felix de Weldon

== Early life ==
Kirkland was born in Flat Rock, Kershaw County, South Carolina. He was the fifth son of Mary and John Kirkland. He received a moderate education during his youth, as was typical during that era.

== American Civil War ==
Kirkland enlisted in the Confederate Army in 1861. He was first assigned to Company E, 2nd South Carolina Volunteer Infantry, but was later transferred to Company G of the same regiment, and was promoted to sergeant. He first saw action during the First Battle of Bull Run (First Manassas), and later in the Battle of Savage's Station, Battle for Maryland Heights and Battle of Antietam.

== Battle of Fredericksburg ==
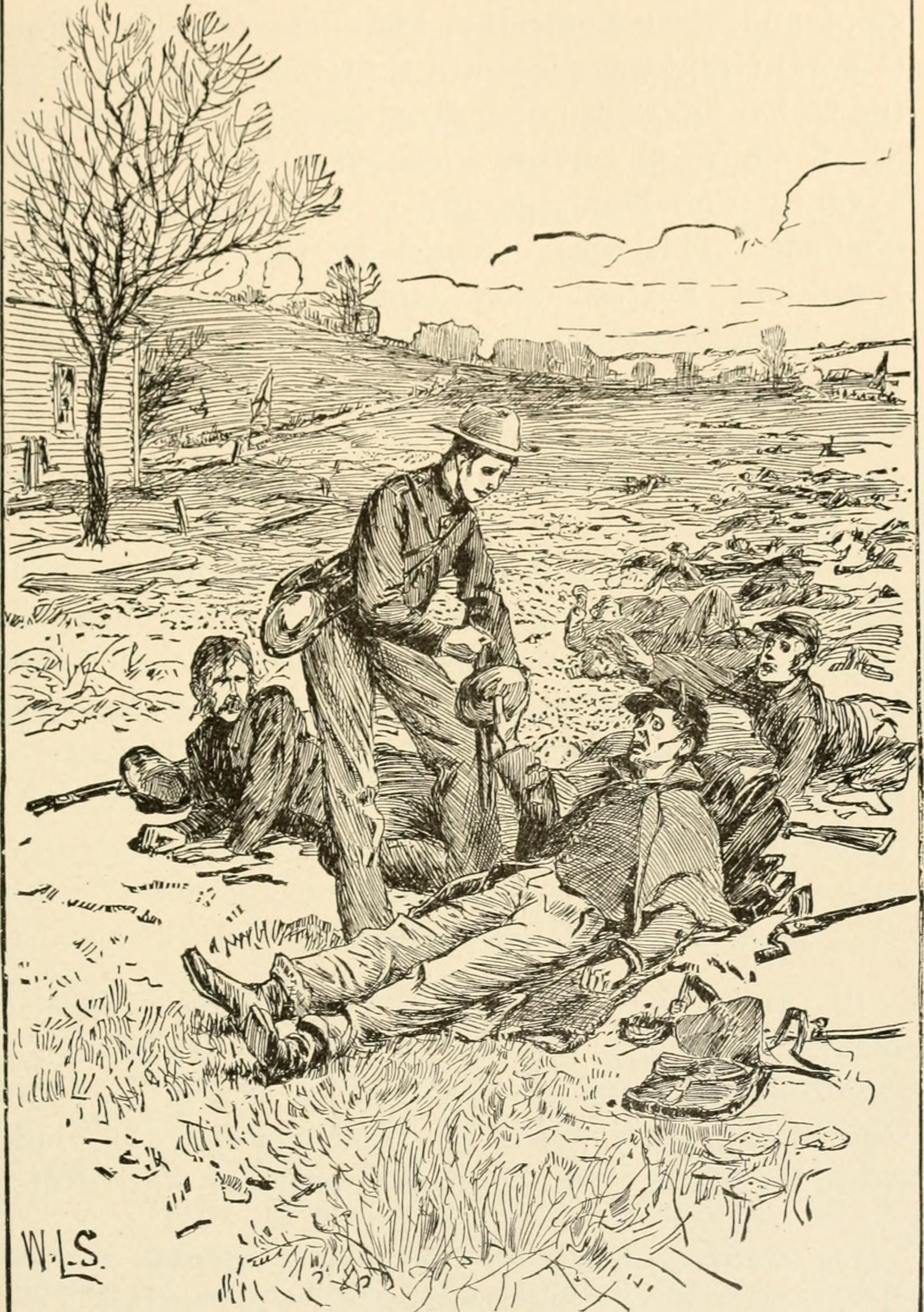
Sketch of Kirkland helping wounded soldiers

On December 13, 1862, Kirkland's unit had formed at the stone wall at the base of "Marye's Heights" near Fredericksburg, Virginia. In the action that followed, his unit inflicted heavy casualties on the Union attackers. On the night of December 13, walking wounded made their way to the field hospital while the disabled were forced to remain on the battlefield. The morning of December 14 revealed that over 8,000 Union soldiers had been shot in front of the stone wall at Marye's Heights. Many of those remaining on the battlefield were still alive, but suffering from wounds and a lack of water.

Soldiers from both sides heard to the painful cries of the wounded for hours, with neither side daring to venture out for fear of being shot by the enemy. At some point during the day, Kirkland allegedly approached Confederate Brig. Gen. Joseph B. Kershaw, also from Kershaw County, South Carolina, and informed him that he wished to help the wounded Union soldiers. By Kershaw's own account, at first, he denied the request, but later he relented. However, when Kirkland asked if he could show a white handkerchief, General Kershaw stated he could not. Kirkland responded, "All right, sir, I'll take my chances."

Kirkland gathered canteens, filled them with water, then ventured out onto the battlefield. He ventured back and forth several times, giving the wounded Union soldiers water, warm clothing, and blankets. Soldiers from both the Union and Confederate armies watched as he performed his task, but no one fired a shot. General Kershaw later stated that he observed Kirkland for more than an hour and a half. At first, it was thought that the Union would open fire, which would result in the Confederacy returning fire, resulting in Kirkland being caught in a crossfire. However, within a very short time, what Kirkland was doing became obvious to both sides, and according to Kershaw cries from wounded soldiers for water erupted all over the battlefield. Kirkland did not stop until he had helped every wounded soldier (Confederate and Federal) on the Confederate end of the battlefield. Sergeant Kirkland's actions remain a legend in Fredericksburg to this day.

The truth of the story has been disputed. While the story seems to have been embellished, earlier sources show that it was not fabricated by Kershaw, and was likely based in truth.

== Later engagements and death ==
Kirkland went on to fight in both the Battle of Chancellorsville and the Battle of Gettysburg where, after further distinguishing himself for courage and ability, he was promoted to lieutenant. On September 20, 1863, he and two other men took command of a charge near "Snodgrass Hill" during the Battle of Chickamauga. Realizing they had advanced too far forward of their own unit, they attempted to return and Kirkland was shot. His last words were, "I'm done for... save yourselves and please tell my Pa I died right."

His body was returned home to Kershaw County, South Carolina, and he was buried in the "Old Quaker Cemetery" in Camden. A friend who visited the original gravesite years later was said to have commented that it was one of the most sequestered, unfrequented, and inaccessible spots for a grave he'd ever seen. General Kershaw would later be buried in that same cemetery, which also maintains the graves of Civil War General John Bordenave Villepigue and his descendant, World War I Medal of Honor recipient John Canty Villepigue, in addition to World War I Medal of Honor recipient Richmond Hobson Hilton.

In 1965, sculptor Felix de Weldon unveiled a statue in front of the stone wall at the Fredericksburg battlefield in Kirkland's honor. The Sons of Confederate Veterans posthumously awarded Kirkland their Confederate Medal of Honor, created in 1977.

== Sources ==
- Richard Rowland Kirkland "Angel of Mercy"
- Richard Rowland Kirkland
- First public account of Kirkland's actions at Marye's Heights
- Is the Richard Kirkland Story True?
