= William Zachariah Leitner =

American politician (1829–1888)

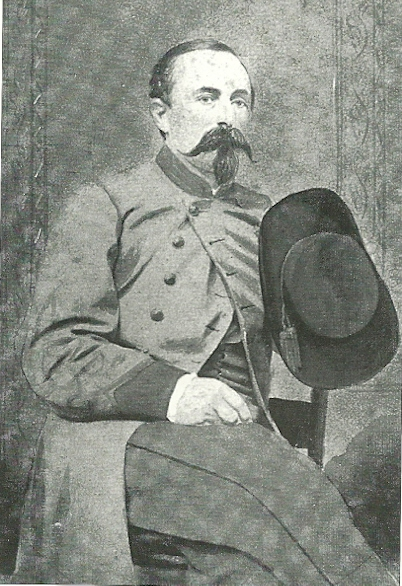
- Born: September 23, 1829 near Winnsboro, South Carolina, U.S.
- Died: April 23, 1888 (aged 58); Columbia, South Carolina, U.S.
- Burial place: Elmwood Cemetery; Columbia, South Carolina, U.S.
- Alma mater: South Carolina College
- Spouse: Annie D. Dunlap
- Children: 5
- Military career
- Allegiance: Confederate States of America
- Branch: Confederate States Army; South Carolina Militia
- Service years: 1861–64 (CSA)
- Rank: Captain (CSA); Lieutenant Colonel (SCM)
- Unit: 2nd South Carolina Infantry
- Conflicts: American Civil War; First Battle of Manassas; Battle of Yorktown (1862); Battle of Williamsburg; Battle of Savage's Station; Battle of Harpers Ferry; Battle of Sharpsburg; Battle of Fredericksburg; Battle of Chancellorsville; Battle of Gettysburg
- Other work: Lawyer; politician

William Zachariah Leitner (September 23, 1829 – April 15, 1888) was a lawyer, state senator, state Secretary of State, and a Confederate officer in the American Civil War.

== Early life ==
William Z. Leitner was born on September 3, 1829, near Winnsboro, Fairfield County, South Carolina, to George Leitner. His father was a wealthy planter. He was educated at the Baptist Institute near his family's home four miles away from Winnsboro. He graduated from South Carolina College in 1849. He taught law to John D. Kennedy. Following graduation, he was chair of Greek and Latin at Shurley Institute for two or three years. He was admitted to the bar in 1853.

== Career ==
Leitner then practiced law in Kershaw County and in Winnsboro.

Leitner enlisted with the Camden Volunteers as a first lieutenant on April 8, 1861. He then moved with the regiment to Morris Island. He was a part of Company D of the 25th Regiment of the South Carolina Militia. He supported the batteries at the Battle of Fort Sumter. He was then made captain of Company E of Kenshaw's 2nd South Carolina Volunteers. He then went to Virginia and was in most battles fought by the Army of Northern Virginia, including the First Battle of Manassas. In the Battle of Gettysburg, a grapeshot shattered his right leg below the knee and his leg was amputated. He attained the rank of lieutenant colonel. His comrades and friends called him "Old Zack". He was forced to resign in 1864 while serving as enrolling officer for Kershaw district.

Leitner was elected to the South Carolina House of Representatives, representing Kershaw County and served two terms. He was then elected district judge and held the position until a military commander took over during Reconstruction. In 1876, he ran as the Democratic candidate, but was defeated. In 1884, he was elected to the South Carolina Senate, representing Kershaw County. He served until 1884 when he was elected as secretary of state of South Carolina. He served under Governor John Peter Richardson III.

Leitner was vice president of the Survivors' Association of Richland County.

== Personal life ==
Leitner married Annie D. Dunlap of Camden. They had five children. He moved to Camden around 1858 and remained there until the 1880s. He lived on Senate Street in Columbia. He was a member of the Washington Street Methodist Church. He died from a heart attack on April 15, 1888. He was buried in Elmwood Cemetery in Columbia.
