= 1st Confederate Infantry Regiment =

Infantry regiment of the Confederate States Army

- Active: 1861–1865
- Disbanded: May 2, 1865
- Country: Confederate States
- Branch: Army
- Type: Infantry
- Size: Regiment
- Battles: American Civil War: Battle of Pensacola; Battle of Chickamauga; Battle of Franklin; Carolinas Campaign

Commanders
- Notable commanders: John Bordenave Villepigue

The 1st Confederate Infantry Regiment was an infantry unit of the Confederate States Army in the American Civil War. Formed from a group of Georgia and Mississippi volunteers assembled during the Battle of Pensacola in 1861, the regiment was given a "Confederate" designation as it contained soldiers from multiple states. The 1st Confederate fought in numerous battles of the western theater before surrendering in North Carolina in 1865.

== History ==
At the outbreak of the secession crisis, numerous Southern states sent volunteer companies to Pensacola, Florida and laid siege to the federal forts located there. The 36th Georgia Infantry Regiment was organized from a group of Georgia and Mississippi companies in April 1861, and was led by John Bordenave Villepigue, a graduate of West Point. During the long siege, Villepigue's regiment occupied Fort McRee, which had been abandoned by federal troops, and the men were subjected to a heavy federal bombardment on November 22, 1861. The Confederates would later abandon Pensacola in May, 1862.

In late January 1862 Colonel Villepigue was promoted to chief of artillery on General Braxton Bragg's staff, and the name of the regiment was changed to the 1st Confederate Infantry. Two companies from the 26th Tennessee Infantry were attached to the regiment on November 8, 1862. As the men were familiar with artillery from their time in Pensacola, in the summer and fall of 1863 a detachment of the regiment was assigned to man the guns of Fort Gaines in Mobile Bay.

Assigned to the brigade of General John K. Jackson, in the Battle of Chickamauga on September 18-20, 1863 the regiment lost 10 killed and 73 wounded of the 167 men engaged. After the regiment moved into Tennessee in September 1863, Captain J. R. Rhodes was executed for encouraging desertions from the regiment and embezzling money from substitutes. Lieutenant Colonel Jacob W. Aderhold was found to be involved in the same offenses and demoted to the ranks.

During the Franklin-Nashville Campaign in Tennessee, the 1st Confederate took part in the disastrous assault on the fortified Union lines at the Battle of Franklin on November 30, 1864, and commander of the regiment George A. Smith was killed. Lieutenant Colonel James C. Gordon then took command of the regiment, alongside the 66th Georgia.

During the 1865 Carolinas Campaign, the 1st Confederate was consolidated with the remnants of the 25th, 29th, 30th, and 66th Georgia Infantry Regiments, as well as the 1st Georgia Sharpshooter Battalion. This consolidated unit was with the army of General Joseph E. Johnston when his forces surrendered in North Carolina at the close of the war in May, 1865.

== Name ==
This regiment was first designated as the 36th Georgia Infantry at the time of the siege of Pensacola in April 1861. In late January 1862, the name was changed to the 1st Confederate Infantry in recognition that soldiers from multiple states were serving together in one unit. Another unrelated regiment, led by Colonel Charles E. Broyles, was later given the 36th Georgia designation. In the Official Records of the Union and Confederate Armies, the 1st Confederate Regiment is sometimes referred to as the "First Georgia Infantry (Confederate)" or "First (Confederate) Regiment Georgia Volunteers", which is similar to the names of three other unrelated units: the 1st Georgia Regulars, the 1st Georgia Volunteer Infantry led by Colonel Charles H. Olmstead, and another 1st Georgia Volunteer Infantry led by Colonel James N. Ramsey.

== Commanding officers ==
Commanding officers of the 1st Confederate Infantry:

- Col. John Bordenave Villepigue, promoted to brigadier general
- Col. George A. Smith, killed at Franklin, 1864.
- Lt. Col. Jacob W. Aderhold, demoted to the ranks September 1863.
- Lt. Col. James C. Gordon

== See also ==
- List of Confederate units from Georgia in the American Civil War
- List of Confederate Government units in the American Civil War
