= Fredericksburg and Spotsylvania National Military Park =

American Civil War battlefields in Virginia

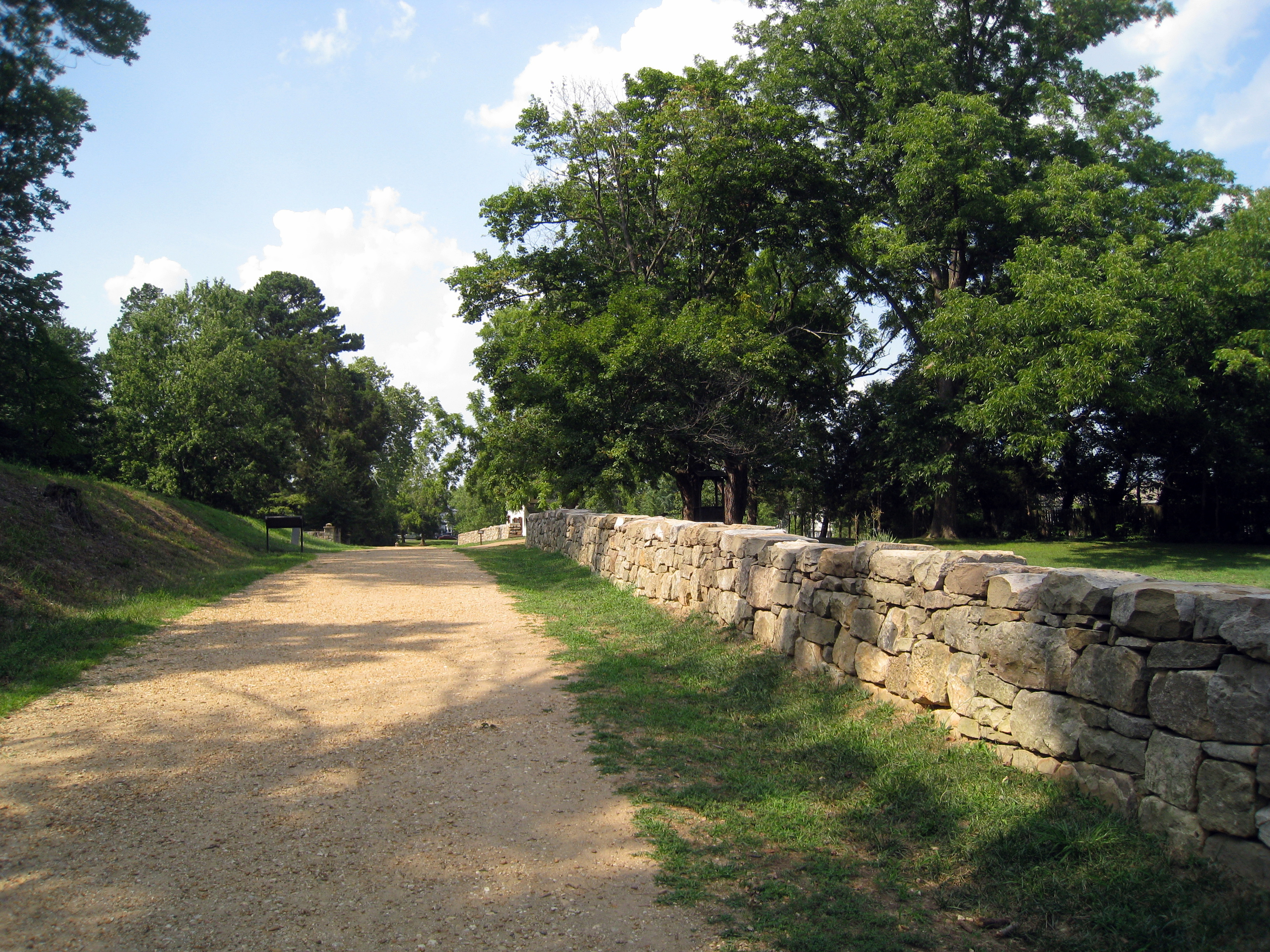
- The stone wall along Sunken Road, in Fredericksburg

- Location within Virginia Location within the United States
- Location: Spotsylvania County and Fredericksburg counties, U.S.
- Nearest city: Fredericksburg, Virginia, U.S.
- Coordinates: 38°17′35″N 77°28′09″W
- Area: 8,405 acres (34.01 km^{2})
- Established: February 14, 1927
- Visitors: 765,991 (in 2025)
- Governing body: National Park Service
- Website: Fredericksburg & Spotsylvania National Military Park
- Fredericksburg and Spotsylvania County Battlefields Memorial National Military Park
- U.S. National Register of Historic Places
- U.S. National Military Park
- Virginia Landmarks Register
- Area: 4,601.1 acres (1,862 ha)
- NRHP reference No.: 66000046
- VLR No.: 111-0147

Significant dates
- Added to NRHP: October 15, 1966
- Designated VLR: January 16, 1973

Fredericksburg and Spotsylvania National Military Park is a unit of the National Park Service in Fredericksburg, Virginia, and elsewhere in Spotsylvania County, commemorating four major battles in the American Civil War: Fredericksburg, Chancellorsville, The Wilderness, and Spotsylvania.

== Battles ==
- Fredericksburg – December 11–15, 1862

Failed attempt by General Ambrose Burnside to cross the Rappahannock and take the Confederate capital Richmond. Delayed arrival of the pontoons had given Robert E. Lee time to fortify the high ground, and the result was a one-sided massacre. Visitor center staffed by Park Service rangers.

- Chancellorsville – May 1–3, 1863

A bold gamble by Robert E. Lee, dividing his forces and sending Stonewall Jackson on a flanking attack, which took the enemy totally by surprise, causing the Union commander General Joseph Hooker to lose his nerve and call retreat. Visitor center staffed by Park Service rangers.

- The Wilderness – May 5–7, 1864

Robert E. Lee's first battle against Grant, whose advantage in numbers of soldiers, artillery, and cavalry could not be used in the confining dense forest. Casualties were high on both sides, and the battle is classed as a draw. Grant withdrew, but only in order to force another battle in more open country. Exhibit shelters, staffed on a seasonal basis.

- Spotsylvania – May 8–21, 1864

Key crossroads which Grant hoped to occupy, to keep his army between Lee and the Confederate capital Richmond. Lee was able to take this position just ahead of Grant. Heavy rain had dampened the gunpowder, leading to intense hand-to-hand fighting. Exhibit shelters, staffed on a seasonal basis.

The park also preserves four historic buildings associated with the battles: Chatham Manor, Salem Church, Ellwood Manor, and the house where Stonewall Jackson died. The ruins of the Chancellor family mansion are included. Chatham Manor in Stafford County is open daily. All sites are free.

== Park history ==
The park was established as Fredericksburg and Spotsylvania County Battlefields Memorial National Military Park on February 14, 1927, and transferred from the War Department August 10, 1933. The lengthy name remains its official designation—75 letters, the longest name of any unit in the national park system. It was listed on the National Register of Historic Places on October 15, 1966. The park includes 8374 acres (33.89 km^{2}), of which 7369 acres (30 km^{2}) are owned by the Federal government. Over 500,000 people visit the battlefield each year.

== Cemetery ==
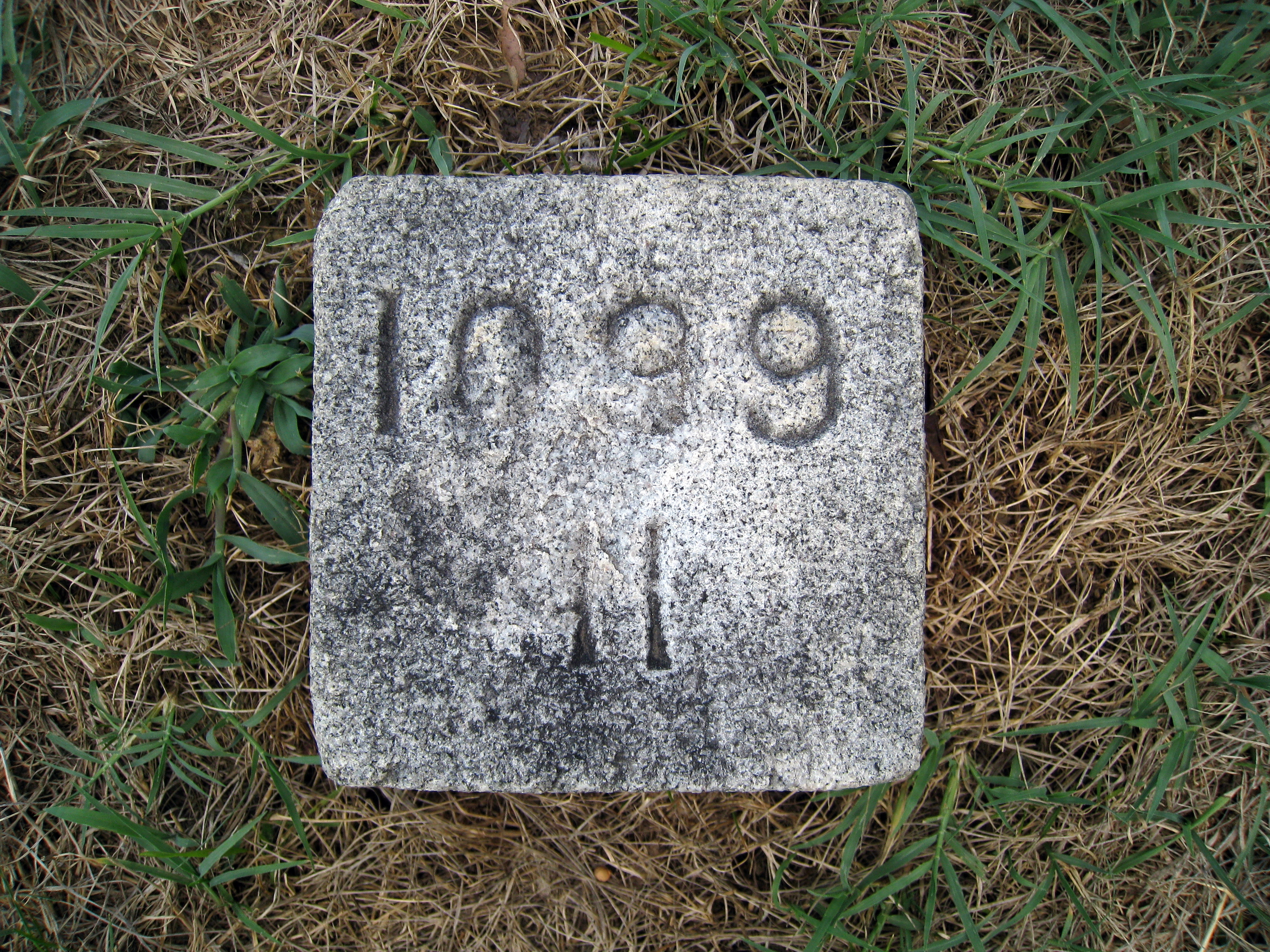
Mass grave headstone for 11 soldiers

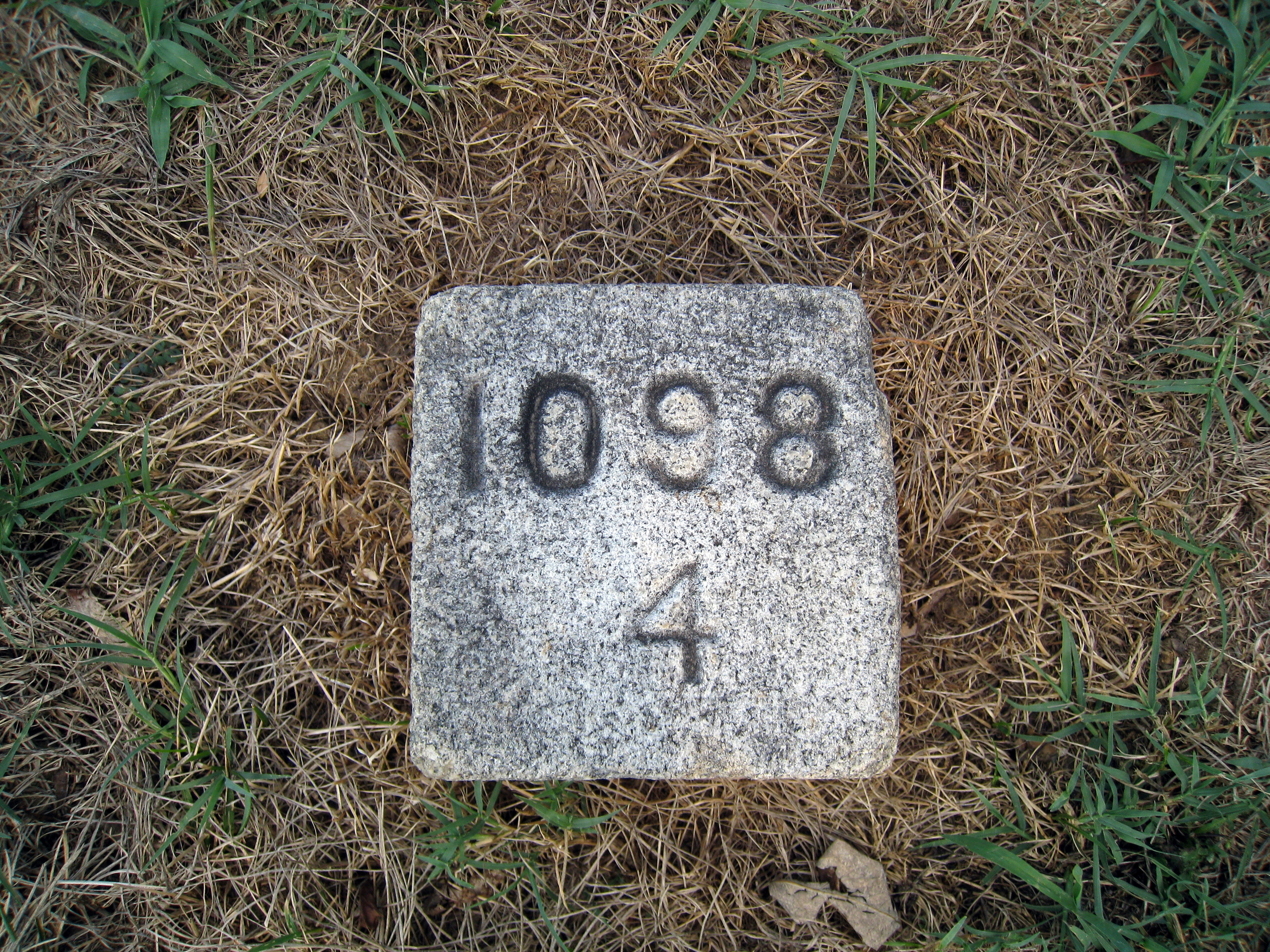
Mass grave headstone for 4 soldiers

Fredericksburg National Cemetery was created by act of Congress, in July 1865 after reunification of the states, to honor the Federal soldiers who died in local battles or from disease. The cemetery was placed on Marye's Heights, a Confederate stronghold during the Battle of Fredericksburg. There are a total of 15,243 Civil War interments, of those, only 2,473 were identified.

Graves of soldiers, known and unknown, are distinguished by their markers. Identified soldiers are buried in individual graves, marked by a rounded headstone inscribed with the soldier's name and state. Unknown soldiers were buried in mass graves, the headstones marking these plots contain two numbers. The first, upper, number identifies the plot while the second, lower, number identifies the number of soldiers buried in that plot.

Approximately 100 20th-century soldiers are buried in the cemetery; in some cases, their spouses were buried next to them. The cemetery allowed new burials until 1945. Willis Cemetery, a separate cemetery on Marye's Heights, was established to serve local needs and predates the Civil War. This cemetery is distinguished from the Civil War burials by its brick wall. The Willis home, which burned down before the outbreak of war, was separated by a gap in the ridge from the Marye's family home, Brompton. Previously known as Willis Hill, the name Marye's Heights was applied to the whole of the ridge as the battle was covered by the national press in 1863.

Located near the 127th Pennsylvania Volunteer Monument, and throughout the cemetery, are plaques containing verses from Theodore O'Hara's 1847 poem "The Bivouac of the Dead". O'Hara wrote the poem to commemorate American dead at the Battle of Buena Vista, fought during the Mexican–American War. The first two octaves, and the first half of the eleventh octave are displayed in the cemetery:

The muffled drum's sad roll has beat

The soldier's last Tattoo;
No more on life's parade shall meet
That brave and fallen few.
On fame's eternal camping ground
Their silent tents to spread,
And glory guards, with solemn round
The bivouac of the dead.

No rumor of the foe's advance
Now swells upon the wind;
Nor troubled thought at midnight haunts
Of loved ones left behind;
No vision of the morrow's strife
The warrior's dreams alarms;
No braying horn or screaming fife
At dawn shall call to arms.

Rest on, embalmed and sainted dead,
Dear as the blood ye gave,
No impious footstep here shall tread

The herbage of your grave.

The following monuments and memorials are located in the Fredericksburg National Cemetery:

- 127th Pennsylvania Volunteer Monument
- Fifth Corps Monument (dedicated 1901)
- Humphreys' Division Monument
- Moesch Monument
- Parker's Battery Memorial

== Photo gallery ==
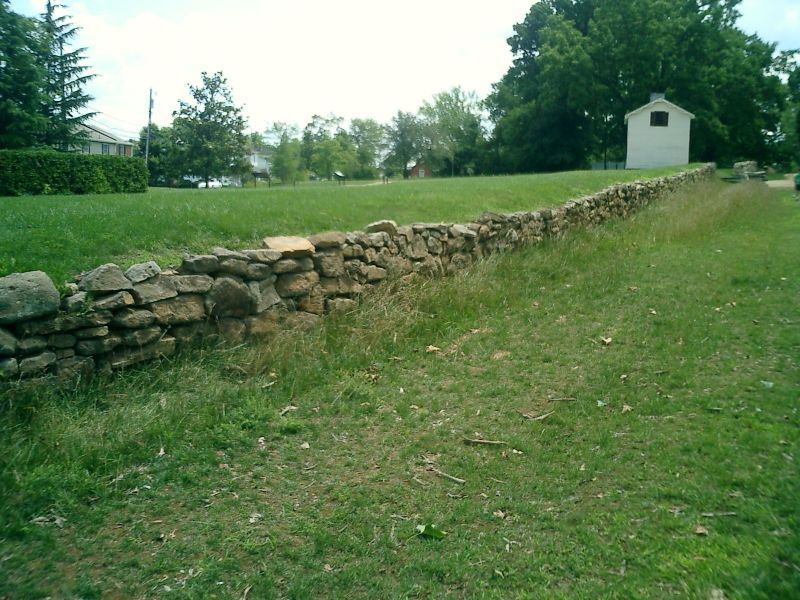
The stone wall and Sunken Road at the foot of Marye's Heights

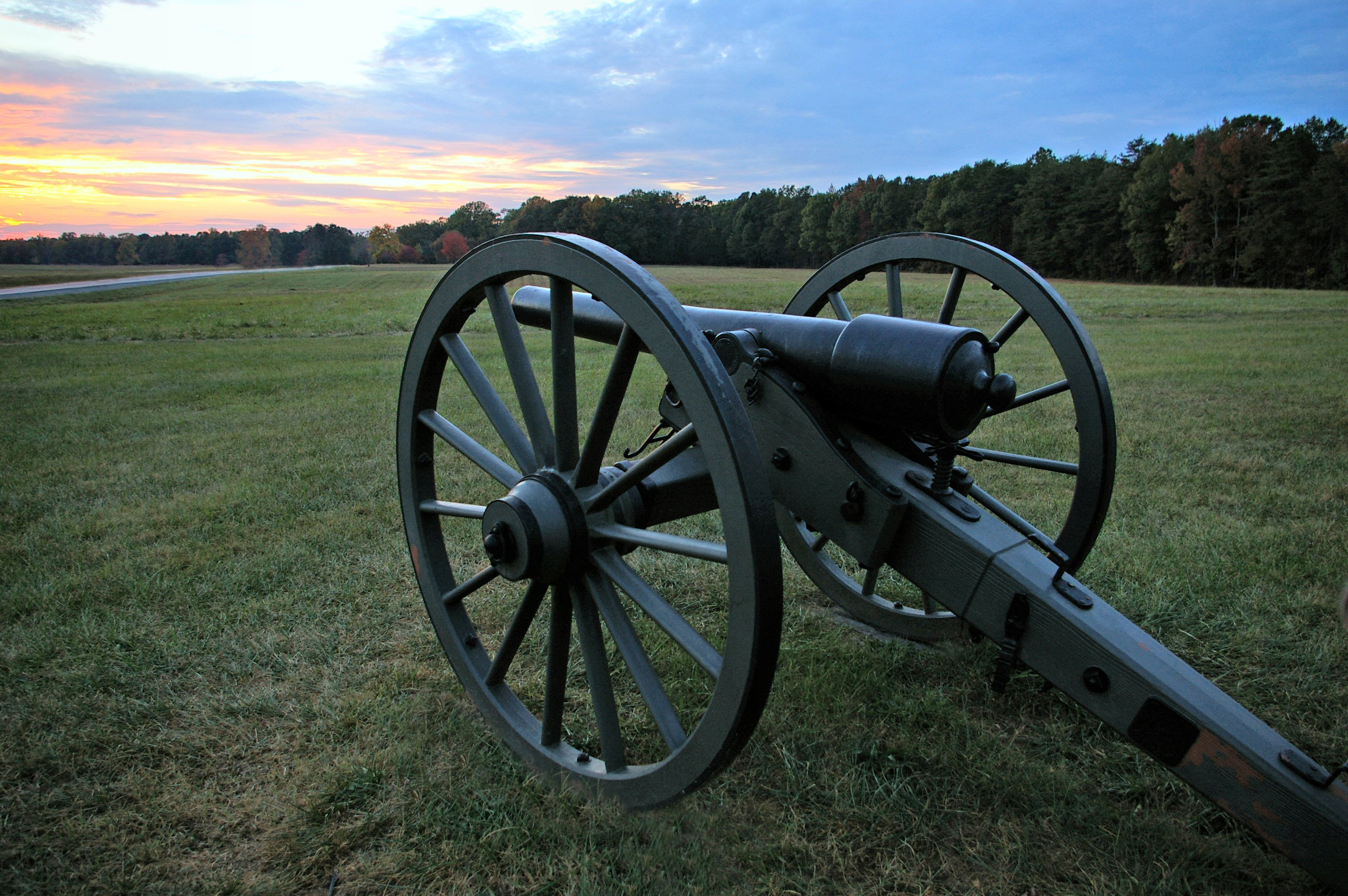
Cannon preserved at the Chancellorsville Battlefield

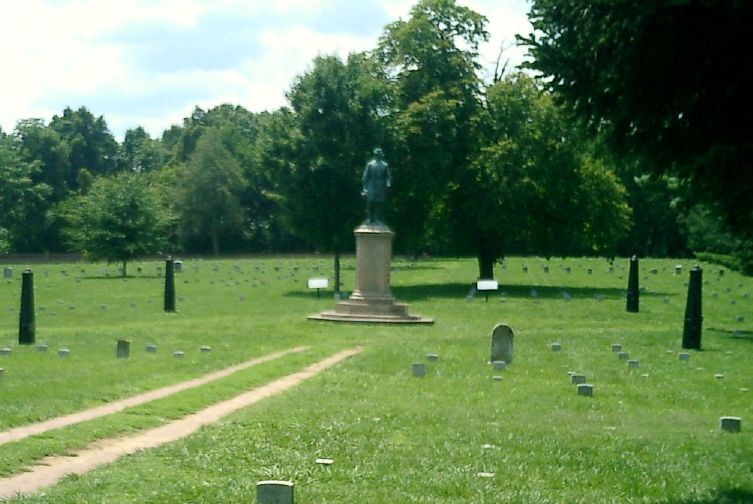
Humphreys' Division Monument (1908) is in the center of the cemetery

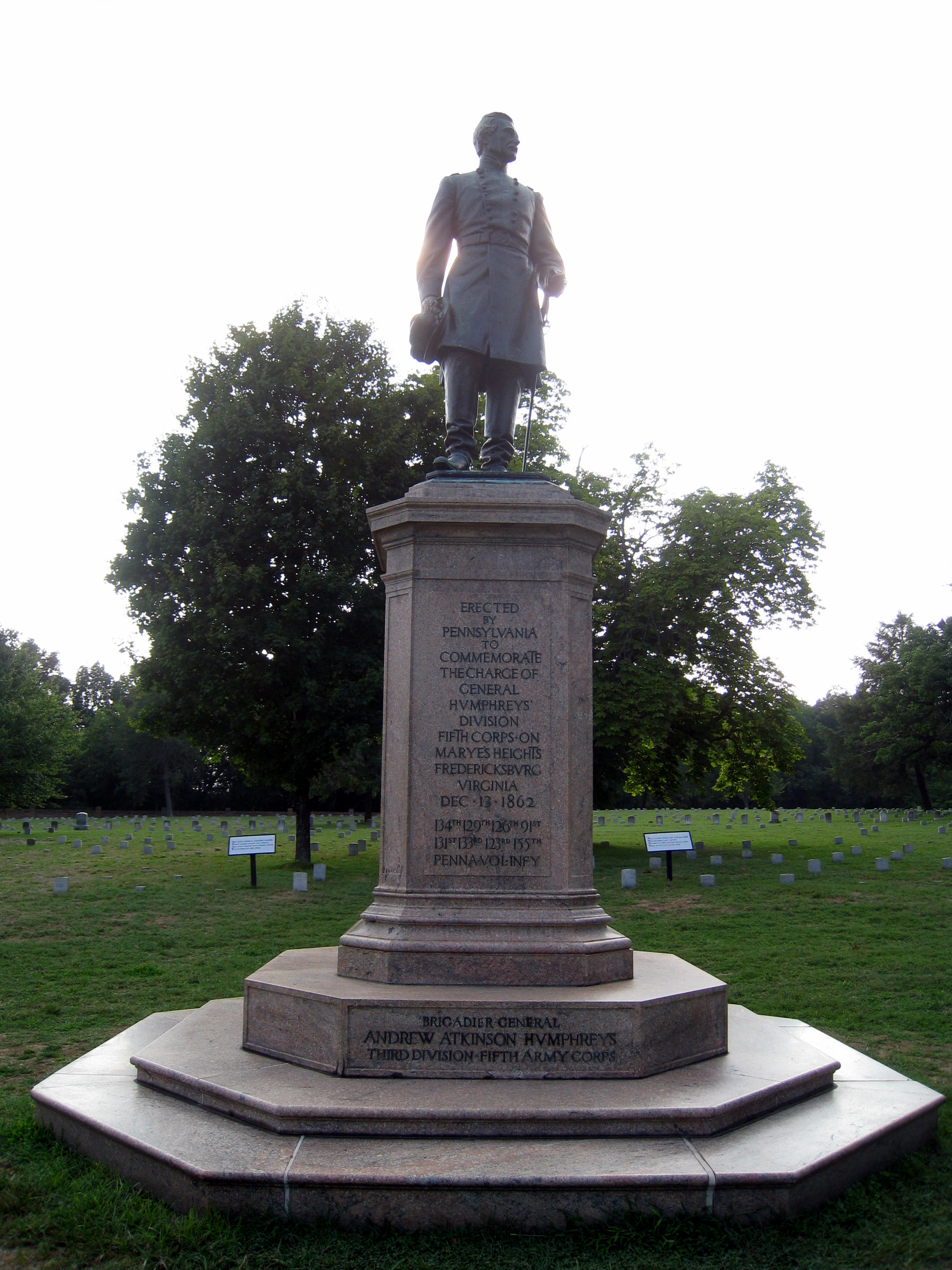
Closeup of Humphreys' Division Monument

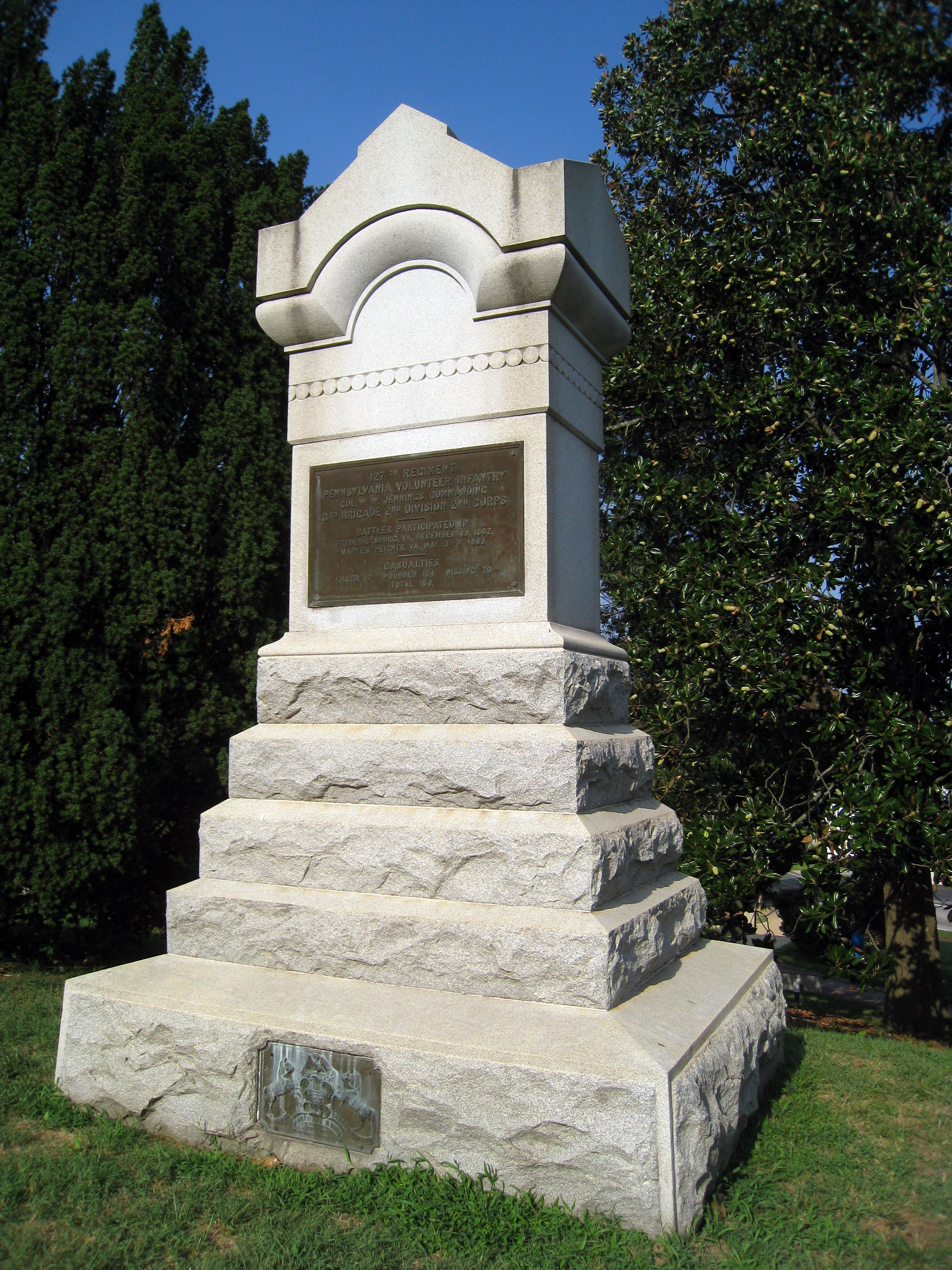
The 127th Pennsylvania Volunteer Monument

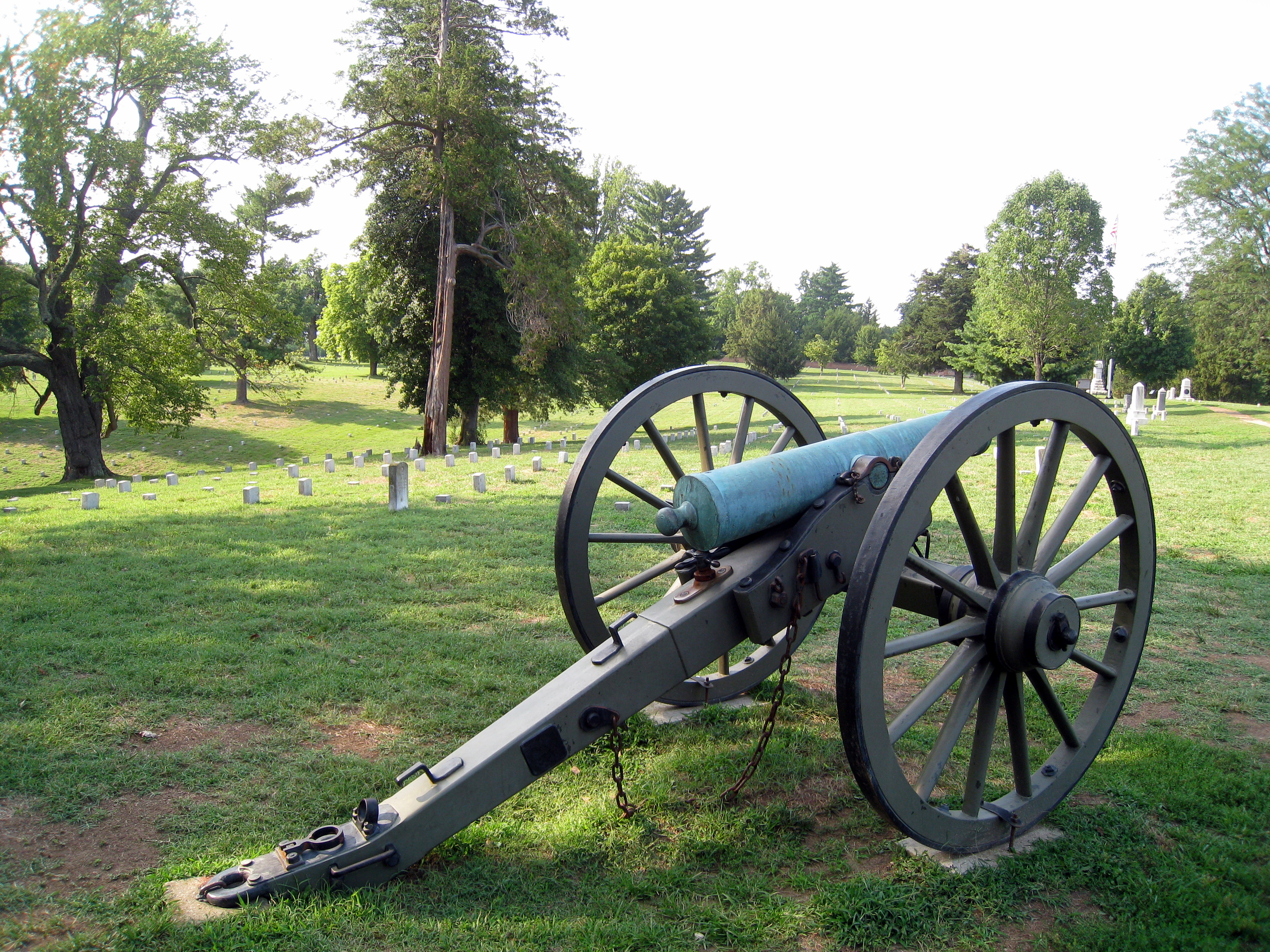
"Longstreet's Line" on Marye's Heights

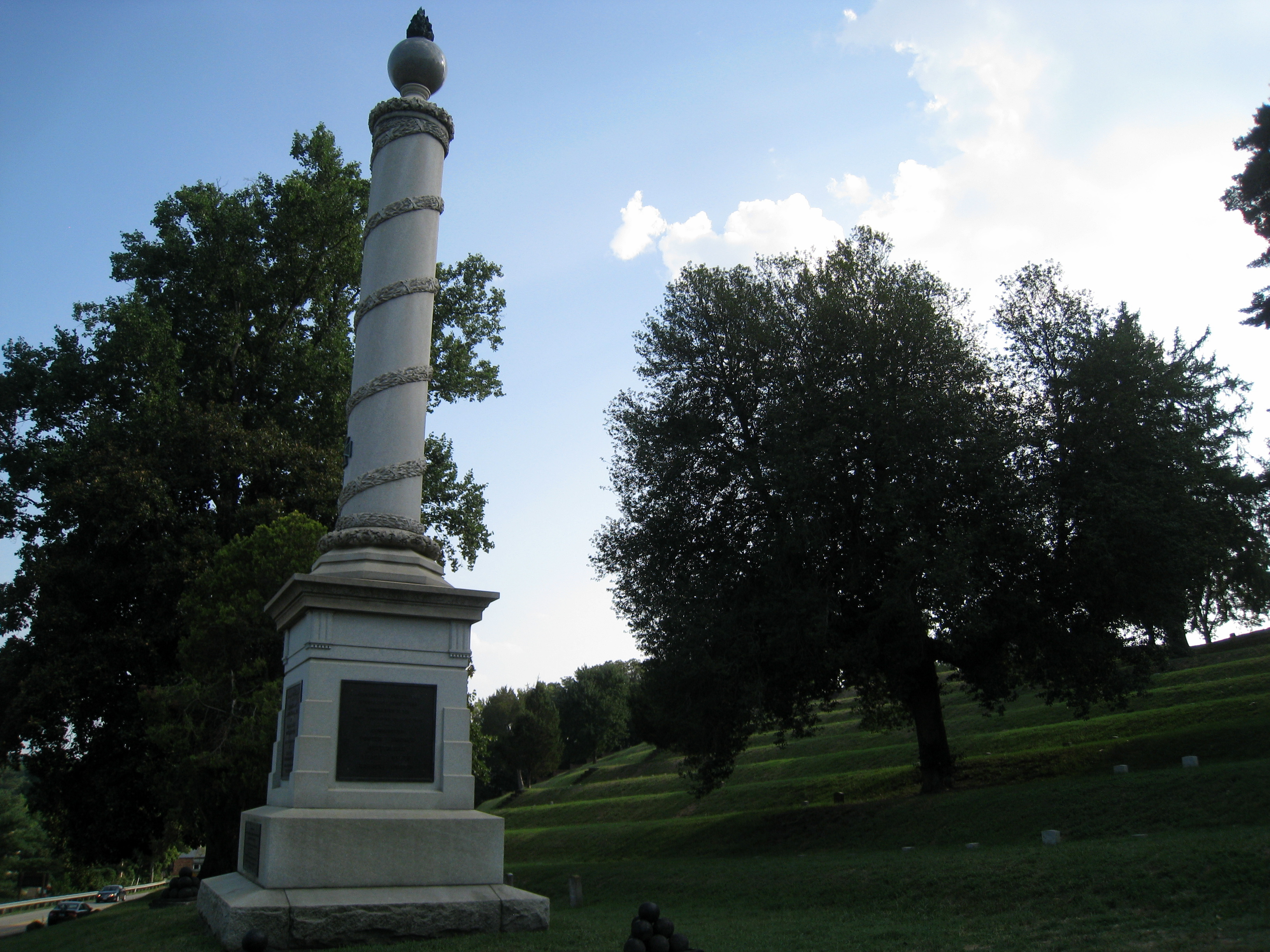
Fifth Corps Monument erected by Daniel Butterfield

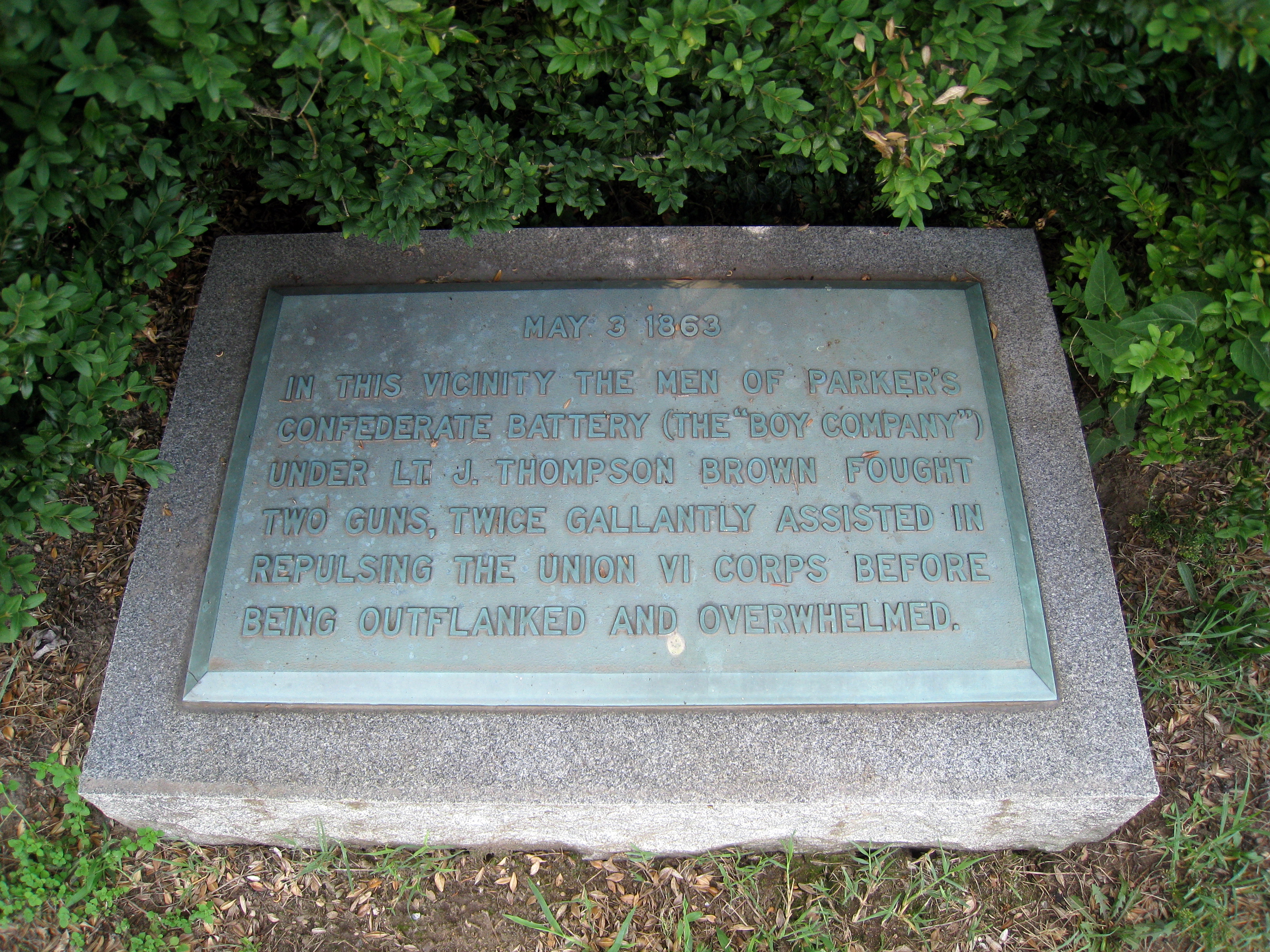
Parker's Battery Memorial

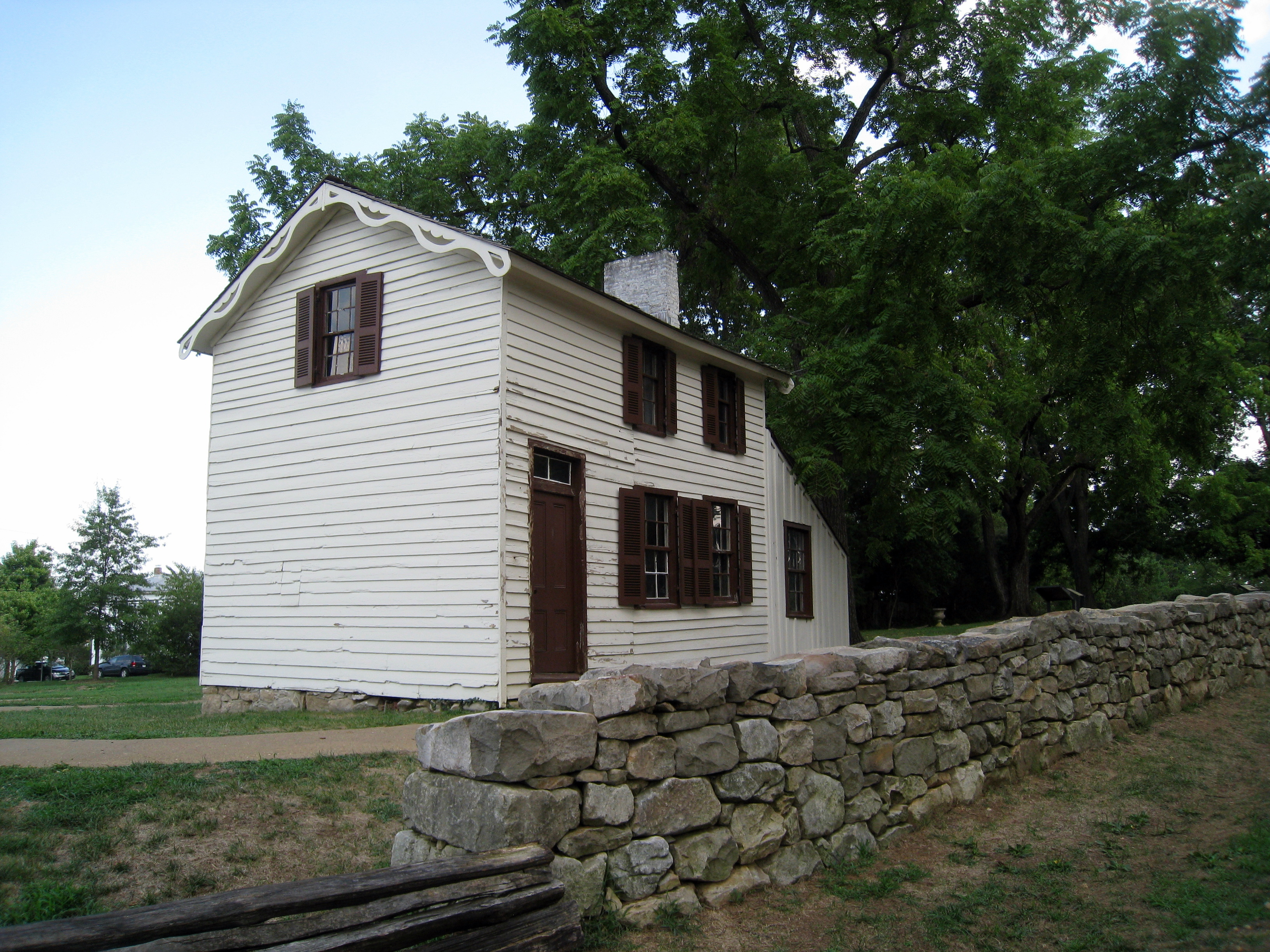
The Innis House and Sunken Road

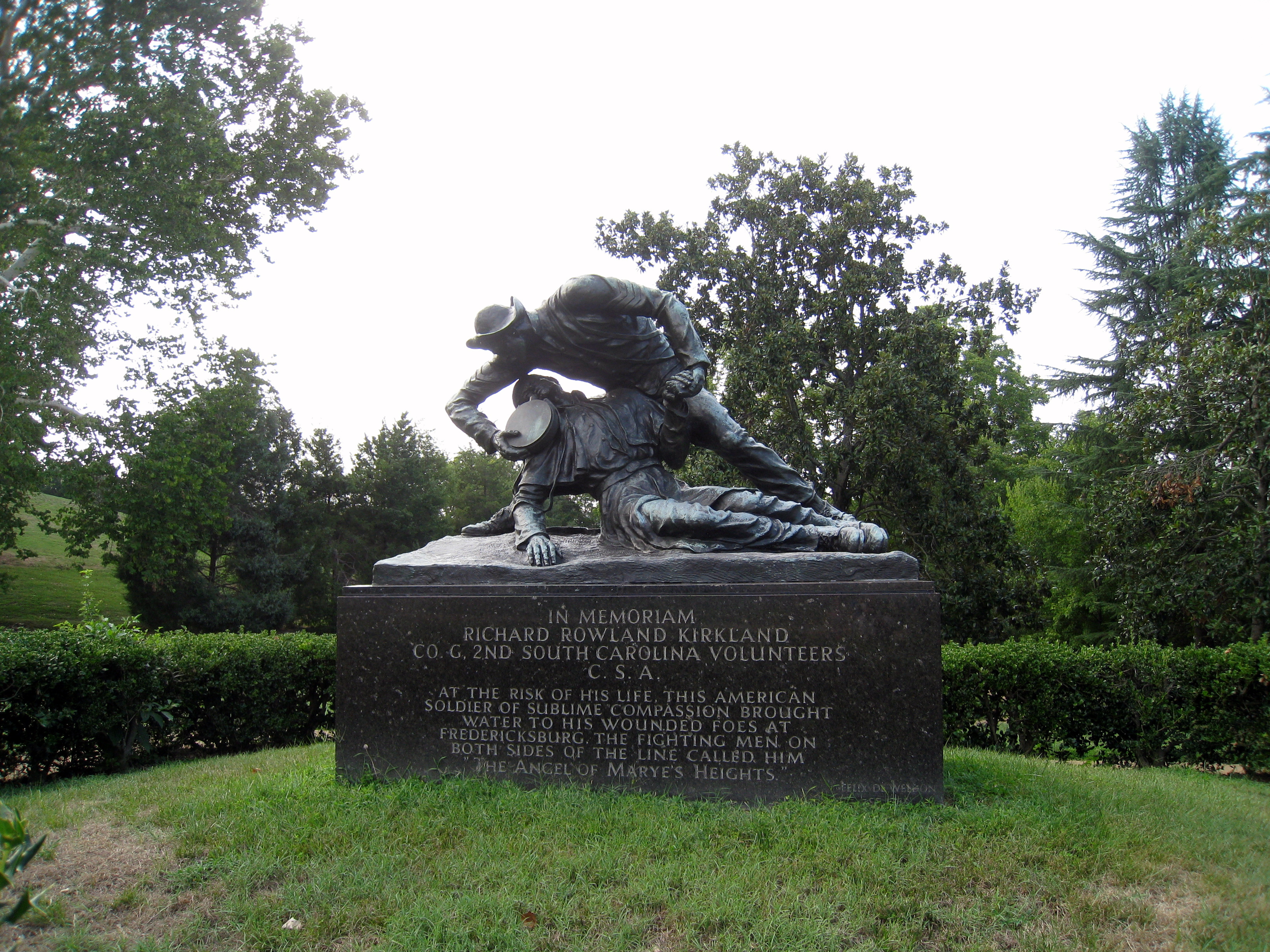
Richard Rowland Kirkland Monument (dedicated 1965)

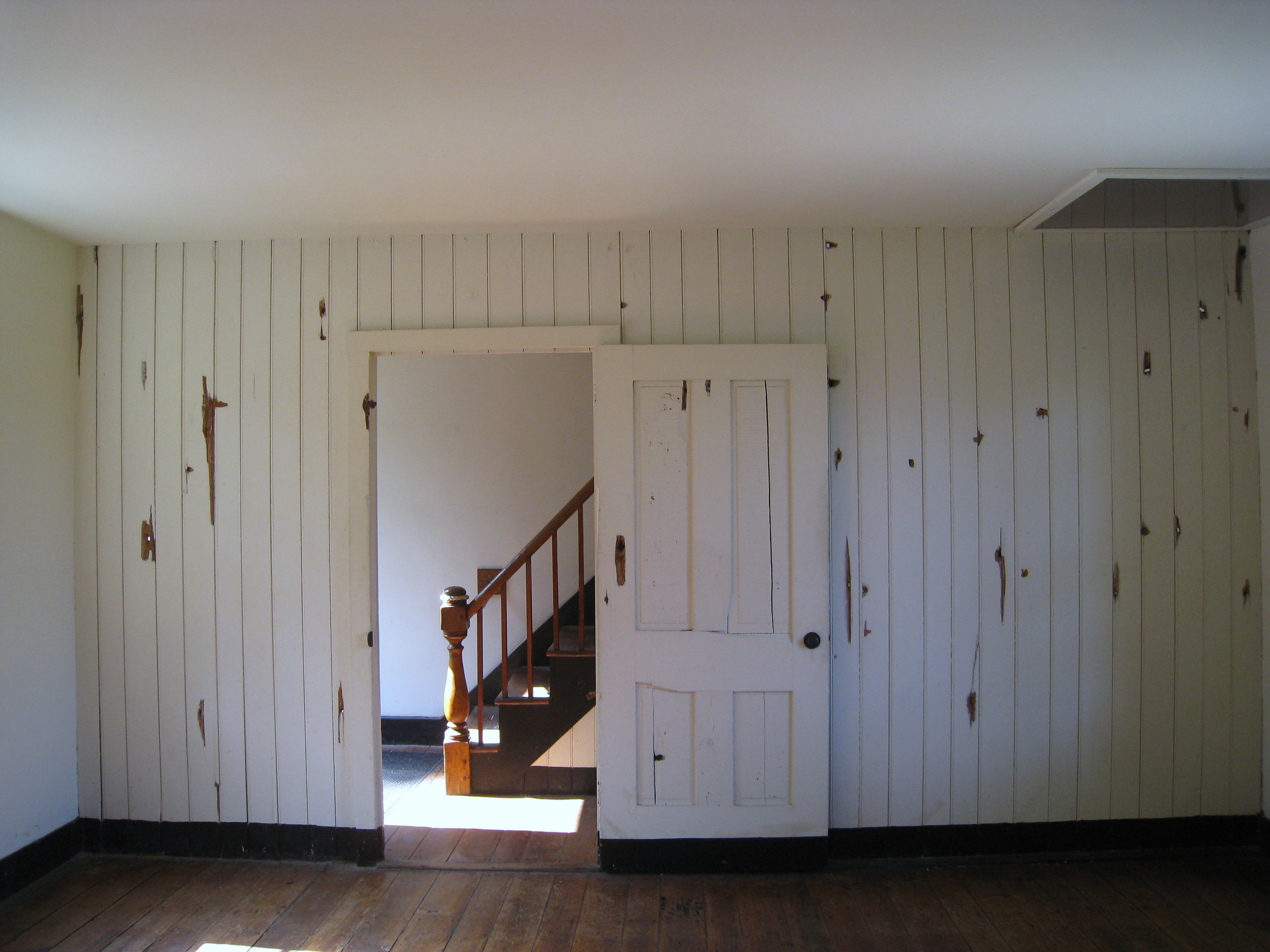
Original 1862 damage to the interior of the Innis House

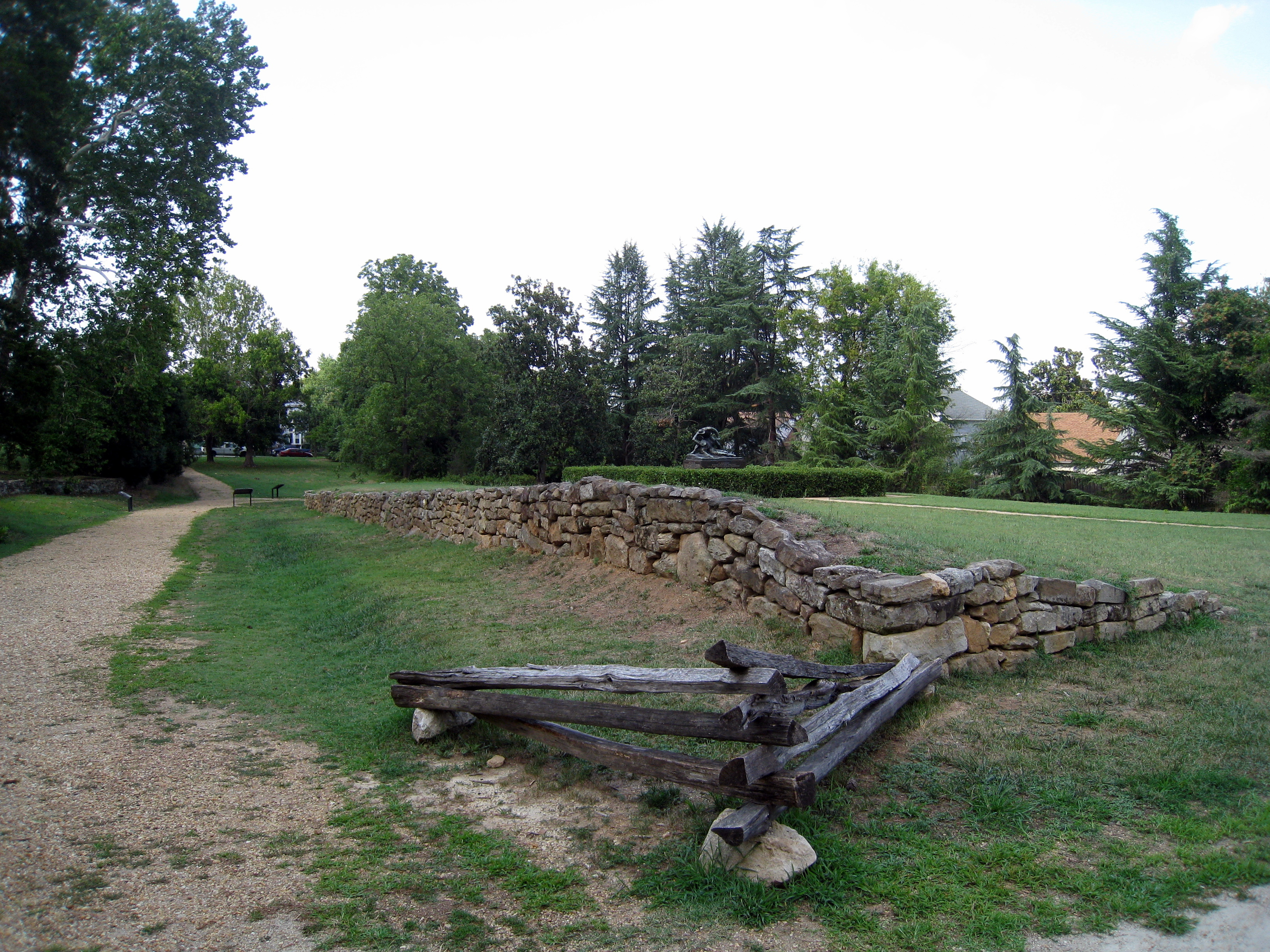
Only remaining original section of the Sunken Road's stone wall

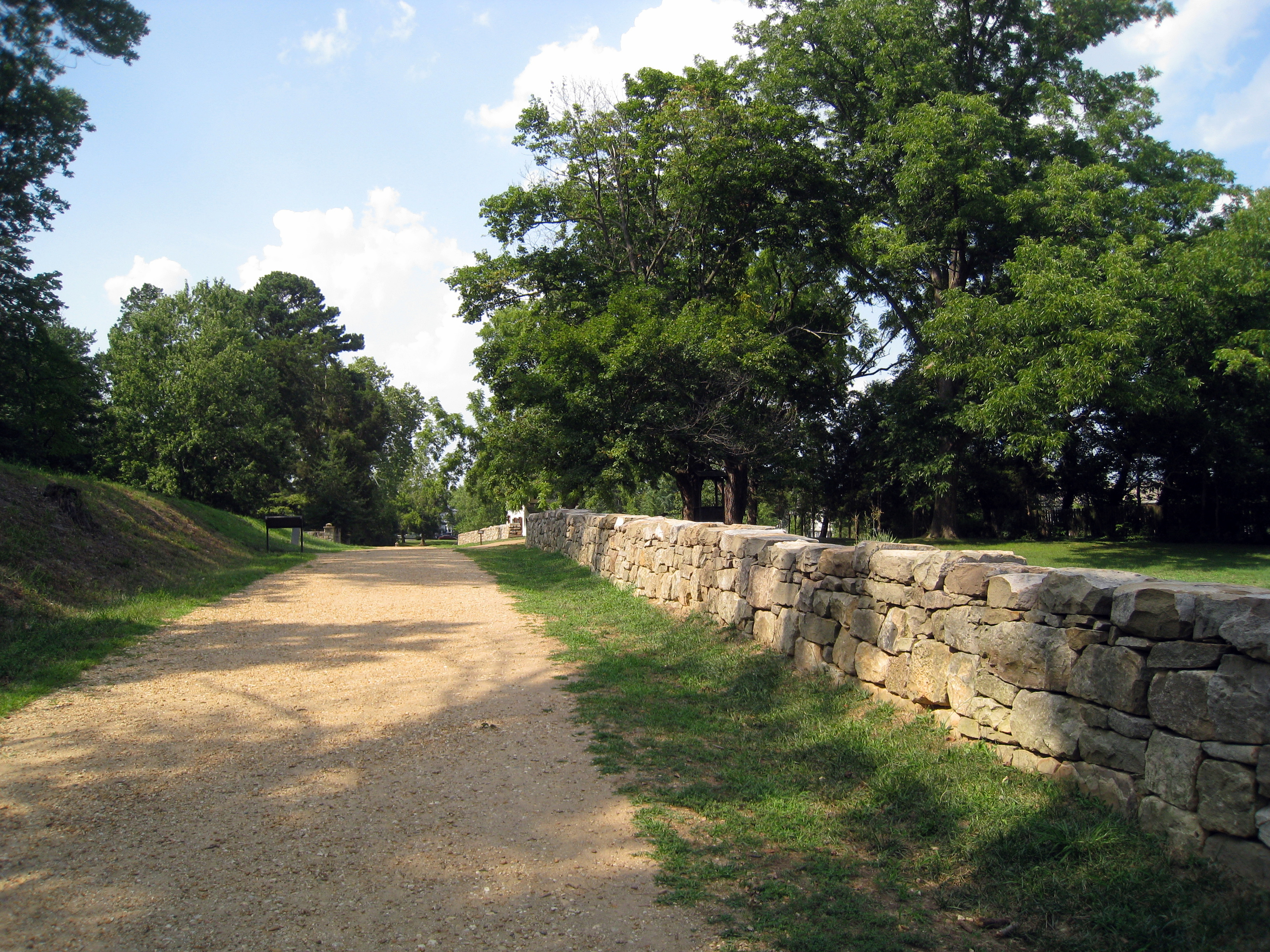
Sunken Road and a section of restored stone wall

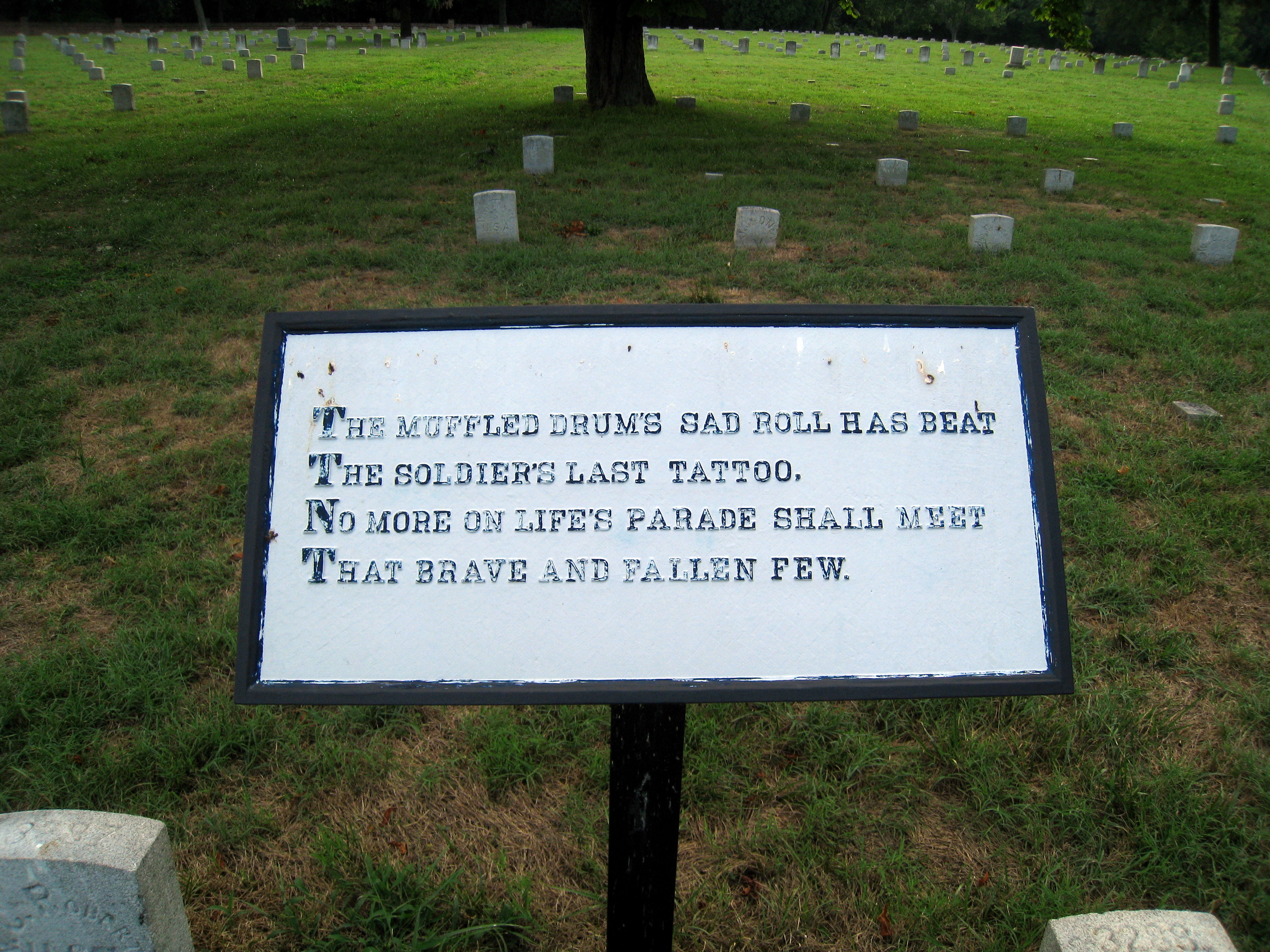
Plaque showing the first half of the first octave of Bivouac of the Dead

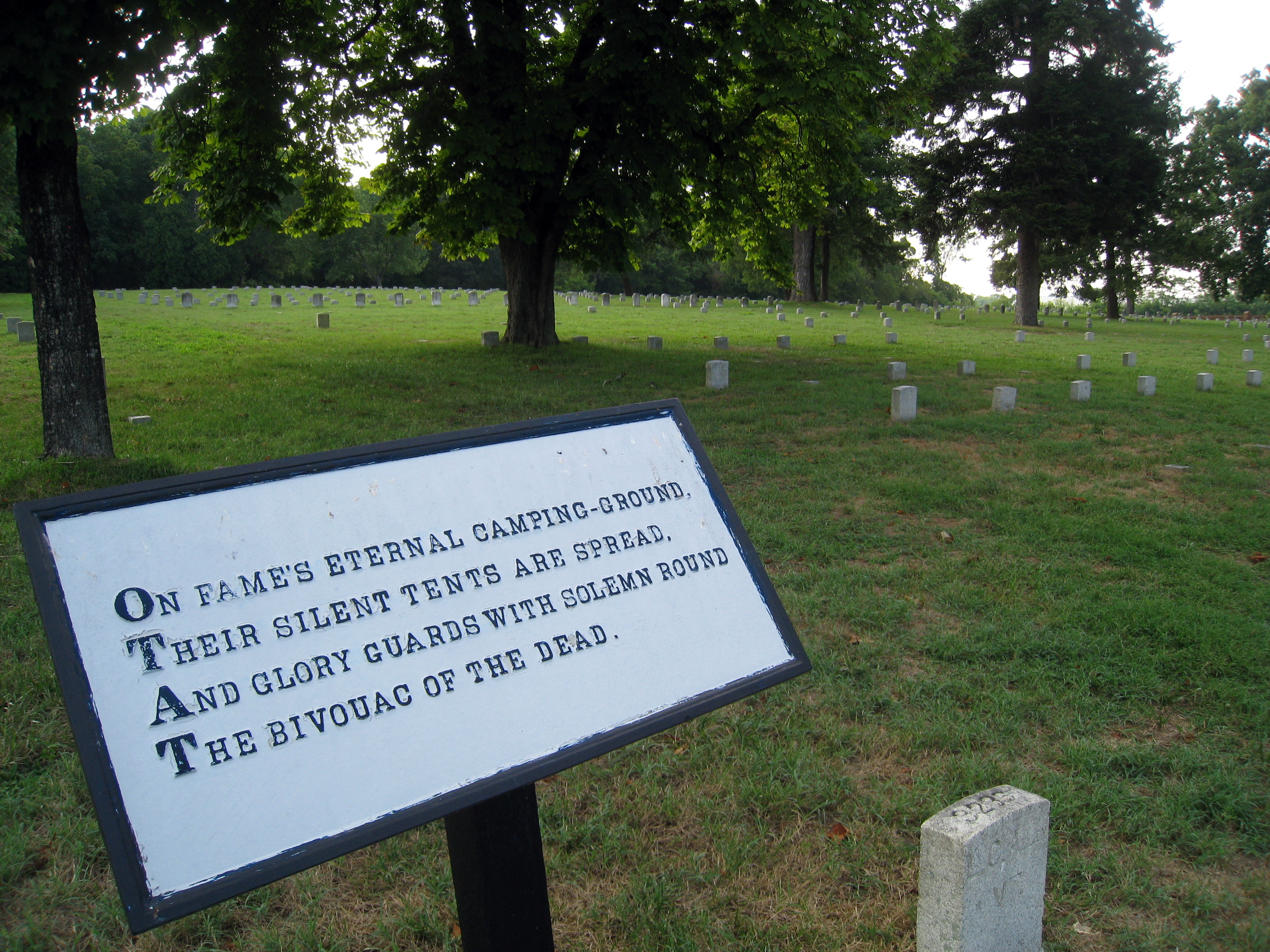
Plaque showing the second half of the first octave of Bivouac of the Dead

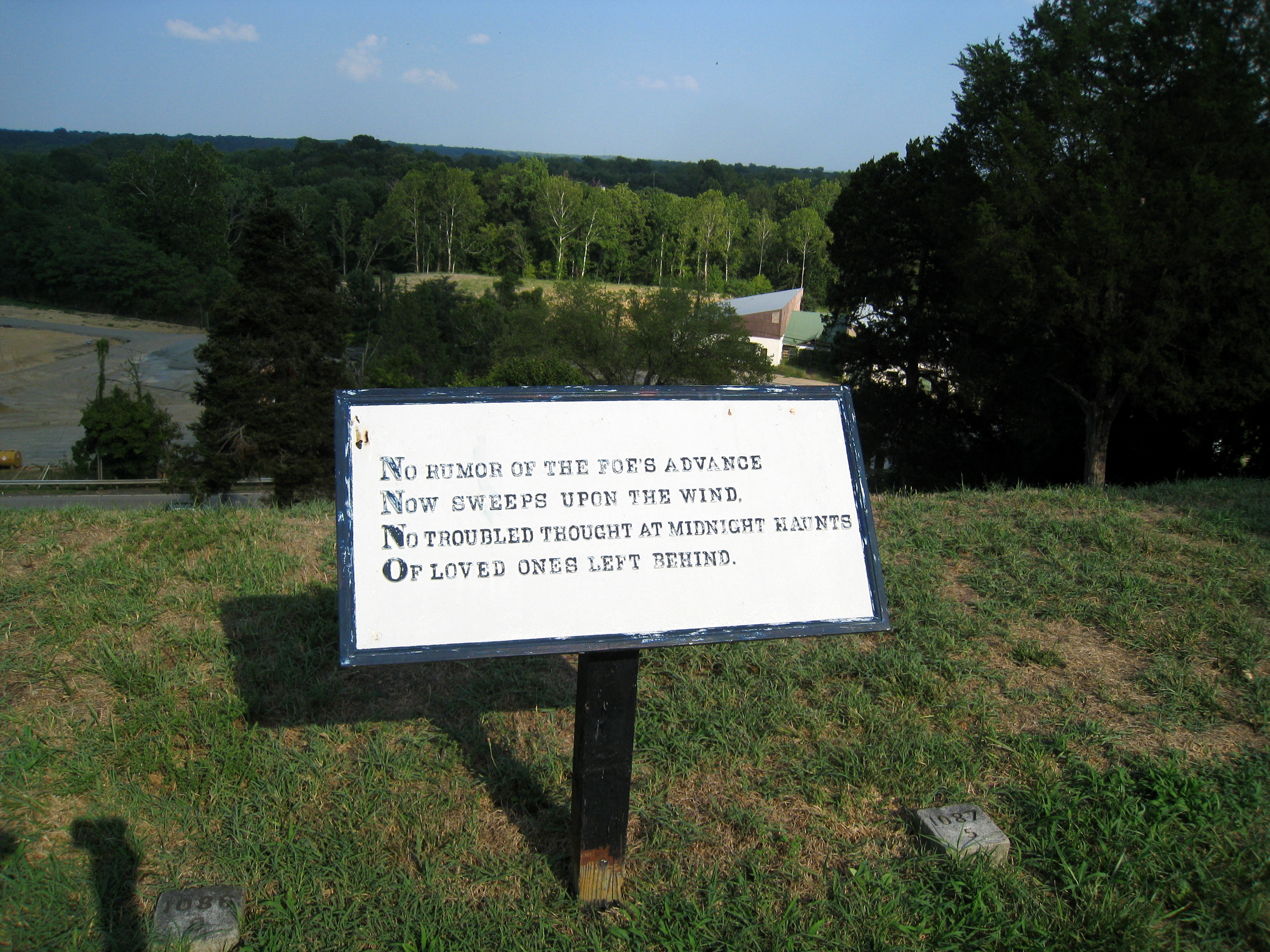
Plaque showing the first half of the second octave of Bivouac of the Dead

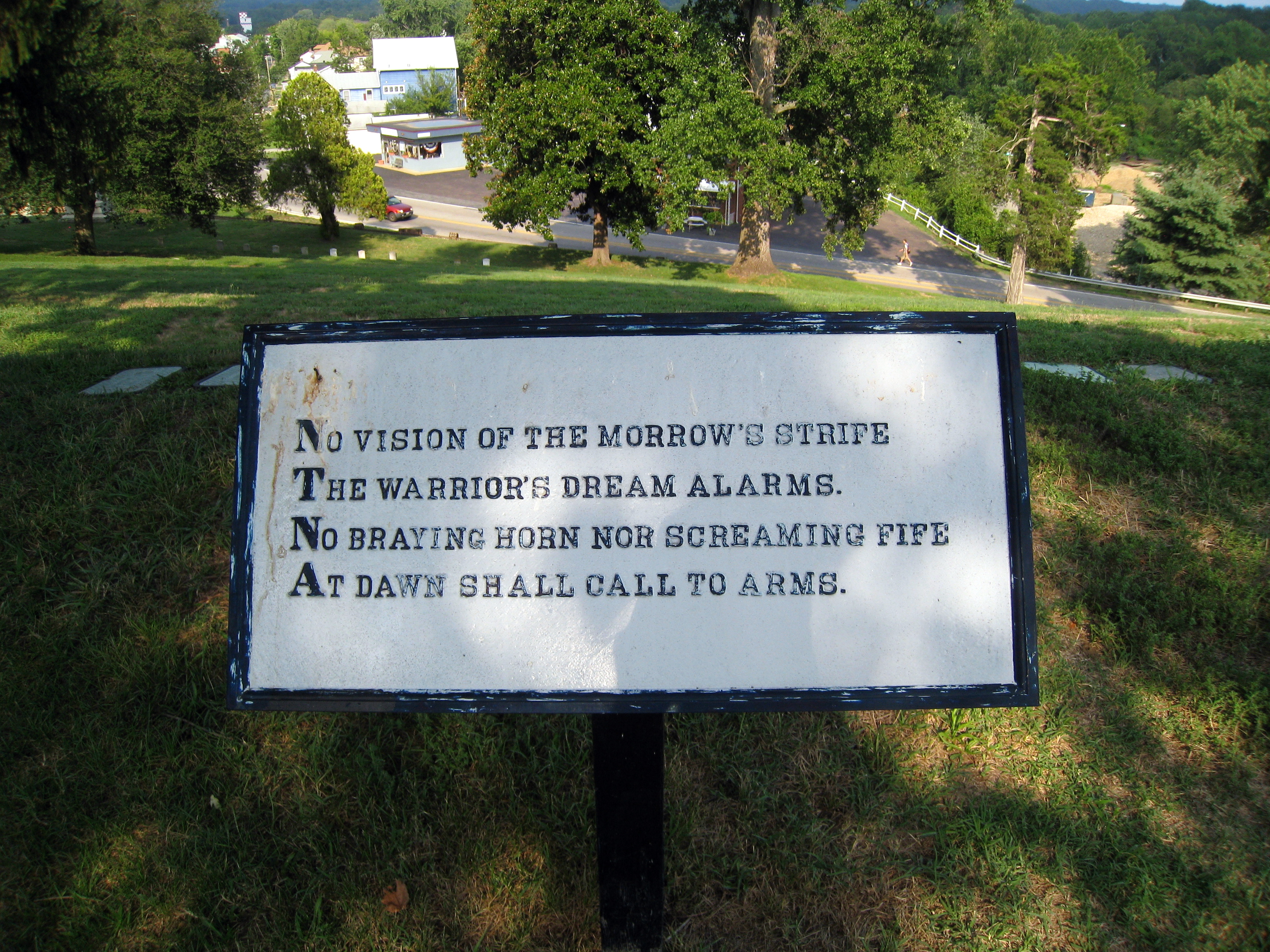
Plaque showing the second half of the second octave of Bivouac of the Dead

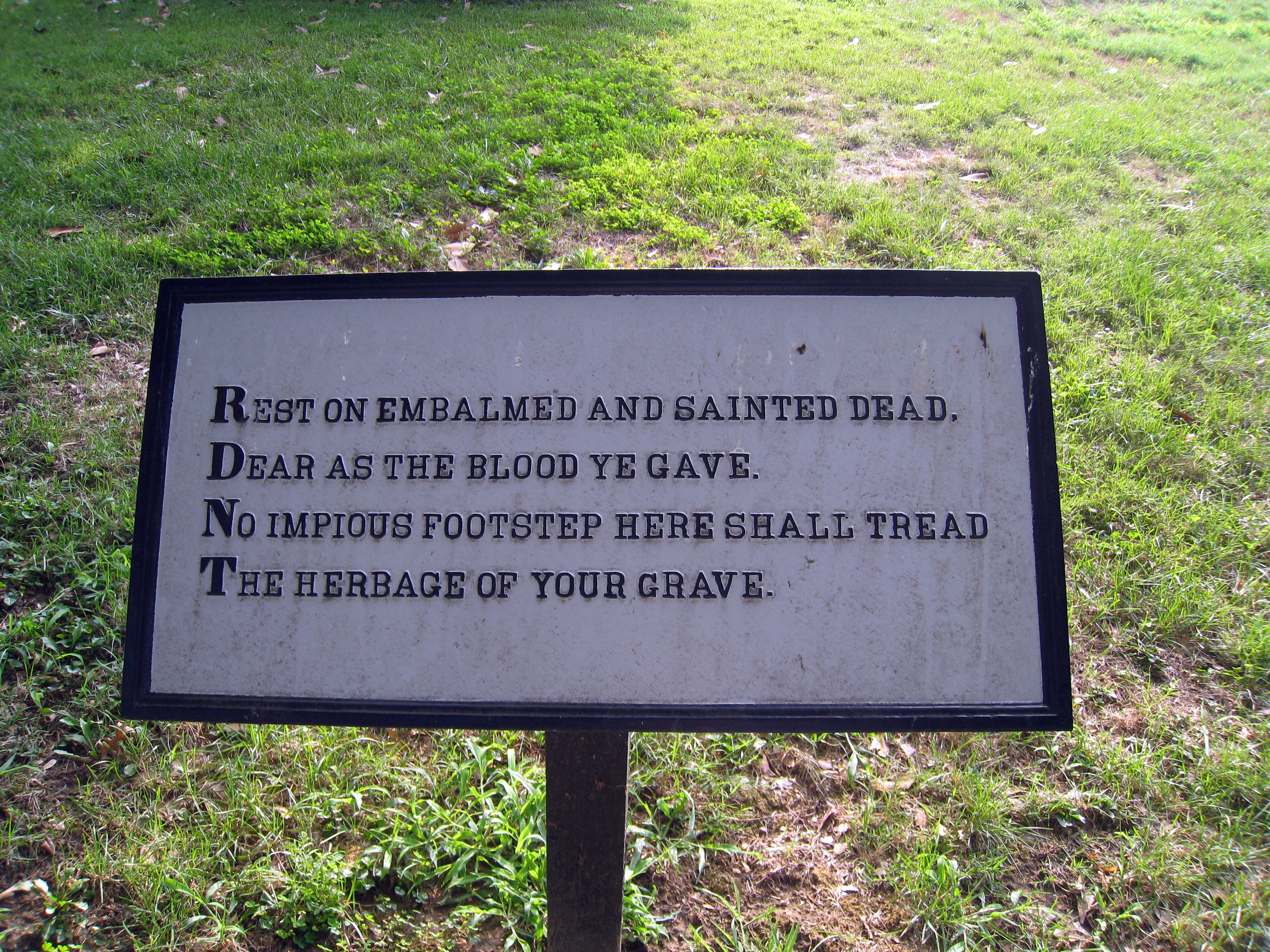
Plaque showing the first half of the eleventh octave of Bivouac of the Dead

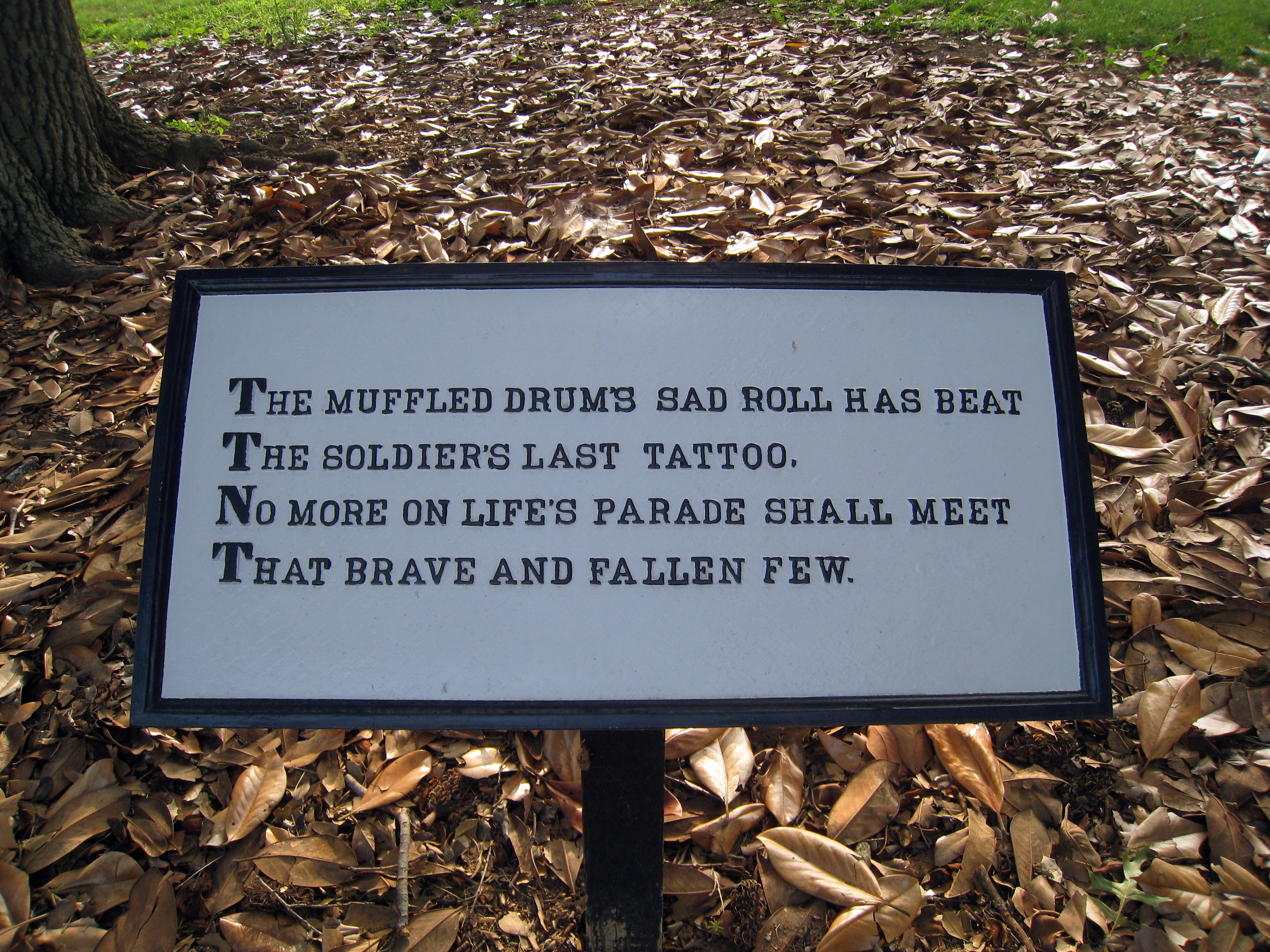
A second plaque showing the first half of the first octave of Bivouac of the Dead

== Other references ==
- The National Parks: Index 2001–2003. Washington: U.S. Department of the Interior.
