= Westville, South Carolina =

Unincorporated community in South Carolina, US

Coordinates: 34°27′25″N 80°35′56″W

Westville is an unincorporated community in Kershaw County, South Carolina, United States. It is part of the Columbia, South Carolina Metropolitan Statistical Area.

Before Westville got its name, it was known only as the West Section. In 1888, resident John C. West applied for the establishment of a post office and became the first postmaster. This post office officially changed its name to Westville in 1890.

Westville is located on U.S. Route 521, 16 miles north of Camden. The Westville Fire Station opened in 1976, and the Westville fire tower is one of the few still in use throughout the state of South Carolina.
