= John Doby Kennedy =

American politician (1840–1896)

John Doby
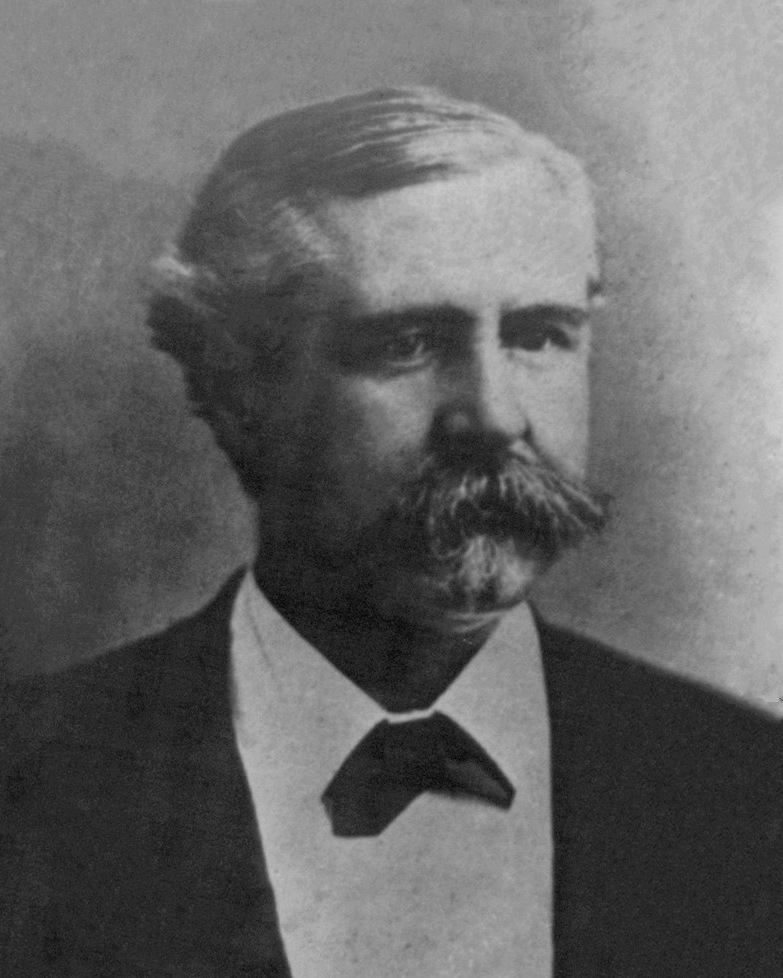

Consulate General of the United States, Shanghai
- In office 1886–1889
- President: Grover Cleveland
- Preceded by: Enoch J. Smithers
- Succeeded by: Joseph A. Leonard

57th Lieutenant Governor of South Carolina
- In office November 30, 1880 – December 1, 1882
- Governor: Johnson Hagood
- Preceded by: William Dunlap Simpson
- Succeeded by: John Calhoun Sheppard

Personal details
- Born: January 5, 1840 Camden, South Carolina, US
- Died: April 14, 1896 (aged 56) Camden, South Carolina, US
- Spouse(s): Elizabeth Cunningham; Harriett Boykin

Military service
- Allegiance: Confederate States of America
- Branch/service: Confederate States Army
- Years of service: 1861–1865
- Rank: Brigadier General
- Battles/wars: American Civil War; First Battle of Manassas; Peninsula Campaign; Battle of Savage's Station; Maryland Campaign; Battle of Antietam; Battle of Chancellorsville; Battle of Gettysburg; Carolinas campaign; Battle of Bentonville

John Doby Kennedy (January 5, 1840 – April 14, 1896) was a general in the Confederate States Army during the American Civil War, as well as a post-war planter, attorney, politician, and the 57th lieutenant governor of South Carolina serving under Governor Johnson Hagood.

== Early life and career ==
Kennedy was born in Camden, South Carolina. His father was an immigrant from Scotland who had settled in Kershaw County about 1830 and married a local woman. Kennedy served as a lieutenant in a Camden pre-war militia unit. He studied at South Carolina College from 1855 to 1857. On October 28, 1857, he married Elizabeth Cunningham, and they eventually had 7 children. Kennedy read law under William Zachariah Leitner and was admitted to the bar in January 1861. However, South Carolina's secession and the subsequent outbreak of the Civil War delayed his plans to establish a law practice.

== Civil War ==
Enlisting in the Confederate Army in April 1861, Kennedy became captain of Company E, 2nd South Carolina Infantry Regiment, under fellow Camden resident Col. Joseph Brevard Kershaw. At the First Battle of Manassas, he was struck by a Minie ball and badly wounded. Recovering, he was promoted to colonel when Kershaw was promoted to brigadier general. Kennedy's first action in command of a regiment occurred at a skirmish on the Nine-Mile Road near Richmond, Virginia, in June 1862 during the Peninsula Campaign. After fighting at the Battle of Savage's Station, he was disabled for several weeks by fever. He returned to his regiment in time for the Maryland Campaign. During Stonewall Jackson's investment of Harpers Ferry, Kennedy was with Kershaw's brigade in the capture of the important Maryland Heights. He led his regiment in Kershaw's counterattack during the Battle of Antietam, driving a part of the Union II Corps before him. However, he fell painfully wounded in the first charge, struck in the instep and Achilles tendon while crossing a wooden fence along the Hagerstown Pike. Once again recovering in time for a major battle, Kennedy led the 2nd and 8th South Carolina to the support of Gen. Howell Cobb at Marye's Heights, the focus of the hottest fighting at Fredericksburg.

In 1863, Kennedy efficiently led his regiment during the battles of Chancellorsville and Gettysburg. During 1864, when not disabled, he was either in command of his regiment or of Kershaw's old brigade during the Richmond and Shenandoah Valley campaigns. In December he was promoted to the temporary rank of brigadier general; and continued to command the brigade when it was transferred down south. He took part in the Carolinas campaign against William T. Sherman, including the Battle of Bentonville, and surrendered with Johnston's army at Greensboro.

Kennedy survived six wounds during his service to the Confederacy, and was hit fifteen times by spent balls.

== Postbellum activities ==
After the close of hostilities, Kennedy was mainly engaged in planting until 1877, when he finally established a law practice. He was an active member of the Kershaw Lodge #29 of the Freemasons in Camden. Elected to Congress in 1865, Kennedy declined to take the "ironclad" oath of allegiance demanded and did not take his seat. After his first wife died in 1876, Kennedy married Harriet A. Boykin and had an additional child. In 1878–79, he represented Kershaw County in the state legislature. He was elected Lieutenant Governor of South Carolina in 1880 and served until 1882 under Governor Johnson Hagood when he unsuccessfully ran for Governor. Kennedy became Grand Master of South Carolina Masons in 1881–83. In 1884, he was a presidential elector-at-large on the Democratic ticket. In 1886, President Grover Cleveland appointed him as United States Consul General in Shanghai, China. Returning from that post in 1889, Kennedy continued the practice of law at Camden until his death from a stroke. He was buried in Camden's Quaker Cemetery.

A United Daughters of the Confederacy chapter was named for him. In 1911, Camden officials erected the Confederate Memorial Fountain, a six-sided structure with tablets on each column commemorating Kennedy and five other generals born in Kershaw County.

== See also ==
- List of American Civil War Generals (Confederate)

== Notes ==
Political offices
Preceded by William Dunlap Simpson	Lieutenant Governor of South Carolina; 1880–1882	Succeeded by John Calhoun Sheppard
