= Joseph B. Kershaw =

American politician (1822–1894)

Joseph Brevard Kershaw
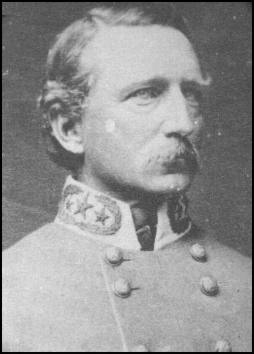
- Born: January 5, 1822; Camden, South Carolina, U.S.
- Died: April 13, 1894 (aged 72) Camden, South Carolina, U.S.
- Buried: Old Quaker Cemetery; Camden, South Carolina, U.S.
- Allegiance: United States; Confederate States of America
- Branch: United States Army; Confederate States Army
- Service years: 1847–1848 (USV); 1861–1865 (CSA)
- Rank: First Lieutenant (USV); Major General (CSA)
- Conflicts: Mexican–American War: Battle of Chapultepec; American Civil War: Battle of Fort Sumter; First Battle of Manassas; Battle of Fredericksburg; Battle of Gettysburg; Battle of Chickamauga; Battle of the Wilderness; Battle of Spotsylvania Court House; Battle of Cold Harbor; Shenandoah campaign

Joseph Brevard Kershaw (January 5, 1822 – April 13, 1894) was an American planter from South Carolina. He was also a lawyer, judge, and a Confederate general in the American Civil War.

== Early life ==
Kershaw was born on January 5, 1822, at his family's plantation in Camden, Kershaw County, South Carolina. Admitted to the bar in 1843, he married Lucretia Ann Douglas in Camden in 1844, and was a member of the South Carolina Senate in 1852–1856. Kershaw saw battle during the Mexican–American War, but fell deathly ill and was given leave to return home.

== Civil War ==
At the start of the Civil War, Kershaw commanded the 2nd South Carolina Infantry Regiment. He was present at Morris Island in April 1861 during the Battle of Fort Sumter, and then in July 1861 at the First Battle of Manassas in Virginia as part of Brig. Gen. Milledge Bonham's brigade. During the battle, Kershaw's regiment along with the 8th South Carolina was detached from Bonham and sent to help drive back the Union assault on Henry House Hill.

Afterwards, Kershaw gained the ire of Confederate general P.G.T. Beauregard by failing to file a proper report of the battle and instead writing a lengthy article in a Charleston newspaper which gave the impression that he and the 2nd South Carolina singlehandedly defeated the Union army. Beauregard, who had difficult professional relationships with many military and political officials, called him "that militia idiot". The disparaging remarks of Beauregard toward him and other officers were duly noted.

Due in part to his military success, Kershaw was transferred to the West in the fall. In December, when Milledge Bonham resigned his commission to take a seat in the Confederate Congress, Kershaw was honored with command of Bonham's former brigade.

He was commissioned brigadier general on 13 February 1862 and commanded a brigade in Joseph E. Johnston's Army of Northern Virginia during the Peninsula Campaign, at the close of which he continued with Lee and took part in the Northern Virginia Campaign and Maryland Campaign. During the Battle of Fredericksburg, on December 13, 1862, he commanded his South Carolina Brigade and was stationed behind Ransom's North Carolina Brigade and Cobb's Georgia brigade on Marye's Heights, and helped repulse several attacks made by the Union Army.

The following year he was engaged in the Battle of Gettysburg and then was transferred with Lt. Gen. James Longstreet's corps to the West, where he took part in the charge that destroyed the Federal right wing at Chickamauga. After the relief of McLaws following the battle of Knoxville Kershaw was given the command of the division and promoted to major general on 2 June 1864. When Longstreet returned to Virginia, he commanded a division in the battles of the Wilderness, Spotsylvania Court House, and Cold Harbor, and was engaged in the Shenandoah campaign of 1864 against Maj. Gen. Philip Sheridan. After the evacuation of Richmond, his troops formed part of Lt. Gen. Richard S. Ewell's corps, which was captured on 6 April 1865 at the Battle of Sayler's Creek.

== Postbellum career ==
At the close of the war he returned to South Carolina and in 1865 was chosen president of the State Senate. He was judge of the Circuit Court from 1877 to 1893, when he stepped down for health reasons. In 1894, he was appointed postmaster of Camden, an office that he held until his death in the same year. Joseph B. Kershaw was also Grand Master of the Freemasons of South Carolina. He died in Camden and is buried there in the Quaker Cemetery.

== Ancestry ==
Ancestors of Joseph B. Kershaw

16. James Kershaw
8. Joseph Kershaw (b. 1699)
4. Col. Joseph Kershaw (1728–1791)
18. John Ryley
9. Mary Ryley (1703–1742)
2. John Kershaw (1765–1829)
20. John Mathis (1690–1779)
10. Daniel Mathis (1723–1764)
21. Alice Andrews (1696–1784)
5. Sarah Mathis (1763–1789)
11. Sophia Gaunt (1723–1761)
1. Joseph Brevard Kershaw (1822–1894)
12. Isaac DuBose (1746–1815)
6. Isaac DuBose
13. Catherine Beisseau
3. Harriette Du Bose (1791–1845)
7. Mary DuTarque

== Children ==
Joseph Brevard Kershaw (5 January 1822 Camden – 13 April 1894 Camden) married in 1844 in Camden to Lucretia Ann Douglas (27 August 1825 Camden, Kershaw County, South Carolina, USA - 28 April 1902 Camden), youngest of the four surviving daughters of the esteemed James Kennedy Douglas (23 October 1780 Minnigaff, Kirkcudbrightshire, Scotland - 13 November 1860 Camden) by his wife Mary Lucretia Martin (21 February 1785 - 29 March 1852 Camden). James, son of William Douglas and his wife Sarah Kennedy, had emigrated in 1800/1804 to join John Kirkpatrick, an established merchant in Charleston, South Carolina. Joseph and Lucretia's children included:

- Rev. John Kershaw (3 January 1847 Camden - 6 April 1921 North Augusta, Aiken County, South Carolina), married Susan B. DeSaussure (8 June 1847 Charleston, Charleston County, South Carolina - 26 December 1924 Charleston) and had issue; his daughter Harriette Kershaw Leiding was a noted Charleston writer.
- Mary Martin Kershaw (23 April 1848 Camden - 14 April 1934 Charlotte, Mecklenburg County, North Carolina), married Charles John Shannon (1846–1933) and had issue;
- Harriet DuBose Kershaw (14 October 1850 Camden - 5 May 1930 Columbia, Richland County, South Carolina), married Thomas Whitmill Lang (10 January 1848 Dallas County, Alabama - 9 September 1915 Columbia) without surviving issue;
- Charlotte Douglas Kershaw (17 April 1851 Camden - 8 March 1923 Camden), never married, no issue;
- Josephine Serre Kershaw (8 April 1867 Camden - 10 September 1938 Pawleys Island, Georgetown County, South Carolina), married William Bratton deLoach (18 May 1866 - 5 February 1929) and had issue.

== See also ==
- List of American Civil War generals (Confederate)
