= Corey Jackson (athlete) =

American basketball and football player (born 1978)

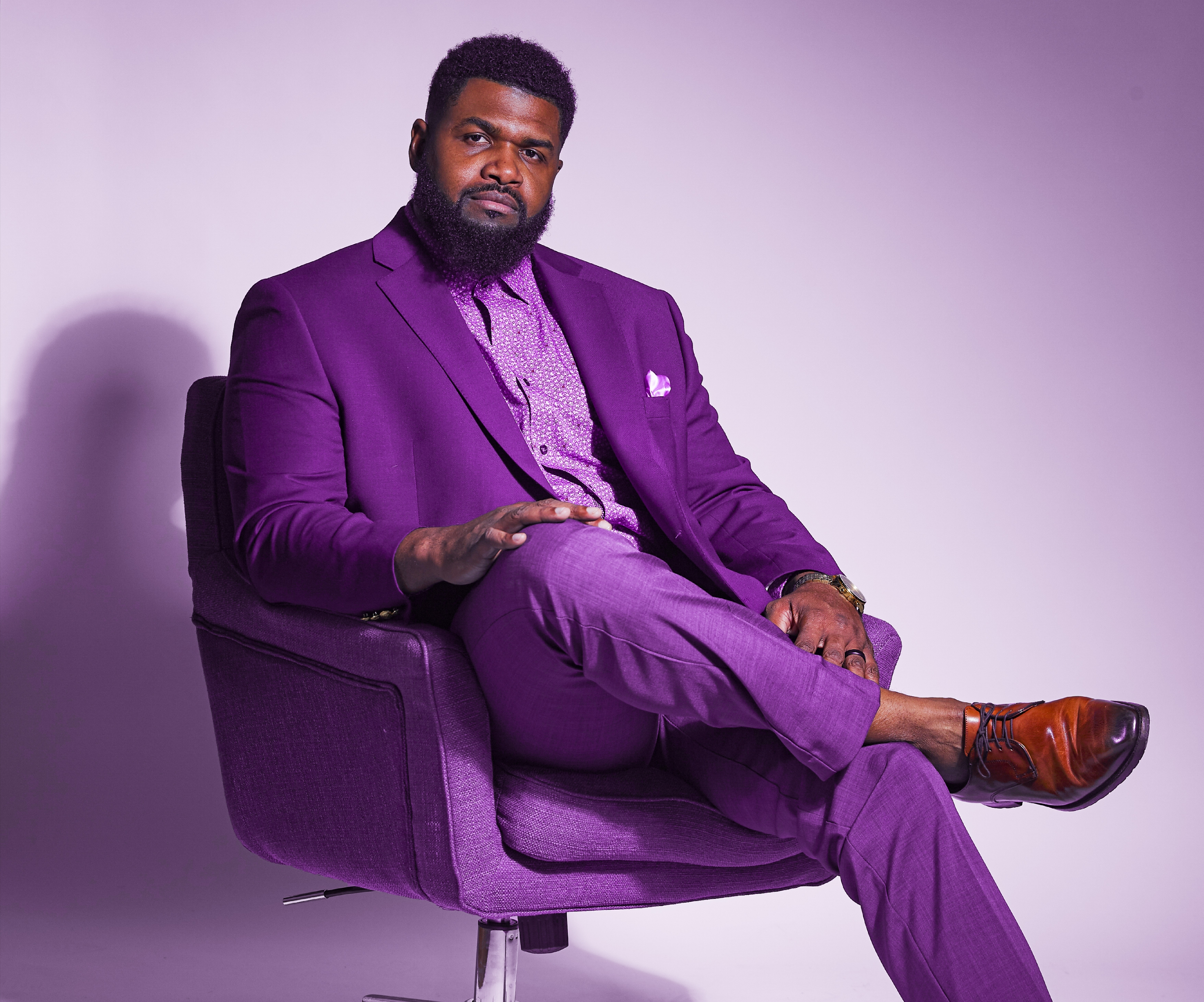
- Corey Jackson
- Born: November 6, 1978 (age 48); Camden, South Carolina
- Height: 6 ft 6 in (198 cm)
- Basketball career

Career information
- High school: North Central (Kershaw, South Carolina)
- College: Ranger (1998–2000); Nevada (2000–2002)
- Position: Forward
- Number: 30
- Football career

No. 98, 90
- Position: Defensive end

Personal information
- Listed weight: 255 lb (116 kg)

Career information
- College: Nevada (2000–2002)
- NFL draft: 2003: undrafted

Career history
- Cleveland Browns (2003–2004); Frankfurt Galaxy (2004); Denver Broncos (2005–2006)*; New York Dragons (2007)
- * Offseason or practice squad member only

Awards and highlights
- NFL Europe Defensive MVP (2004)
- Stats at Pro Football Reference
- Stats at ArenaFan.com

Andrick Cora Jackson (born November 6, 1978) is an American former multi-sport athlete. He played college basketball for Ranger College before transferring to the University of Nevada where he played both basketball and American football. He later played football professionally, including for the Cleveland Browns of the National Football League (NFL). In 2004, he was named the NFL Europe Defensive Player of the Year.

== Early life ==
On November 6, 1978, Andrick Cora Jackson was born in Camden, South Carolina to Andrew and Juanita Jackson. He attended North Central High School in Kershaw, South Carolina where he played basketball and ran track. In 1997, Jackson received an All Area MVP Award in basketball for the 1996–1997 basketball season. He was also named to the all-conference and all-defensive team.

== College career ==
In 1998, at the age of 19, Jackson quit his job at Walmart and bought a one-way Greyhound bus ticket to Ranger, Texas. He attended Ranger College from 1998 to 2000 and received an associate degree. While at Ranger College, Jackson played basketball under head coach Todd Neighbors, where he averaged 16.5 points, 11.0 rebounds, 2.0 assists and 2.0 blocked shots per game during the 1999–2000 season. He then transferred to the University of Nevada at Reno where continued to play basketball but also took up football. During his senior season, he led the Western Athletic Conference in rebounds as well as being one of the leading rebounders in the NCAA Division I.

== Professional career ==
In 2003, Jackson signed with the Cleveland Browns as a rookie free agent and participated on the practice squad. In 2004, Jackson signed a two-year contract with the Browns and was added to the active roster, appearing in one game that season. During the 2004 season, Jackson played for the Frankfurt Galaxy of NFL Europe, where he was named the Defensive Player of the Year. The Browns released Jackson in 2005. Shortly thereafter, he signed a contract with the Denver Broncos where he participated on the Broncos' practice squad. In 2006, he signed a two-year contract with the Broncos. In September 2006, Jackson was released by the Broncos. He also played for the New York Dragons of the Arena Football League in 2007.
