= Lugoff, South Carolina =

- Census-designated place
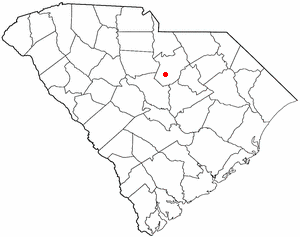
- Interactive map of Lugoff, South Carolina
- Coordinates: 34°12′24″N 80°43′51″W
- Country: United States
- State: South Carolina
- County: Kershaw

Area
  - Total: 23.07 sq mi (59.76 km^{2})
  - Land: 22.78 sq mi (59.00 km^{2})
  - Water: 0.29 sq mi (0.76 km^{2})
- Elevation: 331 ft (101 m)

Population (2020)
  - Total: 9,990
  - Density: 438.6/sq mi (169.34/km^{2})
- Time zone: UTC-5 (Eastern (EST))
  - Summer (DST): UTC-4 (EDT)
- ZIP code: 29078
- Area codes: 803, 839
- FIPS code: 45-43000
- GNIS feature ID: 2403245

Lugoff (/ˈljuːɡɒf/ LEW-gof) is an unincorporated community and census-designated place (CDP) in Kershaw County, South Carolina, United States. The population was 9,990 at the 2020 census, up from 7,434 at the 2010 census. It is part of the Columbia, South Carolina Metropolitan Statistical Area.

== History ==
Lugoff was named for Count Lugoff. The Count was a Russian engineer who worked on construction of the Seaboard Air Line Railway in 1899. The railroad had a station in Lugoff.

== Geography ==
Lugoff is located 5 miles (8 km) southwest of Camden, the Kershaw county seat, and 2.5 miles (4.0 km) west of the Wateree River.

According to the United States Census Bureau, the CDP has a total area of 15.3 square miles (39.6 km^{2}), of which 15.0 square miles (38.9 km^{2}) are land and 0.6 square kilometres (0.2 sq mi), or 1.64%, are water.

== Demographics ==
Historical population
Census	Pop.	Note	%±
2020	9,990		—
U.S. Decennial Census

=== 2020 census ===
Lugoff racial composition
Race	Num.	Perc.
White (non-Hispanic)	6,943	69.5%
Black or African American (non-Hispanic)	2,050	20.52%
Native American	7	0.07%
Asian	89	0.89%
Pacific Islander	8	0.08%
Other/Mixed	454	4.54%
Hispanic or Latino	439	4.39%

As of the 2020 United States census, there were 9,990 people, 3,217 households, and 2,295 families residing in the CDP.

=== 2010 census ===
As of the census of 2010, there were 7,434 people, 2,861 households, and 2,130 families residing in the CDP. The population density was 494.6 inhabitants per square mile (191.0/km^{2}). There were 3,017 housing units, of which 156, or 5.2%, were vacant. The racial makeup of the CDP was 79.9% white, 16.9% African American, 0.2% Native American, 0.5% Asian, 0.1% Pacific Islander, 1.0% some other races, and 1.4% from two or more races. Hispanic or Latino of any race were 2.7% of the population.

Of the 2,861 households in the CDP, 38.9% had children under the age of 18 living with them, 56.0% were headed by married couples living together, 14.0% had a female householder with no husband present, and 25.6% were non-families. 22.7% of all households were made up of individuals, and 7.9% were someone living alone who was 65 years of age or older. The average household size was 2.59, and the average family size was 3.03.

In the CDP, 26.3% of the population were under the age of 18, 6.9% were from 18 to 24, 25.2% were from 25 to 44, 28.3% were from 45 to 64, and 13.3% were 65 years of age or older. The median age was 39.2 years. For every 100 females, there were 92.8 males. For every 100 females age 18 and over, there were 87.6 males.

For the period 2013–17, the estimated median annual income for a household in the CDP was $56,665, and the median income for a family was $64,148. Male full-time workers had a median income of $45,810 versus $36,250 for females. The per capita income for the CDP was $24,386. About 10.5% of families and 15.0% of the population were below the poverty line, including 20.5% of those under age 18 and 11.3% of those age 65 or over.

== Arts and culture ==
The Lights of Lugoff Christmas Parade takes place every Christmas season in Lugoff.

== Education ==
The school district including Lugoff is the Kershaw County School District.

Schools which are in the Lugoff area include:

- Lugoff-Elgin High School
- Lugoff-Elgin Middle School
- Lugoff Elementary School
- Wateree Elementary School
- Doby's Mill Elementary School

== Media ==
The West Wateree Chronicle is the consolidated newspaper that serves Lugoff, as well as nearby Elgin.

== Infrastructure ==
=== Major highways ===
- I-20
- US 1
- US 601
- SC 34
- SC 12

== Notable people ==
- Brook Benton, singer and songwriter
- Matt Campbell, former Offensive Lineman of the Carolina Panthers
- "Hacksaw" Jim Duggan, professional wrestler
- Thomas Payne, United States Army Medal of Honor recipient and Delta Force member
- Donald Leroy Truesdell, United States Marine Corps Medal of Honor recipient during the Occupation of Nicaragua
- Patricia Jackson, Survivor: Marquesas contestant
