= Ike Hampton =

American baseball player (born 1951)

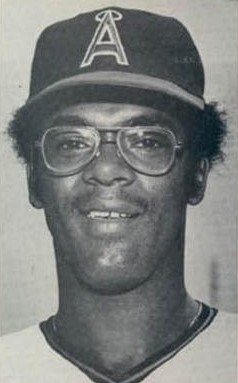
- Catcher
- Born: August 22, 1951 (age 75); Camden, South Carolina, U.S.
- Batted: Switch Threw: Right

MLB debut
- September 12, 1974, for the New York Mets

Last MLB appearance
- July 8, 1979, for the California Angels

MLB statistics
- Batting average: .207
- Home runs: 4
- Runs batted in: 18
- Stats at Baseball Reference

Teams
- New York Mets (1974); California Angels (1975–1979); Kintetsu Buffaloes (1981)

Isaac Bernard Hampton (born August 22, 1951) is a former Major League Baseball catcher. He graduated from Camden High School in Camden, SC and signed by the New York Mets as an amateur free agent on August 22, 1970, and played for the Mets (1974) and the California Angels (1975–1979).

Hampton made his major league debut as a pinch hitter on September 12, 1974, at Shea Stadium. Batting for first baseman John Milner in the bottom of the 9th against Al Hrabosky of the St. Louis Cardinals, he flew out to center field. During spring training of 1975, he was traded to the Angels for relief pitcher Ken Sanders.

Hampton's best year in the big leagues was 1977, when he stayed with the Angels for the entire season. In 52 games he batted .295 (13-for-44) with 3 home runs and 9 runs batted in.

Career totals include 113 games played, a .207 batting average (28-for-135), 4 HR, 18 RBI, 15 runs scored, and a .341 slugging percentage. He had a strong arm and threw out 18 of 48 stolen base attempts. (37.5%)

He was released by California on April 1, 1980. In 1981, he played for the Kintetsu Buffaloes in Japan.
