= Matthew Levy =

Matthew Levy may refer to:

- Matt Levy, Australian Paralympic swimmer
- Matthew Levy (politician), American politician from Mississippi
- Matthew M. Levy, American politician from New York
- Matthew N. Levy, American physiologist
