= Tyronne Drakeford =

American football player (born 1971)

No. 22, 26, 33
- Position: Cornerback

Personal information
- Born: June 21, 1971 (age 55); Camden, South Carolina, U.S.
- Listed height: 5 ft 11 in (1.80 m)
- Listed weight: 185 lb (84 kg)

Career information
- High school: North Central (Kershaw, South Carolina)
- College: Virginia Tech
- NFL draft: 1994: 2nd round, 62nd overall pick

Career history
- San Francisco 49ers (1994–1997); New Orleans Saints (1998–1999); Washington Redskins (2000); San Francisco 49ers (2001)

Awards and highlights
- Super Bowl champion (XXIX)

Career NFL statistics
- Tackles: 274
- Interceptions: 16
- Touchdowns: 1
- Stats at Pro Football Reference

Tyronne James Drakeford (born June 21, 1971) is an American former professional football player who was a cornerback in the National Football League (NFL). He played for the San Francisco 49ers, New Orleans Saints, and Washington Redskins. He played college football for the Virginia Tech Hokies and was selected in the second round of the 1994 NFL draft.
