= Matt Campbell (offensive lineman) =

American football player (born 1972)

No. 87, 66
- Positions: Guard, tackle, tight end

Personal information
- Born: July 14, 1972 (age 54); North Augusta, South Carolina, U.S.
- Listed height: 6 ft 4 in (1.93 m)
- Listed weight: 284 lb (129 kg)

Career information
- High school: North Augusta
- College: South Carolina
- NFL draft: 1994: undrafted
- Expansion draft: 2002: 1st round, 9th overall pick

Career history
- New Orleans Saints (1994)*; Carolina Panthers (1995–2000); Washington Redskins (2001); Houston Texans (2002)*
- * Offseason or practice squad member only

Career NFL statistics
- Games Played: 80
- Games Started: 63
- Receptions: 3
- Receiving yards: 32
- Stats at Pro Football Reference

Matthew Thomas Campbell (born July 14, 1972) is an American former professional football player who was an offensive lineman in the National Football League (NFL) for the Carolina Panthers and the Washington Redskins. He played college football at the University of South Carolina. He is the former offensive coordinator at Virginia Military Institute (VMI). In January 2015, he was named the head football coach and athletic director at Lugoff-Elgin High Schoolin Lugoff, South Carolina.
