= Carolina Cup =

- Location: Camden, South Carolina
- Inaugurated: 1932
- Website: www.carolinacup.org

The Carolina Cup is an annual steeplechase horse race held at the Springdale Race Course in Camden, South Carolina. The race holds the National Steeplechase Association attendance record of 71,000 people. The Carolina Cup has raised thousands of dollars for the local Kershaw County Medical Center.

Each year the gates open at 9:00 AM, cadets from the prestigious Camden Military Academy present the colors at 11:45 AM, and the six races begin at 1:00 PM. Each race runs thirty-five minutes apart. General admission is thirty dollars in advance and forty-five dollars at the gates. Suggested attire is typically dresses and sunhats for women and bowties and sport coats for men. Races run regardless of bad weather.

== History ==
The land which the course now occupies, now named Springdale Race Course, was originally purchased and developed as a race course by Ernest Woodward, a New York local who was both Chairman of the Board and owner of the Jell-O Corporation as well as an avid foxhunter with the Genesee Valley Hunt. In the 1940s, Woodward gave the 600 acres of the course to Ernest Kirkover, who was unable to afford the costs of upkeeping the race course. The property was then sold a few years later to Mrs. Ambrose Clark of Aiken, SC. Subsequent to her death, the race course was bought by Marion duPont Scott. Mrs. Scott participated in the Carolina Cup at the Springdale Race Course in 1932 and won first place. When Mrs. Scott died in 1983, the 600 acres (2.4 km^{2}) plus of Springdale Race Course was deeded to the state of South Carolina under agreement that the land remain solely for equine use in perpetuity. She also bequeathed a million dollar endowment for maintenance. Today the course is managed by Toby Edwards, himself a former steeplechase jockey and trainer. Today both Springdale Race Course and the National Steeplechase Museum share the Board of Directors.

== Buildings and structures ==
The racing offices and the Steeplechase Museum, both non-profit organizations, are located on the grounds of the race course. The original building was moved from Marion duPont Scott's Camden house over to the race course. The building reflects Camden’s famous cottage architecture found in many of the residences visited by the horsemen around the turn of the century.

=== Areas and sections of the race course ===
Sections of the course for viewers are the Infield, East and West Rail, Restricted section, Front Row Paddock, The Meadow, and the Grandstand Box. Viewers pay different prices to park in varying tailgate sections, depending on which it is. Refer to carolinacup.org for actual ticket prices. This includes one parking credential for one Grandstand Box, Six Box Seat badge credentials and six wristbands, which allow all day access to the Jim Hudson Lexus Post and Paddock Clubhouse Luncheon tent.
