= Mordecai M. Levy =

19th-century American politician

Mordecai Marks Levy was a pharmacist, merchant, and newspaper editor who served as sheriff and as a state legislator in South Carolina. He was part of Camden, South Carolina's Jewish community.

He represented Kershaw County in the state legislature from 1834 to 1838 and was a candidate for U.S. Congress in 1836.

As editor of the Camden Commercial Courier, he voiced opposition to abolitionist efforts from the North.

In 1841 he signed on to a letter supporting a General Bankrupt Law in the U.S. Senate.

He had sisters named Flora and Rosina Levy, both of whom (one at a time) married Chapman Levy.
