= North Central High School (Kershaw, South Carolina) =

Public AA High School in Kershaw County, South Carolina

- North Central High School logo
- Type: Public
- Established: 1979
- District: Kershaw County School District
- Grades: 9–12
- Principal: David Branham
- Student–Teacher Ratio: 17
- Teaching Staff: 36 (FTE)
- Students: 598 (2023–2024)
- Campus: Distant Rural
- Colors: Green & Gold
- Mascot: Knight
- Rival: Andrew Jackson Volunteers
- Yearbook: Shield
- Homepage: nch.kcsdschools.net

North Central High School is a public high school located at 3000 Lockhart Road in Kershaw, South Carolina, United States. It is part of the Kershaw County School District and serves students in grades 9 through 12.

Established in 1979, North Central is the result of a merger of Mt. Pisgah, Baron DeKalb, and Midway High Schools. NCHS is one of the largest attendance zones (300 square miles) in the state serving the Cassatt, Mt. Pisgah, Bethune, Westville, Kershaw and Liberty Hill communities.

North Central High School serves approximately 598 students as of the 2023–2024 school year, with a student–teacher ratio of 17. The principal is NCHS Alumni, David Branham.

In 1999, the school board voted to close the Bethune High School. Those students and staff members were consolidated into North Central's population. Since its opening in 1979, North Central High has housed students in grades 7 through 12. In 2002, the school district opened the new North Central Middle School, which moved grades 7 and 8 from the High School and grade 6 from the four elementary schools. In 2008, NCHS saw the completion of the facilities equalization plan which included the addition of a new gym, wellness center, tennis courts, track, field house, athletic training facilities, and 450-seat auditorium.

At 10:33 p.m. on Saturday, January 11, 2020, an EF2 tornado with maximum wind speeds of 130 mph heavily damaged the campus, including the stadium, school, and approximately 28 school buses in the transportation office. After the National Weather Service verified the tornado, they reported:

The tornado began near the intersection of Lockhart Rd and Keys Ln, then traveled northeast across the campus of North Central High School before lifting approximately a half mile later beyond the parking lot on the northeast side of the school. The tornado snapped numerous pine trees at the beginning of the track, then partially collapsed concrete stadium bleachers and a press box. The tornado continued across the gymnasium, lifting all of the hvac units off the roof. The tornado then lifted most of the roof off of the main office and an older auditorium, then collapsed the exterior wall along a portion of the west side of the building. The tornado then moved into the parking lot on the north side of the building where it moved 4 school buses, and resulted in broken windows and other damages to 25-30 parked school buses. The tornado then destroyed a small building just beyond the parking lot before lifting. Strong inflow into the tornado also snapped numerous pine trees south of the baseball field, collapsed 2 large light stands near the baseball field, and lifted and displaced a conex shipping container approximately 50 yards. The tornado path length was about 0.50 miles and the path width was about 150 yards.

The school was relocated to 874 Vocational Lane in Camden, South Carolina while repairs were made to the home campus. This campus served as ATEC prior to it being reopened to serve North Central students on January 15, 2020.

On January 3, 2023, NCHS held a dedication ceremony for the new facility. The following day, on January 4, 2023, the Knight family returned to school at the new facility on Lockhart Road to begin classes after Christmas break came to an end. It is now the newest high school in the Kershaw County School District.

== Academics ==
The school offers a standard high school curriculum including courses in English, mathematics, science, social studies, and electives. Advanced Placement (AP) and honors courses are available for students seeking more rigorous academic challenges.

== Athletics ==
The school's athletic teams are known as the Knights. They compete in football, basketball, baseball, softball, soccer, track and field, and cheerleading. The rivalry with Andrew Jackson High School is particularly notable in football and basketball.

== Extracurricular Activities ==
North Central High School offers various extracurricular activities, including clubs, band, and student government. The school yearbook is titled Shield.

== State Championships ==
    SCHSL

=== Class A ===
• Softball: 1999

=== Class AA ===
• Volleyball: 2024

    SCSCA

=== Class AA ===
• Weightlifting: 2024 - 2025

== State Runner-Up ==
    SCHSL

=== Class A ===
• Volleyball: 1995

• Track & Field (Boys): 2002

=== Class AA ===
• Wrestling: 2019, 2020

• Volleyball: 2021

== Notable alumni ==
- Tyronne Drakeford - Professional football player - San Francisco 49ers, New Orleans Saints, and Washington Redskins
- Cedrick Cunningham Jr. - D1 College Football Player - Army Black Knights
