= Terrorist incidents in Pakistan in 1995 =

- March 8 — Gunmen attacked a 20-passenger bus in Karachi carrying American diplomats working for the United States Consulate. CIA officer Jacqueline Van Landingham, and Gary Durrell were killed. Driver Mark McCloy was injured in the attack.
- November 19 — Egyptian Embassy bombing: At least 16 people were killed and 60 others injured by the bombing of the Egyptian Embassy in Islamabad. Ten people were later arrested in connection with the incident.
- December 21 — 1995 Peshawar bombing: At least 25 people were killed and 100 wounded by a car bomb at 6:30pm in Peshawar's Saddar Street market. The bomb was a timing device, using 55 pounds of explosives. Wadood & Sons department store & 8 cars were also set ablaze by the explosion. Provincial governor Khurshid Ali Khan's daughter and two grandchildren were among those killed in the incident. Officials suspected Afghan President Burhanuddin Rabbani's supporters were behind the carnage.
- December 22 — 2 people were killed and several wounded after a bomb went off in a bus near Salarwala, Faisalabad district.
