= WPUB-FM =

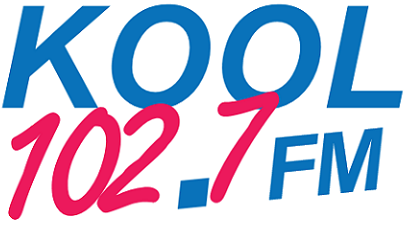
- Camden, South Carolina; United States
- Broadcast area: Kershaw County, South Carolina
- Frequency: 102.7 MHz
- Branding: Kool 102.7

Programming
- Format: Oldies
- Affiliations: Fox News Radio

Ownership
- Owner: Kershaw Radio Corporation
- Sister stations: WCAM

History
- First air date: December 16, 1975

Technical information
- Licensing authority: FCC
- Facility ID: 34295
- Class: A
- ERP: 6,000 watts
- HAAT: 91 meters
- Transmitter coordinates: 34°13′31.00″N 80°40′44.00″W

Links
- Public license information: Public file; LMS
- Webcast: Listen Live
- Website: kool1027.com

WPUB-FM (102.7 MHz) is a radio station broadcasting an oldies format. Licensed to Camden, South Carolina, United States. Previous frequency was 94.3 MHz until 1998. The station is currently owned by Kershaw Radio Corporation. The station also broadcasts Camden, Lugoff-Elgin, and North Central High School Sports. The station is an affiliate of the South Carolina Gamecock Radio Network, Clemson Tigers Sports Network, as well as Atlanta Braves, Carolina Panthers, and MRN Radio. WPUB is also home of The Locker Room Sports Show, covering everything in Kershaw County Sports.
