= Matthew Levy (politician) =

American politician (1848-1933)

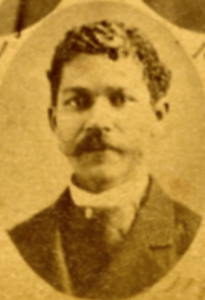
Levy in 1882

Matthew Levy (May 1848 – July 24, 1933) was a teacher and state legislator in Mississippi. He represented Madison County, Mississippi in the Mississippi House of Representatives in 1882 and 1883.

He studied at Alcorn University. He opposed discriminatory voter registration laws. He lived in Jackson, Mississippi and was a pallbearer for lawyer John F. Harris of Greenville, Mississippi. He married Cornelia Jones. He eventually moved to Liberty, Arkansas, and is buried at the Peters Cemetery in Lee County, Arkansas.

He may have been a son of Chapman Levy.
