= Elgin, Kershaw and Richland counties, South Carolina =

Elgin
- Town
- Seal
- Nickname: Home of the Catfish Stomp
- Motto: "Small Town with a Big Heart"
- Location within South Carolina Location within the United States
- Coordinates: 34°10′13″N 80°47′35″W
- Country: United States
- State: South Carolina
- County: Kershaw

Area
  - Total: 1.08 sq mi (2.80 km^{2})
  - Land: 1.08 sq mi (2.80 km^{2})
  - Water: 0 sq mi (0.00 km^{2})
- Elevation: 413 ft (126 m)

Population (2020)
  - Total: 1,634
  - Density: 1,509.6/sq mi (582.86/km^{2})
- Time zone: UTC-5 (Eastern (EST))
  - Summer (DST): UTC-4 (EDT)
- ZIP code: 29045
- FIPS code: 45-23245
- GNIS feature ID: 2406432
- Website: townofelginsc.com

Elgin is an incorporated town in Kershaw County, South Carolina, United States. Some portions of the town are in adjacent Richland County, South Carolina. It is located approximately 20 miles (32 km) northeast of the center of Columbia, the state's capital, and is the center of one of the ten townships that make up Kershaw County. As of the 2010 census, the town's population was 1,311, and in 2018 the estimated population was 1,579. It is part of the Columbia, South Carolina Metropolitan Statistical Area.

== Geography ==
Elgin is located in southwestern Kershaw County along U.S. Route 1, which leads southwest to Columbia and northeast 12 miles (19 km) to Camden, the county seat. According to the United States Census Bureau, the town has a total area of 1.06 square miles (2.74 km^{2}), all land.

Elgin lies within the Carolina Sandhills region of the Atlantic Coastal Plain province. This region is characterized by many dunes of wind-blown sand that were active during the last ice age (when conditions were colder, drier, and windier) but the dunes are currently stabilized by vegetation under modern climate conditions.

In late 2021 and 2022, southeastern Kershaw County experienced over 40 earthquakes, 11 of which exceeded a 2.5 magnitude. 6 of the quakes exceeded a 3.0 magnitude, the largest of which registering at a 3.6.

=== Climate ===
According to the Köppen Climate Classification system, Elgin has a humid subtropical climate, abbreviated "Cfa" on climate maps. The hottest temperature recorded in Elgin was 109 °F (42.8 °C) on June 30, 2012, while the coldest temperature recorded was −2 °F (−18.9 °C) on January 21, 1985.

Climate data for Elgin, South Carolina, 1991–2020 normals, extremes 1957–2022
Month	Jan	Feb	Mar	Apr	May	Jun	Jul	Aug	Sep	Oct	Nov	Dec	Year
Record high °F (°C)	80 (27)	84 (29)	89 (32)	94 (34)	98 (37)	109 (43)	106 (41)	106 (41)	99 (37)	95 (35)	88 (31)	80 (27)	109 (43)
Mean maximum °F (°C)	73.2 (22.9)	76.0 (24.4)	82.9 (28.3)	88.1 (31.2)	92.7 (33.7)	98.0 (36.7)	99.4 (37.4)	98.4 (36.9)	94.4 (34.7)	87.0 (30.6)	80.2 (26.8)	74.5 (23.6)	101.0 (38.3)
Mean daily maximum °F (°C)	56.3 (13.5)	60.0 (15.6)	67.2 (19.6)	76.0 (24.4)	83.2 (28.4)	88.9 (31.6)	92.5 (33.6)	90.5 (32.5)	85.4 (29.7)	76.2 (24.6)	66.1 (18.9)	58.9 (14.9)	75.1 (23.9)
Daily mean °F (°C)	44.8 (7.1)	48.0 (8.9)	54.7 (12.6)	63.3 (17.4)	71.3 (21.8)	78.1 (25.6)	81.6 (27.6)	80.0 (26.7)	74.5 (23.6)	64.4 (18.0)	54.2 (12.3)	47.7 (8.7)	63.6 (17.5)
Mean daily minimum °F (°C)	33.3 (0.7)	36.1 (2.3)	42.2 (5.7)	50.6 (10.3)	59.4 (15.2)	67.4 (19.7)	70.7 (21.5)	69.5 (20.8)	63.6 (17.6)	52.5 (11.4)	42.3 (5.7)	36.5 (2.5)	52.0 (11.1)
Mean minimum °F (°C)	18.1 (−7.7)	21.9 (−5.6)	26.4 (−3.1)	35.8 (2.1)	46.9 (8.3)	58.1 (14.5)	63.9 (17.7)	62.5 (16.9)	52.5 (11.4)	37.7 (3.2)	28.5 (−1.9)	23.5 (−4.7)	16.4 (−8.7)
Record low °F (°C)	−2 (−19)	9 (−13)	6 (−14)	24 (−4)	37 (3)	47 (8)	57 (14)	52 (11)	40 (4)	23 (−5)	15 (−9)	4 (−16)	−2 (−19)
Average precipitation inches (mm)	3.70 (94)	3.62 (92)	3.76 (96)	3.21 (82)	3.19 (81)	4.43 (113)	4.67 (119)	4.74 (120)	4.64 (118)	3.24 (82)	3.03 (77)	4.11 (104)	46.34 (1,178)
Average snowfall inches (cm)	0.4 (1.0)	0.0 (0.0)	0.0 (0.0)	0.0 (0.0)	0.0 (0.0)	0.0 (0.0)	0.0 (0.0)	0.0 (0.0)	0.0 (0.0)	0.0 (0.0)	0.0 (0.0)	0.0 (0.0)	0.4 (1)
Average precipitation days (≥ 0.01 in)	8.5	7.9	8.1	7.2	7.0	9.1	9.3	9.3	7.5	6.2	6.0	8.2	94.3
Average snowy days (≥ 0.1 in)	0.0	0.0	0.0	0.0	0.0	0.0	0.0	0.0	0.0	0.0	0.0	0.0	0.0
Source 1: NOAA
Source 2: National Weather Service

== White Pond ==
White Pond is a local landmark in Elgin, consisting of a Sandhills dune formation and 66 acre natural lake. It was formed by the blocking of downstream drainage and wind blown sand during or prior to the Last Glacial Maximum. It is located on the western edge of the Atlantic Plain, and is host to flora typical of inland sand dunes such as the longleaf pine, British Soldier's Lichen and the toxic flowering twine Gelsemium sempervirens.

White Pond has recently attracted scientific and media attention as having preserved a relatively long record of sediment accumulation in the pond. Several scientists have taken various core samples from White Pond that has revealed information on temperatures of non-glaciated areas during the Ice Age and information on plant and animal life in the area during the past. One dune on the south side of White Pond has yielded a luminescence date of ~92,300 years before present (BP). Platinum anomalies have recently been reported at the site at an age that would provide potential evidence for the controversial Younger Dryas impact hypothesis. However, the claim that these anomalies correspond to the Younger Dryas onset has been comprehensively refuted by other researchers

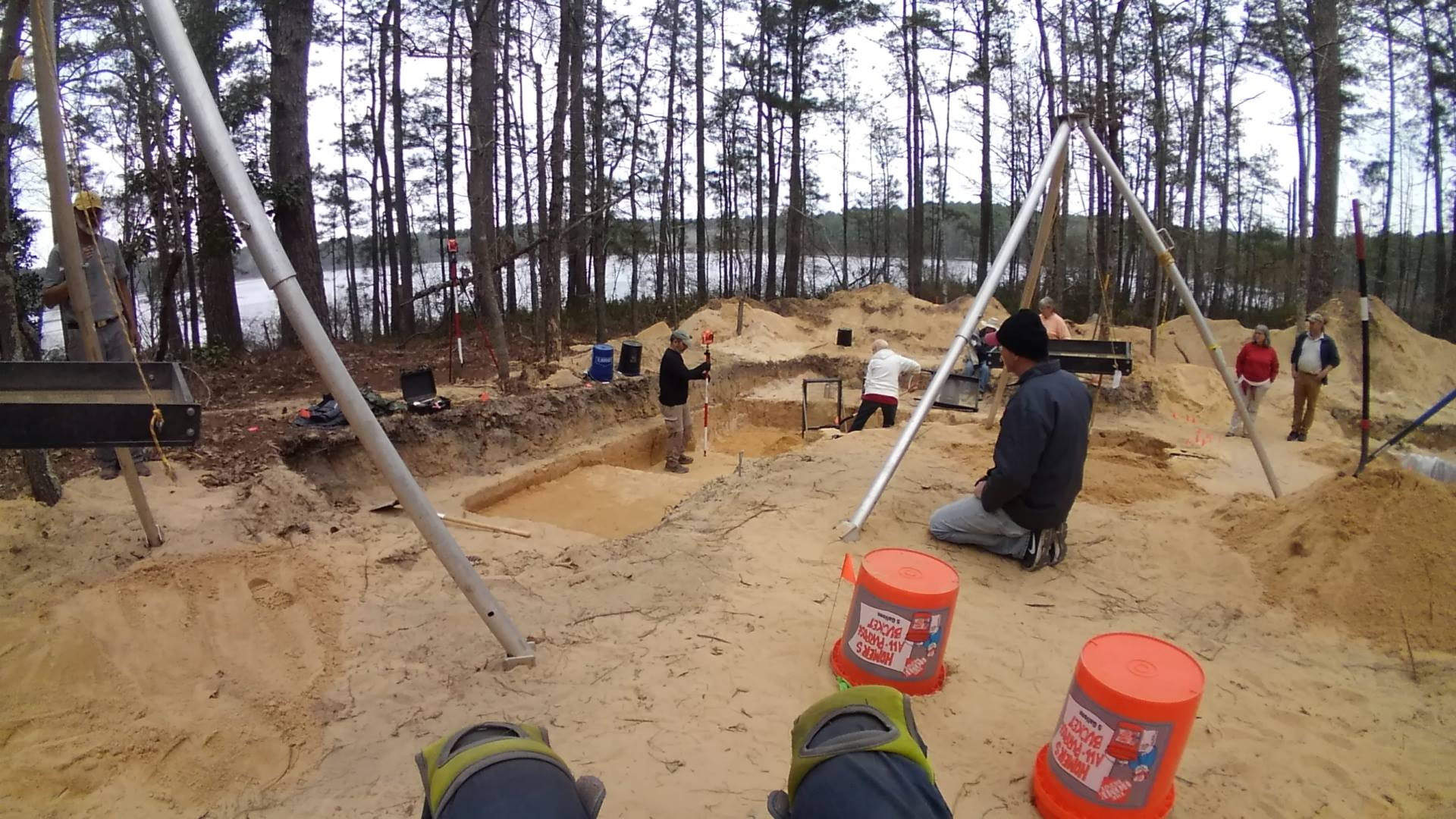
Local volunteers investigate Early Archaic and Paleoindian settlements at White Pond in 2019

White Pond is a noted landmark on architect Robert Mills' map of Kershaw County in 1825. There is a log cabin on the site, which hosts a local private fishing & game club, and the lake is regularly stocked with trout. Archaeological investigation has occurred every year at the site since 2015, led Dr. Christopher Moore, in partnership with the USC Educational Foundation, Archaeological Consultants of the Carolinas Inc, South Carolina Department of Natural Resources, and several local volunteers. In 2017, excavations at White Pond revealed the presence of several layers of archaeological interest, including a Late Paleoindian Dalton occupation. People from the Clovis culture are thought to have resided in the area starting at least 12,500 years ago. Excavations in 2019 yielded an Edgefield scraper and Kirk Notched point, artifacts dating to the early Archaic period.

== Demographics ==
Historical population
Census	Pop.	Note	%±
1910	116		—
1920	156		34.5%
1930	175		12.2%
1940	146		−16.6%
1950	183		25.3%
1960	329		79.8%
1970	374		13.7%
1980	595		59.1%
1990	622		4.5%
2000	806		29.6%
2010	1,311		62.7%
2020	1,634		24.6%
U.S. Decennial Census

=== Racial and ethnic composition ===
Elgin town, South Carolina – Racial and ethnic composition Note: the US Census treats Hispanic/Latino as an ethnic category. This table excludes Latinos from the racial categories and assigns them to a separate category. Hispanics/Latinos may be of any race.
Race / Ethnicity (NH = Non-Hispanic)	Pop 2000	Pop 2010	Pop 2020	% 2000	% 2010	% 2020
White alone (NH)	703	1,065	1,187	87.22%	81.24%	72.64%
Black or African American alone (NH)	67	139	254	8.31%	10.60%	15.54%
Native American or Alaska Native alone (NH)	2	2	0	0.25%	0.15%	0.00%
Asian alone (NH)	1	3	10	0.12%	0.23%	0.61%
Native Hawaiian or Pacific Islander alone (NH)	0	0	2	0.00%	0.00%	0.12%
Other race alone (NH)	1	3	7	0.12%	0.23%	0.43%
Mixed race or Multiracial (NH)	1	22	81	0.12%	1.68%	4.96%
Hispanic or Latino (any race)	31	77	93	3.85%	5.87%	5.69%
Total	806	1,311	1,634	100.00%	100.00%	100.00%

=== 2020 census ===
As of the 2020 United States census, there were 1,634 people, 597 households, and 488 families residing in the town.

=== 2010 census ===
The United States Census Bureau stated in the 2010 census that the town of Elgin held 1,311 individuals, 521 housing units (of which only 484 were occupied), and 375 families of the 1,311 people 1,095 (83.5%) were white, 146 (11.1%) black, 6 (.5%) American Indian, 3 (.2%) Asian, 32 (2.4%) some other race, and 29 (2.2%) of mixed race. About 5% are of Hispanic or Latino descent.

Of the 484 households, over 375 of them held families and of those families 185, or 38.2% of the total households with children under the age of 18. 61.2% of households were of married couples, 4.5% were only male householders, 11.8% were only female householders, and 22.5% of households were nonfamily residences. The average household size was 2.71 and the average family size was 3.05 people.

Elgin's population age is fairly evenly spread, leaning only slightly toward the younger generations. 29.9% of people are under the age of 20, 26.1% are between the age of 20 and 40, 28.3% are between the age of 40 and 60, 15.7% are over the age of 60. The median for the town is 36.8 years of age.

As of the 2010 census, most of the population, 89.1%, of Elgin is a high school graduate or higher. The median income for a single household was $58,500, with the median family income being $66,350. The median earnings for male workers was $50,341, while median earnings for female workers was only $34,471. 7.8% of families and 9.7% of all people were listed as below the poverty level.

== History ==
Elgin, previously named "Blaney", and originally "Jeffers", traces its European-American history to a post office established in the area in 1898. The small community that the post office served adopted the name Jeffers after its first postmaster, William T. Jeffers. The community did not see much growth until the Seaboard Air Line Railroad began expansion in the area in 1900. Development occurred near the railroad depot and post office. Seaboard agents, in an effort to increase use of the rail line, promoted business all along its route, including Jeffers. The town, and post office, was eventually renamed Blaney in honor of a New York banker who helped fund the railroad expansion in the region. The town of Blaney was officially chartered and incorporated on January 23, 1907.

Blaney's first postmaster, Jesse T. Ross (who served for forty-seven years), was the first man to open a business, together with D. D. Evans. A brick schoolhouse was erected in 1912. Very little growth was seen in the town during the next 15 years; the Camden Chronicle said in 1927: "I don't think there were fifty people in [Blaney], in fact you wouldn't know it was a town." However, by 1930, Blaney had built its own high school. In 1931 U.S. Highway 1 was completed. A fully paved road extending along the length of the eastern seaboard, it ran parallel to the already established rail line as it cut through Blaney. This offered a new route to bring in tourism and business to the area. It is still the main route into the town today.

In the late 1950s, postwar industrial development took place throughout the West Wateree Area along U.S. Highway 1. In 1958 a deal was closed with the Whitehead Brothers Sand Company, which opened up a $300,000 sand foundry between Lugoff and Blaney. State Senator John West recruited the Elgin National Watch Company in 1962 to relocate to the area. The company was attracted to the unused land and potential labor market to be recruited from nearby Columbia. Residents voted to change the town's name from Blaney to Elgin in a landslide 61–16 vote. In September 1962, plans were confirmed to build a $1 million assembly plant in the town. The plant offered 240 jobs and received over a thousand applications when the hiring process started.

Due to the new plant, the town upgraded the area's water supply system. By 1963, Elgin was drilling wells as part of a new $150,000 water system, and the plant had begun production. In 1967, officials from the Elgin National Watch Company announced that the plant would be sold to B. F. Goodrich, a manufacturer of tennis shoes, due to the company's inability to compete with foreign-made products. That year, the Hardwicke Chemical Company broke ground at a 15-acre site near Elgin.

Elgin's growth has continued in recent years. In 2005, a new sewer system was completed for the town and a new municipal complex was finished to house the town hall, police department, and fire station. The town grew by over 50% between the 2000 and 2010 census, going from 806 to 1311 residents with continued growth expected in the future. Elgin's current mayor is Melissa Emmons.

== Transportation ==
Since 1931, US Route 1 has been the town's Main Street, running parallel to Interstate 20. Exit 87, 3 miles (5 km) southeast of the town center, provides access from I-20.

=== Major highways ===
- Interstate 20
- US Route 1
- SC Highway 12

== Education ==
- Lugoff-Elgin High School
- Lugoff-Elgin Middle School
- Leslie M. Stover Middle School
- Blaney Elementary School
- Doby's Mill Elementary School

Elgin has a public library, a branch of the Kershaw County Library.

== Arts and culture ==
Elgin is home to the Catfish Stomp, an annual Christmas parade that takes place every year down Main Street.
