= WCAM =

- Camden, South Carolina; United States
- Frequency: 1590 kHz
- Branding: Carolina Country Classics

Programming
- Format: Classic country
- Affiliations: Fox News Radio

Ownership
- Owner: Kershaw Radio Corp.
- Sister stations: WPUB-FM

History
- First air date: July 24, 1948
- Former call signs: WACA (1948–1980)
- Call sign meaning: W CAMden (community of license)

Technical information
- Licensing authority: FCC
- Facility ID: 34294
- Class: D
- Power: 1,000 watts day 27 watts night
- Transmitter coordinates: 34°13′26.00″N 80°40′43.00″W
- Translator: 98.7 W254DQ (Camden)

Links
- Public license information: Public file; LMS
- Webcast: Listen Live
- Website: WCAM Online

WCAM (1590 AM) is a radio station licensed to Camden, South Carolina, United States, broadcasting a classic country format. The station is currently owned by Kershaw Radio Corp. and features programming from Fox News Radio.

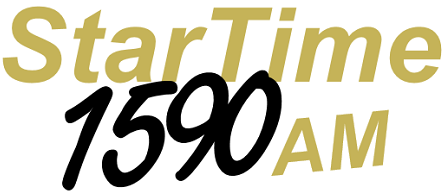
Previous logo
