= Lugoff-Elgin High School =

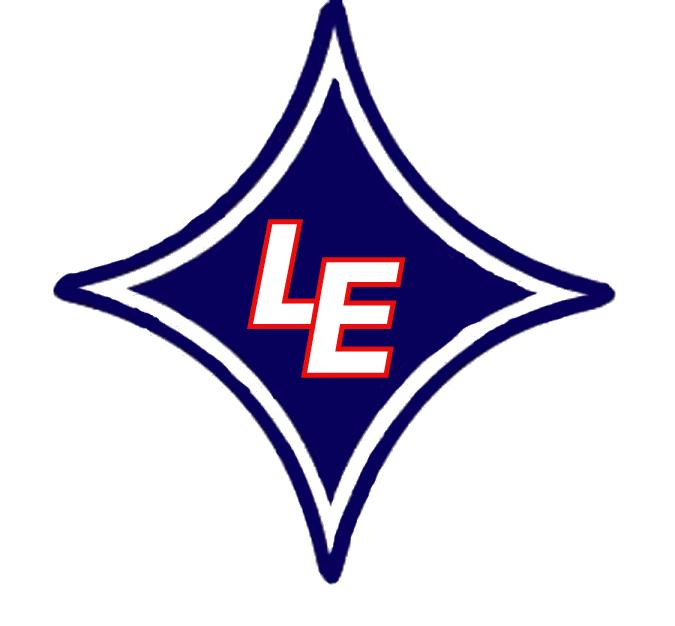

Location
- 1284 Highway 1 South; Lugoff, SC 29078; United States

Information
- Type: Public high school
- Motto: Legacy of Excellence
- School district: Kershaw County School District
- Principal: Corey Wright
- Faculty: 94.00 FTEs
- Grades: 9-12
- Enrollment: 1,773 (2023-2024)
- Student to teacher ratio: 18.86
- Campus: Suburban
- Colors: Red and Blue
- Mascot: Demon
- Website: lhs.kcsdschools.net

Lugoff-Elgin High School (LEHS) is a public high school located in Lugoff, South Carolina, serving the community of Lugoff as well as the town of Elgin. It is one of the three high schools in the Kershaw County School District of South Carolina. It opened in 1971. It is home of the Lugoff-Elgin Demons.

As of the 2014–15 school year, the school had an enrollment of 1,629 students and 83.5 classroom teachers (on an FTE basis), for a student–teacher ratio of 19.5:1. There were 514 students (31.6% of enrollment) eligible for free lunch and 80 (4.9% of students) eligible for reduced-cost lunch.

== Athletics ==
Football, baseball, wrestling, basketball, cheerleading, soccer, tennis, volleyball, archery, track and other sports are offered at LEHS.

South Carolina State Championship Titles:

Baseball: 1992, 1993, 2010

Wrestling: 1997, 1998, 1999, 2001, 2003, 2010

Marching Band: 1981

Softball: 2021

Archery: 2025

=== National Champion Award ===
Wrestling: Ben Connell – 2000

Big Head Champion James Leroy Dent - 1996

== Rivalry ==
Camden and Lugoff-Elgin are rivals in every sport. This is referred around the Camden and Lugoff-Elgin area as the "Wateree River Rivalry". The first football game against them was in 1978. Camden won the game with the score 19–6. They have been playing every year since 1982 (except 2020). The longest losing streak against Camden was from 1982 to 1995. Lugoff-Elgin's first win over Camden was in 1996 with the score 35–17. Camden won the last meeting in 2025 with the score 35–14. The 2020 game was canceled due to the COVID-19 pandemic. Camden leads the rivalry 37–8.

== Alumni ==
- Thomas Payne, Class of 2002, U.S. Army soldier and Medal of Honor recipient

== External links/References ==
- Lugoff-Elgin High School Homepage
- Kershaw County School District Homepage
- Kershaw County Website

== See also ==
- Kershaw County, South Carolina
