= Jacqueline Van Landingham =

African-American CIA employee

Jacqueline Elaine Keys Van Landingham
- Born: Jacqueline Elaine Keys; 1962; Camden, South Carolina
- Died: March 8, 1995, aged 33; Karachi, Pakistan
- Cause of death: Murder by gunshot
- Burial place: Cedars Cemetery, Camden, Kershaw County
- Education: Virginia State University
- Occupation: Intelligence officer
- Years active: 1985-1995
- Employer: Central Intelligence Agency
- Known for: One of the first black female intelligence officers to be killed on duty
- Spouse: Lloyd Van Landingham
- Children: 2

Jacqueline Elaine Keys Van Landingham (ca 1962 – March 8, 1995) was an African-American intelligence officer employed by the Central Intelligence Agency. In 1995 she was killed in Karachi, Pakistan by gunmen while en route to the local consulate. She became one of the first black women to be killed in action while serving in the United States intelligence services.

== Biography ==
=== Early life and education ===
Landingham was from Camden, South Carolina. In 1979, she graduated from Camden High School. In 1984, she graduated with a Bachelor of Science degree from Virginia State University, where she majored in food marketing and management.

=== Intelligence career ===
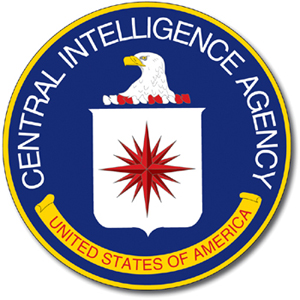

Landingham joined the Central Intelligence Agency after graduation in July 1985. She was employed as a clerk-typist, in the Logistics Branch of the Directorate of Operations, Near East Division. She quickly rose though the ranks at the CIA, and was selected for an overseas assignment a year after joining the service.

In 1986, she was posted to the Middle East as an operations support assistant. By the summer of 1987, she had been promoted and was preparing for a new assignment. During her first assignment, she met her husband, Lloyd Van Landingham, a United States military officer. After her overseas posting, Landingham returned to the United States where she had her first child.

In 1991, Landingham returned to the Middle East for another overseas assignment, where she was tasked with administrative and operational support. In 1992, she returned to the United States to give birth to her second child. A few weeks later, Landingham and her two daughters returned to her overseas assignment in the Middle East.

=== Final posting ===
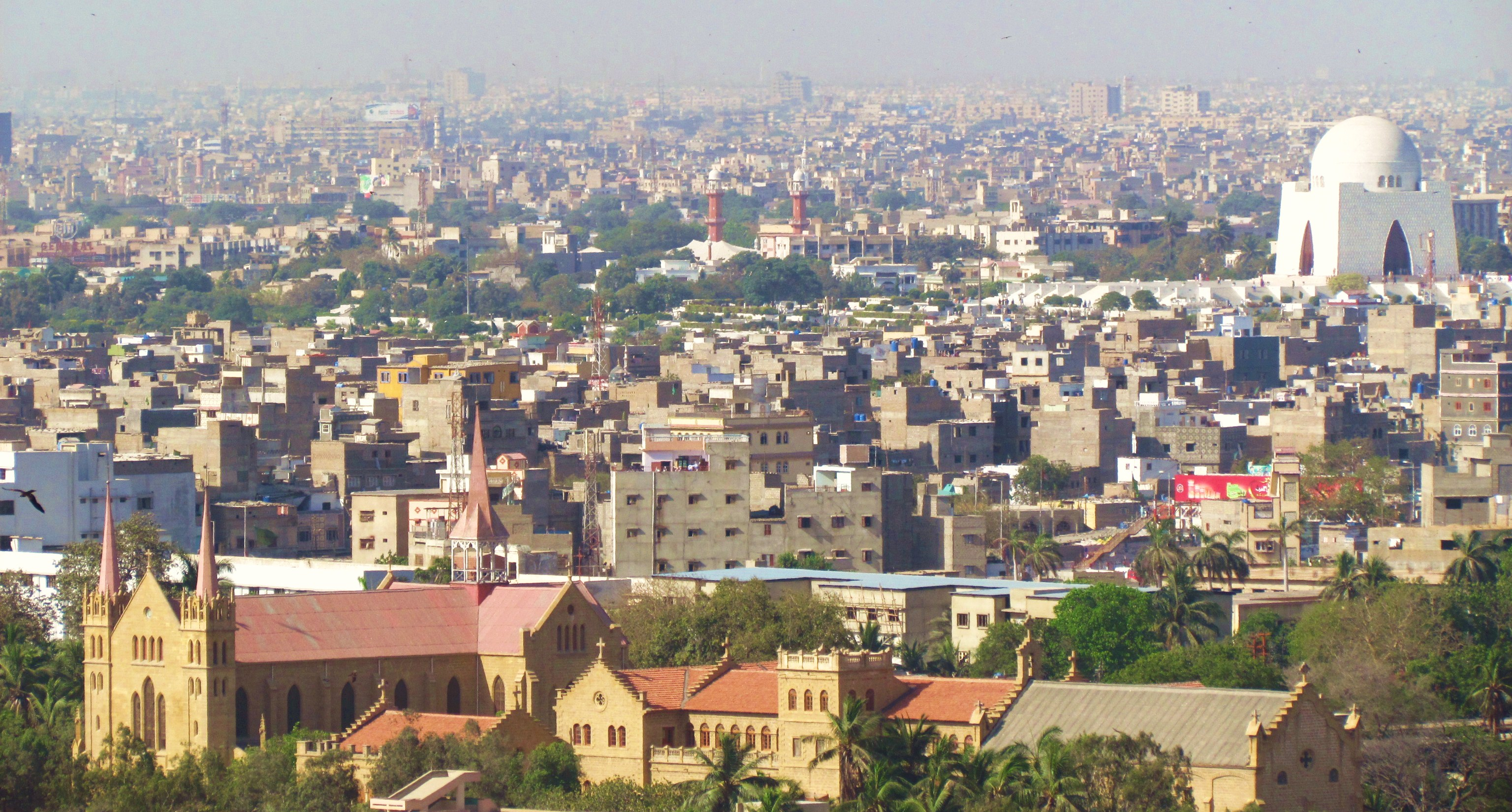
Karachi, Pakistan cityscape

In the summer of 1994, Landingham was posted on her fourth overseas assignment to Karachi, Pakistan. Her two daughters accompanied her, while her husband was posted abroad elsewhere.

In the early 1990s United States intelligence operations were heavily focused on Pakistan. At the time, the United States was seeking to locate Mir Aimal Kansi, the Pakistani perpetrator of the 1993 CIA headquarters shooting, and keep an eye on Operation Clean-up and the newly formed Al-Qaeda terrorist organization (which was in the planning stages of the Bojinka plot, scheduled for early 1995). Due to the nature of Landingham's work with the intelligence services, it is unclear what her specific duties in Karachi entailed.

On March 8, 1995, Landingham was one of three passengers riding in a 20-passenger shuttle bus attached to the United States consulate in Karachi when it was attacked by two terrorists with AK-47 rifles. Landingham was seriously injured in the attack and later died at Aga Khan University Hospital, Karachi. She was 33 years old. Landingham was killed alongside Karachi consulate employee Gary C. Durell, who was recognized at the time as a "communications technician" from Alliance, Ohio. Later reports speculated that Durell was also an intelligence officer working with the National Security Agency and that he was the primary target of the attack.

=== Aftermath ===
It was speculated at the time that the deaths were in retaliation of the U.S. capture of Ramzi Yousef a month prior. No terrorist groups claimed responsibility for the attack.

On March 12, 1995, the flag-draped coffins containing Landingham and Durell's bodies arrived at Andrews Air Force Base and was received by an honor guard. The United States government issued a $2 million reward asking for information leading to an arrest of those responsible for the attack, and fifty Federal Bureau of Investigation agents were reportedly posted to Karachi to investigate.

Due to the nature of Landingham's work, her CIA affiliation was not disclosed at the time of her death. She was described in the press at the time as a secretary working at the United States State Department. It would be more than fifteen years before her CIA affiliation was made public.

In 1998, Saulat Mirza was arrested in suspicion of Landingham and Durell's deaths, but denied involvement. As of 2025, no one had been publicly convicted of the assassinations.

=== Legacy ===
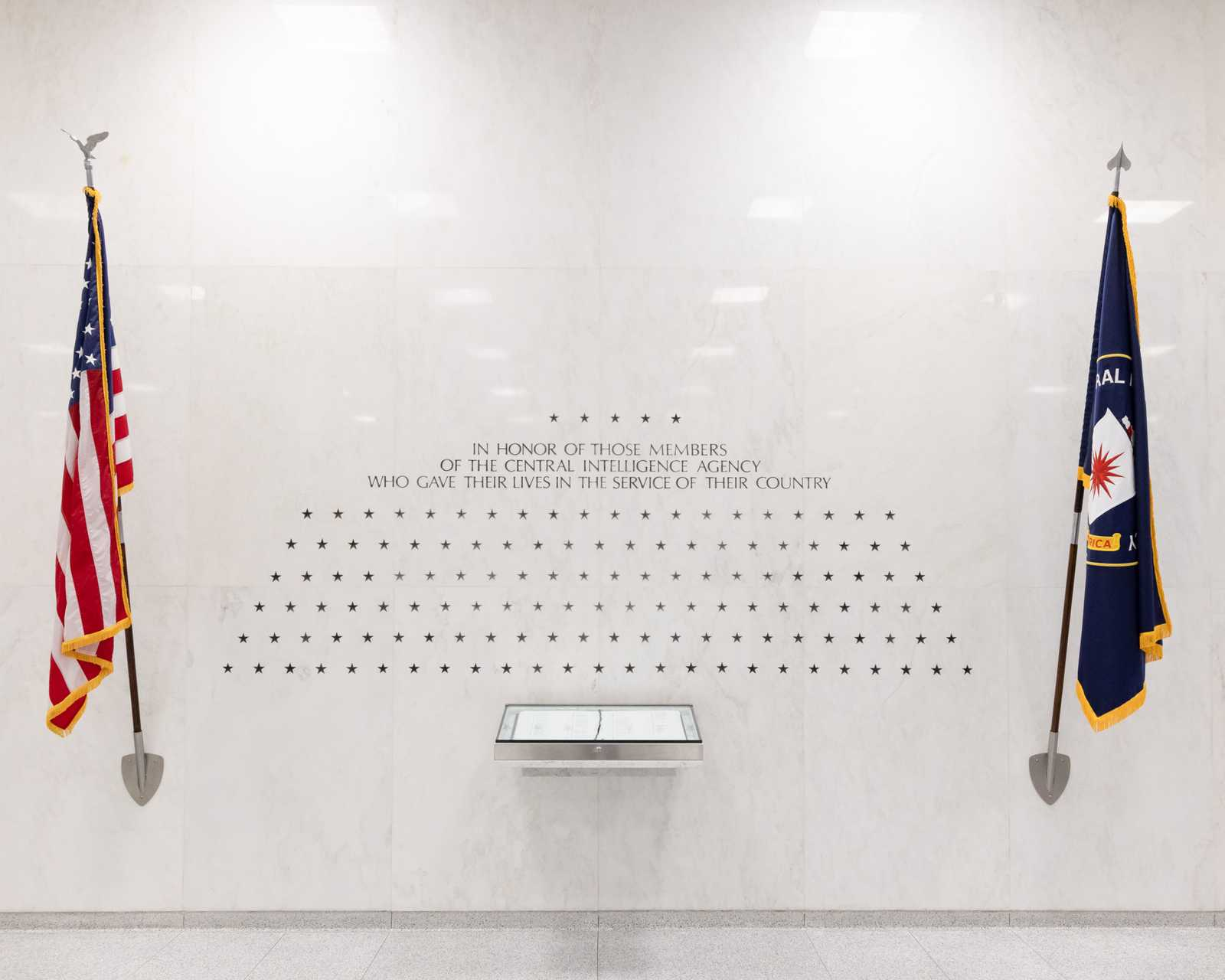
The CIA Memorial Wall, where Van Landingham is recognized with a star

After her death, Landingham was memorialized at CIA headquarters with a star on the Agency's Memorial Wall. On May 22, 2012, her name was publicly disclosed in the Agency's Book of Honor, where she was recognized as an accomplished officer known for her liveliness and humor.

Landingham and Durell are commemorated alongside other fallen State Department employees at the memorial garden on the grounds of the State Department compound in Pakistan. On February 26, 2014, then CIA Director John Brennan specifically recognized Landingham's sacrifice when commemorating fallen officers during the CIA's Black History Month Celebration.

== See also ==
- Terrorist incidents in Pakistan in 1995
- Terrorist incidents on buses in Pakistan
- CIA activities in Pakistan
