= John C. West =

American politician (1922–2004)

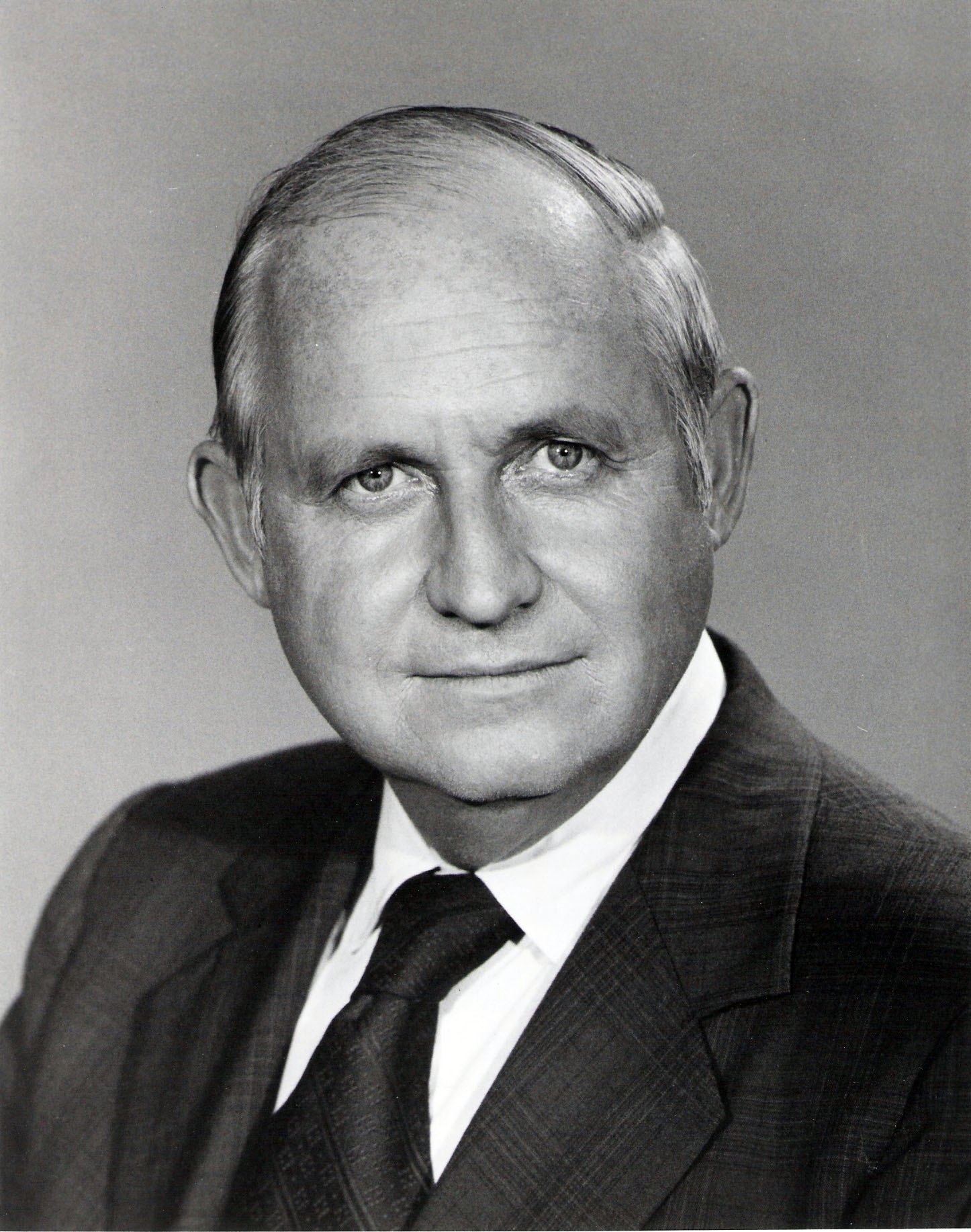

United States Ambassador to Saudi Arabia
- In office June 8, 1977 – March 21, 1981
- President: Jimmy Carter; Ronald Reagan
- Preceded by: William J. Porter
- Succeeded by: Robert G. Neumann

109th Governor of South Carolina
- In office January 19, 1971 – January 21, 1975
- Lieutenant: Earle Morris Jr.
- Preceded by: Robert Evander McNair
- Succeeded by: James B. Edwards

80th Lieutenant Governor of South Carolina
- In office January 17, 1967 – January 19, 1971
- Governor: Robert Evander McNair
- Preceded by: Robert Evander McNair
- Succeeded by: Earle Morris Jr.

Member of the South Carolina Senate from Kershaw County
- In office January 11, 1955 – January 10, 1967
- Preceded by: James Clator Arrants
- Succeeded by: District abolished

Personal details
- Born: John Carl West; August 27, 1922 Camden, South Carolina, U.S.
- Died: March 21, 2004 (aged 81) Hilton Head Island, South Carolina, U.S.
- Party: Democratic
- Spouse: Lois Rhame (m. 1942)
- Children: 3
- Education: The Citadel; University of South Carolina

Military service
- Branch/service: United States Army

John Carl West Sr. (August 27, 1922 – March 21, 2004) was a U.S. Democratic Party politician who served as the 109th governor of South Carolina from 1971 to 1975. He served as United States Ambassador to Saudi Arabia from 1977 to 1981.

== Early life ==
West was born in Camden, South Carolina and grew up in the farming community of Charlotte Thompson near Camden. The following May, his father, along with seventy-six other persons, was killed in a fire at the nearby Cleveland School. His mother and maternal grandmother escaped unharmed from the fire.

In 1942, he West graduated from The Citadel with a bachelor's degree in political science. After graduation, he enlisted in the United States Army as an intelligence officer during World War II, assigned to stateside service.

== Political career ==
Following the war, West earned a law degree from the University of South Carolina School of Law in 1946. From 1948 to 1952, he served on the state Highway Commission. In 1954, he coordinated the unsuccessful U.S. Senate candidacy of Edgar A. Brown, who lost in a write-in campaign waged by former Governor Strom Thurmond.

From 1955 to 1967, West served in the state senate. He was assigned to several committees which studied public school curriculum, investigated activities of the Communist Party of the United States of America, monitored the state Development Board, examined state support for the nursing profession and junior colleges, and recommended revisions to the state constitution.

West was the 80th lieutenant governor of South Carolina, having served from 1967 to 1971. In the 1970 gubernatorial election, West defeated U.S. Representative Albert W. Watson, a Democrat-turned-Republican with 53.2 percent of the vote. Regarded as a New South governor, West vowed in his 1971 inaugural address that he would "eliminate from our government any vestige of discrimination because of race, creed, sex, religion or any other barrier to fairness for all citizens."

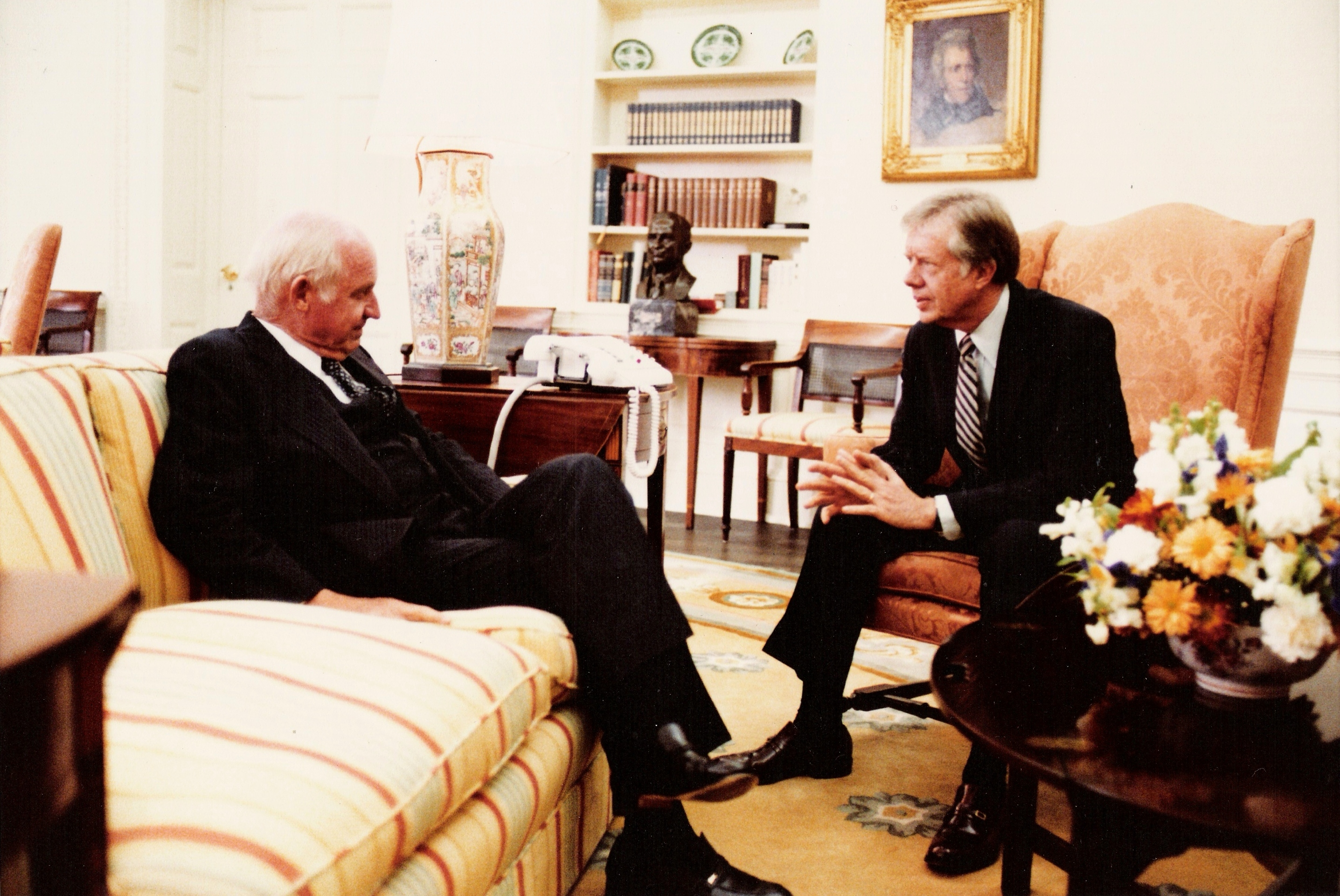

After his tenure as governor, West returned to private law practice and was subsequently appointed by President Jimmy Carter to serve as United States Ambassador to Saudi Arabia, a position that he held from 1977 to 1981. After returning to the United States, he became a professor of Middle Eastern Studies at the University of South Carolina. From 1993 until his death from cancer, he was a partner in the Hilton Head law office of Bethea, Jordan, and Griffin.

== Personal life ==
West married Lois Rhame in 1942. They had three children. West died of liver cancer at his home on Hilton Head Island on March 21, 2004.

Party political offices
Preceded by Robert Evander McNair	Democratic nominee for Lieutenant Governor of South Carolina; 1966	Succeeded by Earle Morris Jr.
Preceded by Robert Evander McNair	Democratic nominee for Governor of South Carolina; 1970	Succeeded by Charles D. Ravenel
Political offices
Preceded by Robert Evander McNair	Governor of South Carolina; January 19, 1971–January 21, 1975	Succeeded by James B. Edwards
Preceded by Robert Evander McNair	Lieutenant Governor of South Carolina; January 17, 1967– January 19, 1971	Succeeded by Earle Morris Jr.
Diplomatic posts
Preceded by William J. Porter	United States Ambassador to Saudi Arabia; 1977–1981	Succeeded by Robert G. Neumann
