= Lorenzo James =

American politician

Lorenzo James (April 19, 1805 – September 19, 1888) was an American politician.

James was born in Camden, South Carolina, April 19, 1805. His grandfather, John James, was a captain in General Marion's command in the American Revolution. His father, Samuel James, who had been a member of the South Carolina legislature, migrated to the neighborhood of Jackson, in Clarke County, south-western Alabama, in 1818, but soon died. This left James and his siblings in the care of their mother. James entered Yale College in 1822 from a private school in Jamaica, Long Island, New York and graduated in 1825. Returning to Alabama, he married in 1827 Eliza, daughter of Gen. John Scott, of Montgomery, and settled on a plantation in the western part of Montgomery County. This area afterwards became part of the new county of Lowndes. James was a successful planter, brought up a large family of children, and owned 103 slaves.

He represented the county in the Alabama State Senate in 1835. Removing again to Clarke County, where his mother still resided, he represented that county in the Alabama House of Representatives in 1849, and in the Senate in 1851. During the American Civil War, he led a vigilance committee which dealt out brutal violence to Union supporters, and despite the Union's victory, continued to hold local political offices afterwards. His large property, however, was destroyed by the results of the war. Northern friends who heard of his reverses advised his opening an office in Montgomery for the purchase of cotton on commission for their factories, and he did so with some success.

His wife died in 1872, and in 1875 he was again married to Margaret Briscoe, of Georgetown, Ky., who survived him. His last years were spent in Cincinnati, Ohio, and he died on September 19, 1888, in his 84th year, worn out with old age and infirmities, in Petoskey, Mich. He had visited that place annually for several years, on account of hay fever, from which he had long been a sufferer.
