= Thomas Austin (American football) =

American football player and coach (born 1986)

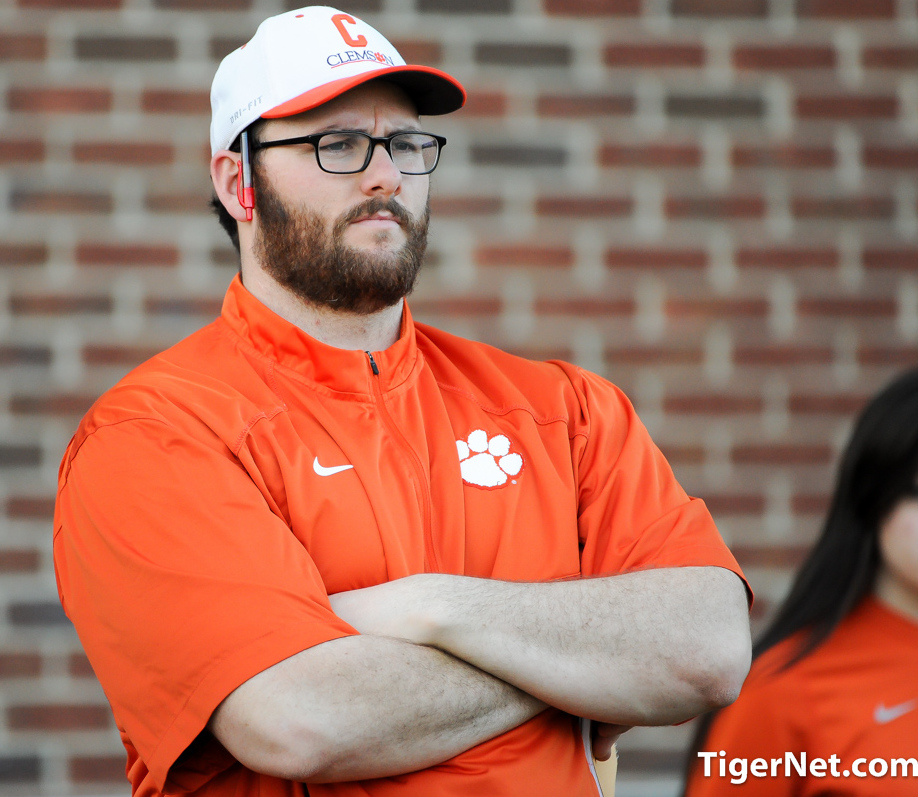

No. 61, 71, 65
- Position: Offensive line

Personal information
- Born: November 14, 1986 (age 39); West Point, New York, U.S.
- Listed height: 6 ft 3 in (1.91 m)
- Listed weight: 315 lb (143 kg)

Career information
- High school: Camden (SC)
- College: Clemson
- NFL draft: 2010: undrafted

Career history

Playing
- Minnesota Vikings (2010)*; New England Patriots (2010−2011)*; Houston Texans (2011); New England Patriots (2012)*; Carolina Panthers (2012); Indianapolis Colts (2013)
- * Offseason or practice squad member only

Coaching
- Clemson (2015−2018) Graduate assistant; Georgia State (2019−2020) Offensive line coach; Clemson (2021) Offensive analyst; Clemson (2022–2023) Offensive line coach

Awards and highlights
- As player: Third-team All-American (2009); 2× Second-team All-ACC (2008, 2009); As coach: CFP national champion (2016, 2018)

Career NFL statistics
- Games played: 8
- Games started: 1
- Stats at Pro Football Reference

Thomas Adam Austin V (born November 14, 1986) is an American college football coach and former player who was most recently the offensive line coach for the Clemson Tigers. He played professionally as a center in the National Football League (NFL). He was signed by the Minnesota Vikings as an undrafted free agent in 2010. He played collegiately for Clemson.

He has also been a member of the New England Patriots, Houston Texans, Carolina Panthers, and Indianapolis Colts.

== Early life ==
Austin attended Camden High School in Camden, South Carolina, where he played every position along the offensive line. He was a four-year letterman in football, and played on the AAA state title team as a freshman offensive tackle. He was an all-county, all-region, and all-area selection as a junior and senior. As a senior, he was named the top offensive lineman in South Carolina by The State. He was also named to all-state teams by The State, High School Sports Report, and SCVarsity.com. He was the upstate Lineman of the Year as a senior, and a Shrine Bowl starter at offensive tackle. Rivals.com rated him among the top ten Shrine Bowl players, and as the No. 20 offensive guard in the nation and the ninth best prospect in South Carolina.

He was also a three-year letterman in wrestling in high school, posting a 66–4 career record. He won the AAA state title as a junior and was a state finalist and North/South All-Star as a senior.

== College career ==
Austin chose to attend Clemson University over Maryland, Penn State, South Carolina, Vanderbilt, and Wake Forest. He redshirted as a freshman in 2005 and was named the offensive scout team player of the year by the Clemson coaching staff. In 2006, Austin played 177 snaps, posting 22 knockdown blocks and three intimidation blocks. As a sophomore in 2007, he started 12 games, including four at right guard and eight at center. He led the team in knockdown blocks with 90 and in offensive snaps with 780. He was twice named Atlantic Coast Conference Offensive Lineman of the Week and was an honorable mention sophomore All-American by CollegeFootballNews.com.

In 2008, as a junior, Austin started 13 games and was three times named ACC Offensive Lineman of the Week, while leading his team with 98 knockdown blocks. He was named to the All-ACC second-team as a center after the season. In 2009, Austin started every game again as a senior co-captain, and was named to the All-ACC second-team for a second straight season, this time as a guard. He was also named a third-team All-American by Sporting News, and led his team with 112 knockdown blocks in 2009.

== Professional career ==
Signed undrafted with the Minnesota Vikings in April 2010 and spent time with the New England Patriots, Houston Texans, Carolina Panthers, and Indianapolis Colts. Austin played in three games with the Texans in 2011, played in four games including one start with the Panthers in 2012, and played in one game with the Colts in 2013.

== Coaching career ==
Austin began his coaching career as a graduate assistant at his alma mater Clemson under Dabo Swinney in 2015 where he stayed until 2018. During his time as a Clemson graduate assistant, the Tigers went 55–4 with 4 ACC Championships, 19 wins over ranked opponents and two National Championships.

Austin joined fellow Camden, South Carolina native, Georgia State head coach Shawn Elliott as the Panthers' offensive line coach prior to the 2019 season. He stayed there until after the 2020 season.

In early 2021, Austin returned to Clemson as an offensive analyst. In December 2021 it was announced he would succeed 67-year-old Robbie Caldwell as the Tigers' offensive line coach for the 2022 season.
