= Lois Rhame West =

First Lady of South Carolina
- In role January 19, 1971 – January 21, 1975
- Governor: John C. West
- Preceded by: Josephine Robinson McNair
- Succeeded by: Ann Darlington Edwards

Personal details
- Born: September 5, 1921 Camden, South Carolina, U.S.
- Died: May 6, 2014 (aged 92) Hilton Head Island, South Carolina, U.S.
- Spouse: John C. West (1942–2004; his death)
- Education: Winthrop University (1939)
- Occupation: Health advocate

Lois Rhame West (September 5, 1921 – May 6, 2014) was an American health and physical fitness advocate, activist, and philanthropist. She served as First Lady of South Carolina from 1971 until 1975 during the administration of her husband, Governor John C. West. Rhame West, a former faculty member at the University of South Carolina, made physical education and wellness the focus of her tenure as the state's First Lady. West later became the first woman serve as president of the Muscular Dystrophy Association, a position she held for two terms. She served on the Muscular Dystrophy Association's national board of directors for forty years.

== Biography ==
West was born Lois Rhame on September 5, 1921, in Camden, South Carolina to Boykin W. and Annie L. Rhame. She graduated from Camden High School in 1939. She enrolled at Winthrop College, a women's college in Rock Hill, South Carolina, which is now known Winthrop University. She studied physical education. (Winthrop later became a co-educational school during the 1970s). She was active in collegiate athletics as a member of the women's field hockey, tennis and golf teams. On August 29, 1942, while still a college student, Rhame married John C. West at a ceremony in Fort Monmouth, New Jersey. She became the first Winthrop student to marry while in school and still graduate. Lois West received a bachelor's degree in physical education from Winthrop in 1943, becoming the first married woman to graduate from the college.

Lois West joined the faculty of the University of South Carolina, where she taught while her husband completed his law degree.

West campaigned statewide for her husband during his 1970 gubernatorial campaign. John West was sworn into office in January 1971 at a time when racial tensions were still high in the state. In his inaugural address, Governor West promised to make South Carolina "colorblind" and erase "any vestige of discrimination" from his government. His promises drew threats from the state's Ku Klux Klan. Lois West recognized the danger posed by the Klan to her husband. In a 1998 interview for an oral history project at the University of South Carolina, West recalled her reaction, "If they did something, there were enough Klan members on the grand jury (that) nobody ever got indicted"..."The Grand Dragon lived down near me...so I sent him a message that if anything happened to John, he didn't have to worry about the grand jury, because I'd come kill him right then...I said, 'Now you just remember, whether you do it or anybody else does it, I’m going to get four of you before daylight.'...Boy, they were careful about us after that, because they knew I meant it – and I did." However, despite the threats, she also noted, "In the long run, there are more good people than bad people...This is a good state. It’s a nice place to live. Of all the places we’ve been, this is the best."

West adopted physical fitness and health advocacy as the cornerstone of her tenure as First Lady from 1971 to 1975. She focused much of her work on the importance of physical education.

John West was appointed the United States Ambassador to Saudi Arabia from 1977 to 1981. Lois West accompanied with him to Saudi Arabia during his tenure.

The Wests became some of the first major donors to her alma mater, Winthrop University. Both were active in the transition to a coeducational institution during the 1970s. During the 1980s, the family established the Lois Rhame West Scholars program, which provided full scholarships to South Carolina residents. The university awarded her an Honorary Doctorate of Humane Letters in 1984.

Lois West served on the national board of directors for the Muscular Dystrophy Association (MDA) for forty years. Her tenure on the board included two terms as the first female president of the Muscular Dystropy Association. She was also a leader in both the state Cub Scouts and the Girl Scouts.

In 1998, Lois West and former Governor Carroll Campbell became the co-chairs of Winthrop University's first capital campaign. Under West and Campbell, the campaign brought in more than $30 million, which was utilized for research programs, scholarships, and improvements to the school's academic majors. She was honored as a "Distinguished Alumni in Physical Education" in 2001. In 2007, the university opened the Lois Rhame West Health, Physical Education and Wellness Center, the school's first LEED certified green building. Named in West's honor, the building houses the offices for several major programs of study, including the departments of physical therapy, sports management, and Sport and Human Performance.

Her husband of 61 years, former Governor and Ambassador John C. West, died in 2004.

Lois West died at her home in Hilton Head Island, South Carolina, on May 6, 2014, at the age of 92. Her funeral was held at Bethesda Presbyterian Church in Camden, South Carolina. She was buried in Forest Lawn Memorial Park, also located in Camden. She was survived by two of her three children, Shelton W. Bosley and John C. West Jr., and eleven grandchildren. She was predeceased by her husband, Governor John West, and their son, Douglas Allen West, as well as her four brothers and one sister.
