= Donald Leroy Truesdell =

American military officer (1906–1993)

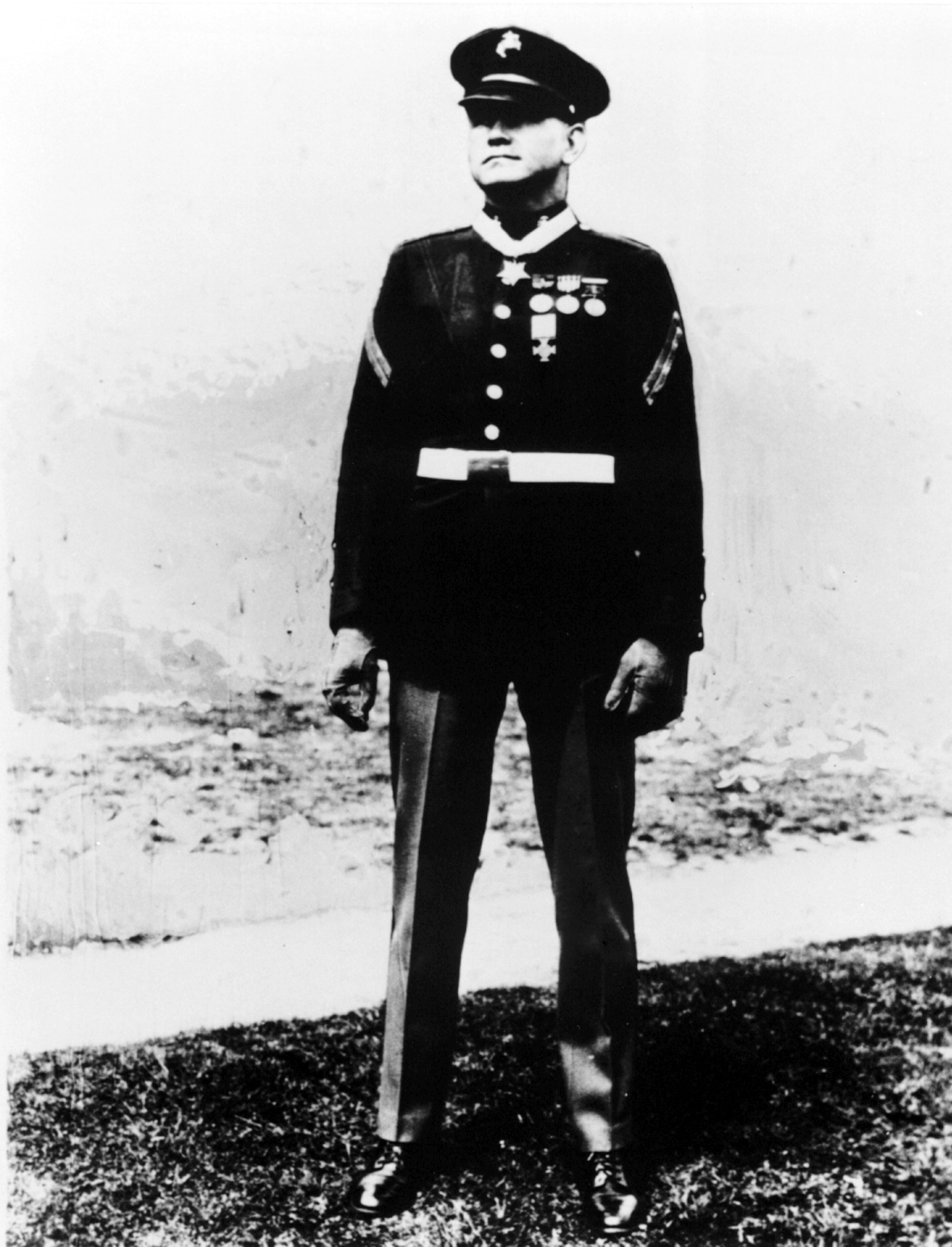
- Chief Warrant Officer Donald Truesdell
- Born: 8 August 1906; Lugoff, South Carolina
- Died: 21 September 1993 (aged 87); Lugoff, South Carolina
- Military career
- Allegiance: United States of America
- Branch: United States Marine Corps
- Service years: 1924 – 1946
- Rank: Chief warrant officer
- Conflicts: Occupation of Nicaragua; World War II
- Awards: Medal of Honor; Purple Heart; Nicaraguan Cross of Valor

Donald Leroy Truesdell (name changed from Truesdale to Truesdell on 25 July 1942) (August 8, 1906 – September 21, 1993) was a United States Marine Corps corporal who received the Medal of Honor for actions during the Occupation of Nicaragua. He attempted to throw away a rifle grenade at the cost of his right hand. He later obtained the rank of chief warrant officer. He was later given a posthumous memorial by the South Carolina General Assembly on May 19, 2004.

== Military career ==
Truesdale first enlisted with the Marines in November 1924 as a private. At the time of his Medal of Honor action, Truesdale was simultaneously a lieutenant in the Nicaraguan native army. Despite losing his right forearm, he continued to serve with the Marine Corps until his retirement as a chief warrant officer in May 1946.

== Medal of Honor citation ==
The President of the United States of America, in the name of Congress, takes pleasure in presenting the Medal of Honor to Corporal Donald L. Truesdale, USMC, for service in Nicaragua as set forth in the following:

Citation:

For extraordinary heroism in the line of his profession above and beyond the call of duty at the risk of his life, as second in command of a Guardia Nacional Patrol on 24 April 1932, engaged, at the time, in active operations in the field against armed bandit forces in the vicinity of Constancia, near Coco River, Department of Jinotega, Northern Nicaragua. While the patrol was in formation on the trail searching for a bandit group, with which contact had just previously been had, a rifle grenade fell from its carrier, carried by a member of the patrol, and struck a rock, igniting the detonator. Several men of the patrol were in close proximity to the grenade at the time. Corporal Truesdale, who was several yards away at the time, could easily have sought cover and safety for himself but instead, knowing full well the grenade would explode within two or three seconds, and with utter disregard for his own personal safety, and at the risk of his own life, rushed for the grenade, grasped it in his right hand and attempted to throw it away from the patrol before it exploded. The grenade exploded in his hand, blowing it off and inflicting multiple serious wounds on his body. Corporal Truesdale, by his actions, took the full shock of the explosion of the grenade upon himself, thereby saving the lives of, or serious injury to, his comrades in arms. His actions were worthy of the highest traditions of the profession of arms.

== See also ==
- List of Medal of Honor recipients
