= Kershaw County School District =

Public school district in Kershaw County, California

Kershaw County School District (KCSD) is a public school district in Kershaw County, South Carolina (US). Led by Superintendent of Schools Dr. Harrison Goodwin, KCSD serves 10,750+ students and employs 1,200 faculty members across 20 schools. The main office is located on West DeKalb Street in Camden, South Carolina.

The district's boundary parallels that of the county.

== History ==
In 2021 the district began hiring and paying students for some school support positions since there were not enough post-high school applicants for some of the positions.

== Technology ==
In the 2018–19 school year, all 20 schools are wireless and connected by a high-speed wide area network. Students and staff have full-time Internet access in classrooms, libraries and computer labs, including distance learning opportunities. Kershaw County was the first school district in South Carolina to provide individual wireless personal computing devices to all high school students through an $8 million i-CAN initiative in 2004. All teachers have personal computing devices, and all classrooms are equipped with interactive whiteboards. Students in grades 3–12 are 1:1; preK-2nd grade use technology on mobile carts.

== Facilities ==
In late 2007, the Kershaw County School District undertook a "Facilities Equalization" plan in an effort to give students the same opportunities throughout the county, regardless of where they lived. Phase 1 of the $102.2 million plan includes two new middle schools, Camden Middle School and Lugoff-Elgin Middle School, new wellness facilities at all three high schools, a new elementary school, and two elementary renovation projects.

In November 2016, voters in Kershaw County approved a two-question $129 million referendum to move forward with a number of critical school construction projects in the district. The referendum addressed aging facilities, growth and safety issues, addressing a total of 17 construction projects. Among the projects are four new facilities; Camden Elementary School, Lugoff Elementary School and Wateree Elementary School broke ground in May 2017 and estimate completion in December 2018. The fourth project, the Applied Technology Education Campus (ATEC), broke ground in December 2017 with the estimated opening of August 2019.

== High schools ==
-Schools

- North Central High School (Knights) - AA
- Camden High School (Bulldogs) - AAAA
- Lugoff-Elgin High School (Demons) - AAAAA Div. 2

– Career and Technology Education

- Woolard Technology Center - County-wide access

– Alternative Education

- Continuous Learning Center (CLC)

== Middle schools ==
- North Central Middle School (Patriots) - [NCHS]
- Camden Middle School (Eagles) - [CHS]
- Lugoff-Elgin Middle School (Leopards) - [LEHS]
- Leslie. M Stover Middle School (Tigers) - [LEHS]

== Elementary schools ==
- North Central Elementary School (Knights) - [NCMS]
- Midway Elementary School (Bobcats) - [NCMS]
- Camden Elementary School (Colts) - [CMS]
- Pine Tree Hill Elementary School (Bullpups) - [CMS]
- Jackson School (Bears) - [CMS]
- Blaney Elementary School (Wildcats) - [SMS]
- Doby's Mill Elementary School (Dolphins) - [SMS]
- Lugoff Elementary School (Counts) - [LEMS]
- Wateree Elementary School (Cardinals) - [LEMS]

== See also ==
- Lugoff-Elgin High School
- Camden High School (Camden, South Carolina)
- Camden Middle School
- Kershaw County, South Carolina
- Camden, South Carolina
- Lugoff, South Carolina
