= Chapman Levy =

American lawyer, officer in war of 1812

Chapman Levy (1787–1849) was a lawyer, officer in the War of 1812, state legislator, and plantation owner. He was born in Camden, South Carolina and grew up in Columbia, South Carolina. He worked as a lawyer in Camden. He was Jewish.

He was married to his first wife Flora for five years until she died in 1823. He remarried to wife Rosina who died in 1828. Both were sisters of Mordecai M. Levy.

He had a brickyard and owned about 30 slaves. He partnered with William McWillie and eventually moved to Mississippi with him.

In 1832 he wrote to Andrew Jackson. Levy was an uncle of Chapman Levy Anderson (who was named for him), the son of his sister Eliza Levy Anderson who married Dr. Edward H. Anderson.
