= Camden High School (Camden, South Carolina) =

Location
- 1022 Ehrenclou Drive; Camden, South Carolina 29020; United States
- Coordinates: 34°14′27″N 80°36′57″W

Information
- Type: Public
- Motto: "Honos Probitas Perfectio"
- School district: Kershaw County School District
- Principal: Rose Montgomery
- Grades: 9–12
- Enrollment: 1,123 (2023–2024)
- Campus type: Urban
- Colors: Gold and black
- Mascot: Bulldog
- Website: chs.kcsdschools.net

Camden High School is located in Camden, South Carolina, and is one of three high schools in the Kershaw County School District. It is the second largest high school. The school has approximately 980 students. It is home of the Camden Bulldogs.

In 2004, the district started its iCan laptop program. Since then, every incoming freshmen has received a computing device to be used for their next four years at the school.

== Campus ==
In 1992, Camden High School moved from Laurens Street, which became Camden Middle School, to its present location on Ehrenclou Drive.

== Athletics ==
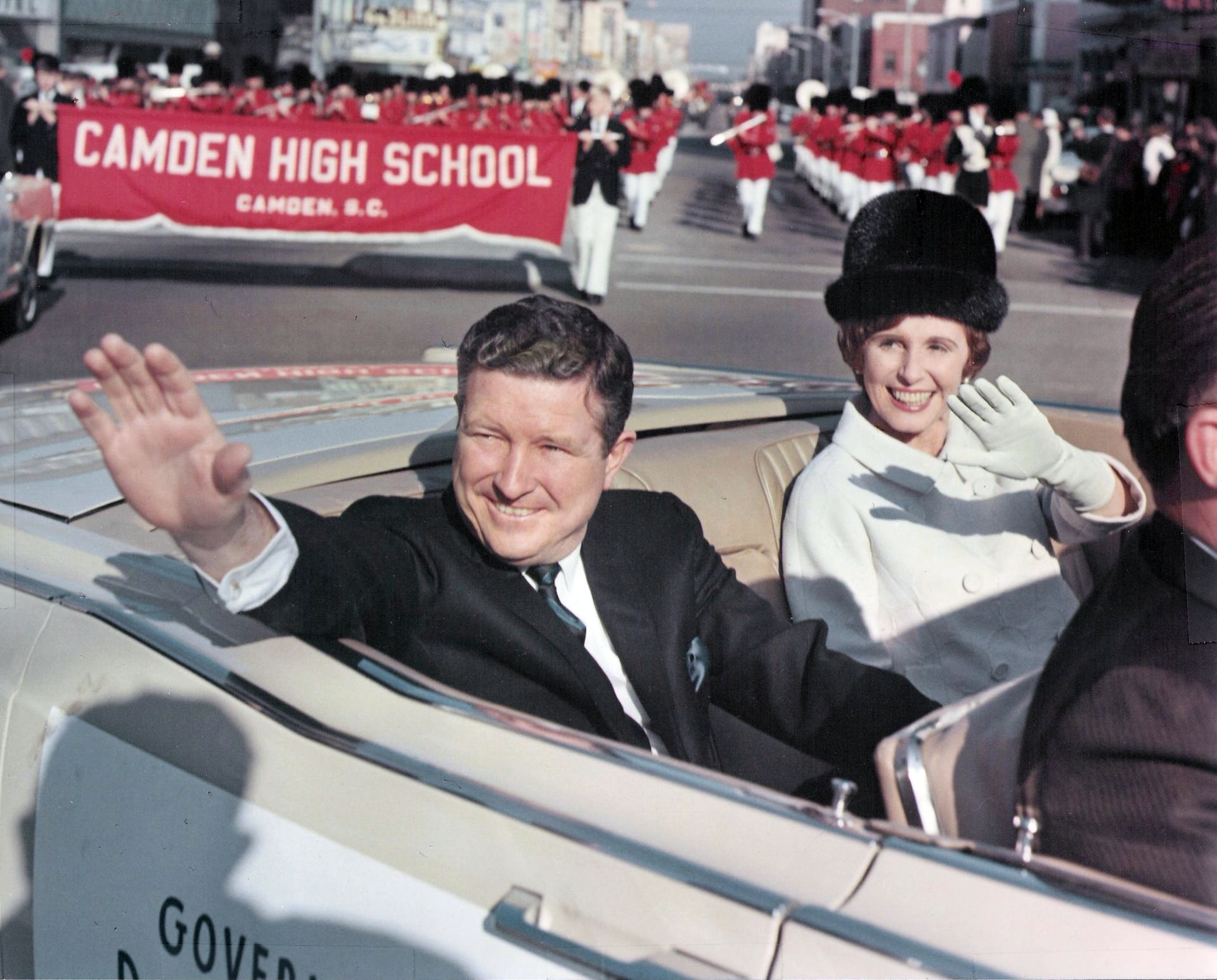
The Camden High School marching band at the inauguration of Governor Robert Evander McNair in 1967.

The school has won the following state championships:

- 1931 B Football
- 1936 B Football
- 1944 A Football
- 1956 AA Football
- 1963 AA Football
- 1990 AAA Football
- 2001 AAA Football
- 1956 A Baseball
- 1957 A Baseball
- 1958 AA Baseball
- 1988 AAA Baseball
- 1989 AAA Baseball
- 1993 AAA Volleyball
- 1994 AAA Volleyball
- 1995 AAA Volleyball
- 1951 A Boys' Basketball
- 1957 A Boys' Basketball
- 1958 AA Boys' Basketball
- 2009 AAA Boys' Basketball
- 1940 A Girls' Basketball
- 1942 A Girls' Basketball
- 1955 A Girls' Basketball
- 1957 A Girls' Basketball
- 2023 AAA Girls' Basketball
- 2024 AAA Girls' Basketball
- 1991 AAA Boys' Tennis
- 2022 AAA Boys' Tennis
- 2023 AAA Boys' Tennis

== Notable alumni ==
- Thomas Austin (American football), former professional American football player; coach at Clemson University
- Mel Byars, American historian; author, The Design Encyclopedia, The Museum of Modern Art; recipient, Besterman McColvin gold medal
- Joyce Edwards, basketball player
- Shawn Elliott, head football coach for Georgia State
- Bobby Engram, former professional American football player, current offensive coordinator for the Wisconsin Badgers
- Ike Hampton, former professional baseball player
- Vonnie Holliday, former professional American football player
- Michael Kohn, professional baseball player
- Jacqueline Van Landingham, Central Intelligence Officer
- Lois Rhame West (1939), former First Lady of South Carolina (1971–1975), first woman to chair the Muscular Dystrophy Association.
- Samuel E. Wright, actor, voice actor, and singer; known for voicing Sebastian in The Little Mermaid.
