= Camden, South Carolina =

- City
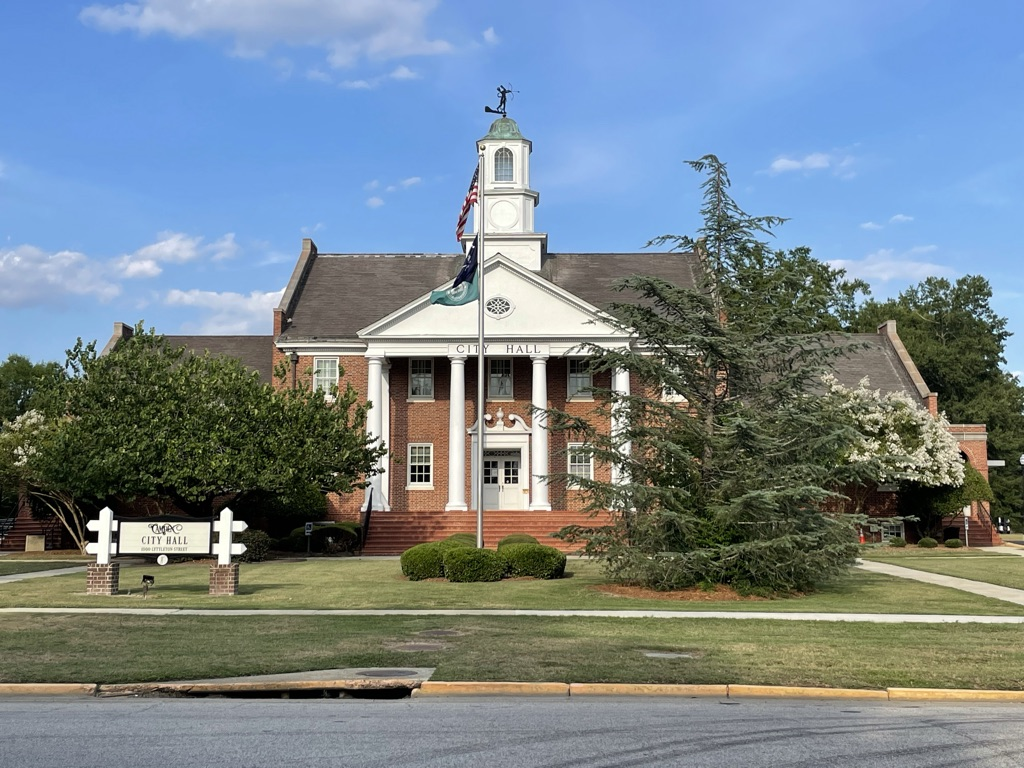
- Camden City Hall

- Seal
- Nickname: Steeplechase Capital of the World
- Motto: Experience Camden SC
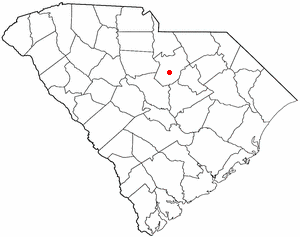
- Coordinates: 34°14′50″N 80°37′30″W
- Country: United States
- State: South Carolina
- County: Kershaw
- Founded: 1733

Government
  - Type: City manager-council
  - Mayor: Vincent Sheheen

Area
  - Total: 11.90 sq mi (30.82 km^{2})
  - Land: 11.11 sq mi (28.77 km^{2})
  - Water: 0.79 sq mi (2.05 km^{2})
- Elevation: 203 ft (62 m)

Population (2020)
  - Total: 7,788
  - Density: 701.2/sq mi (270.72/km^{2})
- Time zone: UTC−5 (Eastern)
  - Summer (DST): UTC−4 (Eastern)
- ZIP codes: 29020 & 29021
- Area codes: 803, 839
- FIPS code: 45-10855
- GNIS feature ID: 2403978
- Website: experiencecamdensc.com

Camden is the largest city in and the county seat of Kershaw County, South Carolina, United States. The population was 7,788 in the 2020 census, and the 2022 population estimate is 8,213. It is part of the Columbia, South Carolina, Metropolitan Statistical Area. Camden is the oldest inland city in South Carolina, and home to the Carolina Cup and the National Steeplechase Museum.

== Geography ==
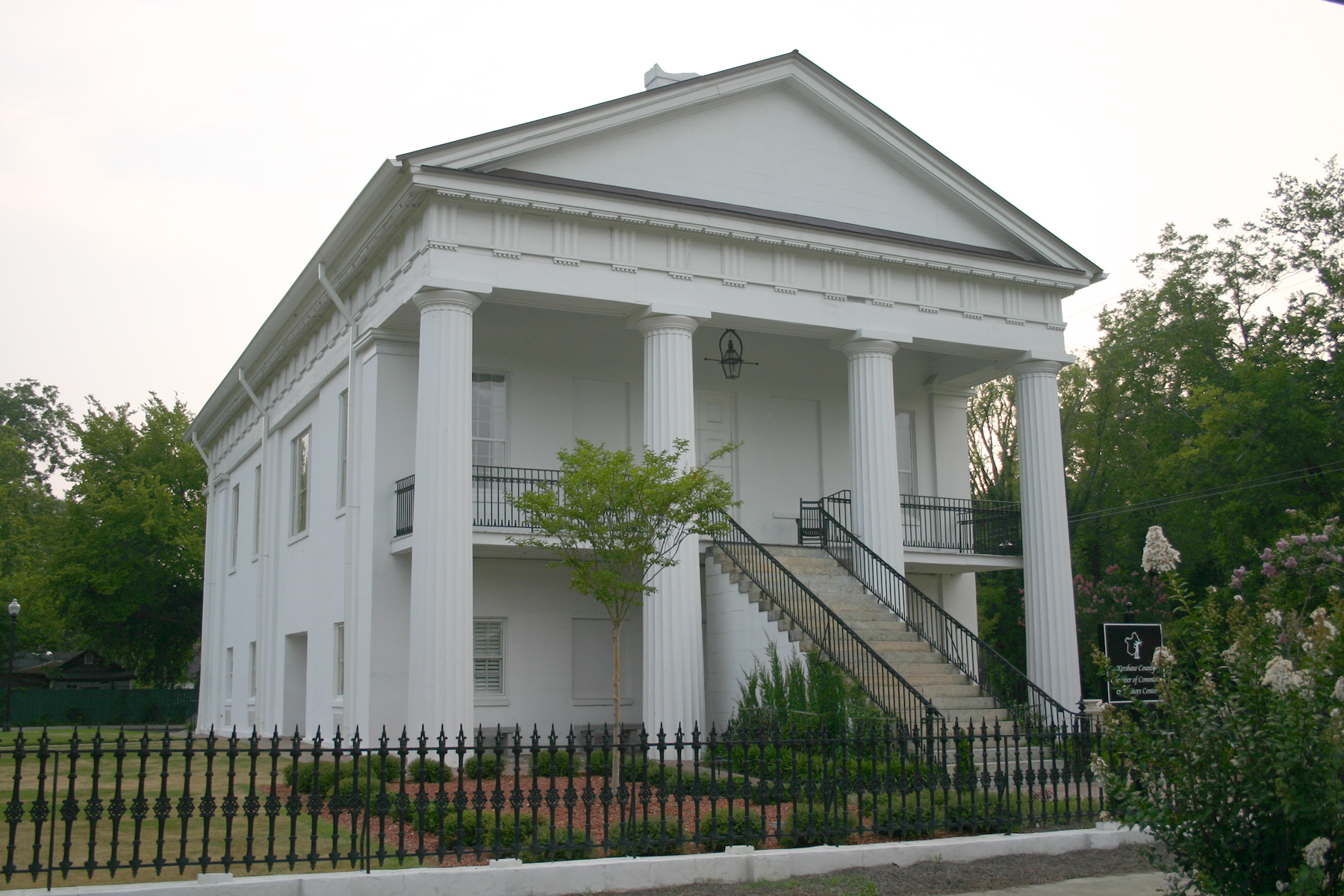
Original Kershaw County courthouse in Camden

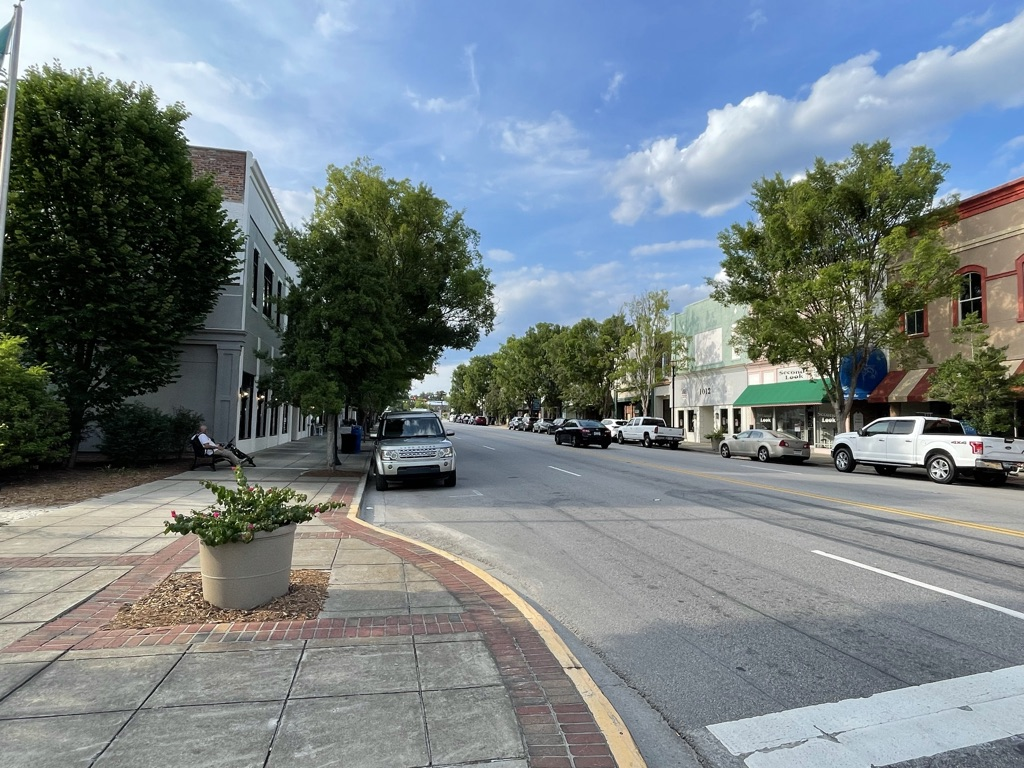
Downtown Camden, SC

Camden is located in the Midlands of South Carolina, in the south-central part of Kershaw County. It sits on the northeast side of the Wateree River, a south-flowing tributary of the Santee River. According to the United States Census Bureau, Camden has a total area of 11.39 square miles (29.49 km^{2}), of which 10.68 square miles (27.66 km^{2}) are land and 0.71 square miles (1.83 km^{2}), or 6%, are water.

U.S. Route 521 runs through downtown as Broad Street, leading 29 miles (47 km) southeast to Sumter, and 76 miles (122 km) north to Charlotte, North Carolina. US 601 runs with US 521 through downtown, leading 21 miles (34 km) north with US 521 to Kershaw, and south on its own 50 miles (80 km) to St. Matthews and 63 miles (101 km) to Orangeburg. US Route 1 (DeKalb Street) intersects with US 521 and 601 in downtown, leading 32 miles (51 km) southwest to the state capital, Columbia, and 61 miles (98 km) northeast to Cheraw. Interstate 20 passes 2 miles (3 km) south of the city's center; it leads east 50 miles (80 km) to Florence and southwest to Columbia.

=== Neighborhoods ===
- East Camden
- Knights Hill
- Dusty Bend
- Windsor Heights
- White Gardens
- Arrowwood
- The RaceTracks
- Sunnyhill

== History ==
=== Colonial years ===
Camden is the oldest inland city and the fourth oldest city in South Carolina. It is near the center of the Cofitachequi chiefdom that existed in the 1500s. In 1730, Camden became part of a township plan ordered by King George II. Kershaw County's official website states, "Originally laid out in 1732 as the town of Fredericksburg in the Wateree River swamp (south of the present town) when King George II ordered eleven inland townships established along South Carolina's rivers, few of the area settlers chose to take lots surveyed in the town, choosing the higher ground to the north. The township soon disappeared." In 1758, Joseph Kershaw from Yorkshire, England, came into the township, established a store, and renamed the town "Pine Tree Hill". Camden became the main inland trade center in the colony. Kershaw suggested that the town be renamed Camden, in honor of Lord Camden, a champion of colonial rights in the British Parliament. In the 1770s it was the site of an early American porcelain factory, established by John Bartlam.

=== American Revolution and antebellum era ===
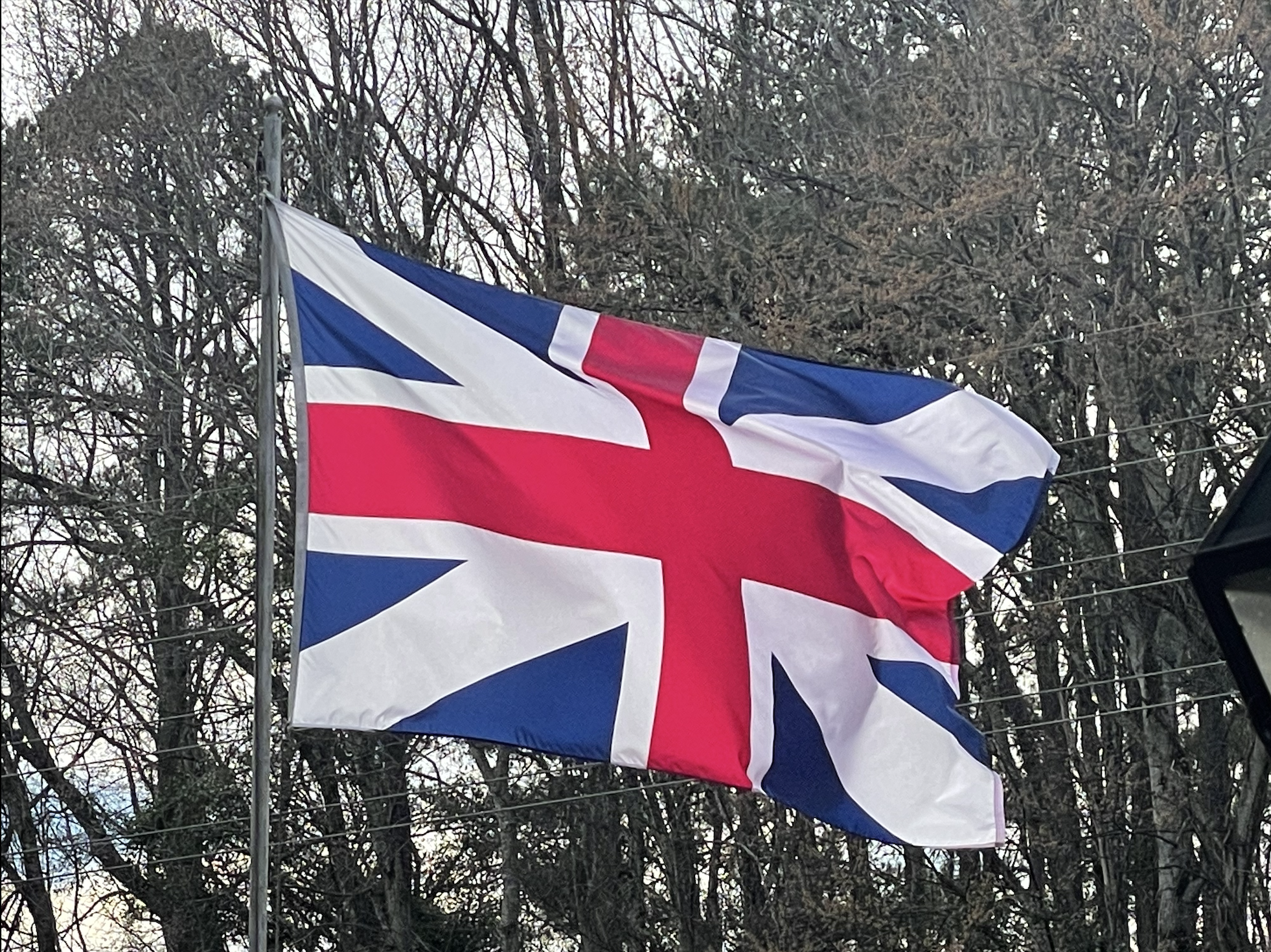
Flag of Great Britain in Camden, representing the city's connection to the Revolutionary War period.

May 1780 brought the American Revolution to Charleston, South Carolina, when it fell under the Crown's control. Lord Charles Cornwallis and 2,500 of his Loyalist and British troops marched to Camden and established there the main British supply post for the Southern campaign. The Battle of Camden, the worst American defeat of the Revolution, was fought on August 16, 1780, near Camden, and on April 25, 1781, the Battle of Hobkirk's Hill was fought between about 1,400 troops led by General Nathanael Greene and 950 Loyalists and British soldiers led by Lord Francis Rawdon. The latter battle was a costly win for the British and forced them to leave Camden and retreat to the coast.

After the Revolution, Camden's prominence and wealth grew as a major interior trading town with direct ties to Charleston and the world. Regional products, augmented with goods from the interior of North Carolina and far lands to the west were transported from Camden to Charleston on flat-bottom riverboats that plied the adjacent Wateree River before the railroad arrived in 1842. An Episcopal seminary opened in the town in 1857, but the campus burned during Sherman's invasion. The school did not reopen.

=== American Civil War and later years ===
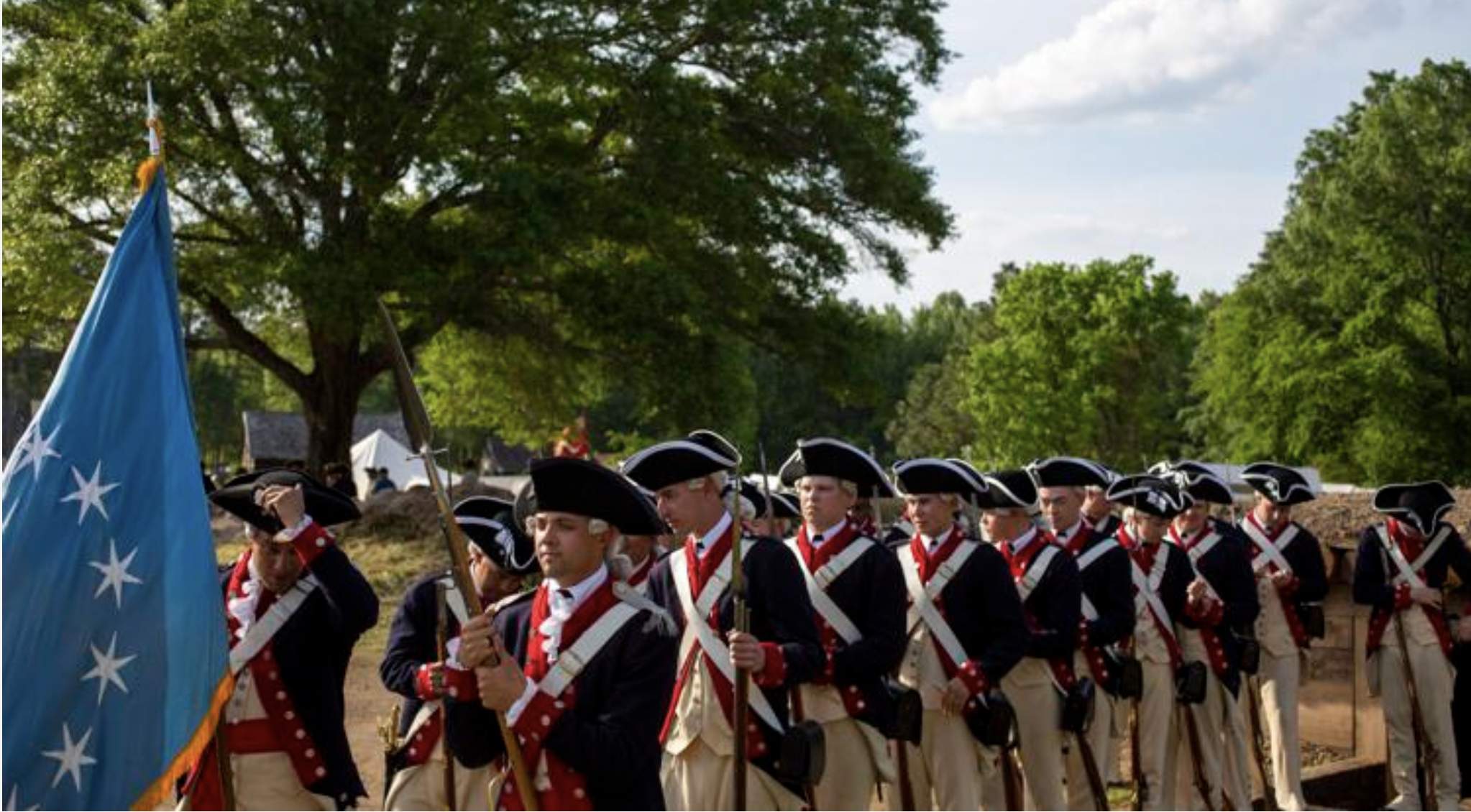
American Revolutionary War reenactment.

Camden was the source of six Confederate generals during the American Civil War. Richard Rowland Kirkland – "The Angel of Marye's Heights" – is interred in the Old Quaker Cemetery. At the end of the war, components of Sherman's army burned Confederate and nearby properties, including a full block of downtown buildings. The last Federal officer killed in the Civil War was 1st Lt E.L. Stevens of the 54th Massachusetts Infantry who died in a skirmish 9 miles south of Camden at the Battle of Boykin's Mill on April 18, 1865.

Starting in the mid-1880s the Camden area became an increasingly popular destination for wealthy northern families to spend the winter. Eventually, three resort hotels provided winter tourism activities well into the 1930s and beyond. The town became associated with many equestrian activities and is now the home of the third oldest active polo field in America. In the winter, more than 1,500 thoroughbreds call the area home. According to Kershaw County's web site, "Horse-related activities became very popular. That interest in equine activities has continued and today the horse industry is a major part of the county's economy. For that reason, the city is known as the 'Steeplechase Capital of the World'."

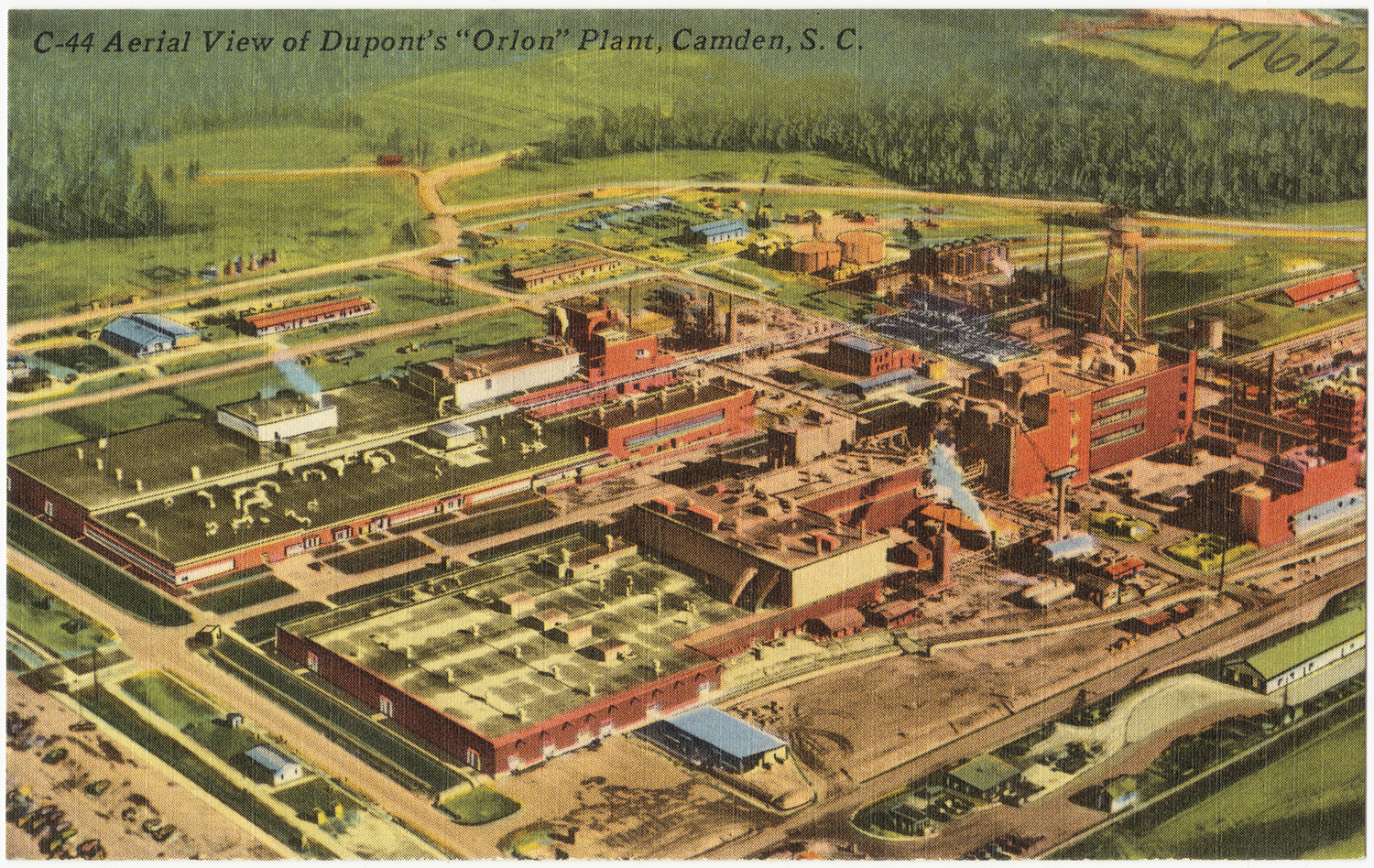
Aerial view of the Orlon Plant in Camden.

In 1950, Dupont opened the Dupont May Plant in Camden which manufactured Orlon. The plant was located on five miles of land and employed over 2,000 people. For many years it was the town's largest employer. In 1977, DuPont notified the National Institute for Occupational Safety and Health of a study the company conducted which showed an "excessive incidence and cancer mortality" rate among a cohort of workers who worked at the plant from 1950 to 1955. The findings were linked to a major chemical component of Orlon, acrylonitrile. Citing issues with foreign competition, Dupont ended the production of Orlon in 1990. Since the closure of the Orlon plant, the town has attracted a number of manufacturing companies such as Hengst GmbH & Co. and Haier. In 2003, Target opened an $85 million distribution center in the town.

=== Jewish community ===
Camden has long had a Jewish community. Members of the community have included David Camden de Leon, Mordecai M. Levy, Chapman Levy, and Bernard Baruch.

== Demographics ==
Historical population
Census	Pop.	Note	%±
1850	1,133		—
1860	1,621		43.1%
1870	1,007		−37.9%
1880	1,780		76.8%
1890	3,533		98.5%
1900	2,441		−30.9%
1910	3,569		46.2%
1920	3,930		10.1%
1930	5,183		31.9%
1940	5,747		10.9%
1950	6,986		21.6%
1960	6,842		−2.1%
1970	8,532		24.7%
1980	7,462		−12.5%
1990	6,696		−10.3%
2000	6,682		−0.2%
2010	6,838		2.3%
2020	7,788		13.9%
2025 (est.)	9,201	▲	18.1%
U.S. Decennial Census

=== 2020 census ===
As of the 2020 census, Camden had a population of 7,788. The median age was 44.3 years. 21.6% of residents were under the age of 18 and 24.0% of residents were 65 years of age or older. For every 100 females there were 84.0 males, and for every 100 females age 18 and over there were 80.2 males age 18 and over.

93.4% of residents lived in urban areas, while 6.6% lived in rural areas.

There were 3,337 households in Camden, of which 28.5% had children under the age of 18 living in them. Of all households, 41.7% were married-couple households, 17.4% were households with a male householder and no spouse or partner present, and 37.0% were households with a female householder and no spouse or partner present. About 34.3% of all households were made up of individuals and 18.7% had someone living alone who was 65 years of age or older.

There were 3,767 housing units, of which 11.4% were vacant. The homeowner vacancy rate was 2.8% and the rental vacancy rate was 6.9%.

Racial composition as of the 2020 census
Race	Number	Percent
White	4,796	61.6%
Black or African American	2,393	30.7%
American Indian and Alaska Native	23	0.3%
Asian	71	0.9%
Native Hawaiian and Other Pacific Islander	1	0.0%
Some other race	188	2.4%
Two or more races	316	4.1%
Hispanic or Latino (of any race)	338	4.3%

=== 2010 census ===
As of the census of 2010, there were 6,838 people living in the city limits, in 2,967 households and 1,800 families. The population density was 692.2 inhabitants per square mile (267.3/km^{2}). There were 3,544 housing units at an average density of 331.8 per square mile (128.1/km^{2}). The racial makeup of the city was 62.2% White, 35.1% African American, 0.20% Native American, 0.7% Asian, 0% Pacific Islander, 2.7% from other races, and 1.1% from two or more races. Hispanic or Latino people of any race were 2.4% of the population.

There were 2,967 households, out of which 27.7% had children under the age of 18 living with them, 41.1% were married couples living together, 16.5% had a female householder with no husband present, and 36.3% were non-families. 35.6% of all households were made up of individuals, and 18.9% had someone living alone who was 65 years of age or older. The average household size was 2.26 and the average family size was 2.94.

In the city, the population was spread out, with 21.9% under the age of 18, 20.1% from 18 to 39, 34.5% from 40 to 64, 17.3% from 65 to 84, and 4.3% who were 85 years of age or older. The median age was 45.3 years. 45.0% of the population was male and 55.0% of the population was female.

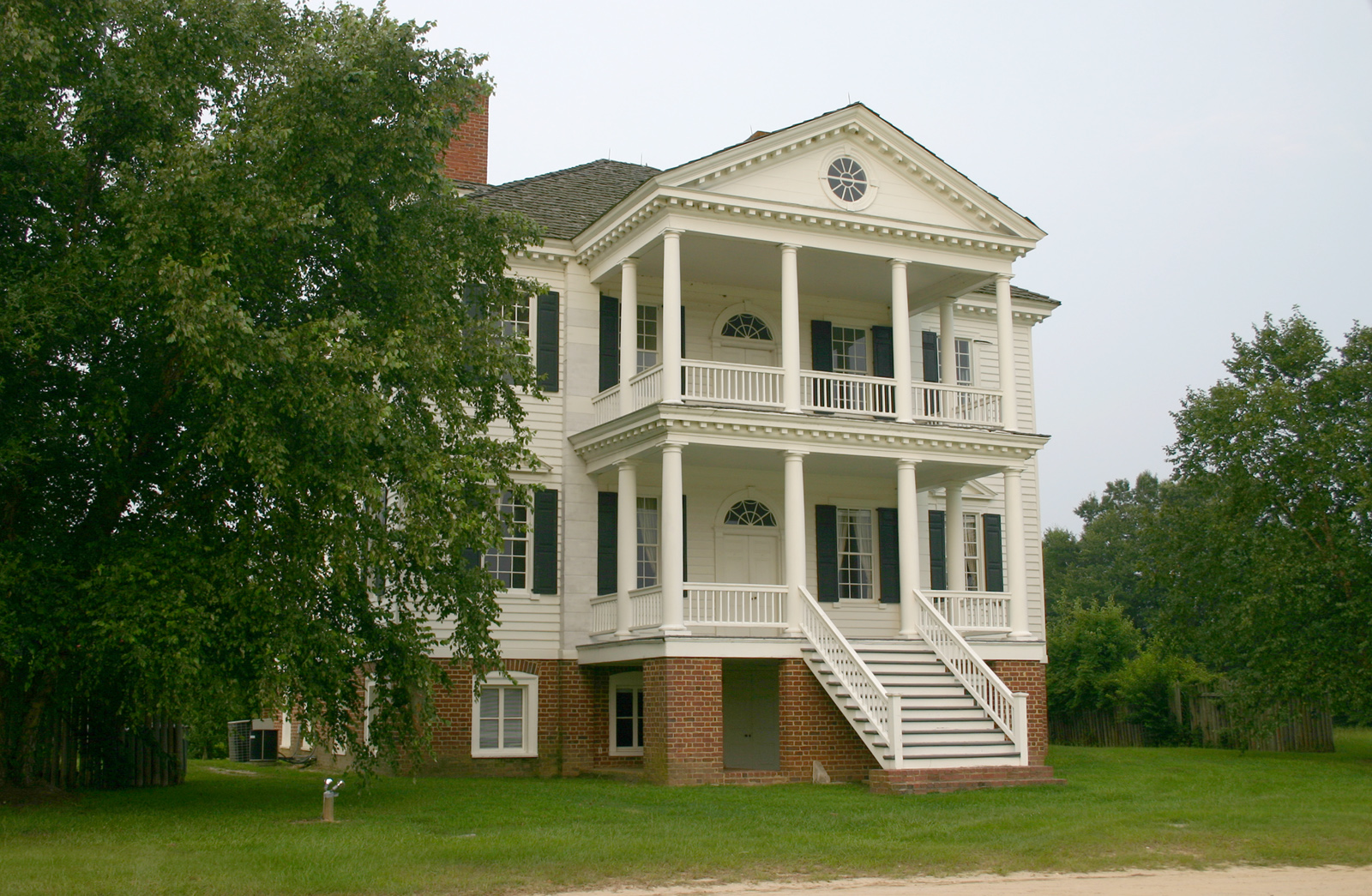
The Kershaw House, Georgian mansion first built, 1775–1780, by Joseph Kershaw, merchant and leading citizen of Camden became the headquarters for the occupying British army, 1780–1781. It burned in 1865, and was the object of an archaeological dig in 1968. Then it was rebuilt from 1974 to 1977.

The median income for a household in the city was $48,313, and the median income for a family was $62,140. Males had a median income of $42,597 versus $32,524 for females. The per capita income for the city was $26,385. About 13.7% of families and 15.4% of the population were below the poverty line, including 19.3% of those under age 18 and 13.2% of those aged 65 or over.

== Government ==
Camden has a city manager–council form of government. Alfred Mae Drakeford, an African American woman, was elected mayor of Camden in November 2016. Current City Council members are Hamilton Boykin; Joanna B. Craig and Stephen R. Smoak.

Camden has been represented in the South Carolina Senate by Vincent Sheheen, who was born in Camden; Penry Gustafson, Thomas McElveen, and currently by Jeffrey R. Graham, a former Camden Mayor and City Council member. Camden is part of South Carolina's 5th Congressional District, which is represented by Ralph Norman.

== Education ==
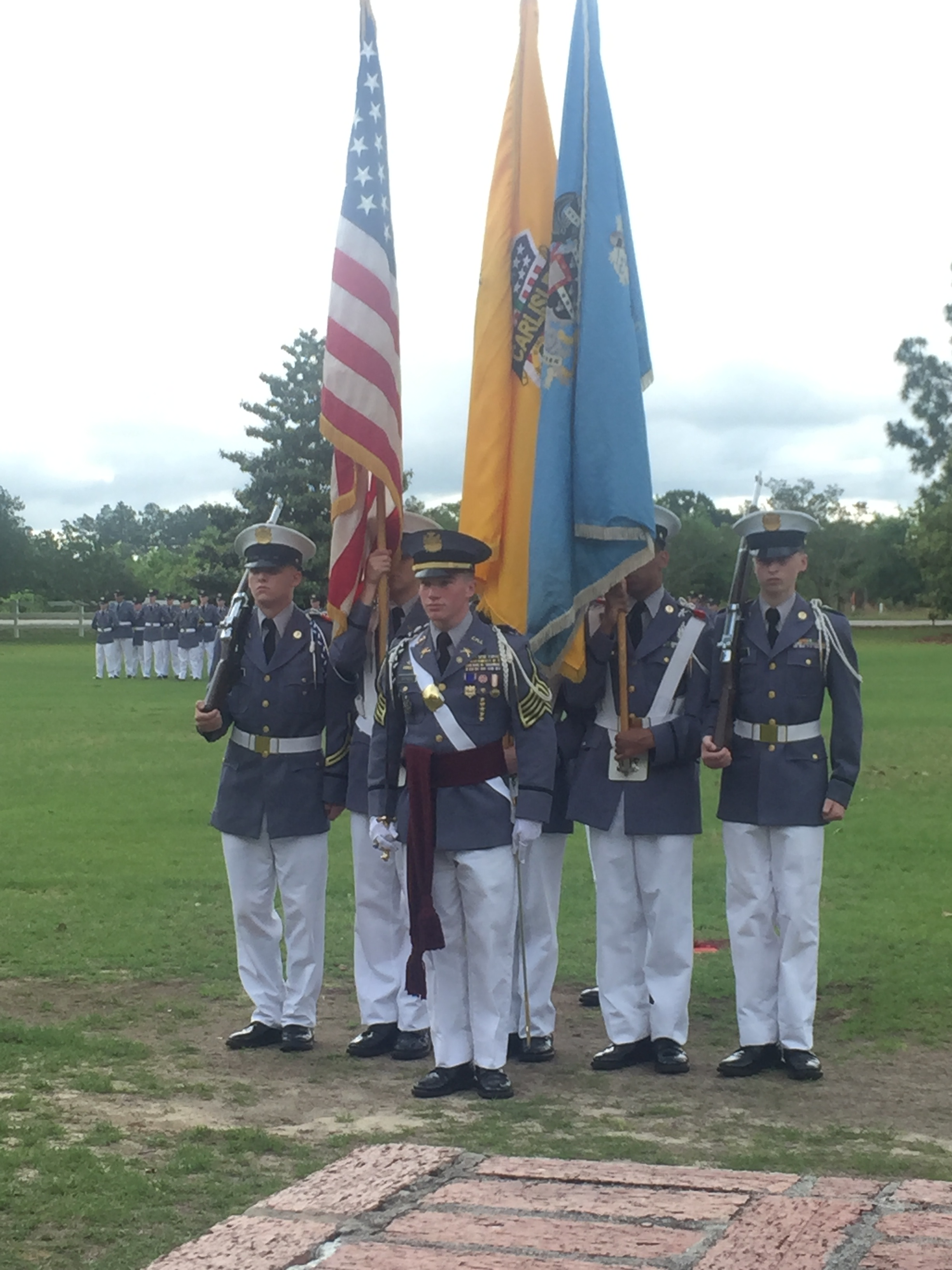
Cadets from Camden Military Academy perform in a parade.

The Kershaw County School District is the governing body of the public schools in the area. The district operates Pine Tree Hill Elementary School, Jackson Elementary School, Camden Elementary School, Woolard Technology Center (WTC), Camden Middle School, and Camden High School.

Camden Military Academy, the Montessori School of Camden, and Cornerstone Christian School are private institutions.

Central Carolina Technical College has two branches located in Camden.

Camden has a public library, a branch of the Kershaw County Library.

== Arts and culture ==
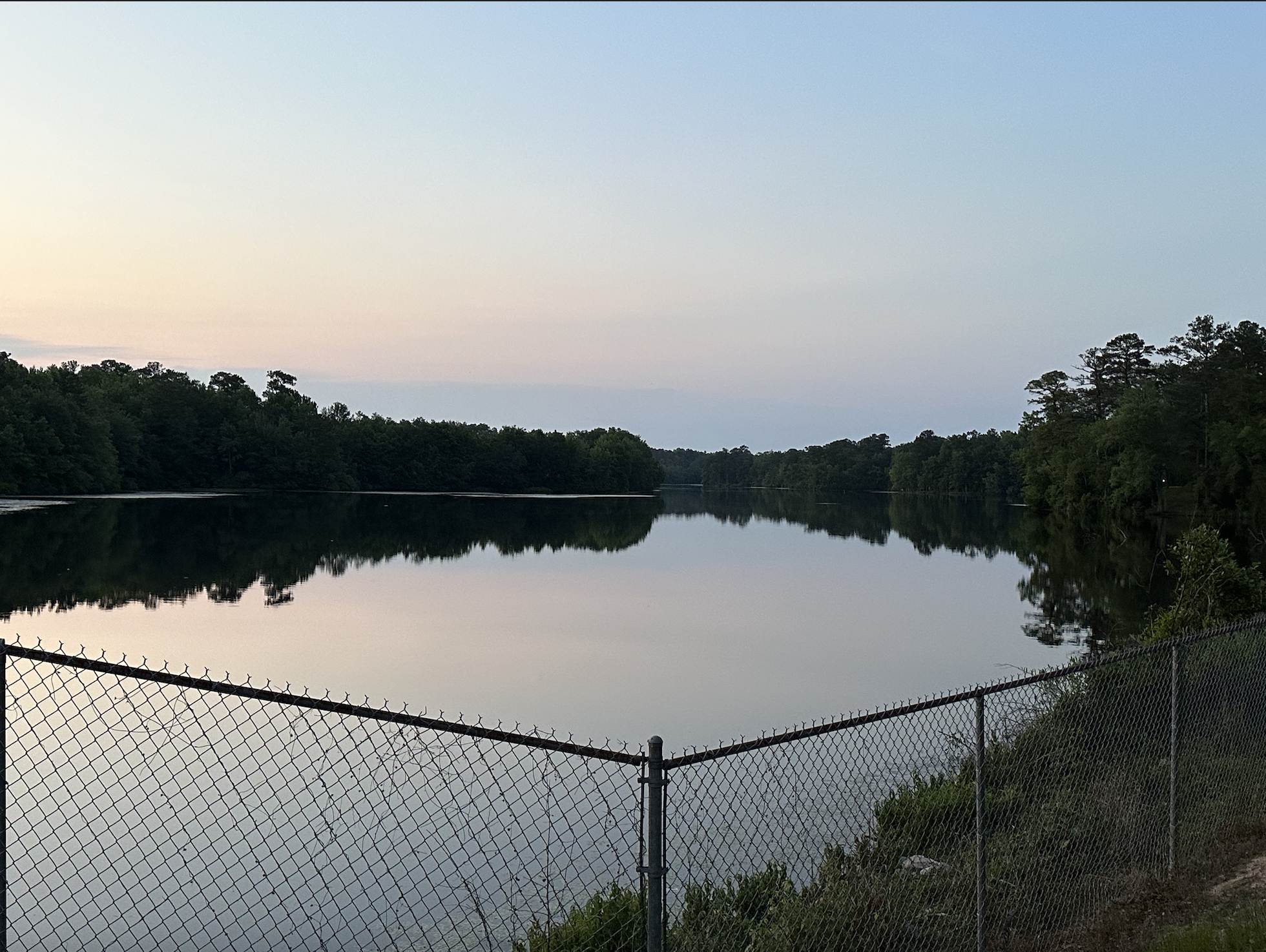
Kendall Lake in Camden, SC

The Carolina Cup is an annual event held on either the final Saturday in March or the first Saturday of April. The first race was held on March 22, 1930, and has been held every year since, with the exception of 1943 and 1945 during World War II and 2020 due to the coronavirus. The races have become a South Carolina tradition, and normally draw a crowd of over 70,000 spectators. "The Cup" has become a premier social sporting event in Camden and in South Carolina. The race is held at the Springdale Race Course, just north of Camden. The National Steeplechase Museum is located near the course. Among major steeplechase horse races, the Carolina Cup is unique that in South Carolina state law prohibits gambling on horse racing.

Held annually on the first Saturday of March, Irish Fest Camden draws over 2,000 visitors to its celebration of Saint Patrick's Day and Irish and Celtic culture. Founded in 2017, the festival features live Irish music and dancing, the Lucky Leprechaun 5K race, heavy event athletics, a kids zone, arts & crafts, a Medieval/Renaissance encampment, Irish wolfhounds, Gypsy Vanner horses, exotic birds, food trucks, and festive green beer.

Revolutionary War Field Days are the signature event of Historic Camden, held the first full weekend of November since 1970. Hundreds of reenactors from across the country converge on the grounds to camp, battle, and celebrate over the weekend. Visitors have a chance to be a spectator for a battle each day, and they will be able to walk through the camps of the combatants while seeing demonstrations of Colonial crafts and skills. Colonial sutlers (merchants) and scholars giving talks about the war are on site as well. More than 3,400 spectators and 350 reenactors and demonstrators attended the 2017 event.

== Transportation ==
=== Mass transit ===
The Santee-Wateree Regional Transit Authority (SWRTA) is responsible for mass transit within the Camden area. Camden's bus line is named after King Hagler, an 18th-century Catawba chief.

=== Rail ===
Camden is serviced by Amtrak's Floridian line. The line connects Camden to Columbia to the southwest and Hamlet, North Carolina to the northeast.

=== Air ===
- Seaboard Air Line Railway Depot
- Woodward Field (Kershaw County Airport)

== Media ==
The Chronicle-Independent has served as the local newspaper of Camden since 1889. WPUB-FM is a radio station licensed to Camden that broadcasts oldies format. WCAM 1590 is another radio station licensed to Camden, which broadcasts in adult standards format.

== Notable people ==
- Thomas Austin, NFL player
- Bernard Baruch, financier and presidential adviser
- Charles Bennett, NFL player
- Brook Benton, singer
- William F. Buckley Jr.'s family created the Buckley School of Public Speaking.
- Mary Chesnut, author and Civil War diarist
- Robert Clarkson, lawyer, tax protester
- Larry Doby, first African American to play in the American League, member of Baseball Hall of Fame
- Shawn Elliott, Head Collegiate Coach, Georgia State University
- Bobby Engram, NFL player
- Vonnie Holliday, NFL player
- Lorenzo James, 19th-century politician
- Joseph Brevard Kershaw (1822–1894), lawyer, judge and general
- Lane Kirkland (1922–1999), union leader of AFL–CIO
- Michael Kohn, Major League Baseball player
- Kathleen Parker, journalist, winner of 2010 Pulitzer Prize for commentary; resident of Camden
- Vincent Sheheen, state senator and 2010 Democratic nominee for governor
- Mendel L. Smith, politician and judge who served as Speaker of the South Carolina House of Representatives
- Jacqueline Van Landingham, Central Intelligence Agency officer
- Scipio Vaughan, former slave and founder of the influential Vaughan family in the United States and Nigeria.
- John C. West, Governor of South Carolina (1971–1975)
- Lois Rhame West, First Lady of South Carolina (1971–1975), first woman to chair the Muscular Dystrophy Association.
- Johnson Chesnut Whittaker (1858–1931), one of the first black men to win an appointment to the United States Military Academy at West Point
- Richie Williams, CFL player
- Samuel E. Wright, actor and Broadway performer

== See also ==
- List of historic landmarks in Camden, South Carolina
