= National Register of Historic Places listings in Kershaw County, South Carolina =

Location of Kershaw County in South Carolina

There are 20 properties and districts listed on the National Register of Historic Places in Kershaw County, South Carolina, United States, including three National Historic Landmarks. The locations of National Register properties and districts for which the latitude and longitude coordinates are included below, may be seen in a map.

This National Park Service list is complete through NPS recent listings posted August 8, 2025.

== Current listings ==
	Name on the Register	Image	Date listed	Location	City or town	Description
1	Adamson Mounds Site		July 16, 1970 (#70000591)	Address Restricted	Camden	
2	Belmont Neck Site -38KE06		February 3, 2006 (#05001578)	Address Restricted	Camden	
3	Bethesda Presbyterian Church	Bethesda Presbyterian Church	February 4, 1985 (#85003258)	502 Dekalb St. 34°14′46″N 80°36′19″W	Camden	
4	Boykin Mill Complex	Boykin Mill Complex	September 10, 1992 (#92001230)	8 miles south of Camden at the junction of South Carolina Highway 261 and County Road 2; 34°07′42″N 80°34′17″W	Camden	
5	Camden Battlefield	Camden Battlefield	October 15, 1966 (#66000707)	5 miles north of Camden on U.S. Routes 521 and 601; 34°20′47″N 80°36′27″W	Camden	
6	Zachariah Cantey House	Zachariah Cantey House	May 19, 1983 (#83002199)	County Road 92; 34°10′10″N 80°32′56″W	Camden	
7	Carter Hill		September 24, 1992 (#92001231)	10 miles south of Camden, east of U.S. Route 521; 34°08′08″N 80°32′57″W	Camden	
8	City of Camden Historic District	City of Camden Historic District	May 6, 1971 (#71000787)	Bounded on the south by the city limits, on the east and the west by the former Southern railroad right-of-way, and on the north by Dicey Creek Rd. 34°15′16″N 80°36′21″W	Camden	
9	Cool Springs	Cool Springs	September 28, 1989 (#89001596)	726 Kershaw Highway; 34°17′37″N 80°36′36″W	Camden	
10	Thomas English House	Thomas English House	July 22, 1993 (#82003871)	South Carolina Highway 92, 0.6 miles west of its junction with South Carolina Highway 93; 34°10′17″N 80°32′26″W	Camden	
11	Historic Camden Revolutionary War Restoration	Historic Camden Revolutionary War Restoration	July 29, 1969 (#69000170)	Southern area of the city, near DeKalb; 34°13′52″N 80°36′52″W	Camden	
12	Kendall Mill Historic District	Kendall Mill Historic District	March 19, 1982 (#82003870)	Roughly bounded by railroad tracks, Kendall Lake, Lakeshore Dr., McRae Rd., and Haile St. 34°15′33″N 80°35′28″W	Camden	
13	Liberty Hill Historic District	Liberty Hill Historic District	November 14, 1978 (#78002519)	South Carolina Highway 97; 34°28′18″N 80°48′13″W	Liberty Hill	
14	Benjamin McCoy House		August 7, 1980 (#80003674)	South of Cassatt on South Carolina Highway 15; 34°19′39″N 80°25′59″W	Cassatt	
15	McDowell Site		July 16, 1970 (#70000592)	Address Restricted	Camden	
16	Midfield Plantation		April 20, 1978 (#78002518)	Northeast of Boykin on South Carolina Highway 23; 34°07′40″N 80°33′28″W	Boykin	
17	Mulberry Plantation (Chesnut House)	Mulberry Plantation (Chesnut House)	November 25, 1980 (#80003673)	559 Sumter Highway; 34°12′23″N 80°35′31″W	Camden	
18	Plane Hill		September 26, 2022 (#100007390)	691 Cantey Ln. 34°10′58″N 80°31′42″W	Rembert vicinity	
19	Russell-Heath House	Russell-Heath House	February 14, 1990 (#90000006)	South Carolina Highway 522, west of its junction with County Road 2088; 34°32′23″N 80°44′25″W	Stoneboro	
20	Seaboard Air Line Railway Depot	Seaboard Air Line Railway Depot	June 2, 2000 (#00000590)	1100 W. DeKalb St. (U.S. Route 1); 34°14′53″N 80°37′30″W	Camden	

== See also ==
- List of National Historic Landmarks in South Carolina
- National Register of Historic Places listings in South Carolina
