= List of historic landmarks in Camden, South Carolina =

This is a list of landmarks in Camden, South Carolina, United States.

== Historic landmarks ==
Name	Image	Location	Notes
Adamson Mounds Site			Prehiric Native American Village- 8 Acres
Battle of Hobkirk's Hill			"The Second Battle of Camden"- April 25, 1781
Belmont Neck Site -38KE06			Location of mound and town associated with Native American chiefdom of Cofitachequi
Bethesda Presbyterian Church		502 DeKalb Street	Main Church Building was built in 1822
Boykin Mill Complex		Junction of South Carolina Highway 261 and County Road 2	"Mill Tract Plantation"
Camden Battlefield		On U.S. Routes 521 and 601	Site of the Battle of Camden on August 16, 1780
Carter Hill		Swift Creek, Kershaw County	Plantation complex, Overseers house was built in 1840
City of Camden Historic District		Bounded on S by city limits, on E and W by Southern RR. right-of-way, and on N by Dicey Creek Rd.	Encompasses 48 contributing buildings, 8 contributing sites, 2 structures and 3 contributing objects
Cool Springs (Camden, South Carolina)		726 Kershaw Highway	Built in 1832- 16 Acres
Historic Camden Revolutionary War Site		222 Broad St.	Open-air museum & one of the largest tourist attractions- 107 acres
Kendall Mill Historic District		90 East Hampton St.	Encompasses 119 contributing buildings, 1 contributing site and 1 contributing structure- Opened in 1901
Old Quaker Cemetery		713 Meeting St.	First known as Pine Tree Hill- established in 1750
