= Cool Springs =

Cool Springs, CoolSprings, and Cool Spring may refer to:

- Cool Spring, Delaware
- Cool Springs (Missouri)
- Cool Spring, South Carolina
- Cool Springs (Carvers Creek, North Carolina), listed on the NRHP in North Carolina
- Cool Springs (Camden, South Carolina), listed on the NRHP in South Carolina
- Cool Springs (Nashville, Tennessee), an edge city in greater Nashville, Tennessee
  - CoolSprings Galleria
- Cool Spring Farm (Charles Town, West Virginia)
- Cool Spring Farm (Gerrardstown, West Virginia)
- Cool Spring Place

== See also ==
- Battle of Cool Spring
