= Carter Hill =

Carter Hill may refer to:

- Carter Hill (Camden, South Carolina), listed on the NRHP in South Carolina
- Carter Hill (Lebanon, Virginia), listed on the NRHP in Virginia

== See also ==
- Carter Hall (disambiguation)
