= Cantey =

Cantey is a surname. Notable people with the surname include:

- Charlsie Cantey (born c. 1946), American sportscaster
- James Cantey (1818–1874), American lawyer, slave owner, politician, and Confederate Army brigadier general
- James Willis Cantey (1794–1860), American brigadier general and politician
- Wilbert Cantey (died 2008), one of the four people who discovered Blackjack's Basic Strategy

== Places ==
- Cantey, South Carolina, an unincorporated community
- Zachariah Cantey House, South Carolina

== See also ==
- Zachariah Cantey Deas, American cotton broker and Confederate Army brigadier general
