= Abney Crossroads, South Carolina =

- Census-designated place
- Location within South Carolina Location within the United States
- Coordinates: 34°30′09″N 80°30′43″W
- Country: United States
- State: South Carolina
- County: Kershaw

Area
  - Total: 0.46 sq mi (1.18 km^{2})
  - Land: 0.46 sq mi (1.18 km^{2})
  - Water: 0 sq mi (0.00 km^{2})
- Elevation: 390 ft (120 m)

Population (2020)
  - Total: 101
  - Density: 221.9/sq mi (85.69/km^{2})
- Time zone: UTC-5 (Eastern (EST))
  - Summer (DST): UTC-4 (EDT)
- ZIP Code: 29067 (Kershaw)
- Area codes: 803/839
- FIPS code: 45-00165
- GNIS feature ID: 2812969

Abney Crossroads is an unincorporated community and census-designated place (CDP) in Kershaw County, South Carolina, United States. It was first listed as a CDP prior to the 2020 census.

The CDP is in northern Kershaw County, along South Carolina Highway 341, which leads northwest 5 miles (8 km) to Kershaw and southeast 12 miles (19 km) to Bethune.

== Demographics ==
Historical population
| Census | Pop. | Note | %± |
|---|---|---|---|
| 2020 | 101 | | — |
U.S. Decennial Census

Abney Crossroads first appeared as a census designated place in the 2020 U.S. census.
