= DeKalb, South Carolina =

- Unincorporated community
- Location within South Carolina Location within the United States
- Coordinates: 34°22′39″N 80°35′45″W
- Country: United States
- State: South Carolina
- County: Kershaw
- Elevation: 417 ft (127 m)
- Time zone: UTC-5 (Eastern (EST))
  - Summer (DST): UTC-4 (EDT)
- ZIP code: 29175
- Area codes: 803, 839
- GNIS feature ID: 1247505

DeKalb is an unincorporated community in Kershaw County, South Carolina, United States. Its ZIP code is 29175. It is located on US Route 521, 9 miles north of Camden. The community is named for Baron DeKalb.
