= Agnes of Glasgow =

18th-century Scottish woman

Creature information
- Grouping: Ghosts
- Sub grouping: Site-Specific Ghosts
- Similar entities: The Witch of Saratoga, similar tale of a woman who followed her British soldier lover to New York and reportedly haunts the area of Saratoga Springs

Origin
- First attested: 1780s
- Country: United States
- Region: South Carolina

Agnes of Glasgow (1760–1780) is an apparition of a Scottish woman born in Glasgow who went on to live in America during the American Revolution, and who, according to the legend, is said to haunt the Bethesda Presbyterian Church (Camden, South Carolina).

== Folklore ==
=== Background ===
Born in Glasgow, Scotland, Agnes followed her lover, Lt. Angus McPherson, who was a British Army officer, to America during the American Revolution. She stowed away on a ship bound from England to America, arriving in Charleston, South Carolina. Believing his unit was assigned near Camden, in Kershaw County, South Carolina, and having heard that he may have been wounded, she wandered through towns and the wilderness hoping to make contact with him or someone who knew him. However, she became ill and died in 1780 before she could find him. As legend goes, she was buried under cover of darkness by Wateree American Indian King Hagler, who had befriended her.

=== Legend ===
Local legend maintains that she searches for her lover still, and that her ghost haunts the Bethesda Presbyterian Church where she was buried, and the surrounding wooded area to present day. The legend is such that it has received media attention in South Carolina, as well as ghost hunters from around the country. Local historians confirm that the British Army did arrive and fight the Battle of Camden during that year, but since her tombstone reads she died on 12 February, they would not have been in Camden at the time of her death. Also, Hagler died in 1763, at which time Agnes was still a child in Scotland.

== See also ==
- List of ghosts
