= List of ghost towns in South Carolina =

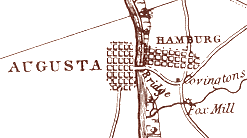
Hamburg, South Carolina as shown in Mills' Atlas, 1825

This is an incomplete list of ghost towns in South Carolina.

- Andersonville
- Dorchester
- Dunbarton
- Ellenton
- Ferguson
- Fort Motte
- Granby
- Hamburg
- Hawthorne
- Kingville
- Leigh
- Manchester
- Meyers Mill
- Mettzendorf
- Newell
- Pickens Courthouse
- Pinckneyville
- Purrysburg
- Robbins
