= East Camden =

East Camden may refer to:

- East Camden, Arkansas, a city in Arkansas
- East Camden, New Jersey, a neighborhood
- East Camden, South Carolina, an unincorporated community and census-designated place in South Carolina
