= Salem County, South Carolina =

Coordinates: 34°N 80°W

Salem County was a former county in east central of South Carolina. It was created in 1791 from Claremont and Clarendon counties and lasted until it was absorbed into the newly created Sumter District in 1800.
