= East Camden, South Carolina =

- Census-designated place
- Location within South Carolina Location within the United States
- Coordinates: 34°15′43″N 80°34′26″W
- Country: United States
- State: South Carolina
- County: Kershaw

Area
  - Total: 3.58 sq mi (9.27 km^{2})
  - Land: 3.58 sq mi (9.27 km^{2})
  - Water: 0 sq mi (0.00 km^{2})
- Elevation: 282 ft (86 m)

Population (2020)
  - Total: 3,215
  - Density: 898.0/sq mi (346.73/km^{2})
- Time zone: UTC-5 (Eastern (EST))
  - Summer (DST): UTC-4 (EDT)
- ZIP Code: 29020 (Camden)
- Area codes: 803/839
- FIPS code: 45-22050
- GNIS feature ID: 2807063

East Camden is an unincorporated area and census-designated place (CDP) in Kershaw County, South Carolina, United States. It was first listed as a CDP prior to the 2020 census with a population of 3,215.

East Camden is in south-central Kershaw County, bordered to the southwest and south by the city of Camden, the county seat. The CDP includes the community of Du Bose Park. U.S. Route 1 passes through the CDP, leading southwest into Camden and northeast 18 miles (29 km) to Bethune.

== Demographics ==
Historical population
Census	Pop.	Note	%±
2020	3,215		—
U.S. Decennial Census; 2020

East Camden first appeared as a census designated place in the 2020 U.S. census.

=== 2020 census ===
As of the 2020 census, East Camden had a population of 3,215. The median age was 40.7 years. 21.6% of residents were under the age of 18 and 19.4% of residents were 65 years of age or older. For every 100 females there were 89.3 males, and for every 100 females age 18 and over there were 86.5 males age 18 and over.

100.0% of residents lived in urban areas, while 0.0% lived in rural areas.

There were 1,352 households in East Camden, of which 27.4% had children under the age of 18 living in them. Of all households, 40.9% were married-couple households, 19.7% were households with a male householder and no spouse or partner present, and 32.8% were households with a female householder and no spouse or partner present. About 30.9% of all households were made up of individuals and 16.1% had someone living alone who was 65 years of age or older.

There were 1,521 housing units, of which 11.1% were vacant. The homeowner vacancy rate was 2.2% and the rental vacancy rate was 6.7%.

East Camden CDP, South Carolina – Demographic Profile (NH = Non-Hispanic)
Race / Ethnicity	Pop 2020	% 2020
White alone (NH)	2,016	62.71%
Black or African American alone (NH)	737	22.92%
Native American or Alaska Native alone (NH)	2	0.06%
Asian alone (NH)	9	0.28%
Pacific Islander alone (NH)	0	0.00%
Some Other Race alone (NH)	11	0.34%
Mixed Race/Multi-Racial (NH)	114	3.55%
Hispanic or Latino (any race)	326	10.14%
Total	3,215	100.00%

Note: the US Census treats Hispanic/Latino as an ethnic category. This table excludes Latinos from the racial categories and assigns them to a separate category. Hispanics/Latinos can be of any race.
