= McDowell Site =

Archaeological site in South Carolina, United States

- U.S. National Register of Historic Places
- Nearest city: Camden, South Carolina
- Area: 30 acres (12 ha)
- Built: 1848
- Architectural style: Temple mound
- NRHP reference No.: 70000592
- Added to NRHP: July 16, 1970

The McDowell Site, also known as Chesnut Mounds, Taylor Mounds, and Mulberry Plantation House, is a set of historic mounds located near Camden, Kershaw County, South Carolina. The McDowell Site is among the first archaeological sites to be carefully excavated and archaeologically reported in the United States. It represents a widespread late prehistoric Indian culture known by the names of Lamar, Irene, and Pee Dee, and possibly extends into protohistoric and historic times. It probably dates between AD 1400 and AD 1700.

It was listed on the National Register of Historic Places in 1970. It is located on the grounds of the Mulberry Plantation, one of the largest 18th-century plantations in the region.
