= Mulberry Plantation (Kershaw County, South Carolina) =

Historic house in South Carolina, United States

- Mulberry Plantation (Chesnut House)
- U.S. National Register of Historic Places
- U.S. National Historic Landmark
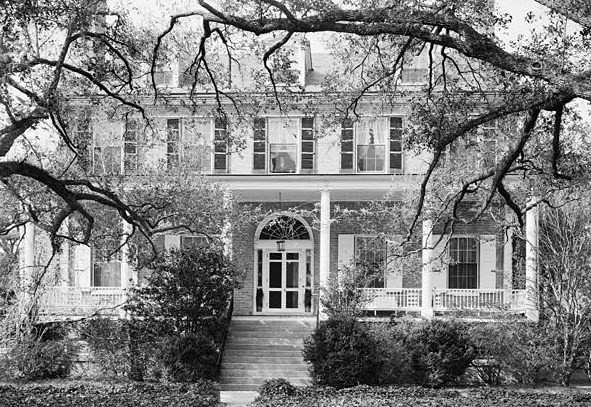
- Mulberry Plantation

- Location within South Carolina Location within the United States
- Nearest city: 559 Sumter Highway, Camden, South Carolina
- Coordinates: 34°12′23.5″N 80°35′31″W
- Area: 4,100 acres (1,700 ha) (size of NHL-listed area); 4,800 acres (1,900 ha) (size of plantation)
- Built: 1820
- Architectural style: Federal
- NRHP reference No.: 80003673

Significant dates
- Added to NRHP: November 25, 1980
- Designated NHL: February 16, 2000

Mulberry Plantation, also known as the James and Mary Boykin Chesnut House, is a historic plantation at 559 Sumter Highway (United States Route 521) south of Camden, South Carolina. Declared a National Historic Landmark in 2000, it is significant as the home of American Civil War chronicler Mary Boykin Chesnut, who produced some of the most important written accounts of the war from a Confederate perspective. The main house, built about 1820, is a fine example of Federal period architecture.

== Description and history ==
Mulberry Plantation is located about 3 miles (4.8 km) south of downtown Camden, and occupies more than 4,800 acres (1,900 ha) of land bordering the Wateree River. The main plantation house is located on a high point of the property, about 0.25 miles (0.40 km) east of Sumter Highway, and is accessed via a drive from that road. An early 20th-century wrought iron gate, spelling "Mulberry" within its elements, stands across the road between brick piers. The main house is a handsome Federal period brick house, 3 1/2 stories in height, that was built about 1820, with possible design input from the noted South Carolina architect Robert Mills.

The plantation has a documented history of human habitation dating back as far as about 1250 CE, based on archaeological research of platform mounds found on the property. It is believed to be the site of Cofitachequi, a major chiefdom visited by the explorer Hernando de Soto in the 16th century, and is also the location of a second archaeological site, the McDowell Site.

The plantation was established in the 1760s by James Chesnut, and passed first to his brother John, and then to John's son, James Chesnut Sr. (1775–1866) Under his stewardship, the plantation was one of the largest and most successful inland plantations in the state, growing to a maximum size of more than 12,000 acres (4,900 ha). Mary Chesnut (the wife of James Chesnut Jr.) wrote a detailed diary of the war years. Her diary, refined and published by her in the 1870s, remains a major historical work of the period, chronicling the rise and fall of the Confederacy.

== See also ==
- List of National Historic Landmarks in South Carolina
- National Register of Historic Places listings in Kershaw County, South Carolina
