= Liberty Hill, South Carolina =

- Unincorporated community
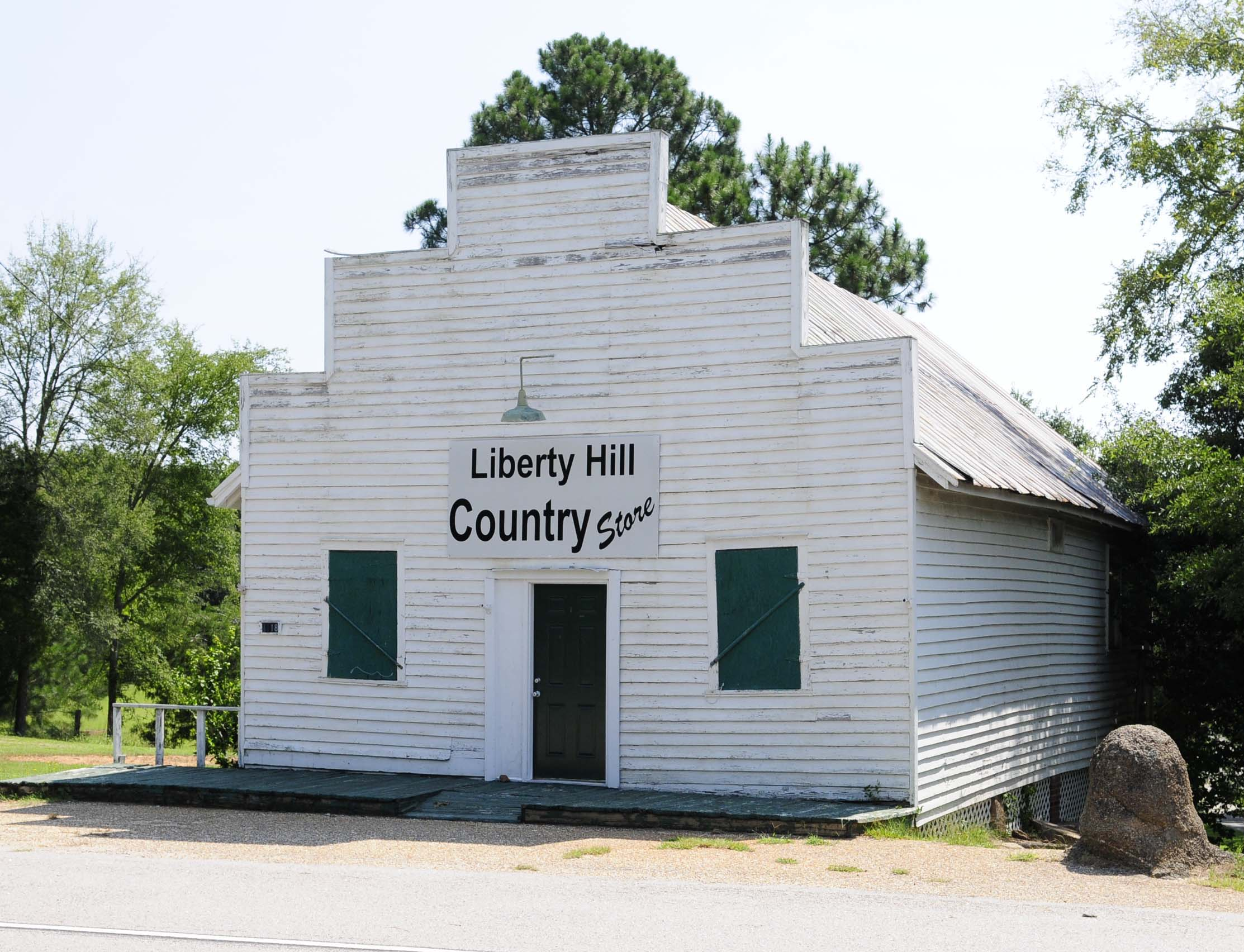
- Liberty Hill Country Store

- Location within South Carolina Location within the United States
- Coordinates: 34°28′42″N 80°48′06″W
- Country: United States
- State: South Carolina
- County: Kershaw
- Elevation: 561 ft (171 m)
- Time zone: UTC-5 (Eastern (EST))
  - Summer (DST): UTC-4 (EDT)
- ZIP code: 29074
- Area codes: 803, 839
- GNIS feature ID: 1246358

Liberty Hill is an unincorporated community in Kershaw County, South Carolina, United States. The community is located at the junction of South Carolina Highway 97 and South Carolina Highway 522, 19.5 miles (31.4 km) northwest of Camden. Liberty Hill has a post office with ZIP code 29074, which opened on January 19, 1818.

Parts of the community are included in the Liberty Hill Historic District, which is listed on the National Register of Historic Places.
