= Russell-Heath House =

Historic house in South Carolina, United States

- U.S. National Register of Historic Places
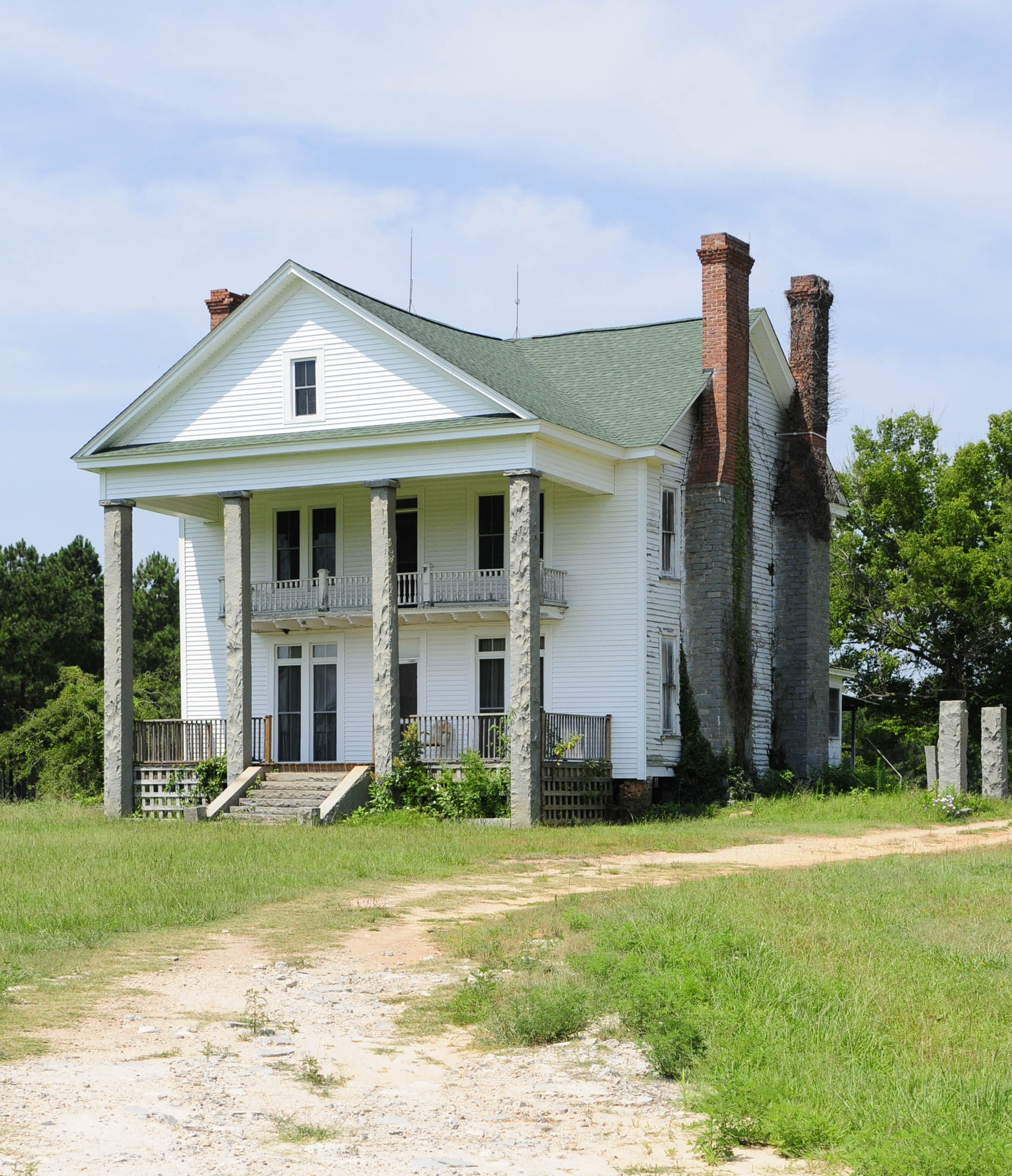
- Russell Heath House, August 2012

- Location within South Carolina Location within the United States
- Location: South Carolina Highway 522, west of its junction with County Road 2088, near Stoneboro, South Carolina
- Coordinates: 34°32′23″N 80°44′25″W
- Area: 3.2 acres (1.3 ha)
- Built: c. 1830, c. 1906
- Architectural style: Classical Revival
- NRHP reference No.: 90000006
- Added to NRHP: February 14, 1990

Russell-Heath House is a historic home located near Stoneboro, Kershaw County, South Carolina. It was built about 1830, and renovated about 1906. The main block is a two-story, rectangular structure with a lateral gable roof and a one-story, gable-roof wing. It has clapboard siding and a brick pier foundation. The façade has a projecting Classical Revival portico with four granite pillars. Also on the property are two contributing early-20th century, vertical plank sheds.

It was listed on the National Register of Historic Places in 1990.
