= List of counties in South Carolina =

Counties of South Carolina
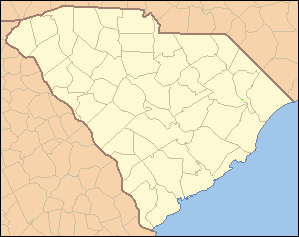
- Location: State of South Carolina
- Number: 46
- Populations: 7,355 (Allendale) – 583,125 (Greenville)
- Areas: 392 square miles (1,020 km^{2}) (Calhoun) – 1,358 square miles (3,520 km^{2}) (Charleston)
- Government: County government
- Subdivisions: Cities, towns, unincorporated communities, census-designated places

The U.S. state of South Carolina is made up of 46 counties, the maximum allowable by state law. They range in size from 392 square miles (1,015 square kilometers) in the case of Calhoun County to 1,358 square miles (3,517 square kilometers) in the case of Charleston County. The least populous county is Allendale County, with only 7,355 residents, while the most populous county is Greenville County, with a population of 583,125, despite the state's most populous city, Charleston, being located in Charleston County.

== History ==
In the colonial period, the land around the coast was divided into parishes corresponding to the parishes of the Church of England. There were also several counties that had judicial and electoral functions. As people settled the backcountry, judicial districts and additional counties were formed. This structure continued and grew after the Revolutionary War. In 1800, all counties were renamed as districts. In 1868, the districts were converted back to counties. The South Carolina Department of Archives and History has maps that show the boundaries of counties, districts, and parishes starting in 1682.

Historically, county government in South Carolina has been fairly weak. The 1895 Constitution made no provision for local government, effectively reducing counties to creatures of the state. Each county's delegation to the General Assembly, comprising one senator and at least one representative, also doubled as its county council. Under this system, the state senator from each county wielded the most power. From the eighteenth century to 1973, counties in South Carolina performed limited functions such as the provision of law enforcement and the construction of transportation infrastructure.

In 1964, the United States Supreme Court case Reynolds v. Sims required reapportionment according to the principle of "one man, one vote", which resulted in legislative districts crossing county lines. However, it was not until 1973 that the constitution was amended to provide for limited home rule at the county level. This was finally enacted in 1975 with the Home Rule Act, which provided for elected councils in each county. Further, in 1989, all counties were given the authority to exercise broad police powers. Thus, they may enact regulations and ordinances related to the provision or preservation of security, health, peace, and order, so long as the regulation is not inconsistent with state law. Nonetheless, all counties and municipalities in South Carolina lack “fiscal home rule,” meaning they may only enact taxes authorized by the General Assembly.

County ordinances become applicable within municipal boundaries when the municipality and the county make a formal agreement, and the municipality formally adopts the ordinance. Unincorporated areas are governed by the county's land use plans.

== Alphabetical list ==
County	FIPS code	County seat	Est.	Origin	Etymology	Abb.	Population (2025)	Area	Map
Abbeville County	001	Abbeville	March 12, 1785	Ninety-Six District	Abbeville, France	AB	24,836	512 sq mi (1,326 km^{2})	State map highlighting Abbeville County
Aiken County	003	Aiken	March 10, 1871	Barnwell County, Edgefield County, Lexington County, and Orangeburg County	William Aiken, founder of the South Carolina Canal and Railroad Company	AK	181,515	1,080 sq mi (2,797 km^{2})	State map highlighting Aiken County
Allendale County	005	Allendale	February 6, 1919	Barnwell County and Hampton County	P.H. Allen, first postmaster of the new county	AL	7,355	412 sq mi (1,067 km^{2})	State map highlighting Allendale County
Anderson County	007	Anderson	December 20, 1826	Pendleton District	Robert Anderson, American Revolutionary War general and Southern surveyor	AN	219,930	756 sq mi (1,958 km^{2})	State map highlighting Anderson County
Bamberg County	009	Bamberg	December 31, 1897	Barnwell County	Francis Marion Bamberg (1838–1905), Confederate general in the American Civil War	BA	12,796	396 sq mi (1,026 km^{2})	State map highlighting Bamberg County
Barnwell County	011	Barnwell	April 16, 1868	Orangeburg County	John Barnwell, South Carolina State Senator and prisoner of war during the American Revolution	BR	20,653	557 sq mi (1,443 km^{2})	State map highlighting Barnwell County
Beaufort County	013	Beaufort	April 16, 1868	1769 Judicial District	Henry Somerset, 1st Duke of Beaufort, colonial proprietary landowner	BU	204,433	923 sq mi (2,391 km^{2})	State map highlighting Beaufort County
Berkeley County	015	Moncks Corner	November 1, 1882	Charleston County	William Berkeley, colonial proprietary governor and landowner	BK	274,666	1,234 sq mi (3,196 km^{2})	State map highlighting Berkeley County
Calhoun County	017	St. Matthews	February 14, 1908	Lexington County and Orangeburg County	John C. Calhoun, U.S. senator from South Carolina	CL	14,188	392 sq mi (1,015 km^{2})	State map highlighting Calhoun County
Charleston County	019	Charleston	April 16, 1868	1769 Judicial District	King Charles II of England	CH	436,200	1,358 sq mi (3,517 km^{2})	State map highlighting Charleston County
Cherokee County	021	Gaffney	February 25, 1897	Spartanburg County, Union County, and York County	Cherokee Native Americans	CK	58,275	397 sq mi (1,028 km^{2})	State map highlighting Cherokee County
Chester County	023	Chester	March 12, 1785	Camden District	Chester, Pennsylvania	CS	33,001	586 sq mi (1,518 km^{2})	State map highlighting Chester County
Chesterfield County	025	Chesterfield	March 12, 1785	Cheraws District	Philip Dormer Stanhope, 4th Earl of Chesterfield, an Enlightenment-era scholar, government official, and member of the British House of Lords	CT	44,740	806 sq mi (2,088 km^{2})	State map highlighting Chesterfield County
Clarendon County	027	Manning	March 12, 1785	Sumter County	Edward Hyde, 1st Earl of Clarendon, colonial proprietary landowner	CR	31,043	696 sq mi (1,803 km^{2})	State map highlighting Clarendon County
Colleton County	029	Walterboro	April 16, 1868	Charleston County	John Colleton, colonial proprietary landowner	CN	39,382	1,133 sq mi (2,934 km^{2})	State map highlighting Colleton County
Darlington County	031	Darlington	March 12, 1785	Cheraws District	Unknown; possibly Darlington, England	DA	62,888	566 sq mi (1,466 km^{2})	State map highlighting Darlington County
Dillon County	033	Dillon	February 5, 1910	Marion County	James William "J.W." Dillon (1826–1913), founder of the Wilson Short Cut Railroad	DN	27,458	407 sq mi (1,054 km^{2})	State map highlighting Dillon County
Dorchester County	035	St. George	February 25, 1897	Berkeley County and Colleton County	Dorchester, Massachusetts	DR	178,397	571 sq mi (1,479 km^{2})	State map highlighting Dorchester County
Edgefield County	037	Edgefield	March 12, 1785	Ninety-Six District	Disputed; either its location on the edge of the state or Edgefield, Norfolk, England	ED	29,808	507 sq mi (1,313 km^{2})	State map highlighting Edgefield County
Fairfield County	039	Winnsboro	March 12, 1785	Camden District	The county's fair fields, as described by colonial Governor Charles Cornwallis	FA	20,340	710 sq mi (1,839 km^{2})	State map highlighting Fairfield County
Florence County	041	Florence	December 22, 1888	Clarendon County, Darlington County, Marion County, and Williamsburg County	Florence Harllee (1848–1927), daughter of Wilmington and Manchester Railroad founder W.W. Harllee	FL	138,504	804 sq mi (2,082 km^{2})	State map highlighting Florence County
Georgetown County	043	Georgetown	April 16, 1868	1769 Judicial District	George III of the United Kingdom	GE	65,912	1,035 sq mi (2,681 km^{2})	State map highlighting Georgetown County
Greenville County	045	Greenville	March 22, 1786	Washington District	Nathanael Greene, Revolutionary War general	GVL	583,125	796 sq mi (2,062 km^{2})	State map highlighting Greenville County
Greenwood County	047	Greenwood	March 2, 1897	Abbeville County and Edgefield County	Greenwood Plantation, the home of John McGee, the county's largest landowner	GN	70,379	464 sq mi (1,202 km^{2})	State map highlighting Greenwood County
Hampton County	049	Hampton	February 18, 1878	Beaufort County	Wade Hampton III, lieutenant general and cavalry leader in the Confederate States Army and later governor of South Carolina and U.S. senator	HA	18,174	563 sq mi (1,458 km^{2})	State map highlighting Hampton County
Horry County	051	Conway	April 16, 1868	Georgetown County	Peter Horry, Revolutionary War general	HR	427,551	1,255 sq mi (3,250 km^{2})	State map highlighting Horry County
Jasper County	053	Ridgeland	January 30, 1912	Beaufort County and Hampton County	William Jasper, Revolutionary War sergeant	JA	38,533	702 sq mi (1,818 km^{2})	State map highlighting Jasper County
Kershaw County	055	Camden	February 19, 1791	Claremont County, Fairfield County, Lancaster County, and Richland	Joseph Kershaw, one of the county's pioneering settlers	KE	73,166	740 sq mi (1,917 km^{2})	State map highlighting Kershaw County
Lancaster County	057	Lancaster	March 12, 1785	Camden District	Lancaster, England, and the House of Lancaster	LA	114,296	555 sq mi (1,437 km^{2})	State map highlighting Lancaster County
Laurens County	059	Laurens	March 12, 1785	Ninety-Six District	Henry Laurens, president of the Second Continental Congress and prisoner of war during the American Revolution	LU	71,848	724 sq mi (1,875 km^{2})	State map highlighting Laurens County
Lee County	061	Bishopville	February 19, 1898	Darlington County, Kershaw County, and Sumter County	Robert E. Lee, Confederate general during the Civil War	LE	15,730	411 sq mi (1,064 km^{2})	State map highlighting Lee County
Lexington County	063	Lexington	March 12, 1785	Orangeburg County	Battle of Lexington, opening skirmish of the Revolutionary War	LX	317,588	758 sq mi (1,963 km^{2})	State map highlighting Lexington County
Marion County	067	Marion	April 16, 1868	Georgetown County	Francis Marion, Revolutionary War general	MA	28,242	494 sq mi (1,279 km^{2})	State map highlighting Marion County
Marlboro County	069	Bennettsville	March 12, 1785	Cheraws District	John Churchill, 1st Duke of Marlborough, English general, diplomat, and confidant of monarchs	ML	25,488	486 sq mi (1,259 km^{2})	State map highlighting Marlboro County
McCormick County	065	McCormick	April 12, 1916	Abbeville County, Edgefield County, and Greenwood County	Cyrus McCormick, inventor of the mechanical reaper and founder of International Harvester	MC	10,215	394 sq mi (1,020 km^{2})	State map highlighting McCormick County
Newberry County	071	Newberry	March 12, 1785	Ninety-Six District	Disputed; possibly Newbury, Berkshire, England, or from early settlers' notion that the landscape was as "pretty as a new berry"	NB	39,561	647 sq mi (1,676 km^{2})	State map highlighting Newberry County
Oconee County	073	Walhalla	January 29, 1868	Pickens County	Oconee Native Americans	OC	83,775	674 sq mi (1,746 km^{2})	State map highlighting Oconee County
Orangeburg County	075	Orangeburg	April 16, 1868	1769 Judicial District	Prince William V of Orange	OR	83,177	1,128 sq mi (2,922 km^{2})	State map highlighting Orangeburg County
Pickens County	077	Pickens	December 20, 1826	Pendleton District	Andrew Pickens, governor of South Carolina	PN	139,198	513 sq mi (1,329 km^{2})	State map highlighting Pickens County
Richland County	079	Columbia	March 12, 1785	Camden District	The county's rich soil	RD	434,956	772 sq mi (1,999 km^{2})	State map highlighting Richland County
Saluda County	081	Saluda	February 25, 1896	Edgefield County	Saluda River	SA	19,680	462 sq mi (1,197 km^{2})	State map highlighting Saluda County
Spartanburg County	083	Spartanburg	March 12, 1785	Ninety-Six District	"Spartan Regiment" of the state militia, which was the key force for victory in the Revolutionary War Battle of Cowpens	SP	380,857	820 sq mi (2,124 km^{2})	State map highlighting Spartanburg County
Sumter County	085	Sumter	April 16, 1868	Claremont County, Clarendon County, and Salem County	Thomas Sumter, Revolutionary War general and U.S. senator from South Carolina	SU	105,067	682 sq mi (1,766 km^{2})	State map highlighting Sumter County
Union County	087	Union	March 12, 1785	Ninety-Six District	Union Church, the first Christian place of worship in the area	UN	26,799	515 sq mi (1,334 km^{2})	State map highlighting Union County
Williamsburg County	089	Kingstree	April 16, 1868	Georgetown District	King William III of England	WG	29,662	937 sq mi (2,427 km^{2})	State map highlighting Williamsburg County
York County	091	York	March 12, 1785	Camden District	York County, Pennsylvania	YK	306,887	696 sq mi (1,803 km^{2})	State map highlighting York County

== Racial / Ethnic Profile of counties in South Carolina (2020 Census) ==
Racial / Ethnic Profile of counties in South Carolina (2020 Census)
Following is a table of counties in South Carolina by race/ethnicity. The majority racial/ethnic group is coded per the key below.

Majority minority with no dominant group
Majority White
Majority Black
Majority Hispanic
Majority Asian
Majority Native American

Racial and ethnic composition of counties in South Carolina (2020 Census) (NH = Non-Hispanic) Note: the US Census treats Hispanic/Latino as an ethnic category. This table excludes Latinos from the racial categories and assigns them to a separate category. Hispanics/Latinos may be of any race.
County	Location of County	Total Population	White alone (NH)	%	Black or African American alone (NH)	%	Native American or Alaska Native alone (NH)	%	Asian alone (NH)	%	Pacific Islander alone (NH)	%	Other race alone (NH)	%	Mixed race or Multiracial (NH)	%	Hispanic or Latino (any race)	%
Abbeville		24,295	16,744	68.92%	6,184	25.45%	44	0.18%	71	0.29%	7	0.03%	70	0.29%	752	3.10%	423	1.74%
Aiken		168,808	107,918	63.93%	39,465	23.38%	530	0.31%	1,773	1.05%	96	0.06%	669	0.40%	6,831	4.05%	11,526	6.83%
Allendale		8,039	1,985	24.69%	5,646	70.23%	45	0.56%	17	0.21%	1	0.01%	13	0.16%	138	1.72%	194	2.41%
Anderson		203,718	152,396	74.81%	30,214	14.83%	425	0.21%	2,404	1.18%	46	0.02%	698	0.34%	7,961	3.91%	9,574	4.70%
Bamberg		13,311	5,010	37.64%	7,749	58.22%	25	0.19%	66	0.50%	0	0.00%	36	0.27%	284	2.13%	141	1.06%
Barnwell		20,589	10,352	50.28%	8,802	42.75%	61	0.30%	161	0.78%	14	0.07%	58	0.28%	638	3.10%	520	2.53%
Beaufort		187,117	126,704	67.71%	27,545	14.72%	354	0.19%	2,381	1.27%	119	0.06%	675	0.36%	5,928	3.17%	23,411	12.51%
Berkeley		229,861	137,840	59.97%	51,784	22.53%	354	0.45%	5,353	2.33%	173	0.08%	1,720	0.75%	11,628	5.06%	20,328	8.84%
Calhoun		14,119	7,783	55.12%	5,361	37.97%	62	0.44%	27	0.19%	6	0.04%	30	0.21%	363	2.57%	487	3.45%
Charleston		408,235	263,560	64.56%	91,746	22.47%	857	0.21%	7,461	1.83%	319	0.08%	1,533	0.38%	13,479	3.30%	29,280	7.17%
Cherokee		56,216	39,576	70.40%	11,292	20.09%	161	0.29%	341	0.61%	14	0.02%	195	0.35%	1,860	3.31%	2,777	4.94%
Chester		32,294	18,591	57.57%	11,287	34.95%	145	0.45%	146	0.45%	14	0.04%	133	0.41%	1,183	3.66%	795	2.46%
Chesterfield		43,273	25,829	59.69%	13,150	30.39%	184	0.43%	269	0.62%	4	0.01%	118	0.27%	1,633	3.77%	2,086	4.82%
Clarendon		31,144	15,309	49.16%	13,821	44.38%	120	0.39%	225	0.72%	8	0.03%	73	0.23%	681	2.19%	907	2.91%
Colleton		38,604	21,816	56.51%	13,401	34.71%	302	0.78%	186	0.48%	16	0.04%	101	0.26%	1,402	3.63%	1,380	3.57%
Darlington		62,905	33,821	53.77%	25,386	40.36%	136	0.22%	290	0.46%	4	0.01%	128	0.20%	1,744	2.77%	1,396	2.22%
Dillon		28,292	12,987	45.90%	12,709	44.92%	603	2.13%	63	0.22%	1	0.00%	75	0.27%	998	3.53%	856	3.03%
Dorchester		161,540	99,145	61.37%	38,278	23.70%	886	0.55%	3,286	2.03%	199	0.12%	793	0.49%	8,092	5.01%	10,861	6.72%
Edgefield		25,657	14,890	58.03%	8,301	32.35%	67	0.26%	118	0.46%	6	0.02%	93	0.36%	811	3.16%	1,371	5.34%
Fairfield		20,948	8,503	40.59%	11,201	53.47%	64	0.31%	101	0.48%	7	0.03%	55	0.26%	594	2.84%	423	2.02%
Florence		137,059	69,021	50.36%	56,877	41.50%	330	0.24%	2,309	1.68%	48	0.04%	364	0.27%	3,827	2.79%	4,283	3.12%
Georgetown		63,404	41,186	64.96%	18,051	28.47%	111	0.18%	258	0.41%	27	0.04%	130	0.21%	1,416	2.23%	2,225	3.51%
Greenville		525,534	343,897	65.44%	87,124	16.58%	893	0.17%	12,875	2.45%	398	0.08%	2,345	0.45%	19,977	3.80%	58,025	11.04%
Greenwood		69,351	40,625	58.58%	20,820	30.02%	102	0.15%	678	0.98%	41	0.06%	185	0.27%	2,151	3.10%	4,749	6.85%
Hampton		18,561	7,802	42.03%	9,536	51.38%	41	0.22%	100	0.54%	17	0.09%	40	0.22%	359	1.93%	666	3.59%
Horry		351,029	265,729	75.70%	39,367	11.21%	1,174	0.33%	4,578	1.30%	303	0.09%	1,422	0.41%	14,152	4.03%	24,304	6.92%
Jasper		28,791	13,056	45.35%	9,559	33.20%	59	0.20%	187	0.65%	23	0.08%	108	0.38%	720	2.50%	5,079	17.64%
Kershaw		65,403	43,391	66.34%	15,083	23.06%	146	0.22%	417	0.64%	29	0.04%	239	0.37%	2,632	4.02%	3,466	5.30%
Lancaster		96,016	64,927	67.62%	19,101	19.89%	220	0.23%	1,765	1.84%	14	0.01%	337	0.35%	3,358	3.50%	6,294	6.56%
Laurens		67,539	44,358	65.68%	15,937	23.60%	144	0.21%	295	0.44%	24	0.04%	238	0.35%	2,396	3.55%	4,147	6.14%
Lee		16,531	5,721	34.61%	10,054	60.82%	49	0.30%	34	0.21%	0	0.00%	15	0.09%	363	2.20%	295	1.78%
Lexington		293,991	208,854	71.04%	42,382	14.42%	894	0.30%	6,644	2.26%	185	0.06%	1,089	0.37%	12,146	4.13%	21,797	7.41%
McCormick		9,526	5,155	54.12%	3,916	41.11%	27	0.28%	36	0.38%	2	0.02%	32	0.34%	235	2.47%	123	1.29%
Marion		29,183	11,080	37.97%	16,333	55.97%	109	0.37%	128	0.44%	0	0.00%	42	0.14%	781	2.68%	710	2.43%
Marlboro		26,667	10,556	39.58%	13,302	49.88%	1,130	4.24%	99	0.37%	7	0.03%	39	0.15%	959	3.60%	575	2.16%
Newberry		37,719	22,635	60.01%	10,360	27.47%	107	0.28%	135	0.36%	4	0.01%	72	0.19%	1,101	2.92%	3,305	8.76%
Oconee		78,607	64,696	82.30%	5,119	6.51%	176	0.22%	591	0.75%	16	0.02%	182	0.23%	3,443	4.38%	4,384	5.58%
Orangeburg		84,223	27,787	32.99%	50,802	60.32%	467	0.55%	892	1.06%	37	0.04%	200	0.24%	2,071	2.46%	1,967	2.34%
Pickens		131,404	107,247	81.62%	8,421	6.41%	304	0.23%	2,723	2.07%	37	0.03%	426	0.32%	5,674	4.32%	6,572	5.00%
Richland		416,147	172,644	41.49%	188,141	45.21%	888	0.21%	11,330	2.72%	427	0.10%	1,872	0.45%	14,750	3.54%	26,095	6.27%
Saluda		18,862	11,264	59.72%	4,028	21.36%	44	0.23%	35	0.19%	0	0.00%	38	0.20%	441	2.34%	3,012	15.97%
Spartanburg		327,997	214,440	65.38%	63,565	19.38%	699	0.21%	8,176	2.49%	190	0.06%	1,102	0.34%	12,093	3.69%	27,732	8.45%
Sumter		105,556	46,442	44.00%	48,536	45.98%	338	0.32%	1,400	1.33%	87	0.08%	316	0.30%	4,135	3.92%	4,302	4.08%
Union		27,244	17,279	63.42%	8,435	30.96%	56	0.21%	78	0.29%	3	0.01%	49	0.18%	906	3.33%	438	1.61%
Williamsburg		31,026	9,986	32.19%	19,579	63.11%	85	0.27%	147	0.47%	1	0.00%	61	0.20%	548	1.77%	619	2.00%
York		282,090	188,015	66.65%	51,298	18.18%	1,892	0.67%	8,745	3.10%	111	0.04%	1,145	0.41%	11,946	4.23%	18,938	6.71%

== Defunct parishes, counties and districts ==
=== Parishes ===
Until the late 19th century, the South Carolina Lowcountry was divided into parishes, grouped into several "districts"; these civil parishes were based on and generally coincident (even well after disestablishment) with Anglican ecclesiastical parishes.

- Beaufort District
  - St. Helena's Parish
  - St. Luke's Parish, created on May 23, 1767; located on Hilton Head Island and the adjacent mainland
  - St. Peter's Parish
  - Prince William Parish
- Charleston District
  - St. Andrew's Parish
  - St. Bartholomew's Parish
  - St. John's Colleton Parish
  - St. George's Dorchester Parish
  - St. Philip's & St. Michael's Parish
  - Christchurch Parish
  - St. James' Goose Creek Parish
  - St. Thomas' & St. Denis' Parish
  - St. John's Berkeley Parish
  - St. Stephen's Parish
  - St. James' Santee Parish
  - St. Paul's Parish
- Georgetown District
  - All Saints' Parish
  - Prince George, Winyah, Parish
  - Prince Frederick Parish
- Cheraw District
  - St. David's Parish
  - St. Mark's Parish
- Orangeburgh District
  - St. Matthew's Parish

=== Counties ===
- Carteret County
- Craven County
- Granville County
- Orange County
- Lewisburg County (1785–1791)
- Winton County, present-day Barnwell County
- Liberty County, present-day Marion County
- Winyah County, former name of Georgetown County
- Claremont County
- Salem County

=== Districts ===
- Cheraw District, created in 1769
- Camden District, created in 1769
- Ninety-Six District, created in 1769
- Pinckney District (1791–1798)
- Washington District (1785–1798)
- Pendleton District, created in 1789 from Cherokee lands

== Proposed counties ==
- Birch County, proposed in 2013 (portions of Lexington and Richland counties)

== See also ==
- List of municipalities in South Carolina
- List of census-designated places in South Carolina
- List of ghost towns in South Carolina
- List of former United States counties

== Works cited ==
- Landrum, John Belton O'Neall (1897) Colonial and revolutionary history of upper South Carolina: embracing for the most part the primitive and colonial history of the territory comprising the original county of Spartanburg with a general review of the entire military operations in the upper portion of South Carolina and portions of North Carolina Shannon and Company, Greenville, South Carolina, OCLC 3492548
