= Boykin, Kershaw County, South Carolina =

Boykin, South Carolina
- Census-designated place
- Location within South Carolina Location within the United States
- Coordinates: 34°07′28″N 80°35′18″W
- Country: United States
- State: South Carolina
- County: Kershaw

Area
  - Total: 7.069 sq mi (18.31 km^{2})
  - Land: 6.881 sq mi (17.82 km^{2})
  - Water: 0.188 sq mi (0.49 km^{2})
- Elevation: 141 ft (43 m)

Population (2010)
  - Total: 100
  - Density: 15/sq mi (5.6/km^{2})
- Time zone: UTC-5 (Eastern (EST))
  - Summer (DST): UTC-4 (EDT)
- Area codes: 803, 839
- GNIS feature ID: 2629819

Boykin is a census-designated place and unincorporated community in Kershaw County, South Carolina, United States. Its population was 100 as of the 2010 census. Boykin is located on South Carolina Highway 261, 9 miles (14 km) south of Camden. It is named for John Boykin, an early resident.

== History ==
On May 5, 1860, at least two dozen individuals drowned in the Boykin Mill Pond when a flatboat they were enjoying an excursion on sank after it struck a stump, began taking on water and those onboard panicked and moved toward one end of the boat. It tipped, dumping the more than 50 people on the flatboat into the water.

The Battle of Boykin's Mill was fought in Boykin on April 18, 1865. It marked the last battle of the American Civil War fought in South Carolina and was the site of the last Union officer killed in action during the conflict. Boykin's Mill was added to the National Register of Historic Places in 1992.

Midfield Plantation was listed on the National Register of Historic Places in 1978.

== Arts and culture ==
South Carolina's state dog, the Boykin Spaniel, was originally bred in Boykin in the 1900s, after Whittaker "Whit" Boykin experimented with crossbreeding, for which the dog is named after him. September 1 is Boykin Spaniel Day in South Carolina.

Every December, the Boykin Christmas Parade takes place downtown.
