= Midfield Plantation =

Historic house in South Carolina, United States

- U.S. National Register of Historic Places
- Location within South Carolina Location within the United States
- Location: Northeast of Boykin on South Carolina Highway 23, near Boykin, South Carolina
- Coordinates: 34°7′40″N 80°33′28″W
- Area: 5 acres (2.0 ha)
- Built: c. 1821, c. 1900
- NRHP reference No.: 78002518
- Added to NRHP: April 20, 1978

Midfield Plantation, also known as Ellerbe House and Boineau House, was a historic plantation house located near Boykin, Kershaw County, South Carolina. It was built about 1821, and was a two-story, hip roofed, frame dwelling on a high masonry basement. It had rear additions added about 1900. The original kitchen and smokehouse are still on the property as remains.

It was listed on the National Register of Historic Places in 1978. It has since been demolished.
