= Cantey, South Carolina =

Settlement in South Carolina, United States

Coordinates: 34°20′41″N 80°40′42″W

Cantey is an unincorporated community in Kershaw County, in the U.S. state of South Carolina.

== History ==
The community was named after the local Cantey family, early settlers. A variant name is "Cantey Hill". A post office called Cantey was established in 1884, and remained in operation until 1921.
