= Liberty Hill Historic District (Liberty Hill, South Carolina) =

Historic district in South Carolina, United States

- U.S. National Register of Historic Places
- U.S. Historic district
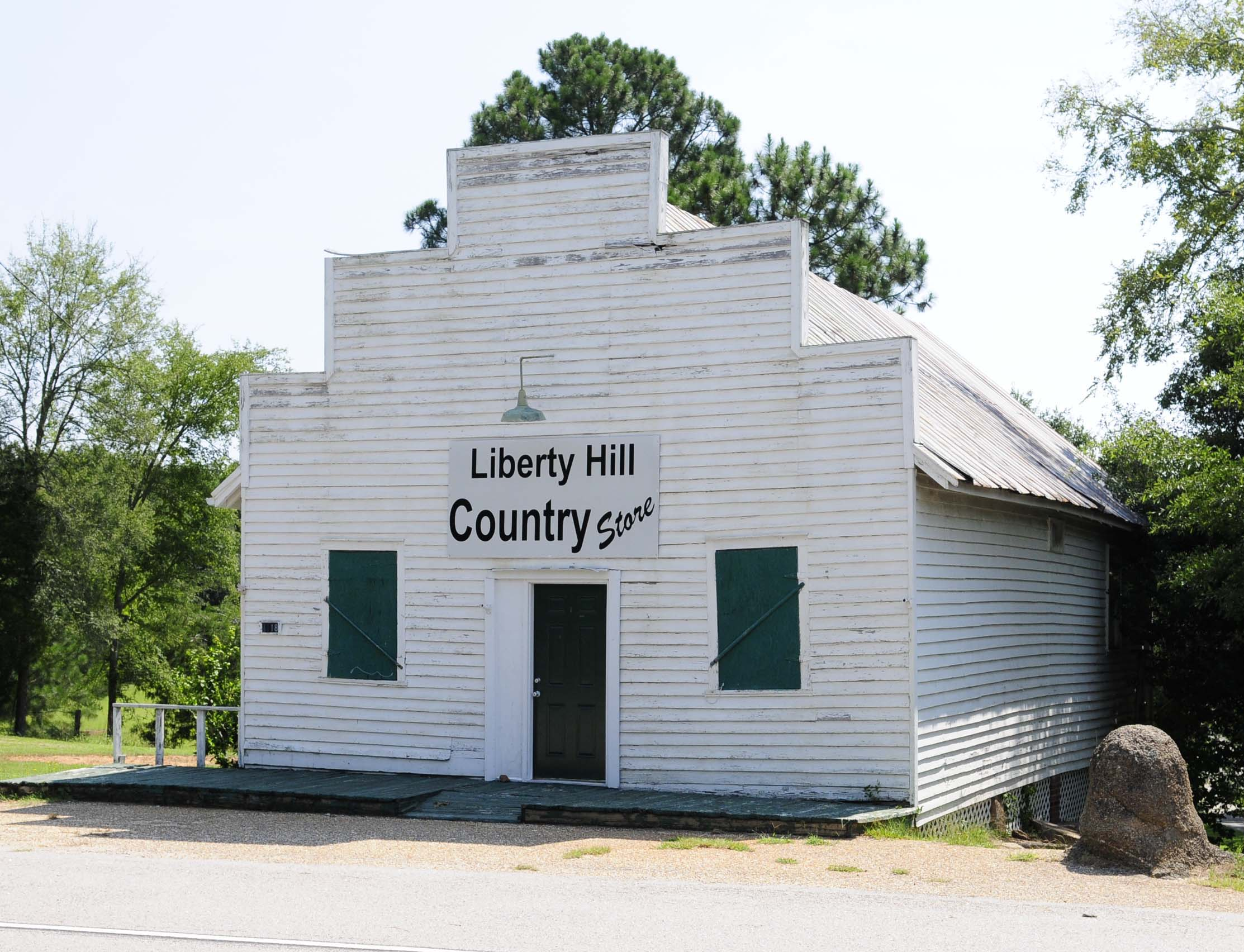
- Liberty Hill Historic District, August 2012

- Location within South Carolina Location within the United States
- Location: SC 97, Liberty Hill, South Carolina
- Coordinates: 34°28′18″N 80°48′13″W
- Area: 434 acres (176 ha)
- Built: c. 1850
- Architectural style: Greek Revival, Gothic Revival
- NRHP reference No.: 78002519
- Added to NRHP: November 14, 1978

Liberty Hill Historic District is a national historic district located at Liberty Hill, Kershaw County, South Carolina. The district encompasses 34 contributing buildings and 2 contributing structures in the small rural community of Liberty Hill. The district includes several imposing Greek Revival structures, Greek Revival cottages, and an 1880s vernacular Gothic Revival church. The later, turn of the 20th century residences are primarily one-story, simple clapboard cottages. The town's history begins as early as ca. 1813 when Peter Garlick's store (location unknown) was a gathering place for surrounding farmers. Soon, impressive structures were built by planters in the area. Remaining from the 1830s are Cool Spring and the Joseph Cunningham House. The majority of the town's antebellum buildings, however, were built ca. 1840–1850. During this period Liberty Hill was a very wealthy community. However, the final days of the American Civil War ended that prosperity. Nevertheless, the town did eventually reassert itself and appears to have changed very little since the beginning of the 20th century.

It was listed on the National Register of Historic Places in 1978.
