= The Witch of Saratoga =

Character from New York folklore

Angeline Tubbs
Creature information
- Grouping: Ghosts
- Similar entities: Agnes of Glasgow
- Folklore: New York

Origin
- First attested: 1770s
- Country: United States
- Region: Saratoga Springs, New York
- Details: Spurned or murdered lover abandoned in America by British soldier

Angeline Tubbs, also known as The Witch of Saratoga (1761 - 1865) was a semi-legendary figure who lived in the area of Saratoga Springs, New York in the 18th and 19th centuries.

== Background ==
Tubbs was born in England around 1761, in the Star and Garter Inn in the village of Watford in Northamptonshire. She became engaged to a British officer from the 31st (Huntingdonshire) Regiment of Foot and at age fifteen followed him when he was sent to the colonies to fight in the Revolutionary War. After the British defeat in the Battles of Saratoga (September- October, 1777), he abandoned her. With no place to go and knowing no one in a strange country, Tubbs supposedly walked 15 mi (24 km) through what was then uninhabited wilderness to the neighborhood of Saratoga Springs. There she settled at the base of a hill called Mount Vista, described as "a small mountain one mile north of the village", probably a promontory in the vicinity of Glen Mitchell—

Just north of the village of Saratoga Springs rises a bald promontory of rock - called "Mount Vista" - the gray masses of which impend frowningly over a deep glen beneath.

For many years Tubbs lived there in a hut surrounded by a brood of cats. She developed a reputation as a witch and made a living telling fortunes and trapping. Stone provides the following description:

Had she been mistress of the whirlwind, she could not have been more delighted with storms. She had been seen, her form erect and with extended arms, standing upon the verge of fearful precipices, in the midst of the most awful tempests, conversing, as it were, with unseen spirits, her long, matted hair streaming in the wind, while the thunder was riving the rocks beneath her feet, and the red lightning encircling her as with a winding-sheet of flame.

== Death and legacy ==
Tubbs died in 1865 at the age of 104. Reportedly her ghost can still be seen haunting the woods and she is a popular subject for "ghost walks".
