= Zachariah Cantey House =

Historic house in South Carolina, United States

- U.S. National Register of Historic Places
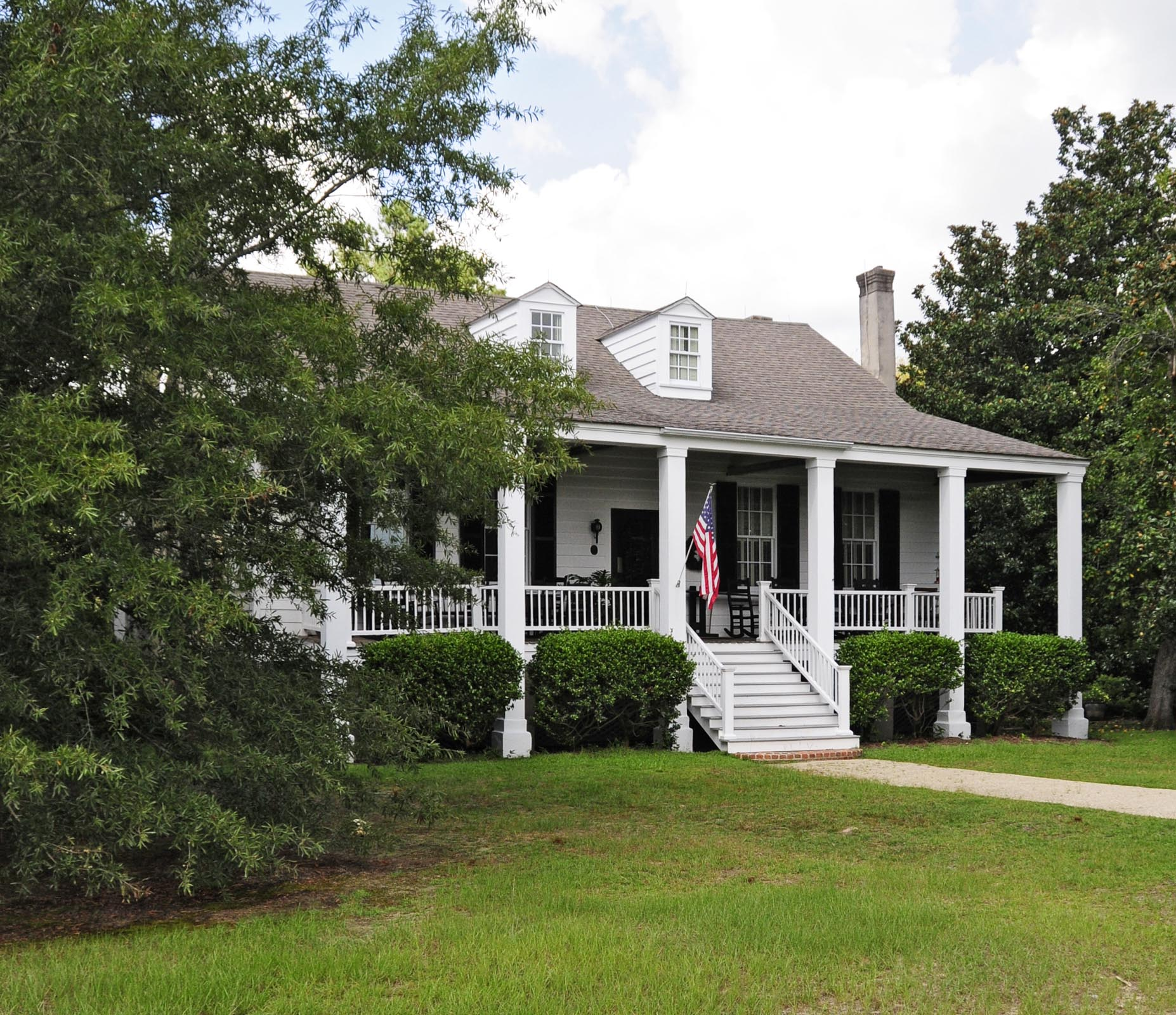
- Zachariah Cantey House, September 2012

- Location within South Carolina Location within the United States
- Location: County Road 92, near Camden, South Carolina
- Coordinates: 34°10′10″N 80°32′56″W
- Area: 2.6 acres (1.1 ha)
- Built: c. 1795
- Architectural style: Federal
- NRHP reference No.: 83002199
- Added to NRHP: May 19, 1983

Zachariah Cantey House, also known as Buckton, is a historic home located near Camden, Kershaw County, South Carolina. It was built about 1795, and is a rectangular, 1 1/2-story Federal hall and parlor dwelling. It has a hewn-timber braced frame; beaded weatherboard siding; a tall, brick pier foundation and a gable roof. Zachariah Cantey was a prominent local planter, businessman, and politician.

It was listed on the National Register of Historic Places in 1983.
