= City of Camden Historic District =

Historic district in South Carolina, United States

- U.S. National Register of Historic Places
- U.S. Historic district
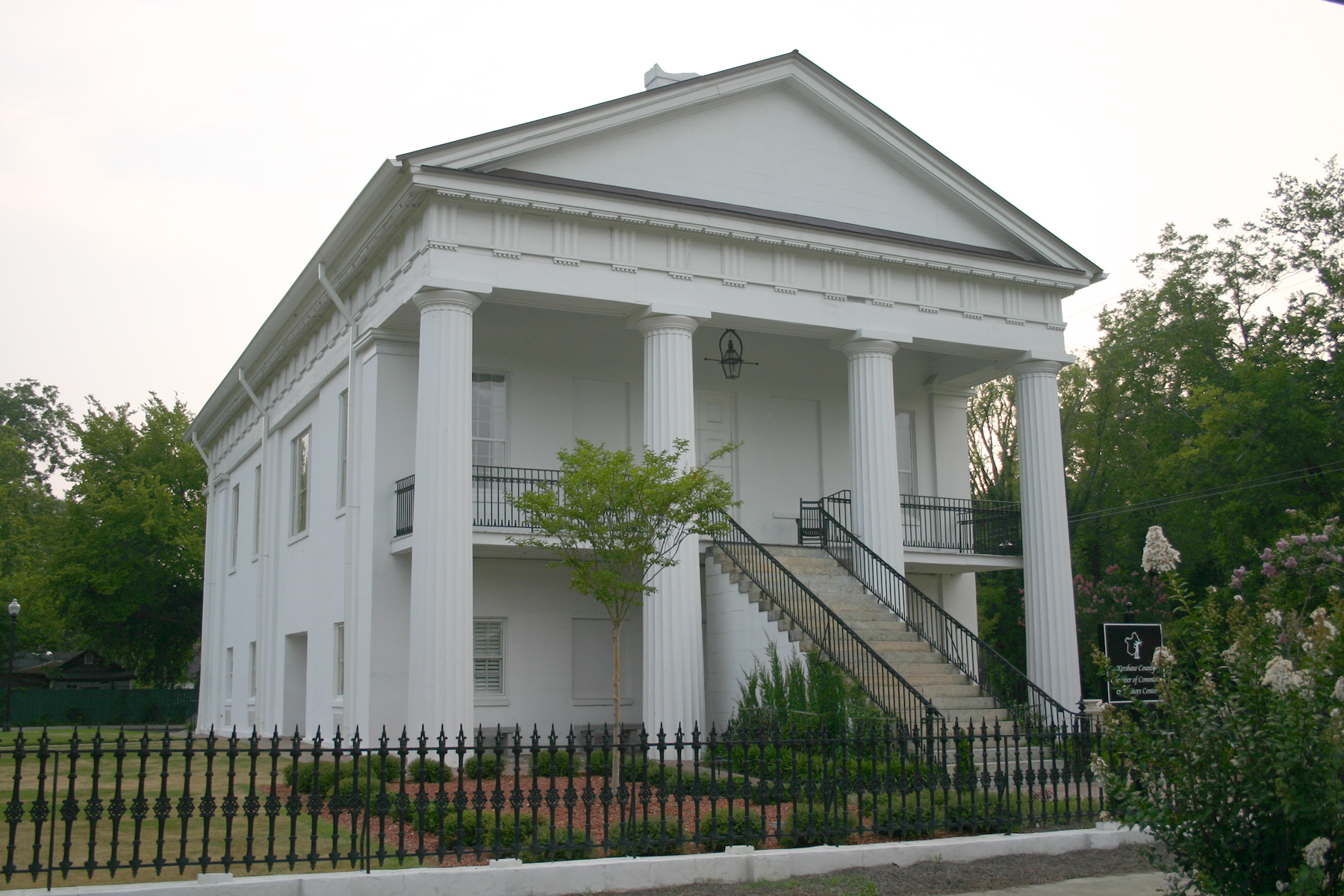
- Kershaw County Courthouse, November 2004

- Location within South Carolina Location within the United States
- Location: Bounded on S by city limits, on E and W by Southern RR. right-of-way, and on N by Dicey Creek Rd., Camden, South Carolina
- Coordinates: 34°15′16″N 80°36′21″W
- Area: 1,794 acres (726 ha)
- Built: 1813
- Architect: Robert Mills
- Architectural style: Greek Revival, Georgian, Raised cottage
- NRHP reference No.: 71000787
- Added to NRHP: May 6, 1971

City of Camden Historic District is a national historic district located at Camden, Kershaw County, South Carolina. The district encompasses 48 contributing buildings, 8 contributing sites, 2 contributing structures, and 3 contributing objects in Camden. The district is mostly residential but also include public buildings, a church, and a cemetery. Camden's architecture is classically inspired and includes examples of Federal, Greek Revival, and Classical Revival, in addition to cottage-type, Georgian, Charleston-type with modifications, and mansion-type houses. Several of the city's buildings were designed by architect Robert Mills. Notable buildings include the Kershaw County Courthouse (1826), U.S. Post Office, Camden Opera House and Clock Tower, Camden Powder Magazine, Trinity United Methodist Church, St. Mary's Catholic Church, Gov. Fletcher House, Greenleaf Villa (Samuel Flake House), The First National Bank of Camden, and the separately listed Bethesda Presbyterian Church and Kendall Mill.

It was listed on the National Register of Historic Places in 1971.
