= Cool Springs (Missouri) =

Spring in Missouri, U.S.

Coordinates: 40.0236111°N 91.6816667°W

Cool Springs is a spring in Lewis County in the U.S. state of Missouri.

Cool Springs was named on account of the temperature of its water.

== See also ==
- List of rivers of Missouri
