= Pendleton District, South Carolina =

Coordinates: 34.59°N 82.77°W

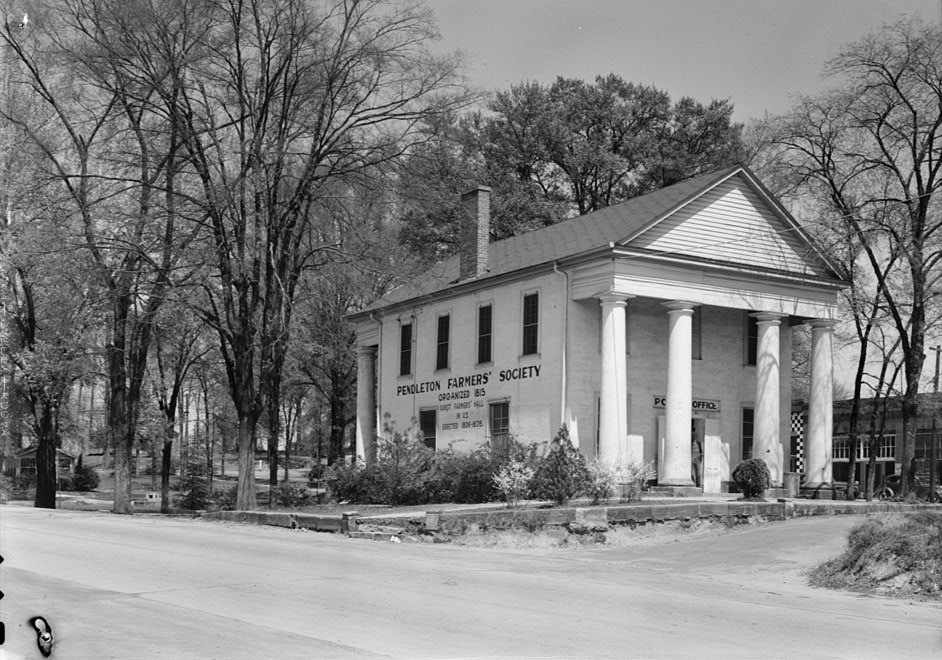
Farmers' Hall, whose construction was begun for the second Pendleton District court house.

Pendleton District, named after US Judge Henry Pendleton, is a former judicial district in South Carolina. It existed as a county or a district from 7 March 1789 to 20 December 1826.

In the colonial period, the land around the coast was divided into parishes corresponding to the parishes of the Church of England. There were also several counties that had judicial and electoral functions. As people settled the backcountry, judicial districts and additional counties were formed. This structure continued and grew after the Revolutionary War. In 1800, all counties were renamed as districts. In 1868, the districts were converted back to counties. The South Carolina Department of Archives and History has maps that show the boundaries of counties, districts, and parishes starting in 1682.

Pendleton County was created on 7 March 1789 in the former Indian lands. It included the current Anderson and Pickens counties and all but about 70 square miles (180 km^{2}) along the Chattooga River of Oconee County. The land along the Chattooga belonged the Cherokee and Creek peoples. Pendleton County was attached to Abbeville.

On 19 February 1791, Pendleton County became part of the new Washington District, which also included most of Greenville County. On 1 January 1800, Washington District was disbanded. Pendleton County and Greenville County were renamed as districts.

On 19 December 1816, Pendleton District gained the Indian lands along the Chattooga. Finally, on 20 December 1826, the Pendleton District was abolished and replaced by Anderson and Pickens Districts. Pickens District incorporated both the current Pickens and Oconee Counties.

The court house and jail for Pendleton District were in Pendleton, South Carolina. At the time of the dissolution of the district, its second court house was under construction. This was completed by the Pendleton Farmers' Society. It is still standing in on the Pendleton Square and is part of the Pendleton Historic District.
