= Meyers Mill, South Carolina =

Coordinates: 33°10′01″N 81°36′03″W

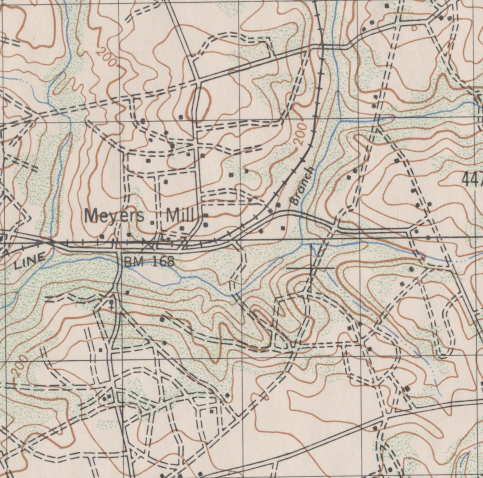
Meyers Mill SC 1949 Topographic Map

Meyers Mill was an unincorporated community in southwestern Barnwell County, South Carolina, United States. The area was originally settled by the Meyer family in the late 19th century. Meyers Mill grew after a train stop was built on a new rail line. In 1951, it was acquired by the U.S. Atomic Energy Commission as part of a site for the Savannah River Plant.

== History ==
=== Early history ===
The settlement of the community grew with the construction of the Atlantic Coast Line around 1900 from Denmark, South Carolina, to Robins, South Carolina. Robins was on the railroad from Port Royal to Augusta, Georgia. Robins was also taken for the Savannah River Plant. This line is now part of CSX Transportation.

The Meyers Mill community is named after the Meyer family. It was an agricultural community. In the early 1940s, a fire destroyed about half of the community. By the early 1950s, Meyers Mill had a population of about 50, about ten residences, three commercial buildings, one church, one cotton gin, and the railroad station. The people were largely African-Americans.

=== Exodus ===
On November 28, 1950, the U.S. Atomic Energy Commission and the E. I. du Pont de Nemours Company announced that the Savannah River Plant would be built on about 300 sq. mi. of Aiken County, Barnwell County, and Allendale County in South Carolina. The Savannah River Plant was built for the production of plutonium and tritium for the H-bomb.

About 6,000 people and 6,000 graves were to be relocated. This include the incorporated communities of Dunbarton and Ellenton and the unincorporated communities of Meyers Mill, Hawthorne, Robbins, and Leigh. A significant fraction of those removed were African-American farmers and sharecroppers.

The government purchased or condemned the property. Many of the residents moved themselves, and in some cases, their homes.

== Geography ==
Meyers Mill's location was approximately 33.17062 N, 81.597963 W per 1944 GEO-Locate.org overlay map. Meyers Mill's location was approximately 33°10'06" N and 81°35'48" W. It was located north of Meyers Branch at the intersection of the current SRS "9" and the CSX rail line.

== Legacy ==
An annual reunion of former Meyers Mill residents started in 1952, but it is no longer held. In addition, there have been reunions of Four Mile High School, which was the African-American high school east of Dunbarton.
