= Bethesda Presbyterian Church (Camden, South Carolina) =

Historic church in South Carolina, United States

- U.S. National Register of Historic Places
- U.S. National Historic Landmark
- U.S. Historic district – Contributing property
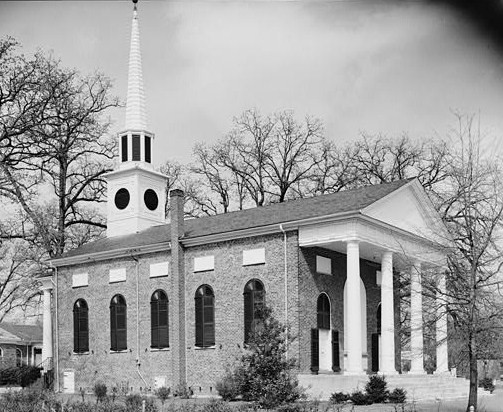

- Location within South Carolina Location within the United States
- Location: 502 Dekalb St., Camden, South Carolina
- Coordinates: 34°14′46″N 80°36′19.28″W
- Area: less than one acre
- Built: 1822
- Architect: Robert Mills; Simons & Lapham
- Architectural style: Early Republic
- Part of: City of Camden Historic District (ID71000787)
- NRHP reference No.: 85003258

Significant dates
- Added to NRHP: February 4, 1985
- Designated NHL: February 4, 1985
- Designated CP: May 6, 1971

Bethesda Presbyterian Church is a historic church at 502 DeKalb Street in Camden, South Carolina. A National Historic Landmark, the main church building was built in 1822 and is one of few surviving churches designed by 19th-century American architect Robert Mills.

== Description and history ==
The Bethesda Presbyterian Church is set on the north side of DeKalb Street (United States Route 1) in the center of Camden. The church campus includes six buildings: the main sanctuary, John Knox Hall, the Bethesda Christian School, Hammet Chapel, the McAm Building, and Westminster Hall. In front of the sanctuary is a monument, like the sanctuary designed by Robert Mills, dedicated to the memory of the Baron DeKalb, a Continental Army soldier killed in the 1780 Battle of Camden.

The main sanctuary is a rectangular brick building, with a four-columned portico on the south (street-facing) facade and a modest steeple at the north end. The front facade of the building is laid in Flemish bond, while the other three sides are laid in American bond. Behind the south portico is a large central round arch niche, which is flanked by symmetrical entrances. The north facade, which now serves as the main entrance, has a Tuscan portico sheltering a pair of staircases leading up to the gallery level. A pair of entrances provide access to the main level, and there is a round-arch window opening centered above. The side walls each have five round-arch windows. The interior is organized with the pulpit and altar at the south end, with a balcony at the north, supported by unfluted columns. Decorative elements of the balcony include dentillated elements, recessed panels, and fluted pilasters.

The Presbyterian Church in Camden was established before the American Revolutionary War; its first sanctuary was destroyed during that war, and two more were built c. 1790 and 1806 to satisfy the needs of a grown congregation. The present sanctuary was designed by Robert Mills, then already an architect of some reputation, and was completed in 1822. It is stylistically more Classical than some of his later work, and is one of his few surviving ecclesiastical designs. Although the building underwent a number of alterations, especially in the late 19th century, most of these changes were reversed in the 20th century, and the building bears a significant resemblance to Mills' original design.

The church (along with the accompanying DeKalb monument) was declared a National Historic Landmark in 1985. It is also a contributing property within the City of Camden Historic District.

=== Folklore ===
Local folklore suggests the Church is haunted by Agnes of Glasgow, who was supposedly buried in the graveyard and remains searching for her lost lover.

== See also ==
- List of National Historic Landmarks in South Carolina
- National Register of Historic Places listings in Kershaw County, South Carolina
- Bethesda Presbyterian Church (McConnells, South Carolina)
