= Cool Springs (Carvers Creek, North Carolina) =

Historic house in North Carolina, United States

- U.S. National Register of Historic Places
- Location within North Carolina Location within the United States
- Location: Off SR 1607 at Cumberland, near Carvers Creek, North Carolina
- Coordinates: 35°14′02″N 78°52′29″W
- Area: 10 acres (4.0 ha)
- Built: c. 1815-1820, c. 1825-1830
- Architectural style: Greek Revival, Federal
- NRHP reference No.: 85002417
- Added to NRHP: September 19, 1985

Cool Springs was a historic home located near Carvers Creek, Cumberland County, North Carolina. It consisted of two sections: a 1 1/2-story Federal style coastal cottage form section dated to about 1815-1820 and a two-story, Greek Revival style section dated to about 1825–1830. Also on the property are the contributing barn; a late-19th century storage building; a mid-19th century one-story house, said to have been a school; and a spring house. The house has been demolished.

It was listed on the National Register of Historic Places in 1985.
