= Dunbarton, South Carolina =

Town in South Carolina, U.S.

Coordinates: 33°11′46″N 81°32′20″W

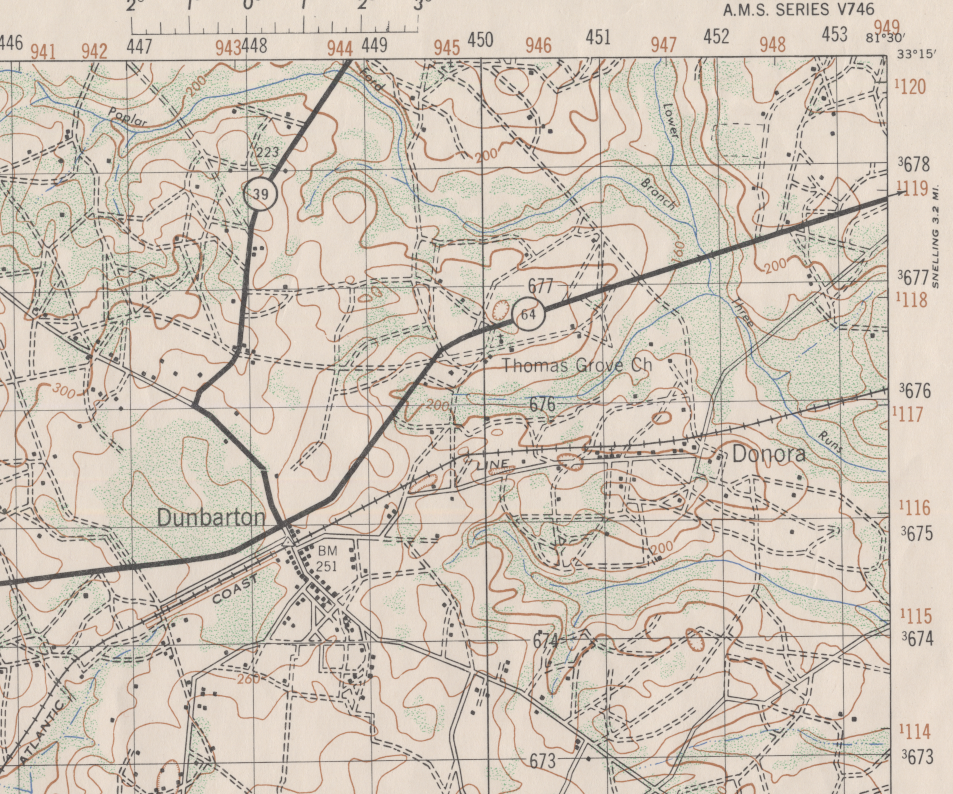
Dunbarton SC 1949 Topographic Map

Dunbarton was a town in Barnwell County, South Carolina, United States. The area was originally settled circa 1800. Dunbarton grew after a train stop was built on a new rail line. In 1951, it was acquired by the U.S. Atomic Energy Commission as part of a site for the Savannah River Plant. The nearest incorporated community is the town of Snelling, to the northeast.

== History ==
=== Early history ===
The settlement of the town began with the construction of the Atlantic Coast Line in 1899 from Denmark, South Carolina, to Robins, South Carolina. Robins was on the railroad from Port Royal to Augusta, Georgia. Robins was in the area taken for the Savannah River Plant. This line of the railroad was later rerouted to the south of Dunbarton. This line is now part of CSX Transportation. The old line east of Dunbarton is a spur that now services the Savannah River Site.

The town of Dunbarton was incorporated in 1910. Dunbarton is named after the Dunbar family. It was an agricultural, trading, and sawmill town. By the early 1950s, Dunbarton had a population of about 300, about 35 residences, about 15 commercial buildings, one church, two schools including Dunbarton High School, two cotton gins, and the railroad station. Four Mile High School, an African-American high school, was located just outside the town of Dunbarton. It had dormitories so that some students could board during the week.

=== Exodus ===
On November 28, 1950, the U.S. Atomic Energy Commission and the E. I. du Pont de Nemours Company announced that the Savannah River Plant would be built on about 300 sq. mi. of Aiken County, Barnwell County, and Allendale County in South Carolina. The Savannah River Plant was built for the production of plutonium and tritium for the H-bomb.

About 6,000 people and 6,000 graves were to be relocated. This include the incorporated communities of Dunbarton and Ellenton and the unincorporated communities of Hawthorne, Meyers Mill, Robbins, and Leigh. A significant fraction of those removed were African-American farmers and sharecroppers.

The government purchased or condemned the property. Many of the residents moved themselves, and in some cases, their homes to Barnwell, Williston, Jackson, Beech Island, Aiken, South Carolina, and Augusta, Georgia. Some moved out of state. Eventually, nearly all that was left behind was the streets, curbs, driveways, and walkways.

== Geography ==
Dunbarton's location was approximately 33°12'40" N and 81°33' W. It was located at the intersection of South Carolina highways 39 and 64 and the railroad. Highway 64 is now SRS "B." Highway 39 is now SRS "F" north of "B" and "B-6" south of "B."

== Legacy ==
An annual reunion of former Dunbarton residents started in 1952 and continues to this day.
