= Carter Hall =

Carter Hall can refer to:

- Carter Hall (Millwood, Virginia), the estate of Lt.Col. Nathaniel Burwell (1750–1814), now a conference center owned by Project Hope
- Two U.S. Navy ships have been named in honor of Carter Hall:
  - USS Carter Hall (LSD-3) (1943–1969)
  - USS Carter Hall (LSD-50) (1993— )
- Hawkman (Carter Hall), the DC Comics superhero
- A brand of pipe tobacco sold by John Middleton Co.
