= Washington District, South Carolina =

Coordinates: 34.71°N 82.61°W

Washington District is a former judicial district in South Carolina. It existed as a district from 19 February 1791 to 1 January 1800. The court house and jail for Washington District were in Pickensville, South Carolina.

In the colonial period, the land around the coast was divided into parishes corresponding to the parishes of the Church of England. There were also several counties that had judicial and electoral functions. As people settled the backcountry, judicial districts and additional counties were formed. This structure continued and grew after the Revolutionary War. In 1800, all counties were renamed as districts. In 1868, the districts were converted back to counties. The South Carolina Department of Archives and History has maps that show the boundaries of counties, districts, and parishes starting in 1682. Unlike the counties that were renamed as districts and later as counties, the Washington District is distinct from Washington County, South Carolina, which was a subdivision of Charleston District from 12 March 1785 to 19 February 1791.

Washington District was created on 19 February 1791 from the former Cherokee Indian lands. It consisted of Pendleton County and Greenville County. In terms of current counties, it included Anderson and Pickens counties; the western section of Greenville County and all but about 70 square miles (180 km^{2}) along the Chattooga River of Oconee County. The land along the Chattooga belonged the Cherokee and Creek peoples.

The district court house and jail were in Pickensville, which was named for General Andrew Pickens. Prior to 1792, it had been named Rockville. Pickensville was in the present Pickens County south of U.S. Route 123 at the junction of SC 8 and SC 135 near Easley, South Carolina.

When Greenville and Pendleton Districts were created from their respective counties on 1 January 1800, Washington District was disbanded.
