= Carter Hill (Camden, South Carolina) =

Historic house in South Carolina, United States

- U.S. National Register of Historic Places
- U.S. Historic district
- Location within South Carolina Location within the United States
- Location: 10 miles south of Camden, east of U.S. Route 521, near Camden, South Carolina
- Coordinates: 34°8′8″N 80°32′57″W
- Built: 1840
- Built by: Boykin, Burwell H.
- Architectural style: Late Victorian, Folk Victorian
- NRHP reference No.: 92001231
- Added to NRHP: September 24, 1992

Carter Hill is a historic plantation complex located near Camden, Kershaw County, South Carolina. The overseer's house was built about 1840, and now incorporated into the main house built about 1875. The overseer's house was a one-room house, that incorporates architectural elements in the Greek Revival style. The main house reflects the rural Victorian architectural style predominant after the American Civil War. Also on the property are a log building, a frame building, a pump house, a smokehouse, a dovecote, a hen house, and a barn constructed at various times during the 19th century. It was listed on the National Register of Historic Places in 1992.
