= Historic Camden Revolutionary War Site =

National Historic Site of the United States

- U.S. National Register of Historic Places
- U.S. Historic district
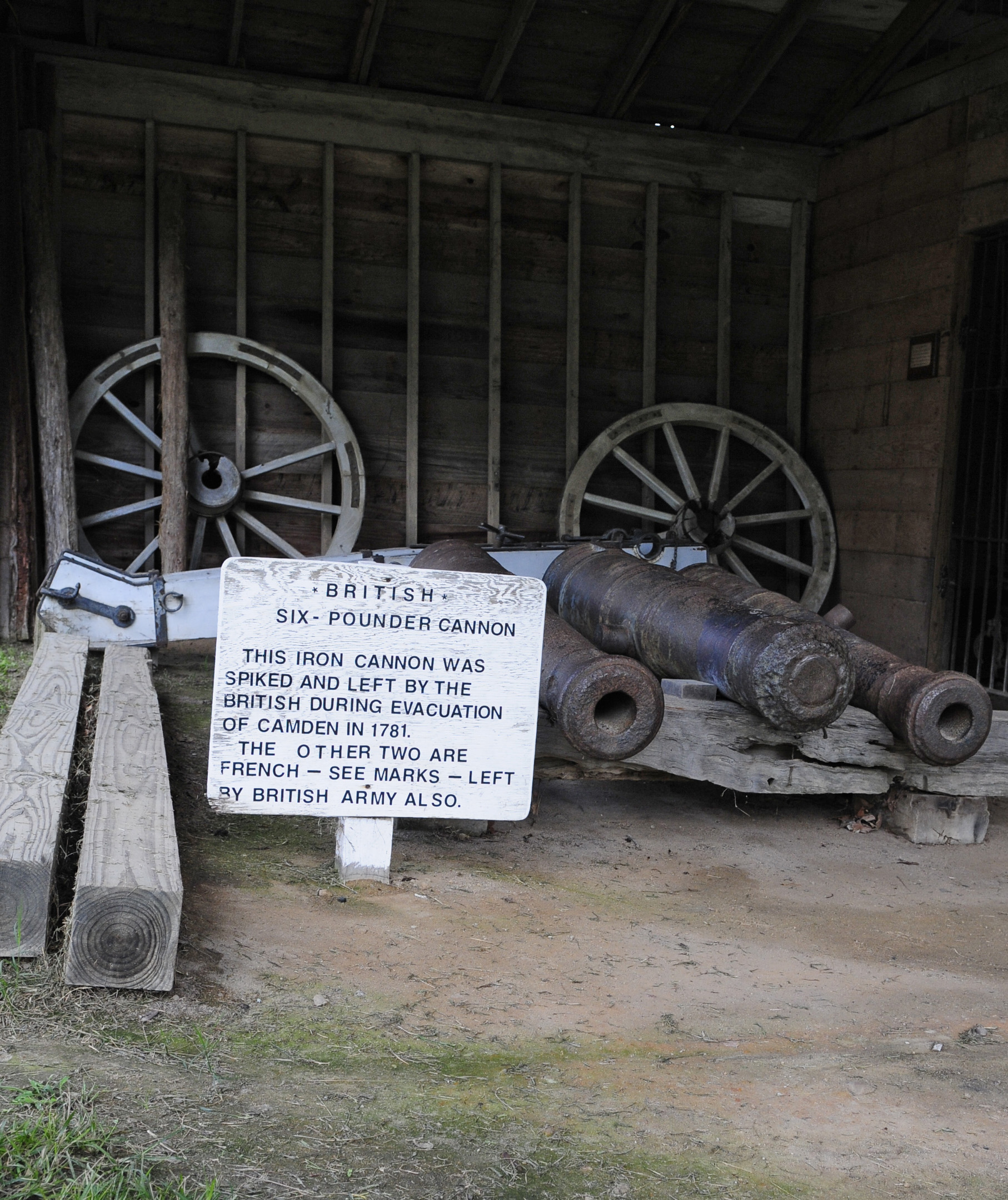
- Historic Camden Revolutionary War restoration, September 2012

- Location within South Carolina Location within the United States
- Location: Camden, South Carolina, United States
- Coordinates: 34°14′02″N 80°36′12″W
- Area: 107 acres (0.43 km^{2})
- NRHP reference No.: 69000170
- Added to NRHP: July 29, 1969

Historic Camden Revolutionary War Site is a national historic district and open-air museum located in Camden, Kershaw County, South Carolina, United States. Roughly 40 minutes away from Columbia, the state capitol, it is one of the state's largest tourist attractions. The 107-acre site is also known as Historic Camden Revolutionary War Restoration, and as the British Revolutionary War Fortifications. Camden contains preserved structures and grounds that are representative of the Southern theater of the American Revolutionary War. The site is managed by a consortium of private donors and local governments. The area is also an affiliated unit of the National Park Service.

== History ==
Following the loss of Charleston, Camden was captured and served as the main British supply post from the spring of 1780 to the spring of 1781 during the American Revolutionary War, and served as their garrison for two major engagements, the Battle of Camden and Battle of Hobkirk's Hill. Camden was also strategic in maintaining Britain's control of South Carolina's back country. At the time, Camden consisted of two city blocks of period homes and military barracks surrounded by a palisade log fence, and further protected by five redoubt and three other fortified features (a house, a jail, and a powder magazine) which were placed strategically from 100 to 1000 feet outside the town itself.

The desire to control this territory was great for the British, as Camden was located on a crossroads of the routes to the largest Southern cities of Charleston, South Carolina and Savannah, Georgia. The location of the principal Battle of Camden is nine miles (14 km) north of the site, while several other skirmishes occurred within 20 miles (32 km) of the town. Between the summers of 1780 and 1781, the British were able to claim victory in many of these assaults, but with high casualty rates. These costly struggles both weakened the Redcoats as a unit and spurred the momentum of an anti-war movement in the British Isles.

The site was listed on the National Register of Historic Places in 1969.

Camden is significant due to the role it played during the war. It was a direct result of England's attempt during late 1779 to attempt to gain control of all the southern colonies.

== Museum ==
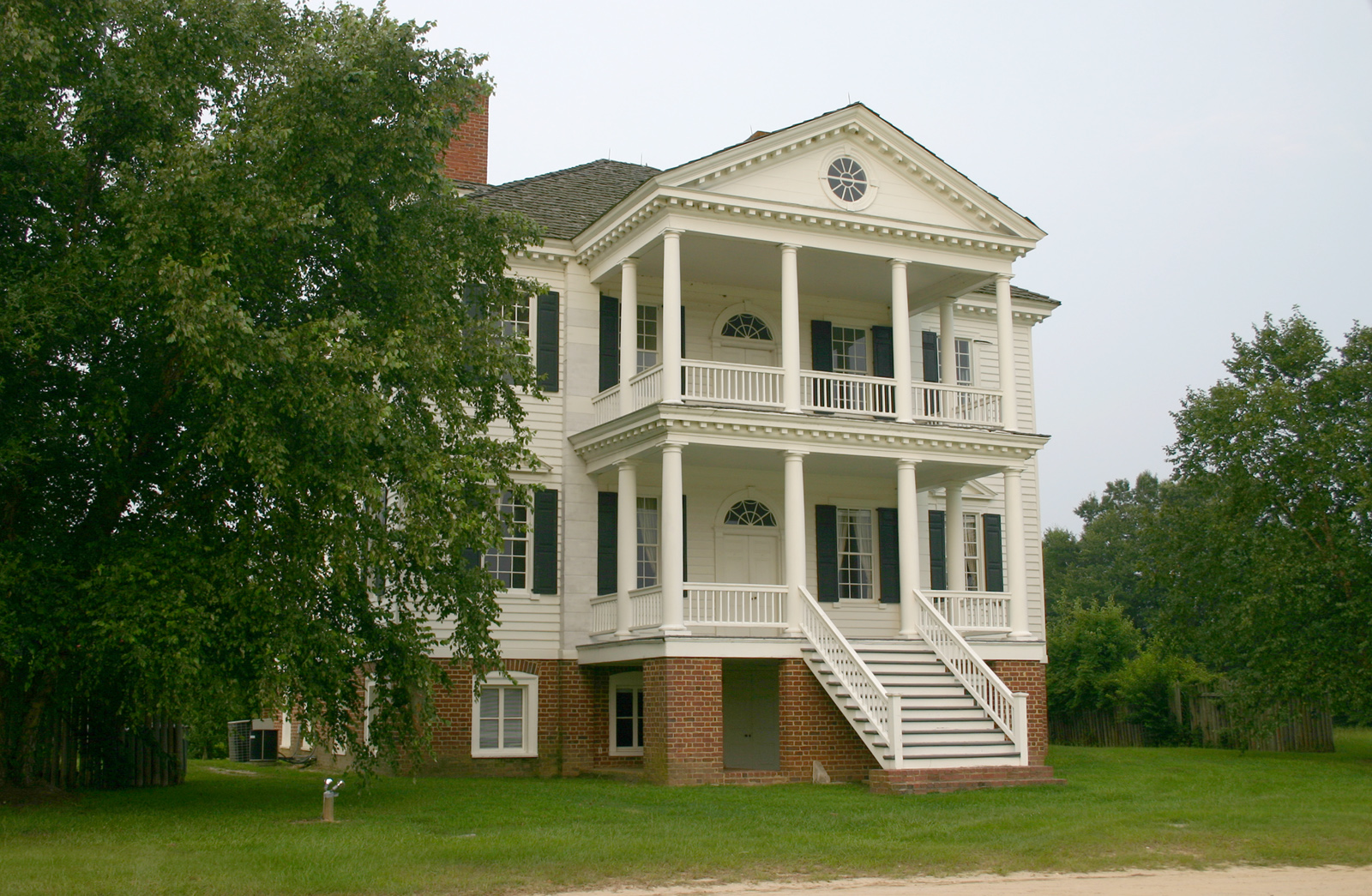
Joseph Kershaw Mansion

Included within the park are a variety of reconstructed and refurbished structures from the colonial-era town site. Many of the restored buildings contain Revolutionary War artifacts recovered from the site.

The museum has a Facebook page that provides visitors with updates, announcements, historical facts about the site, and photos and video of reenactments.

- Joseph Kershaw Mansion, a reconstructed and furnished house built in 1977, also known as the Kershaw-Cornwallis House. The original mansion was used as the British headquarters in the Carolinas by General Charles Cornwallis, during an eleven-month Redcoat occupation of the town.
- In 1785, John Craven House, restored and furnished
- In 1830, Cunningham House, which houses the tour office and gift shop
- Two log houses built around 1800 now house exhibits about the war and the Colonial era: Bradley house and Craven House.
- A moat that had existed during the Revolution was also rebuilt on the grounds.
- Throughout the park are reconstructed multiple military fortifications to represent what they would have looked like during the time of the Revolution.
- A blacksmith exhibit provides live action tutorials on classic colonial forms of blacksmithing.

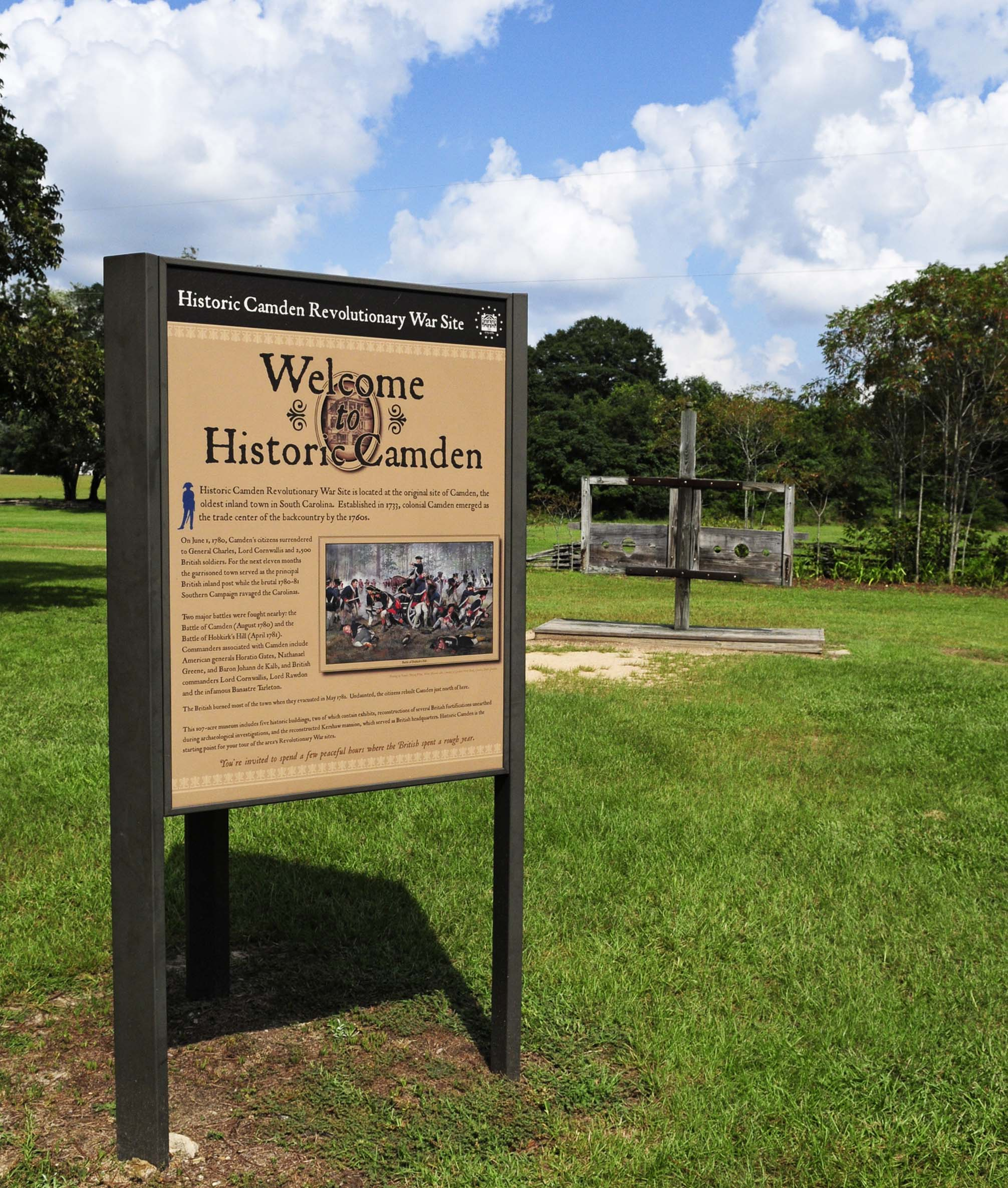
Historic Camden

== Activities, events and re-enactments ==
For many years during the first weekend in November, Historic Camden hosted the popular event, "Revolutionary War Field Days". In 2020 the re-enactment, operated by Southern Campaign 1780, moved to 1208 Keys Lane in Kershaw, SC. This change was made due to changes in the administration and space limitations at the Historic Camden venue.

The museum also offers various guided and unguided tours along with a .7-mile nature trail and picnic area.

Historic Camden also allows people to volunteer at the site. Camden is mainly funded by charitable donations and small local government funding, so volunteers are key to maintaining it and its facilities.
