= Camden Battlefield =

- U.S. National Register of Historic Places
- U.S. National Historic Landmark
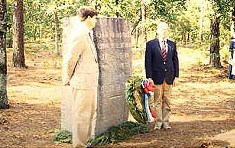
- Camden Battlefield Marker

- Location within South Carolina Location within the United States
- Location: 5 miles north of Camden on U.S. Routes 521 and 601, near Camden, South Carolina
- Coordinates: 34°20′47″N 80°36′27″W
- Area: 2,000 acres (8.1 km^{2})
- Built: 1780
- NRHP reference No.: 66000707

Significant dates
- Added to NRHP: October 15, 1966
- Designated NHL: January 20, 1961

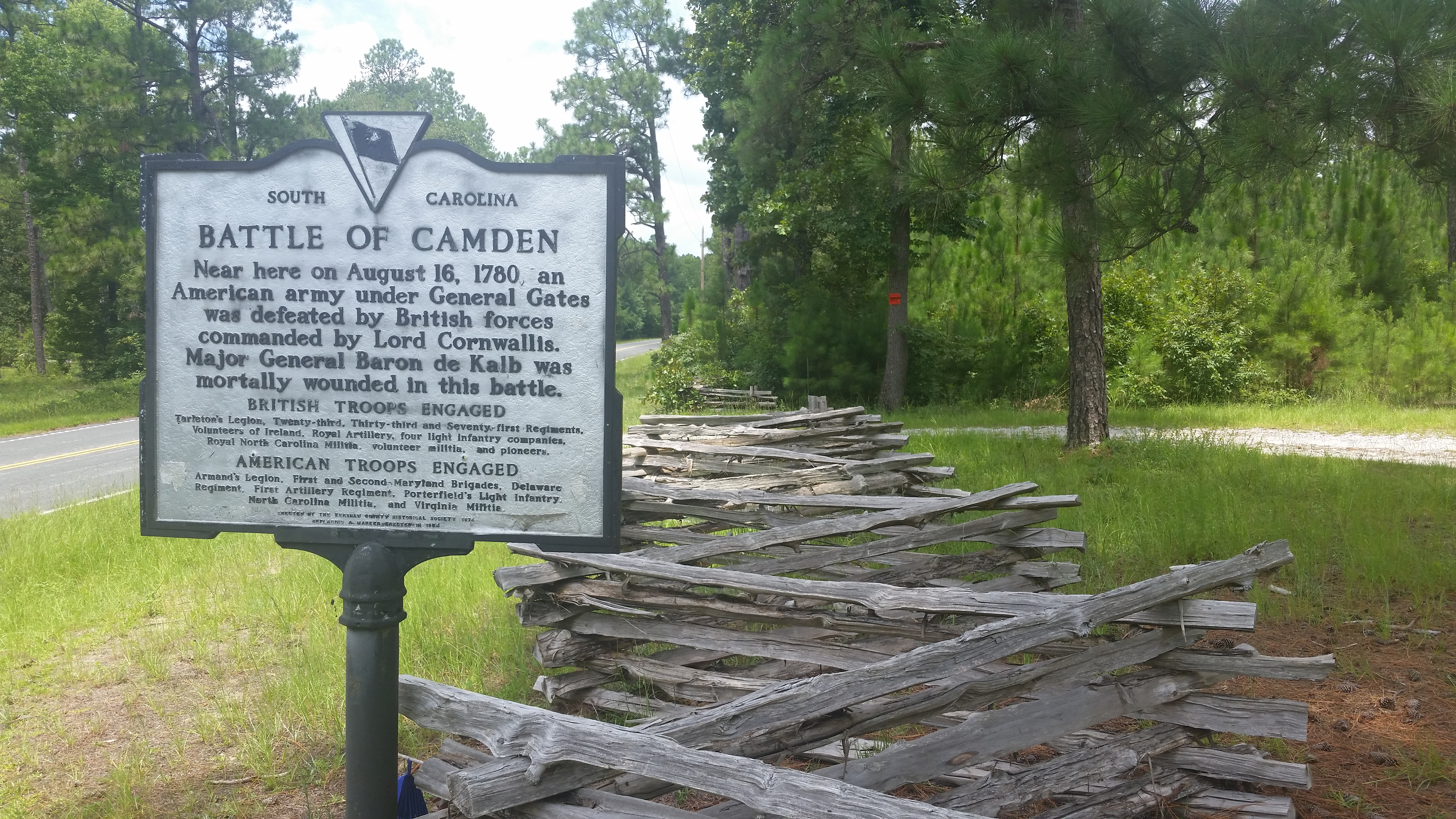
Battle of Camden Historical Marker

The Camden Battlefield is the site of the Battle of Camden on 16 August 1780, a British victory by General Charles Cornwallis over a mixed force of Continental Army regulars and state militia forces led by General Horatio Gates. The battlefield sprawls over an area estimated to be 2,000 acres (8.1 km^{2}) about 6 miles (9.7 km) north of Camden, South Carolina, bounded on the north by Lake Shamokin, and extending south. Flat Rock Rd (S-28-58) passes roughly through the center of the battlefield, and United States Route 521 marks its eastern boundary. The American Battlefield Trust and its partners have acquired and preserved more than 294 acres of the battlefield as of mid-2023. It was declared a National Historic Landmark in 1961.

== Description and history ==
British General Charles Cornwallis, had encamped at Camden in the summer of 1780 to secure northern South Carolina against the threat of Continental Army forces in North Carolina. These forces, only recently placed under the command of General Horatio Gates, advanced to Rugeley's Mill, about 6 miles (9.7 km) north of Camden on August 15. Both commanders then ordered a night march to attack the other. These forces met in the dark at 2:00 AM on the morning of August 16. After a brief clash, both sides formed lines, and resumed the battle at daybreak. The battle was a rout, as the militia forces under Gates' command threw down their weapons and fled at the first gunfire, and his Continental forces were eventually surrounded and forced to surrender, with their commander, Baron Johann de Kalb suffering mortal injuries. The defeat marked a low point in the battle for American independence.

The area where this battle took place is roughly defined by Gum Swamp Creek and another further to its east, both of which drain into Lake Shamokin to the north. This area is roughly bisected by Flat Rock Rd, along which a marker has been placed where Baron de Kalb fell. The battlefield area measures about 1 mile (1.6 km) east-west and 3 miles (4.8 km) north-south. The area is largely composed of grasslands and forest, much as it would have been at the time of the battle.

== See also ==
- List of National Historic Landmarks in South Carolina
- National Register of Historic Places in Kershaw County, South Carolina
