= Kendall Mill Historic District =

Historic district in South Carolina, United States

- U.S. National Register of Historic Places
- U.S. Historic district
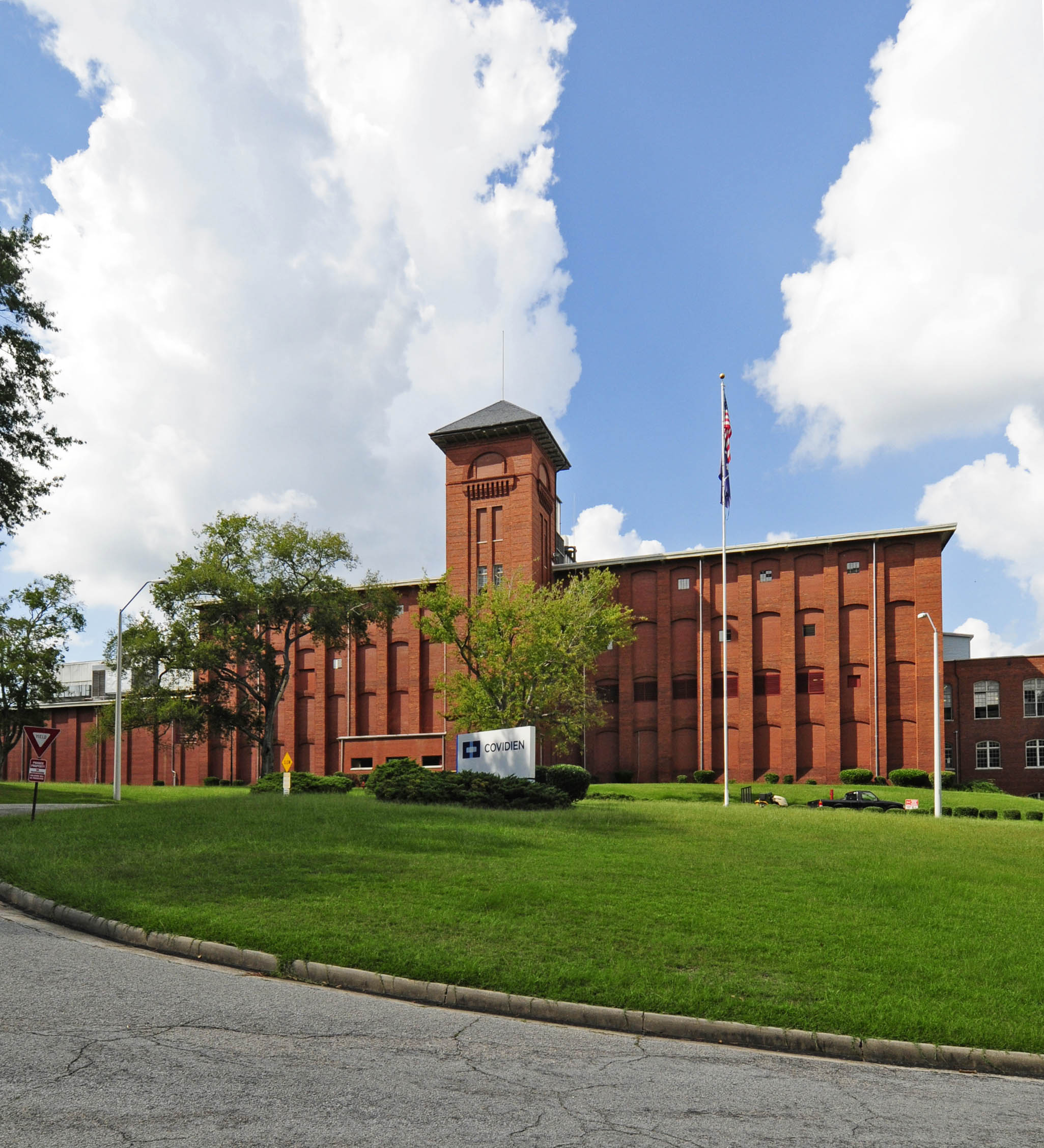
- Kendall Mill Historic District, September 2012

- Location within South Carolina Location within the United States
- Location: Roughly bounded by RR tracks, Kendall Lake, Lakeshore Dr., McRae Rd., and Haile St., Camden, South Carolina
- Coordinates: 34°15′33″N 80°35′28″W
- Area: 120 acres (49 ha)
- Built: c. 1901
- Architect: Whaley, W.B. Smith
- NRHP reference No.: 82003870
- Added to NRHP: March 19, 1982

Kendall Mill Historic District is a historic mill complex, mill village, and national historic district located at Camden, Kershaw County, South Carolina. The district encompasses 119 contributing buildings, 1 contributing sites, and 1 contributing structure in Camden. The district is centered on the Wateree Plant and associated structures that date from 1899 to 1923. The mill village to the south and southeast of the plant was built between 1900 and ca. 1925 and is a virtually intact reminder of the importance of the textile industry to South Carolina. The mill faces Kendall Park, a ten-acre landscaped park. On the eastern border of the park are the mill supervisors’ houses, built between 1900 and ca. 1925. The operatives house consist of one-story, 1 1/2-story, and a few two-story frame houses which date from 1900 to 1923. The district also includes Kendall Lake, north of the mill. The Dekalb Cotton Mill was organized in 1899. The Dekalb Mill building, designed by W.B. Smith Whaley in the Romanesque Revival style, was considered a model of textile architecture. The original plant building is a four-story rectangular brick building with a back stair tower and an imposing six-story front stair tower. The west addition to the plant, which is in keeping, architecturally, with the older buildings, was constructed in 1964. It is located in the City of Camden Historic District.

It was listed on the National Register of Historic Places in 1982.
