= Cool Springs (Camden, South Carolina) =

Historic house in South Carolina, United States

- U.S. National Register of Historic Places
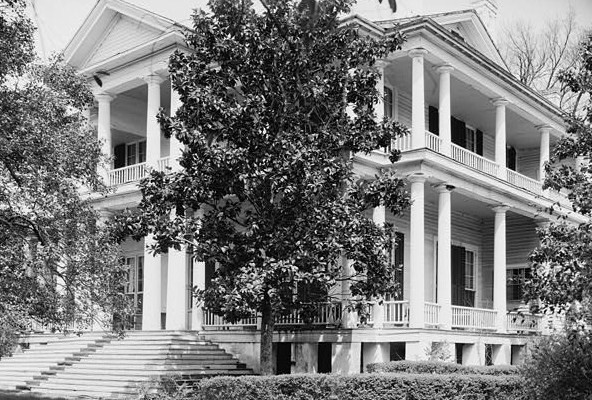
- Cool Springs, HABS Photo

- Location within South Carolina Location within the United States
- Location: 726 Kershaw Highway, near Camden, South Carolina
- Coordinates: 34°17′37″N 80°36′36″W
- Area: 16 acres (6.5 ha)
- Built: c. 1832, c. 1850
- Architect: Reuben Hamilton
- Architectural style: Greek Revival
- NRHP reference No.: 89001596
- Added to NRHP: September 28, 1989

Cool Springs is a historic home located near Camden, Kershaw County, South Carolina. It was built about 1832, and is a two-story Greek Revival style house on a raised brick basement. The original house was remodeled in the 1850s. It features a tiered portico and verandahs, supported by 64 Doric order columns. A two-story kitchen addition was attached to the house about 1935. Also on the property are the contributing two horse stables, a concrete piscatory, an old stone spring, a brick basin, a dam, and granite gate posts.

It was listed on the National Register of Historic Places in 1989.
