= Claremont County, South Carolina =

County in South Carolina, United States

Coordinates: 34°3′N 80°24′W

Claremont County was a county in east central South Carolina. Its county seat was Stateburg. It lasted from its creation in 1785, when it was created from the Camden District, until it was absorbed into the newly created Sumter District in 1800.
