= Kershaw County, South Carolina =

County in South Carolina, United States

- County
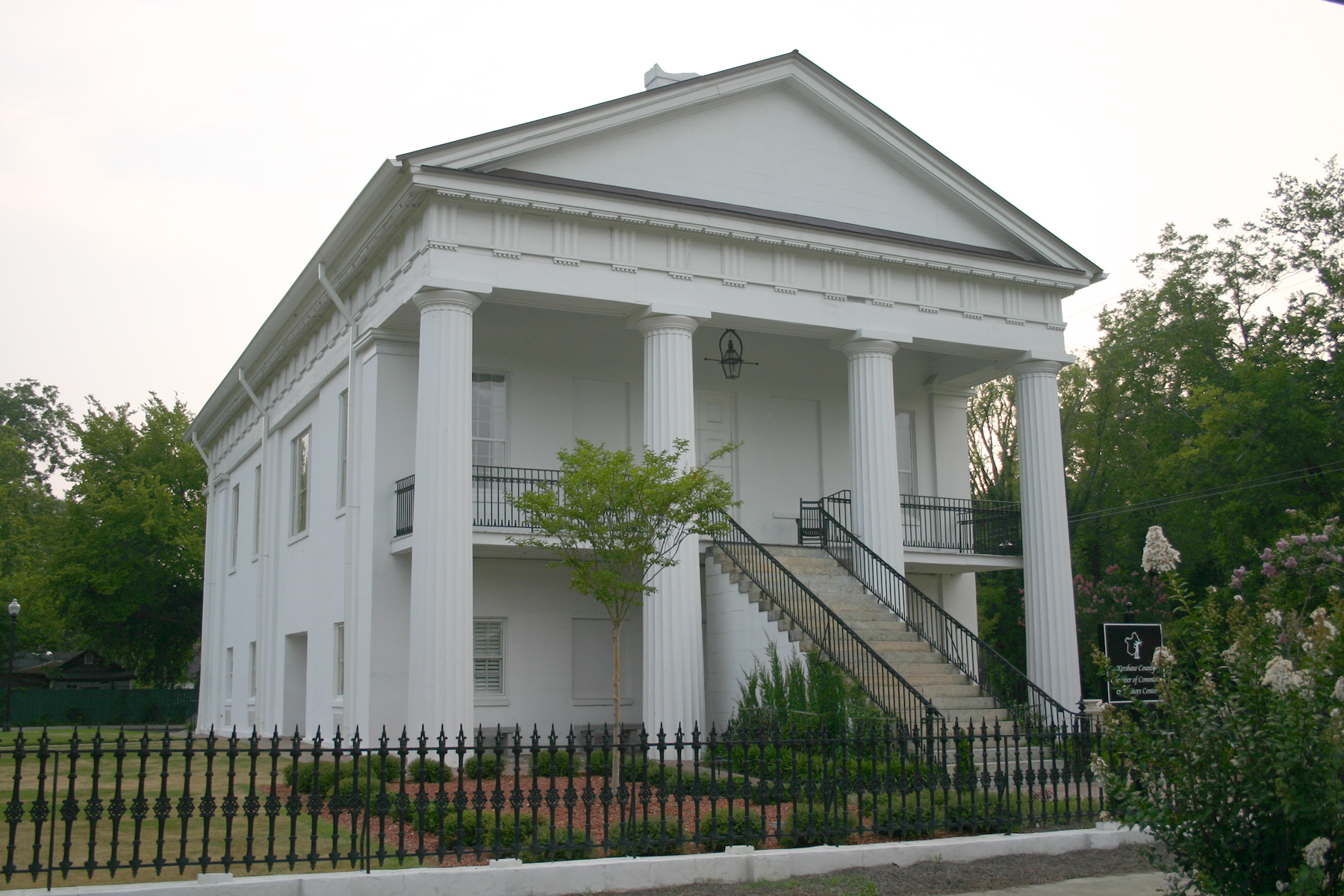
- Old Kershaw County Courthouse in Camden

- Seal Logo

- Location within the U.S. state of South Carolina
- Interactive map of Kershaw County, South Carolina
- Coordinates: 34.34°N 80.59°W
- Country: United States
- State: South Carolina
- Founded: 1791
- Named for: Joseph Brevard Kershaw
- Seat: Camden
- Largest community: Camden

Area
  - Total: 740.26 sq mi (1,917.3 km^{2})
  - Land: 726.61 sq mi (1,881.9 km^{2})
  - Water: 13.65 sq mi (35.4 km^{2}) 1.84%

Population (2020)
  - Total: 65,403
  - Estimate (2025): 73,166 ▲
  - Density: 90.011/sq mi (34.753/km^{2})
- Time zone: UTC−5 (Eastern)
  - Summer (DST): UTC−4 (EDT)
- Congressional district: 5th
- Website: www.kershaw.sc.gov

Kershaw County is a county located in the U.S. state of South Carolina. As of the 2020 census, its population was 65,403. The county seat and largest community is Camden. The county was created in 1791 from parts of Claremont, Lancaster, Fairfield, and Richland counties. It is named for Col. Joseph Kershaw (1727–1791), an early settler and American Revolutionary War patriot. Kershaw County is part of the Columbia, SC Metropolitan Statistical Area.

== History ==
Kershaw County was named for Col. Joseph Kershaw (1727–1791), an early settler considered as "the father of Camden". Originally part of Camden District, Kershaw County was formed in 1791 from parts of Claremont, Lancaster, Fairfield, and Richland counties. The county seat is Camden, the oldest inland city in South Carolina. This site was settled around 1732 by English traders and farmers who moved inland from Charleston. Welsh Baptists moved the area in large numbers in the 1740s and 1750s. At the time, in England and Wales Protestants who were not from the established Anglican church were politically disadvantaged in various ways, however, in South Carolina they could still practice freely (provided that they called their churches "meeting houses.") Baptists from Abergavenny, Trap, Carmarthenshire, Llanbedr, Crickhowell, Vale of Grwyney, Abertillery, Griffithstown and Brecon arrived in what has since become Kershaw County between 1740 and 1760, primarily arriving as large family units. They were joined by a similar migration of English Baptists who came from Long Sutton, Lincolnshire, Boston, Lincolnshire, Coningsby, Grantham, as well as Christchurch, Dorset and Lymington. From about 1800 until about 1867, the county was known as Kershaw District.

During the American Revolutionary War, the British occupied Camden from June 1780 to May 1781. Fourteen battles took place in the area, including the Battle of Camden in 1780 and the Battle of Hobkirk's Hill in 1781.

After the state seceded from the Union, six men from Kershaw served in the American Civil War as Confederate generals: James Cantey (1818–1873), James Chesnut (1815–1885), John Doby Kennedy (1840–1896), Joseph Brevard Kershaw (1822–1894), and John Bordenave Villepigue (1830–1862), Zachariah C. Deas (1819–1882). Richard Rowland Kirkland, a Confederate soldier, was also from Kershaw County. He served under General Kershaw. In the last months of the war, Union troops under Gen. William T. Sherman burned parts of Camden in February 1865, in their March to the Sea.

Under the 1868 South Carolina Constitution, the Kershaw District became home rule Kershaw County with the state representatives also being county commissioners. During the Reconstruction era, some freedmen and other men of color were elected to various political offices. Among them was Henry Cardozo, who had been pastor of Old Bethel Methodist Church in Charleston, South Carolina. He served in the state senate as a Republican from Kershaw County, from 1870 to 1874. (February 1, 1836 – July 22, 1903) was an American clergyman, politician, and educator. When Francis Lewis Cardozo was elected in South Carolina as Secretary of State in 1868, he was the first African American to hold a statewide office in the United States.

During World War I, two Kershaw County men were awarded the Medal of Honor in two separate actions while fighting in France in October 1918. The first was Richmond Hobson Hilton, recognized for actions taking place on October 11, 1918, during which he lost an arm. The second was John Canty Villepigue on October 15, 1918; he was wounded so severely in the action for which he was recognized that he died several months later from his injuries. Villepigue was a descendant of General John B. Villepigue noted above.

Statesman and financier Bernard M. Baruch (1870–1965), labor leader Lane Kirkland, and baseball player Larry Doby, the first African-American player in the American League, were each born in Kershaw County. Former South Carolina Governor John C. West was also from Kershaw County.

== Geography ==
According to the U.S. Census Bureau, the county has a total area of 740.26 square miles (1,917.3 km^{2}), of which 726.61 square miles (1,881.9 km^{2}) is land and 13.65 square miles (35.4 km^{2}) (1.84%) is water. Kershaw County is one of three counties that compromises Lake Wateree, in which the lake is compromised with the Wateree River, which flows through Kershaw County.

=== Earthquakes ===
Between December 2021 and December 2022, southeastern Kershaw County experienced over 80 earthquakes, 11 of which exceeded a 2.5 magnitude. 6 of the quakes exceeded a 3.0 magnitude, the largest of which registering at a 3.6.

=== National protected areas ===
- Historic Camden Revolutionary War Site
- Camden Battlefield, site of the Battle of Camden
- Boykin Mill Complex
- Kendall Mill Historic District

=== State and local protected areas ===
- Camden Battlefield and Longleaf Pine Preserve
- Goodale State Park
- Liberty Hill Wildlife Management Area
- Powderkegg Wildlife Preserve
- Savage Bay Heritage Park

=== Major water bodies ===
- Beaver Creek
- Black Creek
- Catawba River
- Lake Wateree
- Lynches River
- Raglins Creek
- Wateree River

=== Adjacent counties ===
- Lancaster County – north
- Chesterfield County – northeast
- Lee County – southeast
- Sumter County – southeast
- Richland County – southwest
- Darlington County – east
- Fairfield County – west

=== Major highways ===
- I-20
- US 1
- US 1 Truck (Camden)
- US 1 Truck (Cheraw)
- US 521
- US 521 Bus.
- US 521 Conn.
- US 521 Truck (Camden 1)
- US 521 Truck (Camden 2)
- US 521 Truck (Kershaw)
- US 601
- US 601 Bus.
- US 601 Truck
- SC 12
- SC 34
- SC 34 Truck
- SC 97
- SC 261
- SC 522
- SC 903

=== Major infrastructure ===
- Camden Station
- Woodward Field (Kershaw County Airport)

== Demographics ==
Historical population
Census	Pop.	Note	%±
1800	7,340		—
1810	9,867		34.4%
1820	12,432		26.0%
1830	13,545		9.0%
1840	12,281		−9.3%
1850	14,473		17.8%
1860	13,086		−9.6%
1870	11,754		−10.2%
1880	21,538		83.2%
1890	22,361		3.8%
1900	24,696		10.4%
1910	27,094		9.7%
1920	29,398		8.5%
1930	32,070		9.1%
1940	32,913		2.6%
1950	32,287		−1.9%
1960	33,585		4.0%
1970	34,727		3.4%
1980	39,015		12.3%
1990	43,599		11.7%
2000	52,647		20.8%
2010	61,697		17.2%
2020	65,403		6.0%
2025 (est.)	73,166	▲	11.9%
U.S. Decennial Census; 1790–1960 1900–1990; 1990–2000 2010 2020

=== Racial and ethnic composition ===
Kershaw County, South Carolina – Racial and ethnic composition Note: the US Census treats Hispanic/Latino as an ethnic category. This table excludes Latinos from the racial categories and assigns them to a separate category. Hispanics/Latinos may be of any race.
Race / Ethnicity (NH = Non-Hispanic)	Pop 1980	Pop 1990	Pop 2000	Pop 2010	Pop 2020	% 1980	% 1990	% 2000	% 2010	% 2020
White alone (NH)	26,560	30,862	37,226	43,009	43,391	68.08%	70.79%	70.71%	69.71%	66.34%
Black or African American alone (NH)	11,999	12,315	13,780	15,057	15,083	30.75%	28.25%	26.17%	24.40%	23.06%
Native American or Alaska Native alone (NH)	23	68	141	182	146	0.06%	0.16%	0.27%	0.29%	0.22%
Asian alone (NH)	44	97	162	296	417	0.11%	0.22%	0.31%	0.48%	0.64%
Native Hawaiian or Pacific Islander alone (NH)	x	x	8	26	29	x	x	0.02%	0.04%	0.04%
Other race alone (NH)	31	12	53	55	239	0.08%	0.03%	0.10%	0.09%	0.37%
Mixed race or Multiracial (NH)	x	x	391	774	2,632	x	x	0.74%	1.25%	4.02%
Hispanic or Latino (any race)	358	245	886	2,298	3,466	0.92%	0.56%	1.68%	3.72%	5.30%
Total	39,015	43,599	52,647	61,697	65,403	100.00%	100.00%	100.00%	100.00%	100.00%

=== 2020 census ===
As of the 2020 census, there were 65,403 people, 25,957 households, and 16,019 families residing in the county. The median age was 42.3 years, with 22.8% of residents under the age of 18 and 19.3% aged 65 or older; there were 93.0 males for every 100 females and 90.0 males for every 100 females age 18 or over.

Of the 25,957 households in the county, 31.0% had children under the age of 18 living with them and 28.3% had a female householder with no spouse or partner present. About 26.2% of all households were made up of individuals and 12.6% had someone living alone who was 65 years of age or older.

There were 28,874 housing units, of which 10.1% were vacant. Among occupied housing units, 79.1% were owner-occupied and 20.9% were renter-occupied. The homeowner vacancy rate was 1.4% and the rental vacancy rate was 7.6%.

The racial makeup of the county was 67.4% White, 23.3% Black or African American, 0.4% American Indian and Alaska Native, 0.6% Asian, 0.0% Native Hawaiian and Pacific Islander, 2.6% from some other race, and 5.6% from two or more races. Hispanic or Latino residents of any race comprised 5.3% of the population.

47.2% of residents lived in urban areas, while 52.8% lived in rural areas.

=== 2010 census ===
At the 2010 census, there were 61,697 people, 23,928 households, and 17,114 families living in the county. The population density was 84.9 inhabitants per square mile (32.8 inhabitants/km^{2}). There were 27,478 housing units at an average density of 37.8 units per square mile (14.6 units/km^{2}). The racial makeup of the county was 71.3% white, 24.6% black or African American, 0.5% Asian, 0.3% American Indian, 1.7% from other races, and 1.6% from two or more races. Those of Hispanic or Latino origin made up 3.7% of the population. In terms of ancestry, 28.1% were American, 7.8% were English, 7.7% were Irish, and 6.3% were German.

Of the 23,928 households, 34.9% had children under the age of 18 living with them, 51.6% were married couples living together, 15.1% had a female householder with no husband present, 28.5% were non-families, and 24.5% of all households were made up of individuals. The average household size was 2.56 and the average family size was 3.02. The median age was 40.2 years.

The median income for a household in the county was $44,064 and the median income for a family was $53,053. Males had a median income of $40,794 versus $30,553 for females. The per capita income for the county was $21,777. About 12.1% of families and 15.5% of the population were below the poverty line, including 21.6% of those under age 18 and 11.5% of those age 65 or over.

=== 2000 census ===
At the 2000 census, there were 52,647 people, 20,188 households, and 14,918 families living in the county. The population density was 72 people per square mile (28 people/km^{2}). There were 22,683 housing units at an average density of 31 units per square mile (12 units/km^{2}). The racial makeup of the county was 71.61% White, 26.29% Black or African American, 0.29% Native American, 0.31% Asian, 0.03% Pacific Islander, 0.62% from other races, and 0.84% from two or more races. 1.68% of the population were Hispanic or Latino of any race.

There were 20,188 households, out of which 33.70% had children under the age of 18 living with them, 55.80% were married couples living together, 13.60% had a female householder with no husband present, and 26.10% were non-families. 22.60% of all households were made up of individuals, and 8.90% had someone living alone who was 65 years of age or older. The average household size was 2.58 and the average family size was 3.02.

In the county, the population was spread out, with 26.10% under the age of 18, 7.60% from 18 to 24, 28.80% from 25 to 44, 24.50% from 45 to 64, and 12.90% who were 65 years of age or older. The median age was 37 years. For every 100 females, there were 93.40 males. For every 100 females age 18 and over, there were 90.00 males.

The median income for a household in the county was $38,804, and the median income for a family was $44,836. Males had a median income of $32,246 versus $22,714 for females. The per capita income for the county was $18,360. About 9.70% of families and 12.80% of the population were below the poverty line, including 16.90% of those under age 18 and 14.10% of those age 65 or over.

== Government and politics ==
United States presidential election results for Kershaw County, South Carolina
Year	Republican		Democratic		Third party(ies)	
Year	No.	%	No.	%	No.	%
1900	43	4.51%	910	95.49%	0	0.00%
1904	25	2.86%	850	97.14%	0	0.00%
1912	7	0.95%	708	95.68%	25	3.38%
1916	14	1.39%	989	97.92%	7	0.69%
1920	42	3.51%	1,156	96.49%	0	0.00%
1924	1	0.14%	733	99.86%	0	0.00%
1928	14	1.09%	1,274	98.91%	0	0.00%
1932	8	0.76%	1,051	99.24%	0	0.00%
1936	20	1.41%	1,400	98.59%	0	0.00%
1940	20	1.68%	1,174	98.32%	0	0.00%
1944	21	1.07%	1,872	94.98%	78	3.96%
1948	49	2.49%	302	15.36%	1,615	82.15%
1952	2,935	58.85%	2,052	41.15%	0	0.00%
1956	1,518	28.17%	1,875	34.79%	1,996	37.04%
1960	3,465	52.16%	3,178	47.84%	0	0.00%
1964	5,617	63.94%	3,168	36.06%	0	0.00%
1968	4,079	38.56%	2,539	24.00%	3,960	37.44%
1972	8,035	74.79%	2,531	23.56%	178	1.66%
1976	6,126	49.40%	6,211	50.08%	65	0.52%
1980	6,652	55.55%	5,103	42.62%	219	1.83%
1984	8,822	66.70%	4,323	32.69%	81	0.61%
1988	8,877	65.89%	4,494	33.36%	102	0.76%
1992	8,499	49.12%	6,585	38.06%	2,217	12.81%
1996	8,513	52.05%	6,764	41.36%	1,077	6.59%
2000	11,911	60.53%	7,428	37.75%	338	1.72%
2004	14,160	61.79%	8,515	37.16%	240	1.05%
2008	16,466	58.84%	11,226	40.11%	293	1.05%
2012	16,324	58.41%	11,259	40.29%	363	1.30%
2016	17,542	60.50%	10,330	35.63%	1,123	3.87%
2020	20,471	60.87%	12,699	37.76%	459	1.36%
2024	21,289	63.49%	11,826	35.27%	418	1.25%

== Economy ==
In 2022, the GDP was $2.7 billion (about $38,411 per capita), and the real GDP was $2.2 billion (about $31,215 per capita) in chained 2017 dollars.

As of April 2024, some of the largest employers in the county include Food Lion, Hengst Automotive, Lowe's, Target, and Walmart.

Employment and Wage Statistics by Industry in Kershaw County, South Carolina - Q3 2023
Industry	Employment Counts	Employment Percentage (%)	Average Annual Wage ($)
Accommodation and Food Services	1,662	9.9	19,708
Administrative and Support and Waste Management and Remediation Services	1,165	7.0	34,424
Agriculture, Forestry, Fishing and Hunting	410	2.4	56,524
Arts, Entertainment, and Recreation	189	1.1	20,332
Construction	1,076	6.4	52,052
Finance and Insurance	499	3.0	58,812
Health Care and Social Assistance	2,497	14.9	52,676
Information	72	0.4	63,804
Management of Companies and Enterprises	34	0.2	105,612
Manufacturing	2,392	14.3	60,216
Mining, Quarrying, and Oil and Gas Extraction	118	0.7	111,020
Other Services (except Public Administration)	476	2.8	28,912
Professional, Scientific, and Technical Services	533	3.2	67,392
Public Administration	1,058	6.3	44,928
Real Estate and Rental and Leasing	98	0.6	41,236
Retail Trade	3,653	21.8	34,112
Transportation and Warehousing	515	3.1	66,664
Utilities	137	0.8	59,332
Wholesale Trade	157	0.9	68,952
Total	16,741	100.0%	45,472

== Education ==
The Kershaw County School District serves as the governing body for all public schools in Kershaw County.

Central Carolina Technical College has two branches located in Camden.

Kershaw County is home to Camden Military Academy, the official state military academy of South Carolina. The Montessori School of Camden is a public charter located in Camden.

=== High schools ===
- Camden High School
- Lugoff-Elgin High School
- North Central High School
- Woolard Technology Center

=== Middle schools ===
- Camden Middle School
- Lugoff-Elgin Middle School
- North Central Middle School
- Leslie M. Stover Middle School
- Montessori School of Camden

=== Elementary schools ===
- Camden Elementary School
- Lugoff Elementary School
- Wateree Elementary School
- Blaney Elementary School
- Doby's Mill Elementary School
- North Central Elementary School
- Midway Elementary School
- Pine Tree Hill Elementary School
- Jackson Elementary School
- Montessori School of Camden

== Communities ==
=== City ===
- Camden (county seat and largest community)
- Columbia (small portion)

=== Towns ===
- Bethune
- Elgin

=== Census-designated places ===
- Abney Crossroads
- Boykin
- East Camden
- Lugoff

=== Other unincorporated communities ===
- Antioch
- Buffalo
- Cassatt
- DeKalb
- Liberty Hill
- Mt. Pisgah
- Westville

== Gallery ==
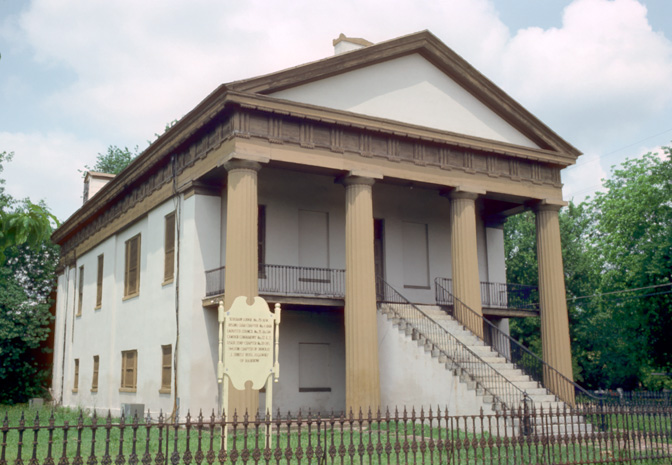
Original Kershaw County Courthouse in 1978

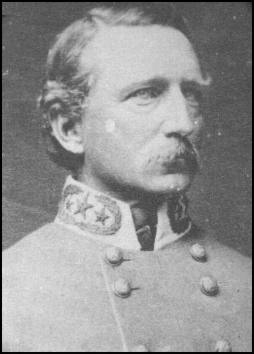
Joseph Brevard Kershaw

== See also ==
- List of counties in South Carolina
- National Register of Historic Places listings in Kershaw County, South Carolina
