= List of South Carolina locations by per capita income =

South Carolina is the thirty-seventh-richest state in the United States of America, with a per capita income of $18,795 (2000).

== South Carolina Counties Ranked by Per Capita Income ==
Note: Data is from the 2010 United States Census Data and the 2006–2010 American Community Survey 5-Year Estimates.

Rank	County	Per capita income	Median household income	Median family income	Population	Number of households
1	Beaufort	$32,731	$55,286	$65,071	162,233	64,945
2	Charleston	$29,401	$48,433	$61,525	350,209	144,309
	United States	$27,334	$51,914	$62,982	308,745,538	116,716,292
3	Lexington	$26,393	$52,205	$64,630	262,391	102,733
4	Greenville	$25,931	$46,830	$59,043	451,225	176,531
5	Richland	$25,805	$47,922	$61,622	384,504	145,194
6	York	$25,707	$51,925	$65,188	226,073	85,864
7	Horry	$24,811	$43,142	$51,608	269,291	112,225
8	Dorchester	$24,497	$55,034	$63,847	136,555	50,259
9	Aiken	$24,172	$44,468	$57,064	160,099	64,253
10	Oconee	$24,055	$42,266	$52,332	74,273	30,676
11	Georgetown	$23,942	$42,666	$54,115	60,158	24,524
	South Carolina	$23,443	$43,939	$54,223	4,625,364	1,801,181
12	Berkeley	$22,865	$50,777	$56,869	177,843	65,419
13	Anderson	$22,117	$42,871	$53,229	187,126	73,829
14	Florence	$21,932	$40,487	$48,896	136,885	52,653
15	Spartanburg	$21,924	$42,680	$53,149	284,307	109,246
16	Kershaw	$21,777	$44,064	$53,053	61,697	23,928
17	Greenwood	$21,728	$38,797	$49,785	69,661	27,547
18	Newberry	$21,410	$41,815	$49,560	37,508	14,709
19	Calhoun	$20,845	$36,790	$51,975	15,175	6,080
20	Pickens	$20,647	$41,898	$53,911	119,224	45,228
21	Darlington	$20,096	$38,379	$46,894	68,681	26,531
22	Edgefield	$19,901	$42,834	$57,114	26,985	9,348
23	Marion	$19,411	$35,858	$43,021	33,062	13,058
24	Lancaster	$19,308	$38,959	$46,388	76,652	29,697
25	Sumter	$18,944	$39,137	$45,460	107,456	40,398
26	Fairfield	$18,877	$32,022	$40,849	23,956	9,419
27	Laurens	$18,757	$37,529	$45,769	66,537	25,525
28	Saluda	$18,717	$40,508	$45,173	19,875	7,527
29	Union	$18,495	$33,470	$42,537	28,961	11,974
30	Jasper	$17,997	$37,393	$45,800	24,777	8,517
31	Cherokee	$17,862	$34,132	$46,164	55,342	21,519
32	Colleton	$17,842	$33,263	$40,955	38,892	15,131
33	Chester	$17,687	$32,743	$42,074	33,140	12,876
34	Barnwell	$17,592	$33,816	$41,764	22,621	8,937
35	Orangeburg	$17,579	$32,849	$40,332	92,501	35,788
36	Chesterfield	$17,162	$32,979	$41,225	46,734	18,173
37	Abbeville	$16,653	$33,143	$45,147	25,417	9,990
38	Marlboro	$16,653	$30,629	$38,043	28,933	10,383
39	Clarendon	$16,562	$33,066	$40,492	34,971	13,132
40	Hampton	$16,262	$34,846	$43,234	21,090	7,598
41	Bamberg	$16,236	$32,538	$41,625	15,987	6,048
42	Dillon	$14,684	$26,818	$34,693	32,062	11,923
43	Allendale	$14,190	$20,081	$25,146	10,419	3,706
44	McCormick	$13,817	$27,688	$32,485	10,233	4,027
45	Williamsburg	$13,513	$24,191	$33,705	34,423	13,007
46	Lee	$12,924	$23,378	$35,279	19,220	6,797

== South Carolina Places Ranked by Per Capita Income ==
Rank	Place	per capita income
1	Briarcliffe Acres, South Carolina	$52,872
2	Seabrook Island, South Carolina	$49,863
3	Sullivan's Island, South Carolina	$49,427
4	Pawleys Island, South Carolina	$48,183
5	Kiawah Island, South Carolina	$47,782
6	Isle of Palms, South Carolina	$44,221
7	Lake Wylie, South Carolina	$43,567
8	Edisto Beach, South Carolina	$39,400
9	Arcadia Lakes, South Carolina	$37,762
10	Tega Cay, South Carolina	$37,275
11	Hilton Head Island, South Carolina	$36,621
12	Rockville, South Carolina	$36,620
13	Lake Murray of Richland, South Carolina	$35,083
14	Five Forks, South Carolina	$32,838
15	Mount Pleasant, South Carolina	$30,823
16	Folly Beach, South Carolina	$30,493
17	Forest Acres, South Carolina	$29,907
18	Northlake, South Carolina	$28,912
19	Murrells Inlet, South Carolina	$28,197
20	North Myrtle Beach, South Carolina	$27,006
21	Wade Hampton, South Carolina	$26,376
22	Princeton, South Carolina	$25,769
23	Mauldin, South Carolina	$24,750
24	India Hook, South Carolina	$24,693
25	Surfside Beach, South Carolina	$24,445
26	Newport, South Carolina	$24,237
27	Chapin, South Carolina	$24,124
28	Garden City, South Carolina	$24,062
29	Stateburg, South Carolina	$23,617
30	Lexington, South Carolina	$23,416
31	Oswego, South Carolina	$23,379
32	Six Mile, South Carolina	$23,260
33	Greenville, South Carolina	$23,242
34	Myrtle Beach, South Carolina	$23,214
35	Aiken, South Carolina	$23,172
36	Camden, South Carolina	$23,037
37	Meggett, South Carolina	$22,906
38	Quinby, South Carolina	$22,804
39	Due West, South Carolina	$22,758
40	Little River, South Carolina	$22,733
41	Hanahan, South Carolina	$22,629
42	Cameron, South Carolina	$22,463
43	McClellanville, South Carolina	$22,425
44	Charleston, South Carolina	$22,414
45	Seven Oaks, South Carolina	$22,388
46	North Hartsville, South Carolina	$22,376
47	Irmo, South Carolina	$22,312
48	Little Mountain, South Carolina	$22,159
49	Elloree, South Carolina	$21,711
50	Modoc, South Carolina	$21,666
51	Centerville, South Carolina	$21,534
52	Pelzer, South Carolina	$21,518
53	Taylors, South Carolina	$21,463
54	Millwood, South Carolina	$21,426
55	North Augusta, South Carolina	$21,391
56	Oakland, South Carolina	$21,272
57	Springdale, South Carolina	$21,260
58	Simpsonville, South Carolina	$21,139
59	Easley, South Carolina	$20,965
60	Powderville, South Carolina	$20,901
61	Lugoff, South Carolina	$20,883
62	Boiling Springs, South Carolina	$20,814
63	Lake Secession, South Carolina	$20,663
64	Parksville, South Carolina	$20,607
65	Smyrna, South Carolina	$20,575
66	Pomaria, South Carolina	$20,524
67	Fort Mill, South Carolina	$20,519
68	Reidville, South Carolina	$20,511
69	Beaufort, South Carolina	$20,501
70	Mountville, South Carolina	$20,498
71	Florence, South Carolina	$20,336
72	St. Andrews, South Carolina	$20,201
73	Gantt, South Carolina	$20,106
74	Summerville, South Carolina	$20,103
75	Smoaks, South Carolina	$20,097
76	Red Hill, South Carolina	$20,036
77	Dentsville, South Carolina	$19,916
78	Gilbert, South Carolina	$19,909
79	Oak Grove, South Carolina	$19,509
80	Lyman, South Carolina	$19,431
81	Hartsville, South Carolina	$19,318
82	Springfield, South Carolina	$19,285
83	Clemson, South Carolina	$19,272
84	Lesslie, South Carolina	$19,215
85	Blythewood, South Carolina	$19,163
86	Forestbrook, South Carolina	$18,990
87	Rock Hill, South Carolina	$18,929
88	Bethune, South Carolina	$18,879
89	Norway, South Carolina	$18,864
90	Columbia, South Carolina	$18,853
91	Roebuck, South Carolina	$18,682
92	Red Bank, South Carolina	$18,664
93	Anderson, South Carolina	$18,577
94	Pine Ridge, South Carolina	$18,534
95	Seneca, South Carolina	$18,498
96	Woodfield, South Carolina	$18,479
97	Cordova, South Carolina	$18,332
98	Fountain Inn, South Carolina	$18,297
99	Sycamore, South Carolina	$18,297
100	Cope, South Carolina	$18,243
101	Coronaca, South Carolina	$18,219
102	Port Royal, South Carolina	$18,163
103	Spartanburg, South Carolina	$18,136
104	West Columbia, South Carolina	$18,135
105	Nichols, South Carolina	$18,092
106	Socastee, South Carolina	$18,069
107	Greeleyville, South Carolina	$17,971
108	Antreville, South Carolina	$17,961
109	Riverview, South Carolina	$17,930
110	Tatum, South Carolina	$17,926
111	New Ellenton, South Carolina	$17,915
112	Hemingway, South Carolina	$17,888
113	Blenheim, South Carolina	$17,840
114	Lake View, South Carolina	$17,790
115	Gaffney, South Carolina	$17,755
116	Cayce, South Carolina	$17,745
117	Golden Grove, South Carolina	$17,737
118	Barnwell, South Carolina	$17,709
119	Kingstree, South Carolina	$17,694
120	Williams, South Carolina	$17,691
121	Arial, South Carolina	$17,646
122	Honea Path, South Carolina	$17,643
123	Elgin, South Carolina	$17,592
124	Reevesville, South Carolina	$17,555
125	Greer, South Carolina	$17,546
126	Hollywood, South Carolina	$17,521
127	Edisto, South Carolina	$17,500
128	Latta, South Carolina	$17,451
129	Welcome, South Carolina	$17,451
130	Jackson, South Carolina	$17,357
131	Trenton, South Carolina	$17,352
132	Bluffton, South Carolina	$17,327
133	Hampton, South Carolina	$17,326
134	Shell Point, South Carolina	$17,222
135	Silverstreet, South Carolina	$17,184
136	Slater-Marietta, South Carolina	$17,169
137	Valley Falls, South Carolina	$17,162
138	Walterboro, South Carolina	$17,150
139	Westminster, South Carolina	$17,121
140	Olar, South Carolina	$17,113
141	Hickory Grove, South Carolina	$17,014
142	Piedmont, South Carolina	$16,982
143	Belton, South Carolina	$16,970
144	Sumter, South Carolina	$16,949
145	Goose Creek, South Carolina	$16,905
146	Monetta, South Carolina	$16,867
147	Pacolet, South Carolina	$16,856
148	Blacksburg, South Carolina	$16,833
149	Lancaster, South Carolina	$16,828
150	Clover, South Carolina	$16,774
151	Cottageville, South Carolina	$16,765
152	Irwin, South Carolina	$16,673
153	Lowrys, South Carolina	$16,652
154	Pendleton, South Carolina	$16,630
155	Conway, South Carolina	$16,611
156	Wellford, South Carolina	$16,593
157	Elgin, South Carolina	$16,576
158	Marion, South Carolina	$16,551
159	Berea, South Carolina	$16,512
160	Ladson, South Carolina	$16,482
161	Chesterfield, South Carolina	$16,481
162	Mayo, South Carolina	$16,465
163	Ruby, South Carolina	$16,441
164	Holly Hill, South Carolina	$16,437
165	Pickens, South Carolina	$16,436
166	Harleyville, South Carolina	$16,412
167	Paxville, South Carolina	$16,390
168	Kershaw, South Carolina	$16,370
169	Ulmer, South Carolina	$16,363
170	Plum Branch, South Carolina	$16,358
171	Starr, South Carolina	$16,350
172	Belvedere, South Carolina	$16,336
173	Lincolnville, South Carolina	$16,311
174	Union, South Carolina	$16,175
175	Bishopville, South Carolina	$16,140
176	Batesburg-Leesville, South Carolina	$16,078
177	Aynor, South Carolina	$16,076
178	Swansea, South Carolina	$16,007
179	Elko, South Carolina	$15,973
180	Inman Mills, South Carolina	$15,958
181	Monarch Mill, South Carolina	$15,953
182	Campobello, South Carolina	$15,904
183	Burnettown, South Carolina	$15,887
184	Ehrhardt, South Carolina	$15,874
185	McConnells, South Carolina	$15,831
186	Bonneau, South Carolina	$15,799
187	Awendaw, South Carolina	$15,781
188	Lakewood, South Carolina	$15,736
189	Varnville, South Carolina	$15,706
190	Travelers Rest, South Carolina	$15,704
191	Walhalla, South Carolina	$15,691
192	Burton, South Carolina	$15,654
193	Ninety Six, South Carolina	$15,648
194	Shiloh, South Carolina	$15,568
195	South Congaree, South Carolina	$15,543
196	Johnsonville, South Carolina	$15,539
197	Troy, South Carolina	$15,502
198	Ravenel, South Carolina	$15,495
199	Patrick, South Carolina	$15,487
200	Lamar, South Carolina	$15,473
201	Summit, South Carolina	$15,456
202	Darlington, South Carolina	$15,454
203	Inman, South Carolina	$15,416
204	Santee, South Carolina	$15,353
205	Liberty, South Carolina	$15,327
206	Prosperity, South Carolina	$15,323
207	Orangeburg, South Carolina	$15,263
208	Bradley, South Carolina	$15,225
209	Moncks Corner, South Carolina	$15,202
210	Pageland, South Carolina	$15,190
211	Williston, South Carolina	$15,134
212	Dalzell, South Carolina	$15,124
213	Dillon, South Carolina	$15,075
214	Society Hill, South Carolina	$15,005
215	Salem, South Carolina	$14,980
216	Privateer, South Carolina	$14,955
217	St. Matthews, South Carolina	$14,911
218	Clearwater, South Carolina	$14,902
219	Ridgeway, South Carolina	$14,884
220	Mount Croghan, South Carolina	$14,880
221	Cowpens, South Carolina	$14,847
222	Pelion, South Carolina	$14,838
223	Windsor, South Carolina	$14,828
224	Ware Shoals, South Carolina	$14,813
225	West Pelzer, South Carolina	$14,781
226	Iva, South Carolina	$14,756
227	Lynchburg, South Carolina	$14,608
228	Laurens, South Carolina	$14,582
229	Georgetown, South Carolina	$14,568
230	Hodges, South Carolina	$14,564
231	Cherryvale, South Carolina	$14,560
232	Woodruff, South Carolina	$14,535
233	Cane Savannah, South Carolina	$14,529
234	Branchville, South Carolina	$14,509
235	Joanna, South Carolina	$14,500
236	Fort Lawn, South Carolina	$14,463
237	Lake City, South Carolina	$14,452
238	Brunson, South Carolina	$14,431
239	Central, South Carolina	$14,394
240	Newberry, South Carolina	$14,389
241	North Charleston, South Carolina	$14,361
242	Greenwood, South Carolina	$14,347
243	McCormick, South Carolina	$14,338
244	Donalds, South Carolina	$14,333
245	Landrum, South Carolina	$14,259
246	North, South Carolina	$14,237
247	Pamplico, South Carolina	$14,233
248	York, South Carolina	$14,218
249	Clio, South Carolina	$14,215
250	Yemassee, South Carolina	$14,186
251	Waterloo, South Carolina	$14,159
252	Sans Souci, South Carolina	$14,143
253	Winnsboro, South Carolina	$14,135
254	Williamston, South Carolina	$14,085
255	Willington, South Carolina	$14,057
256	Rowesville, South Carolina	$13,978
257	Bennettsville, South Carolina	$13,917
258	Wedgewood, South Carolina	$13,834
259	Dunean, South Carolina	$13,833
260	Norris, South Carolina	$13,825
261	Wagener, South Carolina	$13,805
262	Cheraw, South Carolina	$13,801
263	Sharon, South Carolina	$13,798
264	Loris, South Carolina	$13,779
265	West Union, South Carolina	$13,753
266	Livingston, South Carolina	$13,751
267	Cokesbury, South Carolina	$13,592
268	Gaston, South Carolina	$13,546
269	Buffalo, South Carolina	$13,545
270	Bamberg, South Carolina	$13,512
271	Turbeville, South Carolina	$13,465
272	Whitmire, South Carolina	$13,429
273	Snelling, South Carolina	$13,420
274	Lodge, South Carolina	$13,390
275	St. George, South Carolina	$13,389
276	Chester, South Carolina	$13,386
277	Parker, South Carolina	$13,383
278	Springdale, South Carolina	$13,379
279	Gloverville, South Carolina	$13,314
280	Summerton, South Carolina	$13,284
281	Abbeville, South Carolina	$13,274
282	Great Falls, South Carolina	$13,266
283	Lockhart, South Carolina	$13,263
284	Scotia, South Carolina	$13,202
285	Duncan, South Carolina	$13,194
286	Perry, South Carolina	$13,171
287	Luray, South Carolina	$13,154
288	Jonesville, South Carolina	$13,116
289	Scranton, South Carolina	$13,094
290	Gray Court, South Carolina	$13,066
291	Stuckey, South Carolina	$13,058
292	Richburg, South Carolina	$13,048
293	Peak, South Carolina	$13,033
294	Saluda, South Carolina	$13,032
295	Ward, South Carolina	$13,026
296	East Sumter, South Carolina	$13,010
297	Chesnee, South Carolina	$12,993
298	Judson, South Carolina	$12,979
299	Clinton, South Carolina	$12,933
300	Jefferson, South Carolina	$12,924
301	Utica, South Carolina	$12,909
302	East Gaffney, South Carolina	$12,902
303	Brookdale, South Carolina	$12,852
304	Winnsboro Mills, South Carolina	$12,841
305	McBee, South Carolina	$12,828
306	Homeland Park, South Carolina	$12,787
307	Coward, South Carolina	$12,711
308	Cross Hill, South Carolina	$12,688
309	Laurel Bay, South Carolina	$12,686
310	Johnston, South Carolina	$12,671
311	Startex, South Carolina	$12,619
312	Olanta, South Carolina	$12,606
313	Watts Mills, South Carolina	$12,555
314	Atlantic Beach, South Carolina	$12,492
315	Eutawville, South Carolina	$12,352
316	Southern Shops, South Carolina	$12,268
317	Salley, South Carolina	$12,250
318	Furman, South Carolina	$12,227
319	Mullins, South Carolina	$12,183
320	Woodford, South Carolina	$12,158
321	Andrews, South Carolina	$12,105
322	Ridge Spring, South Carolina	$12,083
323	Saxon, South Carolina	$11,887
324	Blackville, South Carolina	$11,881
325	Eureka Mill, South Carolina	$11,809
326	Hardeeville, South Carolina	$11,795
327	Timmonsville, South Carolina	$11,714
328	Estill, South Carolina	$11,682
329	Central Pacolet, South Carolina	$11,663
330	Bowman, South Carolina	$11,662
331	Promised Land, South Carolina	$11,630
332	Manning, South Carolina	$11,502
333	Neeses, South Carolina	$11,377
334	Hilda, South Carolina	$11,368
335	Wilkinson Heights, South Carolina	$11,360
336	Murphys Estates, South Carolina	$11,358
337	St. Stephen, South Carolina	$11,258
338	Denmark, South Carolina	$11,243
339	Parris Island, South Carolina	$11,216
340	Lowndesville, South Carolina	$11,048
341	Lancaster, South Carolina	$10,896
342	Pinewood, South Carolina	$10,853
343	Bucksport, South Carolina	$10,832
344	Mayesville, South Carolina	$10,738
345	Mulberry, South Carolina	$10,527
346	Allendale, South Carolina	$10,433
347	Calhoun Falls, South Carolina	$10,412
348	Heath Springs, South Carolina	$10,407
349	Gayle Mill, South Carolina	$10,362
350	Clarks Hill, South Carolina	$10,305
351	South Sumter, South Carolina	$10,292
352	Carlisle, South Carolina	$10,190
353	McColl, South Carolina	$10,177
354	Kline, South Carolina	$10,045
355	Lane, South Carolina	$9,963
356	Mount Carmel, South Carolina	$9,777
357	City View, South Carolina	$9,532
358	Rembert, South Carolina	$9,528
359	Eastover, South Carolina	$9,304
360	Ridgeville, South Carolina	$9,186
361	Fairfax, South Carolina	$8,940
362	Govan, South Carolina	$8,834
363	Vance, South Carolina	$8,787
364	Edgefield, South Carolina	$8,125
365	Gifford, South Carolina	$7,602
366	Ridgeland, South Carolina	$7,394
367	Jamestown, South Carolina	$7,021
368	Sellers, South Carolina	$6,325
