= List of census-designated places in South Carolina =

Map of the United States with South Carolina highlighted

Census-designated places (CDPs) are unincorporated communities lacking elected municipal officers and boundaries with legal status. There are 204 census-designated places in South Carolina.

== Census-designated places ==
Place Name	County(ies)^{[A]}	Population (2020)	Area (2020)	Density (2020)
Abney Crossroads	Kershaw County	101	0.46 sq mi (1.18 km^{2})	221.98/sq mi (85.69/km^{2})
Adams Run	Charleston County	421	1.42 sq mi (3.67 km^{2})	297.11/sq mi (114.69/km^{2})
Alcolu	Clarendon County	402	4.57 sq mi (11.84 km^{2})	88.37/sq mi (34.12/km^{2})
Antreville	Abbeville County	147	3.9 sq mi (10.09 km^{2})	37.90/sq mi (14.63/km^{2})
Arcadia	Spartanburg County	3,246	1.96 sq mi (5.09 km^{2})	1,656.12/sq mi (639.33/km^{2})
Arial	Pickens County	2,729	4.59 sq mi (11.89 km^{2})	596.50/sq mi (230.32/km^{2})
Arkwright	Spartanburg County	2,311	2.62 sq mi (6.79 km^{2})	894.35/sq mi (345.30/km^{2})
Arthurtown	Richland County	2,294	1.86 sq mi (4.82 km^{2})	1,232.67/sq mi (476.00/km^{2})
Ashwood	Lee County	116	3.69 sq mi (9.56 km^{2})	32.49/sq mi (12.54/km^{2})
Baxter Village	York County	4,217	1.44 sq mi (3.73 km^{2})	2,965.54/sq mi (1,145.10/km^{2})
Beech Island	Aiken County	1,412	5.02 sq mi (12.99 km^{2})	288.76/sq mi (111.50/km^{2})
Belvedere	Aiken County	5,380	3.43 sq mi (8.88 km^{2})	1,571.72/sq mi (606.82/km^{2})
Ben Avon	Spartanburg County	2,428	1.68 sq mi (4.35 km^{2})	1,453.02/sq mi (561.13/km^{2})
Berea	Greenville County	15,578	7.93 sq mi (20.53 km^{2})	2,023.64/sq mi (781.36/km^{2})
Boiling Springs	Spartanburg County	10,405	6.84 sq mi (17.71 km^{2})	1,521.87/sq mi (587.62/km^{2})
Bonneau Beach	Berkeley County	1,982	2.39 sq mi (6.18 km^{2})	844.84/sq mi (326.25/km^{2})
Boykin	Kershaw County	88	6.9 sq mi (17.87 km^{2})	12.75/sq mi (4.92/km^{2})
Bradley	Greenwood County	160	7.86 sq mi (20.36 km^{2})	20.36/sq mi (7.86/km^{2})
Brookdale	Orangeburg County	3,845	3.65 sq mi (9.44 km^{2})	1,055.74/sq mi (407.65/km^{2})
Browntown	Lee County	206	2.46 sq mi (6.37 km^{2})	83.81/sq mi (32.36/km^{2})
Bucksport	Horry County	745	4.22 sq mi (10.94 km^{2})	177.21/sq mi (68.42/km^{2})
Buffalo	Union County	1,288	4.02 sq mi (10.42 km^{2})	320.24/sq mi (123.66/km^{2})
Buford	Lancaster County	398	2.28 sq mi (5.90 km^{2})	174.56/sq mi (67.41/km^{2})
Burton	Beaufort County	6,777	8.42 sq mi (21.80 km^{2})	811.33/sq mi (313.27/km^{2})
Caesars Head	Greenville County	84	1.47 sq mi (3.81 km^{2})	57.10/sq mi (22.05/km^{2})
Camp Croft	Spartanburg County	2,110	2.66 sq mi (6.89 km^{2})	796.53/sq mi (307.52/km^{2})
Cane Savannah	Sumter County	1,335	3.70 sq mi (9.58 km^{2})	367.77/sq mi (141.98/km^{2})
Capitol View	Richland County	4,653	1.67 sq mi (4.33 km^{2})	2,838.93/sq mi (1,095.99/km^{2})
Carolina Forest	Horry County	23,342	17.29 sq mi (44.77 km^{2})	1,388.17/sq mi (535.97/km^{2})
Cash	Chesterfield County	445	1.52 sq mi (3.95 km^{2})	291.99/sq mi (112.74/km^{2})
Catawba	York County	1,301	10.37 sq mi (26.86 km^{2})	130.48/sq mi (50.38/km^{2})
Cateechee	Pickens County	321	0.52 sq mi (1.35 km^{2})	628.18/sq mi (242.72/km^{2})
Centenary	Marion County	191	0.94 sq mi (2.45 km^{2})	202.12/sq mi (78.06/km^{2})
Centerville	Anderson County	7,185	5.94 sq mi (15.37 km^{2})	1,216.77/sq mi (469.82/km^{2})
Cherokee Falls	Cherokee County	113		
Cherryvale	Sumter County	2,405	1.84 sq mi (4.77 km^{2})	1,329.46/sq mi (513.41/km^{2})
Chickasaw Point	Oconee County	718	3.05 sq mi (7.89 km^{2})	328.60/sq mi (126.85/km^{2})
City View	Greenville County	1,322	0.44 sq mi (1.14 km^{2})	3,011.39/sq mi (1,163.23/km^{2})
Clarks Hill	McCormick County	289	3.2 sq mi (8.28 km^{2})	90.43/sq mi (34.92/km^{2})
Clearwater	Aiken County	4,079	4.31 sq mi (11.17 km^{2})	972.81/sq mi (375.63/km^{2})
Clemson University	Pickens County	7,311		
Clifton	Spartanburg County	544	1.14 sq mi (2.95 km^{2})	506.99/sq mi (195.80/km^{2})
Cokesbury	Greenwood County	212	0.59 sq mi (1.54 km^{2})	356.90/sq mi (137.92/km^{2})
Conestee	Greenville County	904	1.07 sq mi (2.78 km^{2})	851.22/sq mi (328.73/km^{2})
Converse	Spartanburg County	534	0.7 sq mi (1.82 km^{2})	773.91/sq mi (298.73/km^{2})
Coosawhatchie	Jasper County	57	0.60 sq mi (1.55 km^{2})	97.10/sq mi (37.47/km^{2})
Coronaca	Greenwood County	156	1.69 sq mi (4.36 km^{2})	92.91/sq mi (35.88/km^{2})
Cross Anchor	Spartanburg County	116	0.78 sq mi (2.01 km^{2})	149.87/sq mi (57.89/km^{2})
Dacusville	Pickens County	399	2.19 sq mi (5.69 km^{2})	181.78/sq mi (70.18/km^{2})
Dale	Beaufort County	633	2.37 sq mi (6.14 km^{2})	266.86/sq mi (103.04/km^{2})
Dalzell	Sumter County	3,175	5.90 sq mi (15.27 km^{2})	543.01/sq mi (209.64/km^{2})
Danwood	Florence County	453	1.90 sq mi (4.92 km^{2})	238.67/sq mi (92.14/km^{2})
Daufuskie Island	Beaufort County	557	15.75 sq mi (40.78 km^{2})	56.78/sq mi (21.92/km^{2})
Daviston	Marion County	417	1.29 sq mi (3.34 km^{2})	323.51/sq mi (124.94/km^{2})
DeBordieu Colony	Georgetown County	858	4.34 sq mi (11.24 km^{2})	208.25/sq mi (80.42/km^{2})
Dentsville	Richland County	14,431	6.82 sq mi (17.67 km^{2})	2,156.78/sq mi (832.77/km^{2})
Dovesville	Darlington County	827	7.03 sq mi (18.20 km^{2})	118.01/sq mi (45.56/km^{2})
Drayton	Spartanburg County	1,115	1.40 sq mi (3.63 km^{2})	795.29/sq mi (306.99/km^{2})
Dunbar	Georgetown County	615		
Dunean	Greenville County	3,740	1.57 sq mi (4.07 km^{2})	2,380.65/sq mi (919.38/km^{2})
East Camden	Kershaw County	3,215	3.58 sq mi (9.27 km^{2})	898.04/sq mi (346.73/km^{2})
East Gaffney	Cherokee County	2,882	3.03 sq mi (7.85 km^{2})	953.04/sq mi (368.00/km^{2})
East Sumter	Sumter County	1,135	3.32 sq mi (8.60 km^{2})	342.28/sq mi (132.15/km^{2})
Edisto	Orangeburg County	2,058	2.35 sq mi (6.09 km^{2})	875.74/sq mi (337.93/km^{2})
Edmund	Lexington County	969	6.84 sq mi (17.72 km^{2})	141.79/sq mi (54.75/km^{2})
Elgin	Lancaster County	2,357	4.88 sq mi (12.63 km^{2})	485.18/sq mi (187.32/km^{2})
Elliott	Lee County	370	1.86 sq mi (4.82 km^{2})	199.57/sq mi (77.05/km^{2})
Enoree	Spartanburg County	687	1.59 sq mi (4.11 km^{2})	443.51/sq mi (171.24/km^{2})
Eureka Mill	Chester County	1,420	1.26 sq mi (3.26 km^{2})	1,128.78/sq mi (435.77/km^{2})
Fair Play	Oconee County; Anderson County	704	6.79 sq mi (17.59 km^{2})	104.02/sq mi (40.16/km^{2})
Fairforest	Spartanburg County	1,646	2.10 sq mi (5.43 km^{2})	786.81/sq mi (303.84/km^{2})
Fairview Crossroads	Lexington County	540	5.72 sq mi (14.81 km^{2})	94.55/sq mi (36.51/km^{2})
Fingerville	Spartanburg County	174	0.24 sq mi (0.63 km^{2})	713.11/sq mi (274.84/km^{2})
Finklea	Horry County	291	2.69 sq mi (6.98 km^{2})	108.02/sq mi (41.70/km^{2})
Five Forks	Greenville County	17,737	7.61 sq mi (19.72 km^{2})	2,342.76/sq mi (904.58/km^{2})
Floydale	Dillon County	421	2.03 sq mi (5.25 km^{2})	207.59/sq mi (80.16/km^{2})
Forestbrook	Horry County	6,656	3.67 sq mi (9.51 km^{2})	1,813.62/sq mi (700.23/km^{2})
Foreston	Clarendon County	159	2.28 sq mi (5.89 km^{2})	69.86/sq mi (26.98/km^{2})
Fripp Island	Beaufort County	963	4.59 sq mi (11.89 km^{2})	295.31/sq mi (114.03/km^{2})
Gadsden	Richland County	1,301	11.51 sq mi (29.8 km^{2})	113.07/sq mi (43.66/km^{2})
Gantt	Greenville County	15,006	9.80 sq mi (25.39 km^{2})	1,533.42/sq mi (592.08/km^{2})
Garden City	Horry County	10,235	5.45 sq mi (14.11 km^{2})	1,914.87/sq mi (739.33/km^{2})
Gayle Mill	Chester County	866	0.66 sq mi (1.70 km^{2})	1,322.14/sq mi (510.34/km^{2})
Gillisonville	Jasper County	183	1.18 sq mi (3.06 km^{2})	154.82/sq mi (59.76/km^{2})
Glendale	Spartanburg County	244	0.21 sq mi (0.55 km^{2})	1,150.94/sq mi (443.38/km^{2})
Glenn Springs	Spartanburg County	263	2.23 sq mi (5.77 km^{2})	118.63/sq mi (45.81/km^{2})
Gloverville	Aiken County	2,406	3.64 sq mi (9.42 km^{2})	663.18/sq mi (256.02/km^{2})
Golden Grove	Greenville County	3,002	5.85 sq mi (15.15 km^{2})	519.74/sq mi (200.67/km^{2})
Gramling	Spartanburg County	81	1.01 sq mi (2.62 km^{2})	80.68/sq mi (31.15/km^{2})
Graniteville	Aiken County	2,439	3.32 sq mi (8.61 km^{2})	737.53/sq mi (284.79/km^{2})
Green Sea	Horry County	105	1.76 sq mi (4.57 km^{2})	59.52/sq mi (22.99/km^{2})
Grover	Dorchester County	297	2.59 sq mi (6.70 km^{2})	114.80/sq mi (44.32/km^{2})
Hamer	Dillon County	820	5.06 sq mi (13.10 km^{2})	162.67/sq mi (62.80/km^{2})
Harbor Island	Beaufort County	209	1.52 sq mi (3.93 km^{2})	203.51/sq mi (78.58/km^{2})
Helena	Newberry County	870	1.42 sq mi (3.67 km^{2})	613.54/sq mi (236.82/km^{2})
Hilltop	Spartanburg County	3,273	1.82 sq mi (4.73 km^{2})	1,793.42/sq mi (692.49/km^{2})
Homeland Park	Anderson County	6,445	4.72 sq mi (12.22 km^{2})	1,368.66/sq mi (528.46/km^{2})
Homewood	Horry County	1,693	2.07 sq mi (5.36 km^{2})	833.99/sq mi (321.95/km^{2})
Hopkins	Richland County	2,514	16.53 sq mi (42.81 km^{2})	152.29/sq mi (58.80/km^{2})
India Hook	York County	3,817	3.54 sq mi (9.17 km^{2})	1,448.03/sq mi (559.03/km^{2})
Inman Mills	Spartanburg County	1,233	1.08 sq mi (2.80 km^{2})	1,142.72/sq mi (441.02/km^{2})
Irwin	Lancaster County	1,321	2.99 sq mi (7.74 km^{2})	442.55/sq mi (170.85/km^{2})
Islandton	Colleton County	58	2.77 sq mi (7.17 km^{2})	20.95/sq mi (8.09/km^{2})
Jacksonboro	Colleton County	412	14.47 sq mi (37.46 km^{2})	28.47/sq mi (10.99/km^{2})
Joanna	Laurens County	1,517	3.14 sq mi (8.14 km^{2})	483.58/sq mi (186.69/km^{2})
Judson	Greenville County	2,352	0.79 sq mi (2.05 km^{2})	2,988.56/sq mi (1,154.23/km^{2})
Keowee Key	Oconee County	2,716	6.12 sq mi (15.85 km^{2})	783.16/sq mi (302.39/km^{2})
Ketchuptown	Horry County	84	2.71 sq mi (7.02 km^{2})	31.00/sq mi (11.97/km^{2})
La France	Anderson County	476	1.31 sq mi (3.40 km^{2})	367.28/sq mi (141.78/km^{2})
Ladson	Berkeley County; Charleston County	15,550	7.03 sq mi (18.21 km^{2})	2,211.32/sq mi (853.85/km^{2})
Lake Murray of Richland	Richland County	8,110	8.67 sq mi (22.47 km^{2})	1,458.11/sq mi (563.03/km^{2})
Lake Secession	Abbeville County	1,058	7.37 sq mi (19.09 km^{2})	182.23/sq mi (70.36/km^{2})
Lake Wylie	York County	13,655	10.65 sq mi (27.57 km^{2})	1,730.89/sq mi (668.34/km^{2})
Lakewood	Sumter County	2,810	7.70 sq mi (19.94 km^{2})	373.03/sq mi (144.03/km^{2})
Langley	Aiken County	1,485	1.14 sq mi (2.95 km^{2})	1,307.22/sq mi (504.87/km^{2})
Laurel Bay	Beaufort County	5,082	5.05 sq mi (13.09 km^{2})	1,220.46/sq mi (471.19/km^{2})
Lesslie	York County	3,068	6.11 sq mi (15.83 km^{2})	506.02/sq mi (195.36/km^{2})
Litchfield Beach	Georgetown County	8,370	11.69 sq mi (30.29 km^{2})	745.59/sq mi (287.88/km^{2})
Little River	Horry County	11,711	10.82 sq mi (28.03 km^{2})	1,117.57/sq mi (431.49/km^{2})
Little Rock	Dillon County	658	2.46 sq mi (6.37 km^{2})	267.70/sq mi (103.34/km^{2})
Live Oak	Horry County	93	0.84 sq mi (2.18 km^{2})	110.32/sq mi (42.58/km^{2})
Lobeco	Beaufort County	292	2.63 sq mi (6.80 km^{2})	111.24/sq mi (42.94/km^{2})
Longcreek	Oconee County	96	1.92 sq mi (4.97 km^{2})	50.61/sq mi (19.54/km^{2})
Lugoff	Kershaw County	9,900	23.07 sq mi (59.76 km^{2})	438.58/sq mi (169.34/km^{2})
Lydia	Darlington County	572	2.64 sq mi (6.85 km^{2})	216.42/sq mi (83.56/km^{2})
Manville	Lee County	471	2.72 sq mi (7.04 km^{2})	173.23/sq mi (66.88/km^{2})
Mayo	Spartanburg County	1,567	3.04 sq mi (7.88 km^{2})	515.29/sq mi (198.98/km^{2})
Modoc	McCormick County	312	7.17 sq mi (18.57 km^{2})	78.31/sq mi (30.24/km^{2})
Monarch Mill	Union County	1,584	5.61 sq mi (14.54 km^{2})	282.25/sq mi (108.98/km^{2})
Mount Carmel	McCormick County	156	9.19 sq mi (23.8 km^{2})	16.98/sq mi (6.55/km^{2})
Mountville	Laurens County	100	2.87 sq mi (7.45 km^{2})	34.98/sq mi (13.50/km^{2})
Mulberry	Sumter County	540	1.98 sq mi (5.13 km^{2})	274.81/sq mi (106.13/km^{2})
Murphys Estates	Edgefield County	1,719	2.06 sq mi (5.32 km^{2})	837.72/sq mi (323.48/km^{2})
Murrells Inlet	Georgetown County	9,740	7.48 sq mi (19.36 km^{2})	1,331.51/sq mi (514.10/km^{2})
Newport	York County	4,744	8.11 sq mi (21.00 km^{2})	589.39/sq mi (227.55/km^{2})
Newry	Oconee County	199	0.29 sq mi (0.77 km^{2})	674.58/sq mi (260.26/km^{2})
Newtown	Dillon County	770	0.52 sq mi (1.35 km^{2})	1,480.77/sq mi (571.37/km^{2})
North Hartsville	Darlington County	2,775	4.54 sq mi (11.74 km^{2})	612.72/sq mi (236.59/km^{2})
North Santee	Clarendon County	749	11.16 sq mi (28.90 km^{2})	82.24/sq mi (31.76/km^{2})
Northlake	Anderson County	3,818	5.20 sq mi (13.46 km^{2})	922.67/sq mi (356.24/km^{2})
Oak Grove	Lexington County	12,899	7.61 sq mi (19.71 km^{2})	1,700.59/sq mi (656.63/km^{2})
Oakland	Sumter County	1,099	0.69 sq mi (1.78 km^{2})	1,616.18/sq mi (623.81/km^{2})
Olympia	Richland County	1,087	0.76 sq mi (1.96 km^{2})	1,518.16/sq mi (586.40/km^{2})
Oswego	Sumter County	86	1.21 sq mi (3.12 km^{2})	71.37/sq mi (27.55/km^{2})
Parker	Greenville County	13,407	6.90 sq mi (17.88 km^{2})	1,954.94/sq mi (754.77/km^{2})
Pauline	Spartanburg County	209	1.44 sq mi (3.73 km^{2})	146.46/sq mi (56.56/km^{2})
Piedmont	Anderson County; Greenville County	5,411	8.78 sq mi (22.73 km^{2})	629.48/sq mi (243.04/km^{2})
Pimlico	Berkeley County	1,208	0.83 sq mi (2.14 km^{2})	1,760.93/sq mi (679.51/km^{2})
Pine Ridge	Darlington County	807	2.27 sq mi (5.88 km^{2})	355.66/sq mi (137.30/km^{2})
Pinopolis	Berkeley County	982	1.43 sq mi (3.71 km^{2})	685.75/sq mi (264.77/km^{2})
Powdersville	Anderson County	10,025	13.88 sq mi (35.94 km^{2})	728.67/sq mi (281.34/km^{2})
Princeton	Laurens County	49	0.78 sq mi (2.02 km^{2})	62.90/sq mi (24.27/km^{2})
Privateer	Sumter County	1,980	8.23 sq mi (21.3 km^{2})	242.23/sq mi (93.52/km^{2})
Promised Land	Greenwood County	378	1.56 sq mi (4.04 km^{2})	242.46/sq mi (93.59/km^{2})
Rains	Marion County	242	1.34 sq mi (3.46 km^{2})	181.14/sq mi (69.96/km^{2})
Red Bank	Lexington County	10,924	12.76 sq mi (33.05 km^{2})	871.34/sq mi (336.44/km^{2})
Red Hill	Horry County	15,906	11.09 sq mi (28.72 km^{2})	1,444.69/sq mi (557.81/km^{2})
Rembert	Sumter County	246	3.84 sq mi (9.93 km^{2})	64.13/sq mi (24.76/km^{2})
Riverview	York County	1,748	1.25 sq mi (3.25 km^{2})	1,400.64/sq mi (540.98/km^{2})
Roebuck	Spartanburg County	2,357	4.31 sq mi (11.16 km^{2})	549.16/sq mi (212.06/km^{2})
Russellville	Berkeley County	380	3.74 sq mi (9.70 km^{2})	101.50/sq mi (39.18/km^{2})
St. Andrews	Richland County	20,675	6.17 sq mi (15.99 km^{2})	3,362.88/sq mi (1,298.37/km^{2})
St. Charles	Lee County	114	4.24 sq mi (10.97 km^{2})	26.92/sq mi (10.39/km^{2})
Sandy Springs	Anderson County	1,002	2.90 sq mi (7.50 km^{2})	348.89/sq mi (134.69/km^{2})
Sangaree	Berkeley County	7,781	2.03 sq mi (5.26 km^{2})	3,831.12/sq mi (1,478.89/km^{2})
Sans Souci	Greenville County	8,581	3.36 sq mi (8.70 km^{2})	2,591.66/sq mi (1,000.74/km^{2})
Saxon	Spartanburg County	3,896	2.39 sq mi (6.18 km^{2})	1,636.29/sq mi (631.79/km^{2})
Seabrook	Beaufort County	1,255	6.53 sq mi (16.92 km^{2})	228.06/sq mi (88.05/km^{2})
Seven Oaks	Lexington County	14,652	7.77 sq mi (20.11 km^{2})	1,914.79/sq mi (739.32/km^{2})
Sheldon	Beaufort County	579	4.56 sq mi (11.81 km^{2})	127.79/sq mi (49.34/km^{2})
Shell Point	Beaufort County	2,281	5.63 sq mi (14.58 km^{2})	568.40/sq mi (219.45/km^{2})
Shiloh	Sumter County	168	9.78 sq mi (25.34 km^{2})	17.21/sq mi (6.65/km^{2})
Slater-Marietta	Greenville County	2,087	4.31 sq mi (11.17 km^{2})	484.45/sq mi (187.03/km^{2})
Socastee	Horry County	22,213	13.88 sq mi (35.96 km^{2})	1,661.90/sq mi (641.64/km^{2})
South Sumter	Sumter County	1,989	2.38 sq mi (6.16 km^{2})	836.07/sq mi (322.84/km^{2})
South Union	Oconee County	341	2.62 sq mi (6.79 km^{2})	130.95/sq mi (50.57/km^{2})
Southern Shops	Spartanburg County	3,663	3.58 sq mi (9.26 km^{2})	1,027.78/sq mi (396.83/km^{2})
Springdale	Lancaster County	2,492	4.24 sq mi (10.98 km^{2})	589.82/sq mi (227.74/km^{2})
Startex	Spartanburg County	745	1.12 sq mi (2.90 km^{2})	672.99/sq mi (259.73/km^{2})
Stateburg	Sumter County	1,593	4.69 sq mi (12.14 km^{2})	342.14/sq mi (132.09/km^{2})
Tamaseee	Oconee County	60	1.17 sq mi (3.02 km^{2})	51.50/sq mi (19.89/km^{2})
Taylors	Greenville County	23,222	10.60 sq mi (27.46 km^{2})	2,198.84/sq mi (848.98/km^{2})
The Cliffs Valley	Greenville County	736	6.50 sq mi (16.82 km^{2})	113.95/sq mi (44.00/km^{2})
Tigerville	Greenville County	1,244	1.35 sq mi (3.49 km^{2})	936.04/sq mi (361.53/km^{2})
Tradesville	Lancaster County	253	2.01 sq mi (5.20 km^{2})	126.75/sq mi (48.94/km^{2})
Unity	Lancaster County	325	2.12 sq mi (5.49 km^{2})	153.74/sq mi (59.36/km^{2})
Utica	Oconee County	1,347	1.13 sq mi (2.93 km^{2})	1,189.93/sq mi (459.53/km^{2})
Valley Falls	Spartanburg County	8,012	5.22 sq mi (13.51 km^{2})	1,544.63/sq mi (596.43/km^{2})
Wade Hampton	Greenville County	21,482	8.92 sq mi (23.10 km^{2})	2,418.05/sq mi (933.66/km^{2})
Wallace	Marlboro County	843	6.69 sq mi (17.33 km^{2})	128.21/sq mi (49.51/km^{2})
Ware Place	Greenville County	273	0.92 sq mi (2.38 km^{2})	297.71/sq mi (114.90/km^{2})
Warrenville	Aiken County	1,134	1.09 sq mi (2.83 km^{2})	1,046.13/sq mi (403.74/km^{2})
Watts Mills	Laurens County	1,654	2.29 sq mi (5.92 km^{2})	722.90/sq mi (279.17/km^{2})
Wedgefield	Sumter County	1,615	8.59 sq mi (22.26 km^{2})	187.94/sq mi (72.57/km^{2})
Welcome	Greenville County	7,298	4.66 sq mi (12.07 km^{2})	1,582.05/sq mi (610.82/km^{2})
White Knoll	Lexington County	7,858	6.18 sq mi (16.00 km^{2})	1,284.41/sq mi (495.92/km^{2})
Whitney	Spartanburg County	4,409	3.07 sq mi (7.94 km^{2})	1,445.10/sq mi (557.97/km^{2})
Wilkinson Heights	Orangeburg County	1,946	2.99 sq mi (7.74 km^{2})	650.84/sq mi (251.29/km^{2})
Willington	McCormick County	81	6 sq mi (15.53 km^{2})	13.60/sq mi (5.25/km^{2})
Winnsboro Mills	Fairfield County	1,632	2.57 sq mi (6.66 km^{2})	634.77/sq mi (245.06/km^{2})
Wisacky	Lee County	185	5.54 sq mi (14.34 km^{2})	33.43/sq mi (12.91/km^{2})
Woodfield	Richland County	9,199	2.78 sq mi (7.2 km^{2})	3,353.63/sq mi (1,294.83/km^{2})
Wyboo	Clarendon County	3,661	17.38 sq mi (45.02 km^{2})	244.64/sq mi (94.46/km^{2})
Zion	Marion County	136	0.35 sq mi (0.92 km^{2})	383.10/sq mi (148.04/km^{2})

== See also ==
- South Carolina statistical areas
- List of counties in South Carolina
- List of municipalities in South Carolina
- List of unincorporated communities in South Carolina
