= South Carolina's 5th congressional district =

U.S. House district for South Carolina

Coordinates: 34.56°N 80.99°W

- Interactive map of district boundaries since January 3, 2023
- Representative: Ralph Norman; R–Rock Hill
- Population (2025): 800,495
- Median household income: $75,885
- Ethnicity: 64.1% White; 23.8% Black; 5.4% Hispanic; 3.9% Two or more races; 1.9% Asian; 0.8% other
- Cook PVI: R+11

South Carolina's 5th congressional district is a congressional district in northern South Carolina bordering North Carolina. The district includes all of Cherokee, Chester, Fairfield, Kershaw, Lancaster, Lee, Union and York counties and parts of Newberry, Spartanburg and Sumter counties. The bulk of its population lives on the South Carolina side of the Charlotte metropolitan area, including the rapidly growing cities of Rock Hill, Fort Mill, and Lake Wylie. Outside the Charlotte suburbs, the district is mostly rural and agricultural. The district borders were contracted from some of the easternmost counties in the 2012 redistricting.

The district's character is very similar to other mostly rural districts in the South. Democrats still hold most offices outside Republican-dominated York County. However, few of the area's Democrats can be described as liberal by national standards; most are fairly conservative on social issues, but less so on economics. The largest blocs of Republican voters are in the fast-growing Charlotte suburbs, as well as Cherokee County, which shares the Republican tilt of most of the rest of the Upstate. York County is by far the largest county in the district, with almost one-third of its population, and its increasingly Republican bent has pushed the district as a whole into the Republican column in recent years.

In November 2010, the Republican Mick Mulvaney defeated longtime Congressman John Spratt and became the first Republican since Robert Smalls and the end of Reconstruction to represent the district. Following Mulvaney's confirmation as the Director of the Office of Management and Budget, a special election was held in 2017, in which Republican Ralph Norman defeated Democrat Archie Parnell.

From 2003 to 2013 the district included all of Cherokee, Chester, Chesterfield, Darlington, Dillon, Fairfield, Kershaw, Lancaster, Marlboro, Newberry and York counties and parts of Florence, Lee and Sumter counties.

== Composition ==
For the 118th and successive Congresses (based on redistricting following the 2020 census), the district contains all or portions of the following counties and communities:

Cherokee County (6)

All 6 communities

Chester County (7)

All 7 communities

Fairfield County (5)

All 5 communities

Kershaw County (7)

All 7 communities

Lancaster County (10)

All 10 communities

Lee County (8)

All 8 communities

Spartanburg County (6)

Boiling Springs (part; also 4th), Chesnee, Converse (part; also 4th), Cowpens, Fingerville, Mayo

Sumter County (13)

Cane Savannah, Cherryvale, Dalzell, East Sumter (part; also 6th), Mulberry, Oakland, Oswego, Pinewood, Privateer, Rembert, Stateburg, Sumter (part; also 6th), Wedgefield

Union County (6)

All 6 communities

York County (16)

All 16 communities

== Recent election results from statewide races ==
Year	Office	Results
2008	President	McCain 55% - 43%
2012	President	Romney 57% - 43%
2016	President	Trump 58% - 38%
2016	Senate	Scott 60% - 37%
2018	Governor	McMaster 58% - 42%
2018	Secretary of State	Hammond 60% - 40%
2018	Treasurer	Loftis 58% - 39%
2018	Attorney General	Wilson 58% - 40%
2020	President	Trump 58% - 40%
2020	Senate	Graham 57% - 41%
2022	Senate	Scott 65% - 35%
2022	Governor	McMaster 62% - 37%
2022	Secretary of State	Hammond 66% - 34%
2024	President	Trump 61% - 38%
2026	Senate	Andrews 48.89% - 48.58%
2026	Governor	Wilson 52% - 45%

== List of members representing the district ==
Member (Residence)	Party	Years	Cong ress	Electoral history	District location
District established March 4, 1789
Thomas Tudor Tucker (Charleston)	Anti-Administration	March 4, 1789 – March 3, 1793	1st 2nd	Elected in 1788. Re-elected in 1790. Retired.	1789–1793 "Ninety-Six district" South Carolina congressional districts 1st district, "Charleston" 2nd district, "Beaufort-Orangeburg" 3rd district, "Georgetown-Cheraw" 4th district, "Camden" 5th district, "Ninety-Six"
Alexander Gillon (Charleston)	Anti-Administration	March 4, 1793 – October 6, 1794	3rd	Elected in 1793. Died.	1793–1797 "Ninety-Six district"
Vacant		October 6, 1794 – February 9, 1795	3rd		1793–1797 "Ninety-Six district"
Robert Goodloe Harper (Charleston)	Pro-Administration	February 9, 1795 – March 3, 1795	3rd 4th 5th 6th	Elected October 13–14, 1794 to finish Gillon's term and elected the same day to the next term. Re-elected in 1796. Re-elected in 1798. Retired.	1793–1797 "Ninety-Six district"
Robert Goodloe Harper (Charleston)	Federalist	March 4, 1795 – March 3, 1801	3rd 4th 5th 6th	Elected October 13–14, 1794 to finish Gillon's term and elected the same day to the next term. Re-elected in 1796. Re-elected in 1798. Retired.	1793–1797 "Ninety-Six district"
Robert Goodloe Harper (Charleston)	Federalist	March 4, 1795 – March 3, 1801	3rd 4th 5th 6th	Elected October 13–14, 1794 to finish Gillon's term and elected the same day to the next term. Re-elected in 1796. Re-elected in 1798. Retired.	1797–1803 "Ninety-Six district" 1796 election results by district
William Butler (Mount Willing)	Democratic-Republican	March 4, 1801 – March 3, 1803	7th	Elected in 1800. Redistricted to the 2nd district.	1797–1803 "Ninety-Six district" 1796 election results by district
Richard Winn (Winnsboro)	Democratic-Republican	March 4, 1803 – March 3, 1813	8th 9th 10th 11th 12th	Redistricted from the 4th district and re-elected in 1803. Re-elected in 1804. Re-elected in 1806. Re-elected in 1808. Re-elected in 1810. Retired.	1803–1813 "Sumter district"
David R. Evans (Winnsboro)	Democratic-Republican	March 4, 1813 – March 3, 1815	13th	Elected in 1812. Retired.	1813–1823 "Newberry district"
William Woodward (Monticello)	Democratic-Republican	March 4, 1815 – March 3, 1817	14th	Elected in 1814. Lost re-election.	1813–1823 "Newberry district"
Starling Tucker (Mountain Shoals)	Democratic-Republican	March 4, 1817 – March 3, 1823	15th 16th 17th	Elected in 1816. Re-elected in 1818. Re-elected in 1818. Re-elected in 1820. Redistricted to the 9th district.	1813–1823 "Newberry district"
George McDuffie (Willington)	Democratic-Republican (Jackson)	March 4, 1823 – March 3, 1825	18th 19th 20th 21st 22nd 23rd	Redistricted from the 6th district and re-elected in 1823. Re-elected in 1824. Re-elected in 1826. Re-elected in 1828. Re-elected in 1830. Re-elected in 1833. Re-elected in 1834. Resigned to become Governor of South Carolina.	1823–1833 "Edgefield district"
George McDuffie (Willington)	Jacksonian	March 4, 1825 – March 3, 1831	18th 19th 20th 21st 22nd 23rd	Redistricted from the 6th district and re-elected in 1823. Re-elected in 1824. Re-elected in 1826. Re-elected in 1828. Re-elected in 1830. Re-elected in 1833. Re-elected in 1834. Resigned to become Governor of South Carolina.	1823–1833 "Edgefield district"
George McDuffie (Willington)	Nullifier	March 4, 1831 – 1834	18th 19th 20th 21st 22nd 23rd	Redistricted from the 6th district and re-elected in 1823. Re-elected in 1824. Re-elected in 1826. Re-elected in 1828. Re-elected in 1830. Re-elected in 1833. Re-elected in 1834. Resigned to become Governor of South Carolina.	1823–1833 "Edgefield district"
George McDuffie (Willington)	Nullifier	March 4, 1831 – 1834	18th 19th 20th 21st 22nd 23rd	Redistricted from the 6th district and re-elected in 1823. Re-elected in 1824. Re-elected in 1826. Re-elected in 1828. Re-elected in 1830. Re-elected in 1833. Re-elected in 1834. Resigned to become Governor of South Carolina.	1833–1843 [data missing]
Vacant		1834 – December 8, 1834	23rd		1833–1843 [data missing]
Francis W. Pickens (Edgefield)	Nullifier	December 8, 1834 – March 3, 1839	23rd 24th 25th 26th 27th	Elected to finish McDuffie's term. Also elected to the next full term. Re-elected in 1836. Re-elected in 1838. Re-elected in 1840. Retired.	1833–1843 [data missing]
Francis W. Pickens (Edgefield)	Democratic	March 4, 1839 – March 3, 1843	23rd 24th 25th 26th 27th	Elected to finish McDuffie's term. Also elected to the next full term. Re-elected in 1836. Re-elected in 1838. Re-elected in 1840. Retired.	1833–1843 [data missing]
Armistead Burt (Willington)	Democratic	March 4, 1843 – March 3, 1853	28th 29th 30th 31st 32nd	Elected in 1843. Re-elected in 1844. Re-elected in 1846. Re-elected in 1848. Re-elected in 1850. Retired.	1843–1853 [data missing]
James L. Orr (Anderson)	Democratic	March 4, 1853 – March 3, 1859	33rd 34th 35th	Redistricted from the 2nd district and re-elected in 1853. Re-elected in 1854. Re-elected in 1856; Retired.	1853–1860 [data missing]
John D. Ashmore (Anderson)	Democratic	March 4, 1859 – December 21, 1860	36th	Elected in 1858. Re-elected in 1860 but resigned due to Civil War.	1853–1860 [data missing]
District inactive		December 21, 1860 – March 3, 1863	36th 37th	Civil War	
District dissolved March 4, 1863
District re-established March 4, 1875
Robert Smalls (Beaufort)	Republican	March 4, 1875 – March 3, 1879	44th 45th	Elected in 1874. Re-elected in 1876. Lost re-election.	1875–1883 [data missing]
George D. Tillman (Edgefield)	Democratic	March 4, 1879 – July 19, 1882	46th 47th	Elected in 1878. Re-elected in 1880. Lost contested election.	1875–1883 [data missing]
Robert Smalls (Beaufort)	Republican	July 19, 1882 – March 3, 1883	47th	Won contested election. Retired.	1875–1883 [data missing]
John J. Hemphill (Chester)	Democratic	March 4, 1883 – March 3, 1893	48th 49th 50th 51st 52nd	Elected in 1882. Re-elected in 1884. Re-elected in 1886. Re-elected in 1888. Re-elected in 1890. Lost renomination.	1883–1893 [data missing]
Thomas J. Strait (Lancaster)	Democratic	March 4, 1893 – March 3, 1899	53rd 54th 55th	Elected in 1892. Re-elected in 1894. Re-elected in 1896. Lost renomination.	1893–1903 [data missing]
David E. Finley (Yorkville)	Democratic	March 4, 1899 – January 26, 1917	56th 57th 58th 59th 60th 61st 62nd 63rd 64th	Elected in 1898. Re-elected in 1900. Re-elected in 1902. Re-elected in 1904. Re-elected in 1906. Re-elected in 1908. Re-elected in 1910. Re-elected in 1912. Re-elected in 1914. Re-elected in 1916 but died before next term began.	1893–1903 [data missing]
David E. Finley (Yorkville)	Democratic	March 4, 1899 – January 26, 1917	56th 57th 58th 59th 60th 61st 62nd 63rd 64th	Elected in 1898. Re-elected in 1900. Re-elected in 1902. Re-elected in 1904. Re-elected in 1906. Re-elected in 1908. Re-elected in 1910. Re-elected in 1912. Re-elected in 1914. Re-elected in 1916 but died before next term began.	1903–1913 [data missing]
David E. Finley (Yorkville)	Democratic	March 4, 1899 – January 26, 1917	56th 57th 58th 59th 60th 61st 62nd 63rd 64th	Elected in 1898. Re-elected in 1900. Re-elected in 1902. Re-elected in 1904. Re-elected in 1906. Re-elected in 1908. Re-elected in 1910. Re-elected in 1912. Re-elected in 1914. Re-elected in 1916 but died before next term began.	1913–1923 [data missing]
Vacant		January 26, 1917 – February 21, 1917	64th		1913–1923 [data missing]
Paul G. McCorkle (Yorkville)	Democratic	February 21, 1917 – March 3, 1917	64th	Elected to finish Finley's term in the 64th Congress. Retired.	1913–1923 [data missing]
William F. Stevenson (Cheraw)	Democratic	March 4, 1917 – March 3, 1933	65th 66th 67th 68th 69th 70th 71st 72nd	Elected to finish Finley's term in the 65th Congress. Re-elected in 1918. Re-elected in 1920. Re-elected in 1922. Re-elected in 1924. Re-elected in 1926. Re-elected in 1928. Re-elected in 1930. Lost renomination.	1913–1923 [data missing]
William F. Stevenson (Cheraw)	Democratic	March 4, 1917 – March 3, 1933	65th 66th 67th 68th 69th 70th 71st 72nd	Elected to finish Finley's term in the 65th Congress. Re-elected in 1918. Re-elected in 1920. Re-elected in 1922. Re-elected in 1924. Re-elected in 1926. Re-elected in 1928. Re-elected in 1930. Lost renomination.	1923–1933 [data missing]
James P. Richards (Lancaster)	Democratic	March 4, 1933 – January 3, 1957	73rd 74th 75th 76th 77th 78th 79th 80th 81st 82nd 83rd 84th	Elected in 1932. Re-elected in 1934. Re-elected in 1936. Re-elected in 1938. Re-elected in 1940. Re-elected in 1942. Re-elected in 1944. Re-elected in 1946. Re-elected in 1948. Re-elected in 1950. Re-elected in 1952. Re-elected in 1954. Retired.	1933–1943 [data missing]
James P. Richards (Lancaster)	Democratic	March 4, 1933 – January 3, 1957	73rd 74th 75th 76th 77th 78th 79th 80th 81st 82nd 83rd 84th	Elected in 1932. Re-elected in 1934. Re-elected in 1936. Re-elected in 1938. Re-elected in 1940. Re-elected in 1942. Re-elected in 1944. Re-elected in 1946. Re-elected in 1948. Re-elected in 1950. Re-elected in 1952. Re-elected in 1954. Retired.	1943–1953 [data missing]
James P. Richards (Lancaster)	Democratic	March 4, 1933 – January 3, 1957	73rd 74th 75th 76th 77th 78th 79th 80th 81st 82nd 83rd 84th	Elected in 1932. Re-elected in 1934. Re-elected in 1936. Re-elected in 1938. Re-elected in 1940. Re-elected in 1942. Re-elected in 1944. Re-elected in 1946. Re-elected in 1948. Re-elected in 1950. Re-elected in 1952. Re-elected in 1954. Retired.	1953–1963 [data missing]
Robert W. Hemphill (Chester)	Democratic	January 3, 1957 – May 1, 1964	85th 86th 87th 88th	Elected in 1956. Re-elected in 1958. Re-elected in 1960. Re-elected in 1962. Resigned to become Judge of the United States District Court for the District of South Carolina.	1953–1963 [data missing]
Robert W. Hemphill (Chester)	Democratic	January 3, 1957 – May 1, 1964	85th 86th 87th 88th	Elected in 1956. Re-elected in 1958. Re-elected in 1960. Re-elected in 1962. Resigned to become Judge of the United States District Court for the District of South Carolina.	1963–1973 [data missing]
Vacant		May 1, 1964 – November 3, 1964	88th		1963–1973 [data missing]
Thomas S. Gettys (Rock Hill)	Democratic	November 3, 1964 – December 31, 1974	88th 89th 90th 91st 92nd 93rd	Elected to finish Hemphill's term. Also elected to the next full term. Re-elected in 1966. Re-elected in 1968. Re-elected in 1970. Re-elected in 1972. Retired and resigned before next term began.	1963–1973 [data missing]
Thomas S. Gettys (Rock Hill)	Democratic	November 3, 1964 – December 31, 1974	88th 89th 90th 91st 92nd 93rd	Elected to finish Hemphill's term. Also elected to the next full term. Re-elected in 1966. Re-elected in 1968. Re-elected in 1970. Re-elected in 1972. Retired and resigned before next term began.	1973–1983 [data missing]
Kenneth L. Holland (Gaffney)	Democratic	January 3, 1975 – January 3, 1983	94th 95th 96th 97th	Elected in 1974. Re-elected in 1976. Re-elected in 1978. Re-elected in 1980. Retired.	1973–1983 [data missing]
John Spratt (York)	Democratic	January 3, 1983 – January 3, 2011	98th 99th 100th 101st 102nd 103rd 104th 105th 106th 107th 108th 109th 110th 111th	Elected in 1982. Re-elected in 1984. Re-elected in 1986. Re-elected in 1988. Re-elected in 1990. Re-elected in 1992. Re-elected in 1994. Re-elected in 1996. Re-elected in 1998. Re-elected in 2000. Re-elected in 2002. Re-elected in 2004. Re-elected in 2006. Re-elected in 2008. Lost re-election.	1983–1993 [data missing]
John Spratt (York)	Democratic	January 3, 1983 – January 3, 2011	98th 99th 100th 101st 102nd 103rd 104th 105th 106th 107th 108th 109th 110th 111th	Elected in 1982. Re-elected in 1984. Re-elected in 1986. Re-elected in 1988. Re-elected in 1990. Re-elected in 1992. Re-elected in 1994. Re-elected in 1996. Re-elected in 1998. Re-elected in 2000. Re-elected in 2002. Re-elected in 2004. Re-elected in 2006. Re-elected in 2008. Lost re-election.	1993–2003 [data missing]
John Spratt (York)	Democratic	January 3, 1983 – January 3, 2011	98th 99th 100th 101st 102nd 103rd 104th 105th 106th 107th 108th 109th 110th 111th	Elected in 1982. Re-elected in 1984. Re-elected in 1986. Re-elected in 1988. Re-elected in 1990. Re-elected in 1992. Re-elected in 1994. Re-elected in 1996. Re-elected in 1998. Re-elected in 2000. Re-elected in 2002. Re-elected in 2004. Re-elected in 2006. Re-elected in 2008. Lost re-election.	2003–2013 2003 - 2013
Mick Mulvaney (Lancaster)	Republican	January 3, 2011 – February 16, 2017	112th 113th 114th 115th	Elected in 2010. Re-elected in 2012. Re-elected in 2014. Re-elected in 2016. Resigned to become director of the Office of Management and Budget.	2003–2013 2003 - 2013
Mick Mulvaney (Lancaster)	Republican	January 3, 2011 – February 16, 2017	112th 113th 114th 115th	Elected in 2010. Re-elected in 2012. Re-elected in 2014. Re-elected in 2016. Resigned to become director of the Office of Management and Budget.	2013–2023 Static map of 2013-23 congressional district
Vacant		February 16, 2017 – June 20, 2017	115th		2013–2023 Static map of 2013-23 congressional district
Ralph Norman (Rock Hill)	Republican	June 20, 2017 – present	115th 116th 117th 118th 119th	Elected to finish Mulvaney's term. Re-elected in 2018. Re-elected in 2020. Re-elected in 2022. Re-elected in 2024. Retired to run for Governor of South Carolina and later for the U.S. Senate.	2013–2023 Static map of 2013-23 congressional district
Ralph Norman (Rock Hill)	Republican	June 20, 2017 – present	115th 116th 117th 118th 119th	Elected to finish Mulvaney's term. Re-elected in 2018. Re-elected in 2020. Re-elected in 2022. Re-elected in 2024. Retired to run for Governor of South Carolina and later for the U.S. Senate.	2023–2033
Wes Climer (Rock Hill)	Republican	Assuming office on January 3, 2027		Elected in 2026.	2023–2033

== Past election results ==
=== 2012 ===
2012 South Carolina's 5th congressional district election
Party	Candidate	Votes	%
Republican	Mick Mulvaney (incumbent)	154,324	55.5
Democratic	Joyce Knott	123,443	44.4
Write-in		236	0.1
Total votes		278,003	100.0
Republican hold			

=== 2014 ===
2014 South Carolina's 5th congressional district election
Party	Candidate	Votes	%
Republican	Mick Mulvaney (incumbent)	103,078	58.9
Democratic	Tom Adams	71,985	41.1
Write-in		82	0.0
Total votes		175,145	100.0
Republican hold			

=== 2016 ===
2016 South Carolina's 5th congressional district election
Party	Candidate	Votes	%
Republican	Mick Mulvaney (incumbent)	161,669	59.2
Democratic	Fran Person	105,772	38.7
American	Rudy Barnes Jr	5,388	2.0
Write-in		177	0.1
Total votes		273,006	100.0
Republican hold			

=== 2017 special election ===
2017 South Carolina's 5th congressional district special election
Party	Candidate	Votes	%
Republican	Ralph Norman	45,076	51.05%
Democratic	Archie Parnell	42,341	47.94%
American	Josh Thornton	319	0.36%
Libertarian	Victor Kocher	273	0.31%
Green	David Kulma	242	0.27%
Write-In	Write-in	65	0.07%
Total votes		88,316	100.0%
Republican hold			

=== 2018 ===
2018 South Carolina's 5th congressional district election
Party	Candidate	Votes	%
Republican	Ralph Norman (incumbent)	141,757	57.0
Democratic	Archie Parnell	103,129	41.5
Constitution	Michael Chandler	3,443	1.4
Write-in		250	0.1
Total votes		248,579	100.0
Republican hold			

=== 2020 ===
2020 South Carolina's 5th congressional district election
Party	Candidate	Votes	%
Republican	Ralph Norman (incumbent)	220,006	60.1
Democratic	Moe Brown	145,979	39.9
Write-in		273	0.1
Total votes		366,258	100.0
Republican hold			

=== 2022 ===
2022 South Carolina's 5th congressional district election
Party	Candidate	Votes	%
Republican	Ralph Norman (incumbent)	154,725	64.01
Democratic	Evangeline Hundley	83,299	34.46
Green	Larry Gaither	3,547	1.47
Write-in		136	0.06
Total votes		241,707	100%
Republican hold			

=== 2024 ===
South Carolina's 5th congressional district, 2024
Party	Candidate	Votes	%
Republican	Ralph Norman (incumbent)	228,260	63.5
Democratic	Evangeline Hundley	130,592	36.3
Write-in		557	0.2
Total votes		359,409	100.0
Republican hold			

== In popular culture ==
In the first season of House of Cards, protagonist Frank Underwood represents the district in the United States House of Representatives as a Democrat between 1991 and 2013.

== See also ==
- List of United States congressional districts
- South Carolina's congressional districts

U.S. House of Representatives
Preceded by Massachusetts's 7th congressional district	Home district of the speaker of the House; December 7, 1857 – March 3, 1859	Succeeded by New Jersey's 5th congressional district
