= Wedgefield =

Wedgefield may refer to:

- Wedgefield, Western Australia, an industrial area
- Wedgefield, Florida, United States
- Wedgefield, South Carolina, United States
- Wedgefield (CDP), South Carolina, United States
