= The Cliffs Valley, South Carolina =

- Census-designated place
- Location within South Carolina Location within the United States
- Coordinates: 35°08′13″N 82°26′47″W
- Country: United States
- State: South Carolina
- County: Greenville

Area
  - Total: 6.49 sq mi (16.82 km^{2})
  - Land: 6.46 sq mi (16.73 km^{2})
  - Water: 0.039 sq mi (0.10 km^{2})
- Elevation: 1,486 ft (453 m)

Population (2020)
  - Total: 736
  - Density: 110/sq mi (44/km^{2})
- Time zone: UTC-5 (Eastern (EST))
  - Summer (DST): UTC-4 (EDT)
- ZIP Code: 29690 (Travelers Rest)
- Area codes: 864, 821
- FIPS code: 45-71658
- GNIS feature ID: 2812960

The Cliffs Valley is a resort community and census-designated place (CDP) in Greenville County, South Carolina, United States. It was first listed as a CDP prior to the 2020 census with a population of 736.

The CDP is on the northern edge of Greenville County, extending north to the North Carolina border. U.S. Route 25 forms the western edge of the CDP; the highway leads south 21 miles (34 km) to Greenville and north 16 miles (26 km) to Hendersonville, North Carolina.

The community is in the Blue Ridge Mountains and its foothills. 2,900-foot (880 m) Panther Mountain and 3,025-foot (922 m) Corbin Mountain are on the northern border of the CDP, separated by Panther Gap. 2,800-foot (850 m) Pruett Mountain extends south into the middle of the CDP. The community is drained by Terry Creek, which flows south to the North Saluda River just outside the CDP.

== Demographics ==
Historical population
Census	Pop.	Note	%±
2020	736		—
U.S. Decennial Census; 2020

The Cliffs Valley first appeared as a census designated place in the 2020 U.S. census.

=== 2020 census ===
The Cliffs Valley CDP, South Carolina – Demographic Profile (NH = Non-Hispanic)
Race / Ethnicity	Pop 2020	% 2020
White alone (NH)	707	96.06%
Black or African American alone (NH)	5	0.68%
Native American or Alaska Native alone (NH)	0	0.00%
Asian alone (NH)	2	0.27%
Pacific Islander alone (NH)	0	0.00%
Some Other Race alone (NH)	3	0.41%
Mixed Race/Multi-Racial (NH)	12	1.63%
Hispanic or Latino (any race)	7	0.95%
Total	736	100.00%

Note: the US Census treats Hispanic/Latino as an ethnic category. This table excludes Latinos from the racial categories and assigns them to a separate category. Hispanics/Latinos can be of any race.
