= Wedgefield (CDP), South Carolina =

Wedgefield, South Carolina
- CDP
- Location within the state of South Carolina
- Coordinates: 33°53′19″N 80°30′16″W
- Country: United States
- State: South Carolina
- County: Sumter

Area
  - Total: 8.62 sq mi (22.32 km^{2})
  - Land: 8.51 sq mi (22.03 km^{2})
  - Water: 0.11 sq mi (0.29 km^{2})
- Elevation: 210 ft (64 m)

Population (2020)
  - Total: 1,507
  - Density: 177.2/sq mi (68.42/km^{2})
- Time zone: UTC-5 (Eastern (EST))
  - Summer (DST): UTC-4 (EDT)
- FIPS code: 45-75455
- GNIS feature ID: 1852680

Wedgefield is a census-designated place (CDP) in Sumter County, South Carolina, United States. The population was 1,544 at the 2000 census.

== Geography ==
Wedgefield is located at 33°53′19″N 80°30′16″W (33.888476, -80.504541).

According to the United States Census Bureau, the CDP has a total area of 8.5 square miles (22.1 km^{2}), of which 8.4 square miles (21.8 km^{2}) is land and 0.1 square mile (0.3 km^{2}) (1.29%) is water.

== Demographics ==
Historical population
Census	Pop.	Note	%±
2020	1,507		—
U.S. Decennial Census

As of the census of 2000, there were 1,544 people, 547 households, and 410 families residing in the CDP. The population density was 183.2 inhabitants per square mile (70.7/km^{2}). There were 596 housing units at an average density of 70.7 per square mile (27.3/km^{2}). The racial makeup of the CDP was 61.33% White, 35.30% African American, 0.32% Native American, 0.71% Asian, 0.45% from other races, and 1.88% from two or more races. Hispanic or Latino of any race were 1.10% of the population.

There were 547 households, out of which 39.7% had children under the age of 18 living with them, 56.7% were married couples living together, 12.6% had a female householder with no husband present, and 25.0% were non-families. 19.0% of all households were made up of individuals, and 2.9% had someone living alone who was 65 years of age or older. The average household size was 2.82 and the average family size was 3.24.

In the CDP, the population was spread out, with 30.4% under the age of 18, 9.9% from 18 to 24, 34.3% from 25 to 44, 19.6% from 45 to 64, and 5.8% who were 65 years of age or older. The median age was 32 years. For every 100 females, there were 104.0 males. For every 100 females age 18 and over, there were 100.0 males.

The median income for a household in the CDP was $38,333, and the median income for a family was $40,598. Males had a median income of $28,625 versus $20,192 for females. The per capita income for the CDP was $13,834. About 9.4% of families and 14.0% of the population were below the poverty line, including 15.8% of those under age 18 and 13.8% of those age 65 or over.

== See also ==
- Wedgefield, South Carolina
