= Forestbrook, South Carolina =

- Census-designated place
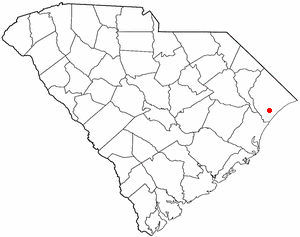
- Location in South Carolina
- Coordinates: 33°43′27″N 78°58′04″W
- Country: United States
- State: South Carolina
- County: Horry

Area
  - Total: 3.67 sq mi (9.51 km^{2})
  - Land: 3.67 sq mi (9.51 km^{2})
  - Water: 0 sq mi (0.00 km^{2})
- Elevation: 23 ft (7.0 m)

Population (2020)
  - Total: 6,656
  - Density: 1,813.6/sq mi (700.23/km^{2})
- Time zone: UTC-5 (Eastern (EST))
  - Summer (DST): UTC-4 (EDT)
- ZIP Code: 29579
- FIPS code: 45-26372
- GNIS feature ID: 2402492

Forestbrook is a census-designated place (CDP) in Horry County, South Carolina, United States. The population was 4,612 at the 2010 census, up from 3,391 at the 2000 census.

== Geography ==
Forestbrook is located in southern Horry County 5 miles (8 km) northwest of Myrtle Beach and 10 miles (16 km) southeast of Conway, the Horry county seat. U.S. Route 501 forms the northeast border of the community, and the northwest border follows South Carolina Highway 31, the Carolina Bays Parkway. The southeast border of the CDP is Socastee Swamp.

According to the United States Census Bureau, the CDP has a total area of 3.7 square miles (9.7 km^{2}), all land.

== Demographics ==
Historical population
Census	Pop.	Note	%±
2000	3,391		—
2010	4,612		36.0%
2020	6,656		44.3%
U.S. Decennial Census

=== 2020 census ===
Forestbrook racial composition
Race	Num.	Perc.
White (non-Hispanic)	5,386	80.92%
Black or African American (non-Hispanic)	400	6.01%
Native American	21	0.32%
Asian	72	1.08%
Pacific Islander	8	0.12%
Other/Mixed	357	5.36%
Hispanic or Latino	412	6.19%

As of the 2020 United States census, there were 6,656 people, 2,528 households, and 1,936 families residing in the CDP.

=== 2000 census ===
As of the census of 2000, there were 3,391 people, 1,277 households, and 994 families residing in the CDP. The population density was 933.1 inhabitants per square mile (360.3/km^{2}). There were 1,358 housing units at an average density of 373.7 per square mile (144.3/km^{2}). The racial makeup of the CDP was 87.91% White, 9.08% African American, 0.38% Native American, 0.94% Asian, 0.56% from other races, and 1.12% from two or more races. Hispanic or Latino of any race were 1.83% of the population.

There were 1,277 households, out of which 39.2% had children under the age of 18 living with them, 63.1% were married couples living together, 11.7% had a female householder with no husband present, and 22.1% were non-families. 15.5% of all households were made up of individuals, and 4.1% had someone living alone who was 65 years of age or older. The average household size was 2.65 and the average family size was 2.96.

In the CDP, the population was spread out, with 26.8% under the age of 18, 7.5% from 18 to 24, 33.4% from 25 to 44, 23.3% from 45 to 64, and 9.0% who were 65 years of age or older. The median age was 36 years. For every 100 females, there were 93.1 males. For every 100 females age 18 and over, there were 90.6 males.

The median income for a household in the CDP was $45,982, and the median income for a family was $48,268. Males had a median income of $27,061 versus $23,164 for females. The per capita income for the CDP was $18,990. About 4.0% of families and 5.0% of the population were below the poverty line, including 7.6% of those under age 18 and 6.3% of those age 65 or over.

== Education ==
Horry County School District is the sole school district in the county.

Area schools:

- Forestbrook Middle School
