= East Gaffney, South Carolina =

- Census-designated place
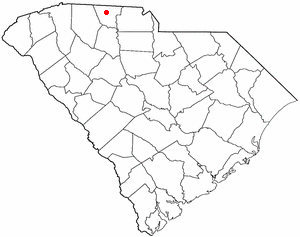
- Location of East Gaffney, South Carolina
- Coordinates: 35°05′06″N 81°37′32″W
- Country: United States
- State: South Carolina
- County: Cherokee

Area
  - Total: 3.03 sq mi (7.85 km^{2})
  - Land: 3.02 sq mi (7.83 km^{2})
  - Water: 0.0077 sq mi (0.02 km^{2})
- Elevation: 758 ft (231 m)

Population (2020)
  - Total: 2,882
  - Density: 950/sq mi (368/km^{2})
- Time zone: UTC-5 (Eastern (EST))
  - Summer (DST): UTC-4 (EDT)
- FIPS code: 45-22075
- GNIS feature ID: 2402428

East Gaffney is a census-designated place (CDP) in Cherokee County, South Carolina, United States. The population was 3,085 at the 2010 United States census.

== Geography ==
East Gaffney is located in central Cherokee County on the eastern border of the city of Gaffney, the county seat. U.S. Route 29 is the main road through the community, leading west into Gaffney and northeast 7 miles (11 km) to Blacksburg. Interstate 85 passes north of the community, with access from Exit 95.

According to the United States Census Bureau, the CDP has a total area of 3.1 square miles (7.9 km^{2}), of which 0.01 square miles (0.02 km^{2}), or 0.24%, is water.

== Demographics ==
Historical population
Census	Pop.	Note	%±
2000	3,349		—
2010	3,085		−7.9%
2020	2,882		−6.6%
U.S. Decennial Census

=== Racial and ethnic composition ===
East Gaffney CDP, South Carolina – Racial and ethnic composition Note: the US Census treats Hispanic/Latino as an ethnic category. This table excludes Latinos from the racial categories and assigns them to a separate category. Hispanics/Latinos may be of any race.
Race / Ethnicity (NH = Non-Hispanic)	Pop 2000	Pop 2010	Pop 2020	% 2000	% 2010	% 2020
White alone (NH)	2,551	2,070	1,687	76.17%	67.10%	58.54%
Black or African American alone (NH)	678	784	797	20.24%	25.41%	27.65%
Native American or Alaska Native alone (NH)	3	2	2	0.09%	0.06%	0.07%
Asian alone (NH)	11	9	8	0.33%	0.29%	0.28%
Native Hawaiian or Pacific Islander alone (NH)	1	1	0	0.03%	0.03%	0.00%
Other race alone (NH)	0	1	10	0.00%	0.03%	0.35%
Mixed race or Multiracial (NH)	19	49	129	0.57%	1.59%	4.48%
Hispanic or Latino (any race)	86	169	249	2.57%	5.48%	8.64%
Total	3,349	3,085	2,882	100.00%	100.00%	100.00%

=== 2000 census ===
As of the census of 2000, there were 3,349 people, 1,380 households, and 916 families residing in the CDP. The population density was 1,058.0 inhabitants per square mile (408.5/km^{2}). There were 1,563 housing units at an average density of 493.8 per square mile (190.7/km^{2}). The racial makeup of the CDP was 77.64% White, 20.39% African American, 0.09% Native American, 0.33% Asian, 0.03% Pacific Islander, 0.87% from other races, and 0.66% from two or more races. Hispanic or Latino of any race were 2.57% of the population.

There were 1,380 households, out of which 28.3% had children under the age of 18 living with them, 41.9% were married couples living together, 18.8% had a female householder with no husband present, and 33.6% were non-families. 27.8% of all households were made up of individuals, and 9.3% had someone living alone who was 65 years of age or older. The average household size was 2.42 and the average family size was 2.96.

In the CDP, the population was spread out, with 24.7% under the age of 18, 9.1% from 18 to 24, 29.3% from 25 to 44, 23.3% from 45 to 64, and 13.6% who were 65 years of age or older. The median age was 36 years. For every 100 females, there were 96.3 males. For every 100 females age 18 and over, there were 91.3 males.

The median income for a household in the CDP was $24,527, and the median income for a family was $32,167. Males had a median income of $26,156 versus $21,009 for females. The per capita income for the CDP was $12,902. About 16.0% of families and 22.6% of the population were below the poverty line, including 28.5% of those under age 18 and 13.0% of those age 65 or over.
