= South Sumter, South Carolina =

- CDP
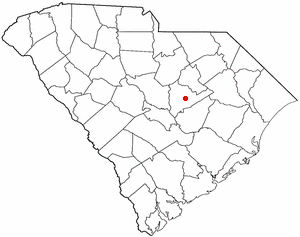
- Location of South Sumter, South Carolina
- Coordinates: 33°52′46″N 80°20′24″W
- Country: United States
- State: South Carolina
- County: Sumter

Area
  - Total: 2.38 sq mi (6.16 km^{2})
  - Land: 2.38 sq mi (6.16 km^{2})
  - Water: 0 sq mi (0.00 km^{2})
- Elevation: 151 ft (46 m)

Population (2020)
  - Total: 1,989
  - Density: 836.2/sq mi (322.84/km^{2})
- Time zone: UTC-5 (Eastern (EST))
  - Summer (DST): UTC-4 (EDT)
- FIPS code: 45-68177
- GNIS feature ID: 2402878

South Sumter is a census-designated place (CDP) in Sumter County, South Carolina, United States. The population was 3,365 at the 2000 census. It is included in the Sumter, South Carolina Metropolitan Statistical Area.

== Geography ==
According to the United States Census Bureau, the CDP has a total area of 2.7 square miles (6.9 km^{2}), all land.

== Demographics ==
Historical population
Census	Pop.	Note	%±
2000	3,365		—
2010	2,411		−28.4%
2020	1,989		−17.5%
U.S. Decennial Census

South Sumter CDP, South Carolina – Racial and ethnic composition Note: the US Census treats Hispanic/Latino as an ethnic category. This table excludes Latinos from the racial categories and assigns them to a separate category. Hispanics/Latinos may be of any race.
Race / Ethnicity (NH = Non-Hispanic)	Pop 2000	Pop 2010	Pop 2020	% 2000	% 2010	% 2020
White alone (NH)	298	202	187	8.86%	8.38%	9.40%
Black or African American alone (NH)	3,012	2,127	1,703	89.51%	88.22%	85.62%
Native American or Alaska Native alone (NH)	7	5	7	0.21%	0.21%	0.35%
Asian alone (NH)	0	0	0	0.00%	0.00%	0.00%
Pacific Islander alone (NH)	0	3	2	0.00%	0.12%	0.10%
Other race alone (NH)	0	5	0	0.00%	0.21%	0.00%
Mixed race or Multiracial (NH)	18	15	28	0.53%	0.62%	1.41%
Hispanic or Latino (any race)	30	54	62	0.89%	2.24%	3.12%
Total	3,365	2,411	1,989	100.00%	100.00%	100.00%

=== 2000 census ===
As of the census of 2000, there were 3,365 people, 1,196 households, and 851 families residing in the CDP. The population density was 1,266.0 inhabitants per square mile (488.8/km^{2}). There were 1,395 housing units at an average density of 524.9 per square mile (202.7/km^{2}). The racial makeup of the CDP was 8.95% White, 89.93% African American, 0.21% Native American, 0.15% from other races, and 0.77% from two or more races. Hispanic or Latino of any race were 0.89% of the population.

There were 1,196 households, out of which 30.6% had children under the age of 18 living with them, 32.8% were married couples living together, 31.3% had a female householder with no husband present, and 28.8% were non-families. 24.9% of all households were made up of individuals, and 10.3% had someone living alone who was 65 years of age or older. The average household size was 2.79 and the average family size was 3.35.

In the CDP, the population was spread out, with 29.7% under the age of 18, 8.6% from 18 to 24, 25.5% from 25 to 44, 22.5% from 45 to 64, and 13.7% who were 65 years of age or older. The median age was 35 years. For every 100 females, there were 85.2 males. For every 100 females age 18 and over, there were 77.2 males.

The median income for a household in the CDP was $23,339, and the median income for a family was $24,939. Males had a median income of $26,425 versus $17,077 for females. The per capita income for the CDP was $10,292. About 21.8% of families and 24.9% of the population were below the poverty line, including 30.9% of those under age 18 and 31.4% of those age 65 or over.
