= Lakewood, South Carolina =

- CDP
- Location within the state of South Carolina
- Coordinates: 33°51′32″N 80°21′03″W
- Country: United States
- State: South Carolina
- County: Sumter

Area
  - Total: 7.70 sq mi (19.94 km^{2})
  - Land: 7.53 sq mi (19.51 km^{2})
  - Water: 0.17 sq mi (0.43 km^{2})
- Elevation: 174 ft (53 m)

Population (2020)
  - Total: 2,810
  - Density: 373.0/sq mi (144.03/km^{2})
- Time zone: UTC-5 (Eastern (EST))
  - Summer (DST): UTC-4 (EDT)
- FIPS code: 45-39772
- GNIS feature ID: 2403215

Lakewood is a census-designated place (CDP) in Sumter County, South Carolina, United States. The population was 2,603 at the 2000 census. It is included in the Sumter, South Carolina Metropolitan Statistical Area.

== Geography ==
According to the United States Census Bureau, the CDP has a total area of 7.8 square miles (20 km^{2}), of which 7.6 square miles (20 km^{2}) is land and 0.2 square miles (0.52 km^{2}) (2.44%) is water.

== Demographics ==
Historical population
Census	Pop.	Note	%±
2020	2,810		—
U.S. Decennial Census

As of the census of 2000, there were 2,603 people, 953 households, and 742 families residing in the CDP. The population density was 343.0 inhabitants per square mile (132.4/km^{2}). There were 1,033 housing units at an average density of 136.1 per square mile (52.5/km^{2}). The racial makeup of the CDP was 66.31% White, 31.43% African American, 0.12% Native American, 0.19% Asian, 0.04% Pacific Islander, 0.65% from other races, and 1.27% from two or more races. Hispanic or Latino of any race were 1.04% of the population.

There were 953 households, out of which 38.3% had children under the age of 18 living with them, 54.6% were married couples living together, 17.9% had a female householder with no husband present, and 22.1% were non-families. 19.0% of all households were made up of individuals, and 5.5% had someone living alone who was 65 years of age or older. The average household size was 2.73 and the average family size was 3.10.

In the CDP, the population was spread out, with 28.1% under the age of 18, 9.1% from 18 to 24, 30.4% from 25 to 44, 23.9% from 45 to 64, and 8.5% who were 65 years of age or older. The median age was 34 years. For every 100 females, there were 93.2 males. For every 100 females age 18 and over, there were 94.5 males.

The median income for a household in the CDP was $35,417, and the median income for a family was $39,868. Males had a median income of $28,438 versus $19,375 for females. The per capita income for the CDP was $15,736. About 11.5% of families and 12.0% of the population were below the poverty line, including 14.2% of those under age 18 and 14.9% of those age 65 or over.
