= Startex, South Carolina =

- CDP
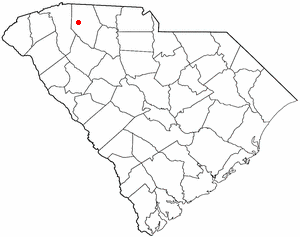
- Location of Startex, South Carolina
- Coordinates: 34°55′49″N 82°05′34″W
- Country: United States
- State: South Carolina
- County: Spartanburg

Area
  - Total: 1.12 sq mi (2.90 km^{2})
  - Land: 1.11 sq mi (2.87 km^{2})
  - Water: 0.012 sq mi (0.03 km^{2})
- Elevation: 837 ft (255 m)

Population (2020)
  - Total: 745
  - Density: 672.7/sq mi (259.73/km^{2})
- Time zone: UTC-5 (Eastern (EST))
  - Summer (DST): UTC-4 (EDT)
- ZIP code: 29377
- Area codes: 864, 821
- FIPS code: 45-68920
- GNIS feature ID: 2402894

Startex is a census-designated place (CDP) in Spartanburg County, South Carolina, United States. The population was 859 at the 2010 census. The area was originally known as Tucapau, named after the mill that was built there in 1896. In 1936, Walter Montgomery Sr. bought the mill and changed its name to Startex—the brand name of household textiles produced at the plant. The mill ceased operations in 1998 and was mostly dismantled in 1999.

== Geography ==
According to the United States Census Bureau, the CDP has a total area of 1.9 square miles (4.9 km^{2}), all land.

== Demographics ==
Historical population
Census	Pop.	Note	%±
2020	745		—
U.S. Decennial Census

As of the census of 2000, there were 988 people, 391 households, and 265 families residing in the CDP. The population density was 516.1 inhabitants per square mile (199.3/km^{2}). There were 443 housing units at an average density of 231.4 per square mile (89.3/km^{2}). The racial makeup of the CDP was 87.55% White, 11.54% African American, 0.40% Asian, 0.51% from other races. Hispanic or Latino of any race were 2.13% of the population.

There were 391 households, out of which 29.2% had children under the age of 18 living with them, 49.4% were married couples living together, 11.3% had a female householder with no husband present, and 32.2% were non-families. 28.4% of all households were made up of individuals, and 11.5% had someone living alone who was 65 years of age or older. The average household size was 2.53 and the average family size was 3.12.

In the CDP, the population was spread out, with 25.8% under the age of 18, 6.1% from 18 to 24, 29.6% from 25 to 44, 24.0% from 45 to 64, and 14.6% who were 65 years of age or older. The median age was 37 years. For every 100 females, there were 97.6 males. For every 100 females age 18 and over, there were 90.9 males.

The median income for a household in the CDP was $30,417, and the median income for a family was $38,036. Males had a median income of $24,821 versus $22,143 for females. The per capita income for the CDP was $12,619. About 7.5% of families and 13.8% of the population were below the poverty line, including 10.8% of those under age 18 and 20.9% of those age 65 or over.
