= Springdale, Lancaster County, South Carolina =

Springdale
- Census-designated place
- Location in South Carolina Location in the United States
- Coordinates: 34°41′26″N 80°47′05″W
- Country: United States
- State: South Carolina
- County: Lancaster

Area
  - Total: 4.24 sq mi (10.98 km^{2})
  - Land: 4.22 sq mi (10.94 km^{2})
  - Water: 0.015 sq mi (0.04 km^{2})
- Elevation: 558 ft (170 m)

Population (2020)
  - Total: 2,492
  - Density: 589.8/sq mi (227.74/km^{2})
- Time zone: UTC-5 (Eastern (EST))
  - Summer (DST): UTC-4 (EDT)
- FIPS code: 45-68380
- GNIS feature ID: 2402890

Springdale is an unincorporated community and census-designated place (CDP) in Lancaster County, South Carolina, United States. The population was 2,574 at the 2010 census, down from 2,864 at the 2000 census.

== Geography ==
Springdale is located in west-central Lancaster County. It is bordered to the north by Lancaster, the county seat, and to the west by unincorporated Irwin.

South Carolina Highway 200 (Great Falls Highway) passes through the center of the Springdale CDP, which includes Crockett Crossroad near the CDP's center. Highway 200 leads northeast 2.5 miles (4.0 km) to the center of Lancaster and southwest 11 miles (18 km) to Great Falls.

According to the United States Census Bureau, the Springdale CDP has a total area of 4.2 square miles (11.0 km^{2}), of which 0.02 square miles (0.04 km^{2}), or 0.37%, are water. The community drains north to Bear Creek and south to Rum Creek, both northwest-flowing tributaries of Cane Creek and part of the Catawba River watershed.

== Demographics ==
Historical population
Census	Pop.	Note	%±
2020	2,492		—
U.S. Decennial Census

As of the census of 2000, there were 2,864 people, 1,096 households, and 737 families residing in the CDP. The population density was 678.6 inhabitants per square mile (262.0/km^{2}). There were 1,175 housing units at an average density of 278.4 per square mile (107.5/km^{2}). The racial makeup of the CDP was 64.73% White, 26.26% African American, 0.21% Native American, 0.24% Asian, 0.14% Pacific Islander, 7.65% from other races, and 0.77% from two or more races. Hispanic or Latino of any race were 9.39% of the population.

There were 1,096 households, out of which 31.5% had children under the age of 18 living with them, 43.1% were married couples living together, 17.5% had a female householder with no husband present, and 32.7% were non-families. 25.7% of all households were made up of individuals, and 11.0% had someone living alone who was 65 years of age or older. The average household size was 2.60 and the average family size was 3.03.

In the CDP, the population was spread out, with 25.4% under the age of 18, 10.4% from 18 to 24, 31.1% from 25 to 44, 20.3% from 45 to 64, and 12.7% who were 65 years of age or older. The median age was 33 years. For every 100 females, there were 100.8 males. For every 100 females age 18 and over, there were 99.8 males.

The median income for a household in the CDP was $30,077, and the median income for a family was $32,798. Males had a median income of $26,379 versus $20,417 for females. The per capita income for the CDP was $13,379. About 8.9% of families and 10.7% of the population were below the poverty line, including 12.1% of those under age 18 and 13.6% of those age 65 or over.
