= Northlake, South Carolina =

Northlake
- CDP
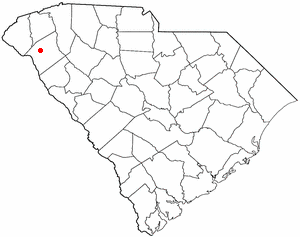
- Location of Northlake, South Carolina
- Coordinates: 34°34′09″N 82°41′02″W
- Country: United States
- State: South Carolina
- County: Anderson

Area
  - Total: 5.20 sq mi (13.46 km^{2})
  - Land: 4.14 sq mi (10.72 km^{2})
  - Water: 1.06 sq mi (2.74 km^{2})
- Elevation: 659 ft (201 m)

Population (2020)
  - Total: 3,818
  - Density: 922.7/sq mi (356.24/km^{2})
- Time zone: UTC-5 (Eastern (EST))
  - Summer (DST): UTC-4 (EDT)
- FIPS code: 45-51180
- GNIS feature ID: 2403358

Northlake is a census-designated place (CDP) in Anderson County, South Carolina. The population was 3,818 at the 2020 census.

== Geography ==
Northlake is a suburban area located in central Anderson County bordering the north side of Anderson, the county seat. The CDP is on both sides of an arm of Lake Hartwell, a large reservoir and recreation area. Interstate 85 forms the northern boundary of the CDP, leading northeast 27 miles (43 km) to Greenville and southwest 120 miles (190 km) to Atlanta. Exits 19 (U.S. Route 76) and 21 (U.S. Route 178) serve the community.

According to the United States Census Bureau, the CDP has a total area of 5.2 square miles (13.4 km^{2}), of which 4.1 square miles (10.7 km^{2}) is land and 1.0 square mile (2.7 km^{2}), or 20.42%, is water. Darwin Wright Park, a City of Anderson recreation area, provides access within the CDP to Lake Hartwell on its arm formed by Six and Twenty Creek.

== Demographics ==
Historical population
Census	Pop.	Note	%±
2000	3,659		—
2010	3,745		2.4%
2020	3,818		1.9%
U.S. Decennial Census

=== 2020 census ===
As of the 2020 census, Northlake had a population of 3,818. The median age was 46.7 years. 19.0% of residents were under the age of 18 and 23.1% of residents were 65 years of age or older. For every 100 females there were 97.2 males, and for every 100 females age 18 and over there were 94.8 males age 18 and over.

99.9% of residents lived in urban areas, while 0.1% lived in rural areas.

There were 1,670 households in Northlake, of which 23.2% had children under the age of 18 living in them. Of all households, 54.5% were married-couple households, 17.5% were households with a male householder and no spouse or partner present, and 24.0% were households with a female householder and no spouse or partner present. About 27.8% of all households were made up of individuals and 13.4% had someone living alone who was 65 years of age or older.

There were 1,893 housing units, of which 11.8% were vacant. The homeowner vacancy rate was 3.2% and the rental vacancy rate was 15.0%.

Northlake racial composition
Race	Num.	Perc.
White (non-Hispanic)	3,121	81.74%
Black or African American (non-Hispanic)	366	9.59%
Native American	3	0.08%
Asian	87	2.28%
Pacific Islander	2	0.05%
Other/Mixed	143	3.75%
Hispanic or Latino	96	2.51%

=== 2000 census ===
As of the census of 2000, there were 3,659 people, 1,611 households, and 1,089 families residing in the CDP. The population density was 862.7 inhabitants per square mile (333.1/km^{2}). There were 1,775 housing units at an average density of 418.5 per square mile (161.6/km^{2}). The racial makeup of the CDP was 90.90% White, 6.81% African American, 0.16% Native American, 1.28% Asian, 0.16% from other races, and 0.68% from two or more races. Hispanic or Latino of any race were 0.52% of the population.

There were 1,611 households, out of which 24.6% had children under the age of 18 living with them, 59.7% were married couples living together, 5.5% had a female householder with no husband present, and 32.4% were non-families. 28.5% of all households were made up of individuals, and 7.7% had someone living alone who was 65 years of age or older. The average household size was 2.26 and the average family size was 2.78.

In the CDP, the population was spread out, with 19.9% under the age of 18, 7.8% from 18 to 24, 28.3% from 25 to 44, 28.5% from 45 to 64, and 15.5% who were 65 years of age or older. The median age was 41 years. For every 100 females, there were 97.5 males. For every 100 females age 18 and over, there were 97.1 males.

The median income for a household in the CDP was $51,371, and the median income for a family was $62,415. Males had a median income of $44,236 versus $30,125 for females. The per capita income for the CDP was $28,912. About 1.4% of families and 3.2% of the population were below the poverty line, including 1.5% of those under age 18 and 4.7% of those age 65 or over.
