= Irwin, South Carolina =

- Census-designated place
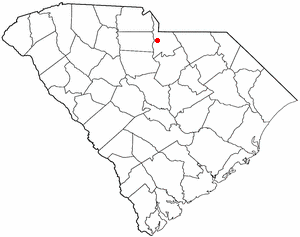
- Location of Irwin, South Carolina
- Coordinates: 34°41′39″N 80°49′11″W
- Country: United States
- State: South Carolina
- County: Lancaster

Area
  - Total: 2.99 sq mi (7.74 km^{2})
  - Land: 2.98 sq mi (7.73 km^{2})
  - Water: 0.0039 sq mi (0.01 km^{2})
- Elevation: 502 ft (153 m)

Population (2020)
  - Total: 1,321
  - Density: 442.5/sq mi (170.85/km^{2})
- Time zone: UTC-5 (Eastern (EST))
  - Summer (DST): UTC-4 (EDT)
- ZIP code: 29720
- Area code: 803
- FIPS code: 45-35980
- GNIS feature ID: 2402622

Irwin is an unincorporated community and census-designated place (CDP) in Lancaster County, South Carolina, United States. The population was 1,405 at the 2010 census.

Irwin is known for its small mill homes. This was a thriving community in Lancaster County when the Springs Industries was a thriving business from 1950 to 2002.

== Geography ==
Irwin is located in western Lancaster County. It is bordered to the east by Springdale, and Lancaster, the county seat, is 4 miles (6 km) to the northeast. The Irwin CDP includes the neighborhood of Gooch Crossroad. Cane Creek forms the northern border of the CDP, and Rum Creek, a tributary of Cane Creek, forms the southern border.

According to the United States Census Bureau, the CDP has a total area of 3.0 square miles (7.7 km^{2}), of which 0.004 square miles (0.01 km^{2}), or 0.01%, are water. Via Cane Creek, Irwin is part of the Catawba River watershed.

== Demographics ==
Historical population
| Census | Pop. | Note | %± |
|---|---|---|---|
| 2020 | 1,321 | | — |
U.S. Decennial Census

As of the census of 2000, there were 1,343 people, 528 households, and 400 families residing in the CDP. The population density was 450.3 inhabitants per square mile (173.9/km^{2}). There were 554 housing units at an average density of 185.7 per square mile (71.7/km^{2}). The racial makeup of the CDP was 77.29% White, 21.00% African American, 0.30% Native American, 0.45% from other races, and 0.97% from two or more races. Hispanic or Latino of any race were 1.27% of the population.

There were 528 households, out of which 31.6% had children under the age of 18 living with them, 58.1% were married couples living together, 12.9% had a female householder with no husband present, and 24.2% were non-families. 20.5% of all households were made up of individuals, and 9.8% had someone living alone who was 65 years of age or older. The average household size was 2.54 and the average family size was 2.90.

In the CDP, the population was spread out, with 24.6% under the age of 18, 7.9% from 18 to 24, 28.4% from 25 to 44, 22.6% from 45 to 64, and 16.4% who were 65 years of age or older. The median age was 37 years. For every 100 females, there were 89.2 males. For every 100 females age 18 and over, there were 86.0 males.

The median income for a household in the CDP was $42,083, and the median income for a family was $45,625. Males had a median income of $28,750 versus $22,167 for females. The per capita income for the CDP was $16,673. About 6.6% of families and 6.5% of the population were below the poverty line, including 11.3% of those under age 18 and 9.7% of those age 65 or over.
