= Elgin, Lancaster County, South Carolina =

Elgin
- Census-designated place
- Location in South Carolina Location in the United States
- Coordinates: 34°40′23″N 80°44′15″W
- Country: United States
- State: South Carolina
- County: Lancaster

Area
  - Total: 4.88 sq mi (12.63 km^{2})
  - Land: 4.86 sq mi (12.58 km^{2})
  - Water: 0.015 sq mi (0.04 km^{2})
- Elevation: 633 ft (193 m)

Population (2020)
  - Total: 2,357
  - Density: 485.2/sq mi (187.32/km^{2})
- Time zone: UTC-5 (Eastern (EST))
  - Summer (DST): UTC-4 (EDT)
- ZIP code: 29720
- FIPS code: 45-23290
- GNIS feature ID: 2402449

Elgin is an unincorporated community and census-designated place (CDP) in Lancaster County, South Carolina, United States. The population was 2,607 at the 2010 census.

== Geography ==
Elgin is located in central Lancaster County along U.S. Route 521. It is 4 miles (6 km) southeast of Lancaster, the county seat, and 6 miles (10 km) northwest of Heath Springs.

According to the United States Census Bureau, the CDP has a total area of 4.9 square miles (12.6 km^{2}), of which 0.02 square miles (0.04 km^{2}), or 0.35%, are water. The community drains west to Turkey Quarter Creek and east to Dry Branch, both of which flow northwesterly to Bear Creek, a tributary of Cane Creek and then the Catawba River.

== Demographics ==
Historical population
Census	Pop.	Note	%±
2020	2,357		—
U.S. Decennial Census

As of the census of 2000, there were 2,426 people, 926 households, and 725 families residing in the CDP. The population density was 494.7 inhabitants per square mile (191.0/km^{2}). There were 976 housing units at an average density of 199.0 per square mile (76.8/km^{2}). The racial makeup of the CDP was 78.65% White, 19.91% African American, 0.29% Native American, 0.21% Asian, 0.37% from other races, and 0.58% from two or more races. Hispanic or Latino of any race were 0.62% of the population.

There were 926 households, out of which 39.8% had children under the age of 18 living with them, 59.9% were married couples living together, 15.6% had a female householder with no husband present, and 21.6% were non-families. 18.5% of all households were made up of individuals, and 5.4% had someone living alone who was 65 years of age or older. The average household size was 2.62 and the average family size was 2.96.

In the CDP, the population was spread out, with 26.9% under the age of 18, 8.0% from 18 to 24, 32.7% from 25 to 44, 24.6% from 45 to 64, and 7.7% who were 65 years of age or older. The median age was 35 years. For every 100 females, there were 93.0 males. For every 100 females age 18 and over, there were 90.0 males.

The median income for a household in the CDP was $45,391, and the median income for a family was $48,485. Males had a median income of $35,893 versus $21,512 for females. The per capita income for the CDP was $16,576. About 6.5% of families and 9.7% of the population were below the poverty line, including 13.6% of those under age 18 and 19.7% of those age 65 or over.
