= Mayo, South Carolina =

- CDP
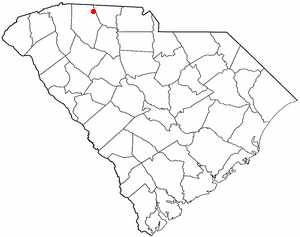
- Location of Mayo, South Carolina
- Coordinates: 35°05′20″N 81°51′54″W
- Country: United States
- State: South Carolina
- County: Spartanburg

Area
  - Total: 3.04 sq mi (7.88 km^{2})
  - Land: 3.04 sq mi (7.88 km^{2})
  - Water: 0 sq mi (0.00 km^{2})
- Elevation: 879 ft (268 m)

Population (2020)
  - Total: 1,567
  - Density: 515.4/sq mi (198.98/km^{2})
- Time zone: UTC−5 (Eastern (EST))
  - Summer (DST): UTC−4 (EDT)
- ZIP code: 29368
- Area codes: 864, 821
- FIPS code: 45-45430
- GNIS feature ID: 2403266

Mayo is a census-designated place (CDP) in Spartanburg County, South Carolina, United States. The population was 1,592 at the 2010 census.

== Geography ==
According to the United States Census Bureau, the CDP has a total area of 3.1 square miles (8.0 km^{2}), all land.

== Demographics ==
Historical population
Census	Pop.	Note	%±
2020	1,567		—
U.S. Decennial Census

As of the census of 2000, there were 1,842 people, 719 households, and 532 families residing in the CDP. The population density was 590.6 people per square mile (228.0 people/km^{2}). There were 773 housing units at an average density of 247.9 per square mile (95.7/km^{2}). The racial makeup of the CDP was 97.29% White, 1.30% African American, 0.33% Native American, 0.49% Asian, 0.22% from other races, and 0.38% from two or more races. Hispanic or Latino of any race were 1.25% of the population.

There were 719 households, out of which 31.7% had children under the age of 18 living with them, 57.4% were married couples living together, 11.0% had a female householder with no husband present, and 26.0% were non-families. 22.4% of all households were made up of individuals, and 8.3% had someone living alone who was 65 years of age or older. The average household size was 2.56 and the average family size was 2.99.

In the CDP, the population was spread out, with 24.7% under the age of 18, 8.5% from 18 to 24, 30.5% from 25 to 44, 24.2% from 45 to 64, and 12.1% who were 65 years of age or older. The median age was 37 years. For every 100 females, there were 97.6 males. For every 100 females age 18 and over, there were 91.0 males.

The median income for a household in the CDP was $41,563, and the median income for a family was $47,045. Males had a median income of $31,997 versus $25,027 for females. The per capita income for the CDP was $16,465. About 9.7% of families and 12.8% of the population were below the poverty line, including 15.5% of those under age 18 and 11.0% of those age 65 or over.

== Education ==
It is in Spartanburg County School District 2.
