= Cherryvale, South Carolina =

- CDP
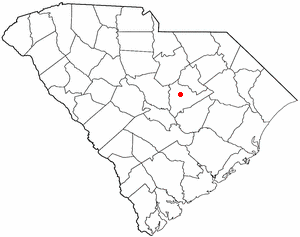
- Location of Cherryvale, South Carolina
- Coordinates: 33°57′15″N 80°27′39″W
- Country: United States
- State: South Carolina
- County: Sumter

Area
  - Total: 1.84 sq mi (4.77 km^{2})
  - Land: 1.81 sq mi (4.68 km^{2})
  - Water: 0.031 sq mi (0.08 km^{2})
- Elevation: 213 ft (65 m)

Population (2020)
  - Total: 2,405
  - Density: 1,329.7/sq mi (513.41/km^{2})
- Time zone: UTC-5 (Eastern (EST))
  - Summer (DST): UTC-4 (EDT)
- ZIP code: 29154
- Area code: 803
- FIPS code: 45-14018
- GNIS feature ID: 2402768

Cherryvale is a census-designated place (CDP) in Sumter County, South Carolina, United States. The population was 2,461 at the 2000 census. It is included in the Sumter, South Carolina Metropolitan Statistical Area.

== Geography ==
According to the United States Census Bureau, the CDP has a total area of 1.8 square miles (4.7 km^{2}), of which 1.8 square miles (4.7 km^{2}) is land and 0.04 square miles (0.10 km^{2}) (1.67%) is water.

== Demographics ==
Historical population
Census	Pop.	Note	%±
2020	2,405		—
U.S. Decennial Census

As of the census of 2000, there were 2,461 people, 982 households, and 591 families residing in the CDP. The population density was 1,390.9 inhabitants per square mile (537.0/km^{2}). There were 1,309 housing units at an average density of 739.8 per square mile (285.6/km^{2}). The racial makeup of the CDP was 48.64% White, 47.66% African American, 0.37% Native American, 1.06% Asian, 1.18% from other races, and 1.10% from two or more races. Hispanic or Latino of any race were 1.95% of the population.

There were 982 households, out of which 35.6% had children under the age of 18 living with them, 34.0% were married couples living together, 19.0% had a female householder with no husband present, and 39.8% were non-families. 29.6% of all households were made up of individuals, and 4.2% had someone living alone who was 65 years of age or older. The average household size was 2.51 and the average family size was 3.17.

In the CDP, the population was spread out, with 31.5% under the age of 18, 11.2% from 18 to 24, 32.9% from 25 to 44, 17.4% from 45 to 64, and 7.1% who were 65 years of age or older. The median age was 29 years. For every 100 females, there were 106.1 males. For every 100 females age 18 and over, there were 102.5 males.

The median income for a household in the CDP was $26,893, and the median income for a family was $26,202. Males had a median income of $26,385 versus $20,625 for females. The per capita income for the CDP was $14,560. About 20.3% of families and 24.5% of the population were below the poverty line, including 41.2% of those under age 18 and none of those age 65 or over.
