= Oswego, South Carolina =

- CDP
- Location within the state of South Carolina
- Coordinates: 34°00′10″N 80°17′14″W
- Country: United States
- State: South Carolina
- County: Sumter

Area
  - Total: 1.20 sq mi (3.12 km^{2})
  - Land: 1.20 sq mi (3.12 km^{2})
  - Water: 0 sq mi (0.00 km^{2})
- Elevation: 154 ft (47 m)

Population (2020)
  - Total: 86
  - Density: 71.4/sq mi (27.55/km^{2})
- Time zone: UTC-5 (Eastern (EST))
  - Summer (DST): UTC-4 (EDT)
- ZIP code: 29150
- Area codes: 803, 839
- FIPS code: 45-53485
- GNIS feature ID: 2403383

Oswego is a census-designated place (CDP) in Sumter County, South Carolina, United States. The population was 95 at the 2000 census. It is included in the Sumter, South Carolina Metropolitan Statistical Area.

== Geography ==
According to the United States Census Bureau, the CDP has a total area of 1.6 square miles (4.3 km^{2}), all land.

== Demographics ==
Historical population
Census	Pop.	Note	%±
2020	86		—
U.S. Decennial Census

As of the census of 2000, there were 95 people, 42 households, and 34 families residing in the CDP. The population density was 57.7 inhabitants per square mile (22.3/km^{2}). There were 42 housing units at an average density of 25.5/sq mi (9.8/km^{2}). The racial makeup of the CDP was 89.47% White, 9.47% African American and 1.05% Native American.

There were 42 households, out of which 23.8% had children under the age of 18 living with them, 73.8% were married couples living together, 7.1% had a female householder with no husband present, and 16.7% were non-families. 14.3% of all households were made up of individuals, and 11.9% had someone living alone who was 65 years of age or older. The average household size was 2.26 and the average family size was 2.49.

In the CDP, the population was spread out, with 16.8% under the age of 18, 2.1% from 18 to 24, 18.9% from 25 to 44, 32.6% from 45 to 64, and 29.5% who were 65 years of age or older. The median age was 52 years. For every 100 females, there were 82.7 males. For every 100 females age 18 and over, there were 88.1 males.

The median income for a household in the CDP was $50,714, and the median income for a family was $52,500. Males had a median income of $38,750 versus $25,417 for females. The per capita income for the CDP was $23,379. None of the population and none of the families were below the poverty line.
