= Cane Savannah, South Carolina =

- CDP
- Location within the state of South Carolina
- Coordinates: 33°53′32″N 80°26′23″W
- Country: United States
- State: South Carolina
- County: Sumter

Area
  - Total: 3.70 sq mi (9.58 km^{2})
  - Land: 3.63 sq mi (9.40 km^{2})
  - Water: 0.069 sq mi (0.18 km^{2})
- Elevation: 180 ft (55 m)

Population (2020)
  - Total: 1,335
  - Density: 367.7/sq mi (141.98/km^{2})
- Time zone: UTC-5 (Eastern (EST))
  - Summer (DST): UTC-4 (EDT)
- FIPS code: 45-11350
- GNIS feature ID: 2402747

Cane Savannah is a census-designated place (CDP) in Sumter County, South Carolina, United States. The population was 1,452 at the 2000 census. It is included in the Sumter, South Carolina Metropolitan Statistical Area.

== Geography ==
According to the United States Census Bureau, the CDP has a total area of 4.3 square miles (11 km^{2}), of which 4.2 square miles (11 km^{2}) is land and 0.1 square miles (0.26 km^{2}) (1.64%) is water.

== Demographics ==
Historical population
Census	Pop.	Note	%±
2020	1,335		—
U.S. Decennial Census

As of the census of 2000, there were 1,452 people, 488 households, and 404 families residing in the CDP. The population density was 346.4 inhabitants per square mile (133.7/km^{2}). There were 524 housing units at an average density of 125.0 per square mile (48.3/km^{2}). The racial makeup of the CDP was 64.33% White, 34.71% African American, 0.28% Native American, 0.62% Asian, and 0.07% from two or more races. Hispanic or Latino of any race were 1.03% of the population.

There were 488 households, out of which 45.9% had children under the age of 18 living with them, 65.6% were married couples living together, 12.3% had a female householder with no husband present, and 17.2% were non-families. 13.9% of all households were made up of individuals, and 2.7% had someone living alone who was 65 years of age or older. The average household size was 2.98 and the average family size was 3.28.

In the CDP, the population was spread out, with 30.9% under the age of 18, 7.9% from 18 to 24, 33.0% from 25 to 44, 21.7% from 45 to 64, and 6.5% who were 65 years of age or older. The median age was 34 years. For every 100 females, there were 99.5 males. For every 100 females age 18 and over, there were 92.1 males.

The median income for a household in the CDP was $41,607, and the median income for a family was $42,197. Males had a median income of $27,540 versus $21,049 for females. The per capita income for the CDP was $14,529. About 10.2% of families and 12.8% of the population were below the poverty line, including 25.3% of those under age 18 and 4.7% of those age 65 or over.
