= Mulberry, South Carolina =

- CDP
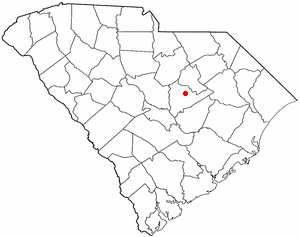
- Location of Mulberry, South Carolina
- Coordinates: 33°57′24″N 80°19′54″W
- Country: United States
- State: South Carolina
- County: Sumter

Area
  - Total: 1.98 sq mi (5.13 km^{2})
  - Land: 1.97 sq mi (5.09 km^{2})
  - Water: 0.015 sq mi (0.04 km^{2})
- Elevation: 144 ft (44 m)

Population (2020)
  - Total: 540
  - Density: 274.9/sq mi (106.13/km^{2})
- Time zone: UTC-5 (Eastern (EST))
  - Summer (DST): UTC-4 (EDT)
- FIPS code: 45-48737
- GNIS feature ID: 2403316

Mulberry is a census-designated place (CDP) in Sumter County, South Carolina, United States. The population was 841 at the 2000 census. It is included in the Sumter, South Carolina Metropolitan Statistical Area.

== Geography ==
According to the United States Census Bureau, the CDP has a total area of 2.0 square miles (5.1 km^{2}), of which 2.0 square miles (5.1 km^{2}) is land and 0.04 square mile (0.1 km^{2}) (1.01%) is water.

== Demographics ==
Historical population
Census	Pop.	Note	%±
2020	540		—
U.S. Decennial Census

As of the census of 2000, there were 841 people, 203 households, and 151 families residing in the CDP. The population density was 428.4 inhabitants per square mile (165.4/km^{2}). There were 234 housing units at an average density of 119.2 per square mile (46.0/km^{2}). The racial makeup of the CDP was 46.85% White, 46.49% African American, 0.71% Native American, 5.71% from other races, and 0.24% from two or more races. Hispanic or Latino of any race were 9.27% of the population.

There were 203 households, out of which 26.1% had children under the age of 18 living with them, 61.1% were married couples living together, 8.4% had a female householder with no husband present, and 25.6% were non-families. 22.2% of all households were made up of individuals, and 8.4% had someone living alone who was 65 years of age or older. The average household size was 2.61 and the average family size was 2.96.

In the CDP, the population was spread out, with 14.7% under the age of 18, 19.9% from 18 to 24, 32.8% from 25 to 44, 18.2% from 45 to 64, and 14.4% who were 65 years of age or older. The median age was 34 years. For every 100 females, there were 191.0 males. For every 100 females age 18 and over, there were 207.7 males.

The median income for a household in the CDP was $34,432, and the median income for a family was $37,045. Males had a median income of $21,324 versus $19,653 for females. The per capita income for the CDP was $10,527. About 10.4% of families and 25.0% of the population were below the poverty line, including 36.2% of those under age 18 and 26.2% of those age 65 or over.
