= Oakland, South Carolina =

- CDP
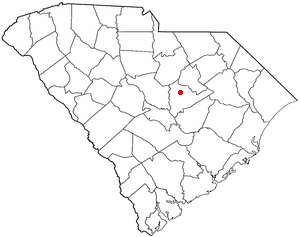
- Location of Oakland, South Carolina
- Coordinates: 33°59′16″N 80°29′58″W
- Country: United States
- State: South Carolina
- County: Sumter

Area
  - Total: 0.69 sq mi (1.78 km^{2})
  - Land: 0.68 sq mi (1.76 km^{2})
  - Water: 0.0077 sq mi (0.02 km^{2})
- Elevation: 292 ft (89 m)

Population (2020)
  - Total: 1,099
  - Density: 1,615.7/sq mi (623.81/km^{2})
- Time zone: UTC-5 (Eastern (EST))
  - Summer (DST): UTC-4 (EDT)
- FIPS code: 45-51887
- GNIS feature ID: 2403366

Oakland is a census-designated place (CDP) in Sumter County, South Carolina, United States. The population was 1,272 at the 2000 census. It is included in the Sumter, South Carolina Metropolitan Statistical Area. Part of the area of the census-designated place is located within the Stateburg Historic District

== Geography ==
According to the United States Census Bureau, the CDP has a total area of 0.7 square miles (1.8 km^{2}), all land.

== Demographics ==
Historical population
Census	Pop.	Note	%±
2020	1,099		—
U.S. Decennial Census

As of the census of 2000, there were 1,272 people, 513 households, and 372 families residing in the CDP. The population density was 1,870.9 inhabitants per square mile (722.4/km^{2}). There were 543 housing units at an average density of 798.7 per square mile (308.4/km^{2}). The racial makeup of the CDP was 59.20% White, 34.20% African American, 0.55% Native American, 2.59% Asian, 1.73% from other races, and 1.73% from two or more races. Hispanic or Latino of any race were 3.46% of the population.

There were 513 households, out of which 32.9% had children under the age of 18 living with them, 50.3% were married couples living together, 19.1% had a female householder with no husband present, and 27.3% were non-families. 23.0% of all households were made up of individuals, and 9.2% had someone living alone who was 65 years of age or older. The average household size was 2.48 and the average family size was 2.89.

In the CDP, the population was spread out, with 26.2% under the age of 18, 9.8% from 18 to 24, 25.2% from 25 to 44, 23.8% from 45 to 64, and 15.0% who were 65 years of age or older. The median age was 37 years. For every 100 females, there were 85.4 males. For every 100 females age 18 and over, there were 83.0 males.

The median income for a household in the CDP was $43,889, and the median income for a family was $46,806. Males had a median income of $28,750 versus $20,764 for females. The per capita income for the CDP was $21,272. About 2.8% of families and 6.6% of the population were below the poverty line, including 10.8% of those under age 18 and 7.6% of those age 65 or over.
