= Sumter County, South Carolina =

County in South Carolina, United States

- County
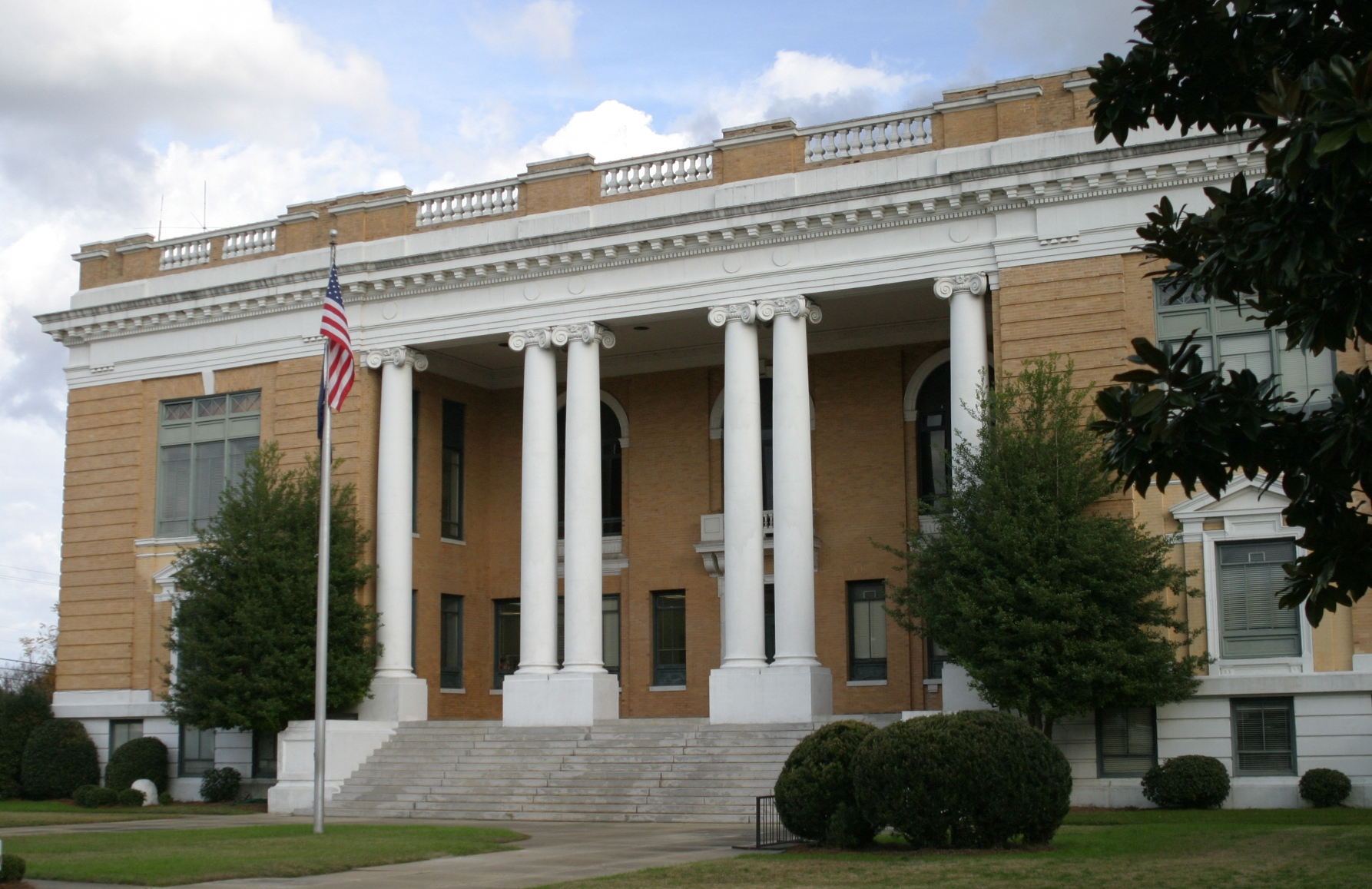
- Sumter County Courthouse

- Flag Seal Logo
- Nickname: The Gamecock County
- Location within the U.S. state of South Carolina
- Coordinates: 33.92°N 80.38°W
- Country: United States
- State: South Carolina
- Founded: January 1, 1800
- Named for: Thomas Sumter
- Seat: Sumter
- Largest community: Sumter

Area
  - Total: 682.09 sq mi (1,766.6 km^{2})
  - Land: 665.08 sq mi (1,722.5 km^{2})
  - Water: 17.01 sq mi (44.1 km^{2}) 2.49%

Population (2020)
  - Total: 105,556
  - Estimate (2025): 105,067 ▼
  - Density: 158.71/sq mi (61.279/km^{2})
- Time zone: UTC−5 (Eastern)
  - Summer (DST): UTC−4 (EDT)
- Congressional districts: 5th, 6th
- Website: www.sumtercountysc.gov

Sumter County is a county located in the U.S. state of South Carolina. As of the 2020 census, the population was 105,556. Its county seat is Sumter. Sumter County comprises the Sumter, SC Metropolitan Statistical Area, which is also included in the Columbia-Sumter-Orangeburg, SC Combined Statistical Area. The county is also part of "The Midlands" area.

It is the home of Shaw AFB, headquarters to the 9th Air Force, AFCENT, United States Army Central, with a number of other tenant units. It is one of largest bases in the USAF's Air Combat Command.

On September 17, 2024, the National Park Service announced that the City of Sumter and Sumter County were jointly named a World War II Heritage City.

In Sumter County, there is somewhat of a large population of people with Turkish ancestry that descend from Joseph Benenhaley and other Turks who fled the Ottoman Empire and settled in Sumter County to serve in the American Revolution.

== History ==
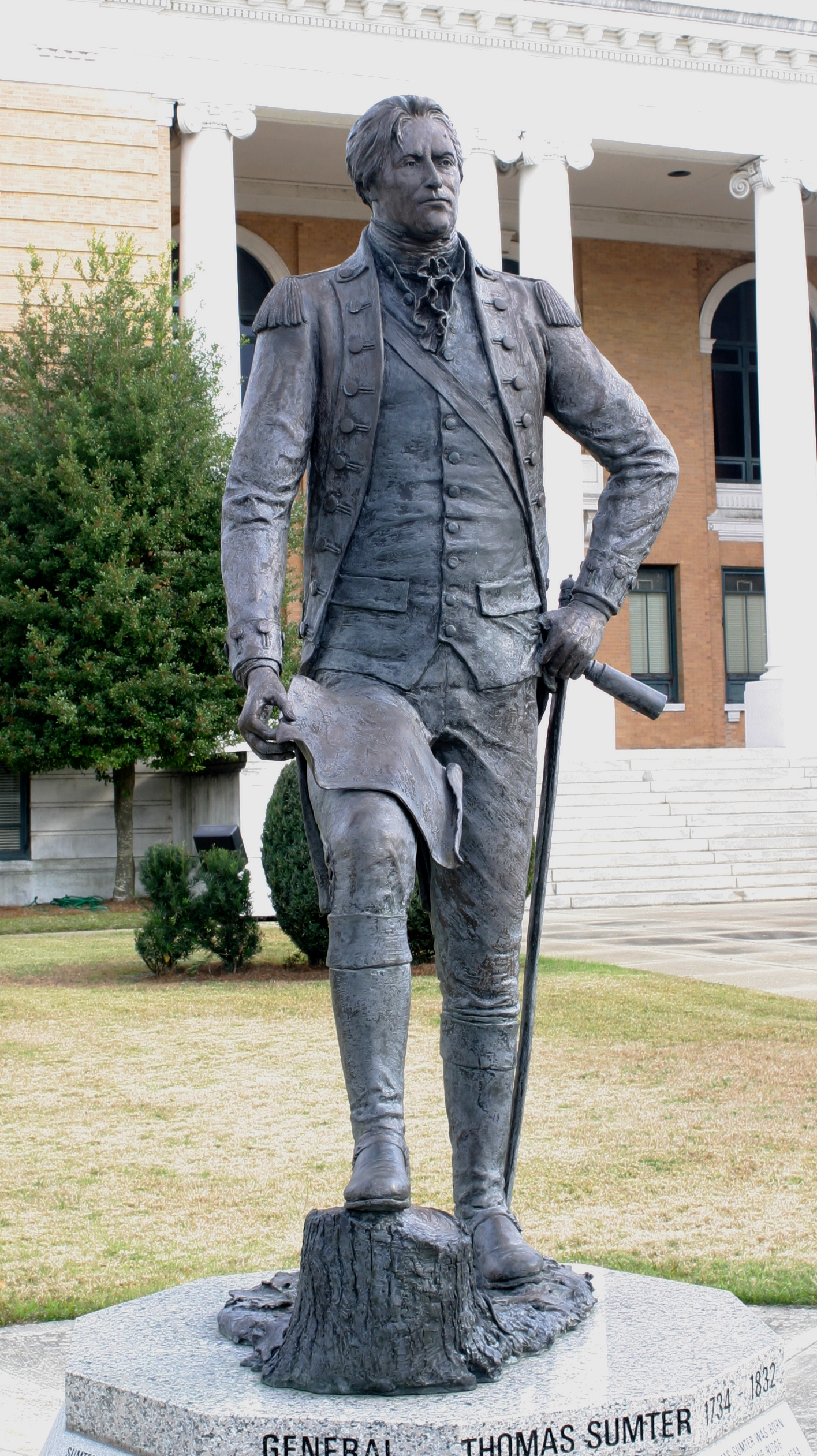
Statue of Thomas Sumter on the Sumter County Courthouse lawn in Sumter

Sumter County was created from Clarendon, Claremont and Salem Counties as Sumter District in 1798, named after General Thomas Sumter, and became effective in 1800. When the home of Sumter District's clerk of records burnt in 1801, the formative records of the three predecessor counties were also destroyed in the conflagration. As a result, documentary evidence that the three counties were within St. Mark's Parish (formed in 1757 from Prince Frederick's Parish, Craven County) in Camden District (formed 1769) derives from family genealogies and legislative records.

On December 19, 1855, a legislative act was passed partitioning Sumter District by forming Clarendon District, with the same boundaries as defined for Clarendon County in 1785. When effectuated in 1857, a northeastern part of Sumter District (formerly in Salem County) was also separated in the partition (the area east of a line drawn from the northernmost point of old Clarendon County continued north-northeasterly to a point on the boundary line with Darlington District (Sumter County's northeastern cornerpoint abutting Florence County since 1888).

The Sumter District gained a form of self-rule and was renamed Sumter County under the 1868 Constitution.

In 1898, a northwestern part of Sumter County was detached to form part of the first Lee County, but its formation was declared unconstitutional in 1899. In 1902, an even larger northern part of Sumter County (more or less the remaining part of former Salem County) was properly legally detached to form the major sections of the current Lee County, of which some acreage reverted in 1914.

In 1921, southern Sumter County received a section from Clarendon County, of which some acreage reverted in 1922, creating the current boundaries of Sumter County.

== Geography ==
Interactive map of Sumter County

According to the U.S. Census Bureau, the county has a total area of 682.09 square miles (1,766.6 km^{2}), of which 665.08 square miles (1,722.5 km^{2}) is land and 17.01 square miles (44.1 km^{2}) (2.49%) is water. It is drained by the Black River and its tributaries. Its western border is formed by the Wateree River. One of South Carolina's most famous areas are the High Hills of Santee comprising the western part of the county. The county is one of five that borders Lake Marion, also known as South Carolina's "Inland Sea".

=== State and local protected areas/sites ===
- Bland Tract Dove Field, Manchester State Forest (MSF) Wildlife Management Area
- Manchester State Forest (part)
- Millford Plantation Historic Site
- Poinsett State Park
- Swan Lake Iris Gardens
- Tuomey Tract Dove Field, Manchester State Forest (MSF) Wildlife Management Area
- Woods Bay State Park (part)

=== Major water bodies ===
- Congaree River
- Lake Marion
- Lynches River
- Pocoaligo River
- Rocky Bluff Swamp
- Scape Ore Swamp
- Wateree River

=== Adjacent counties ===
- Lee County – north
- Florence County – northeast
- Clarendon County – south
- Calhoun County – southwest
- Richland County – west
- Kershaw County – northwest

=== Major highways ===
- I-95
- US 15
- US 15 Conn.
- US 76
- US 76 Bus.
- US 378
- US 401
- US 521
- SC 120
- SC 261
- SC 441
- SC 763

=== Major infrastructure ===
- Shaw Air Force Base
- Sumter Airport

== Demographics ==
Historical population
Census	Pop.	Note	%±
1800	3,571		—
1810	19,054		433.6%
1820	25,269		32.6%
1830	28,277		11.9%
1840	27,892		−1.4%
1850	33,220		19.1%
1860	23,859		−28.2%
1870	25,268		5.9%
1880	37,037		46.6%
1890	43,605		17.7%
1900	51,237		17.5%
1910	38,472		−24.9%
1920	43,040		11.9%
1930	45,902		6.6%
1940	52,463		14.3%
1950	57,634		9.9%
1960	74,941		30.0%
1970	79,425		6.0%
1980	88,243		11.1%
1990	102,637		16.3%
2000	104,646		2.0%
2010	107,456		2.7%
2020	105,556		−1.8%
2025 (est.)	105,067	▼	−0.5%
U.S. Decennial Census; 1790–1960 1900–1990; 1990–2000 2010 2020

=== Racial and ethnic composition ===
Sumter County, South Carolina – Racial and ethnic composition Note: the US Census treats Hispanic/Latino as an ethnic category. This table excludes Latinos from the racial categories and assigns them to a separate category. Hispanics/Latinos may be of any race.
Race / Ethnicity (NH = Non-Hispanic)	Pop 1980	Pop 1990	Pop 2000	Pop 2010	Pop 2020	% 1980	% 1990	% 2000	% 2010	% 2020
White alone (NH)	47,783	56,130	51,664	50,423	46,442	54.15%	54.69%	49.37%	46.92%	44.00%
Black or African American alone (NH)	38,334	44,139	48,617	50,110	48,536	43.44%	43.00%	46.46%	46.63%	45.98%
Native American or Alaska Native alone (NH)	102	198	257	334	338	0.12%	0.19%	0.25%	0.31%	0.32%
Asian alone (NH)	467	880	938	1,167	1,400	0.53%	0.86%	0.90%	1.09%	1.33%
Native Hawaiian or Pacific Islander alone (NH)	x	x	56	93	87	x	x	0.05%	0.09%	0.08%
Other race alone (NH)	218	51	157	130	316	0.25%	0.05%	0.15%	0.12%	0.30%
Mixed race or Multiracial (NH)	x	x	1,039	1,667	4,135	x	x	0.99%	1.55%	3.92%
Hispanic or Latino (any race)	1,339	1,239	1,918	3,532	4,302	1.52%	1.21%	1.83%	3.29%	4.08%
Total	88,243	102,637	104,646	107,456	105,556	100.00%	100.00%	100.00%	100.00%	100.00%

=== 2020 census ===
As of the 2020 census, there were 105,556 people, 41,904 households, and 29,777 families residing in the county.

The median age was 38.9 years, 22.9% of residents were under the age of 18, and 17.7% were 65 years of age or older; for every 100 females there were 91.9 males, and for every 100 females age 18 and over there were 89.0 males age 18 and over.

The racial makeup of the county was 44.9% White, 46.3% Black or African American, 0.4% American Indian and Alaska Native, 1.4% Asian, 0.1% Native Hawaiian and Pacific Islander, 1.8% from some other race, and 5.1% from two or more races; Hispanic or Latino residents of any race comprised 4.1% of the population.

65.2% of residents lived in urban areas, while 34.8% lived in rural areas.

Of those households, 30.8% had children under the age of 18 living with them, 34.3% had a female householder with no spouse or partner present, 29.4% were single-person households, and 12.8% had someone living alone who was 65 years of age or older.

There were 46,753 housing units, of which 10.4% were vacant; among occupied units, 65.7% were owner-occupied and 34.3% were renter-occupied, with homeowner and rental vacancy rates of 1.4% and 8.0%, respectively.

=== 2010 census ===
At the 2010 census, there were 107,456 people, 40,398 households, and 28,311 families residing in the county. The population density was 161.6 inhabitants per square mile (62.4/km^{2}). There were 46,011 housing units at an average density of 69.2 per square mile (26.7/km^{2}). The racial makeup of the county was 48.2% white, 46.9% black or African American, 1.1% Asian, 0.4% American Indian, 0.1% Pacific islander, 1.4% from other races, and 1.9% from two or more races. Those of Hispanic or Latino origin made up 3.3% of the population. In terms of ancestry, 7.2% were Subsaharan African, 6.9% were American, 6.1% were English, 5.9% were German, and 5.7% were Irish.

Of the 40,398 households, 36.5% had children under the age of 18 living with them, 44.6% were married couples living together, 20.2% had a female householder with no husband present, 29.9% were non-families, and 25.8% of all households were made up of individuals. The average household size was 2.59 and the average family size was 3.11. The median age was 35.4 years.

The median income for a household in the county was $39,137 and the median income for a family was $45,460. Males had a median income of $36,101 versus $28,421 for females. The per capita income for the county was $18,944. About 15.5% of families and 19.4% of the population were below the poverty line, including 29.1% of those under age 18 and 14.7% of those age 65 or over.

== Government and politics ==
A Republican-leaning swing county beginning around 1950, Sumter County has supported Democrats in every election beginning in 2004. Republicans have still gained over 40% of the vote since then, however, and the Democrat margins of victory were narrow (less than 5%) in both 2004 and 2024.

United States presidential election results for Sumter County, South Carolina
Year	Republican		Democratic		Third party(ies)	
Year	No.	%	No.	%	No.	%
1892	639	29.29%	1,535	70.35%	8	0.37%
1896	326	17.16%	1,550	81.58%	24	1.26%
1900	150	11.12%	1,199	88.88%	0	0.00%
1904	137	12.97%	919	87.03%	0	0.00%
1908	173	12.28%	1,228	87.15%	8	0.57%
1912	31	3.12%	910	91.64%	52	5.24%
1916	142	9.34%	1,357	89.28%	21	1.38%
1920	194	14.43%	1,150	85.57%	0	0.00%
1924	18	1.48%	1,136	93.42%	62	5.10%
1928	174	12.65%	1,202	87.35%	0	0.00%
1932	59	3.14%	1,809	96.43%	8	0.43%
1936	58	2.74%	2,062	97.26%	0	0.00%
1944	73	3.04%	2,111	87.92%	217	9.04%
1948	154	4.43%	605	17.40%	2,718	78.17%
1952	4,726	70.12%	2,014	29.88%	0	0.00%
1956	1,356	22.47%	937	15.53%	3,741	62.00%
1960	4,633	63.91%	2,616	36.09%	0	0.00%
1964	7,729	67.19%	3,775	32.81%	0	0.00%
1968	5,451	33.43%	6,103	37.42%	4,754	29.15%
1972	10,892	64.83%	5,801	34.53%	107	0.64%
1976	9,332	46.87%	10,471	52.59%	109	0.55%
1980	10,557	52.45%	9,205	45.74%	364	1.81%
1984	12,909	57.14%	9,566	42.35%	115	0.51%
1988	13,161	57.72%	9,502	41.67%	138	0.61%
1992	12,576	47.29%	11,852	44.56%	2,168	8.15%
1996	12,080	47.57%	12,198	48.04%	1,114	4.39%
2000	15,915	51.89%	14,365	46.83%	392	1.28%
2004	18,074	48.84%	18,695	50.52%	234	0.63%
2008	18,581	41.89%	25,431	57.33%	346	0.78%
2012	19,274	40.74%	27,589	58.32%	446	0.94%
2016	18,745	42.52%	24,047	54.55%	1,294	2.94%
2020	21,000	42.93%	27,379	55.97%	541	1.11%
2024	21,215	46.97%	23,425	51.86%	530	1.17%

== Economy ==
In 2022, the GDP was $5 billion (about $48,450 per capita), and the real GDP was $4.2 billion (about $40,489 per capita) in chained 2017 dollars.

As of April 2024, some of the largest employers in the county include Becton Dickinson, Central Carolina Technical College, the city of Sumter, Continental AG, the United States Department of Defense, Eaton Corporation, SKF, JCPenney, Pilgrim's Pride, Prisma Health, Speedway, and Walmart.

Employment and Wage Statistics by Industry in Sumter County, South Carolina - Q3 2023
Industry	Employment Counts	Employment Percentage (%)	Average Annual Wage ($)
Accommodation and Food Services	3,537	10.0	18,980
Administrative and Support and Waste Management and Remediation Services	1,736	4.9	42,380
Agriculture, Forestry, Fishing and Hunting	241	0.7	49,244
Arts, Entertainment, and Recreation	342	1.0	16,692
Construction	2,529	7.2	63,388
Educational Services	2,912	8.3	48,048
Finance and Insurance	824	2.3	73,060
Health Care and Social Assistance	5,453	15.5	53,768
Information	187	0.5	62,608
Management of Companies and Enterprises	223	0.6	93,912
Manufacturing	6,366	18.1	62,140
Other Services (except Public Administration)	978	2.8	39,312
Professional, Scientific, and Technical Services	934	2.7	75,036
Public Administration	2,510	7.1	58,448
Real Estate and Rental and Leasing	221	0.6	43,680
Retail Trade	4,497	12.8	29,796
Transportation and Warehousing	896	2.5	60,476
Utilities	143	0.4	79,248
Wholesale Trade	710	2.0	61,568
Total	35,239	100.0%	49,611

== Education ==
All areas in the county are in the Sumter County Consolidated School District. Additionally, the University of South Carolina Sumter is located in the county.

== Communities ==
=== Cities ===
- Sumter (county seat and largest community)

=== Towns ===
- Mayesville
- Pinewood
- Rembert

=== Census-designated places ===
- Cane Savannah
- Cherryvale
- Dalzell
- East Sumter
- Lakewood
- Mulberry
- Oakland
- Oswego
- Privateer
- Rembert
- Shiloh
- South Sumter
- Stateburg
- Wedgefield

=== Unincorporated communities ===
- Horatio
- Millwood
- Wedgefield

== Notable people ==
- Ray Allen, NBA basketball player
- Richard H. Anderson, Confederate lieutenant general
- Mary McLeod Bethune, civil rights activist, feminist, stateswoman, educator, and founder of the National Council of Negro Women; born to parents who had been enslaved
- William Ellison, slave who was freed and settled in Stateburg where he became a large-scale slave owner and lived his life
- David DuBose Gaillard, in charge of the building of the central portion of the Panama Canal
- Sarah Ann Haynsworth Gayle (1804–1835), diarist
- Richard Irvine Manning I, 50th governor of South Carolina
- Richard Irvine Manning III, 92nd governor of South Carolina
- George L. Mabry, Jr., major general, Medal of Honor recipient, and highly decorated soldier of WWII
- Slomon Moody, physician, farmer, and city treasurer of Ocala, Florida
- Franklin J. Moses Jr., Governor of South Carolina from 1872 to 1874; enemies labelled him the "Robber Governor"
- Ja Morant, NBA basketball player for the Memphis Grizzlies
- Bill Pinkney, performer, singer, and member of The Drifters
- Freddie Solomon, NFL wide receiver
- Angelica Singleton Van Buren, Martin Van Buren's daughter-in-law and acting first lady of the United States during his presidency
- Joseph Benenhaley, progenitor of the Ottoman Turkish community in Sumter County, South Carolina and veteran in the American Revolutionary War.
- George Stinney, born in Pinewood, South Carolina, wrongfully executed after being accused of killing two white girls in Alcolu, South Carolina.

== See also ==
- List of counties in South Carolina
- National Register of Historic Places listings in Sumter County, South Carolina
