= East Sumter, South Carolina =

- CDP
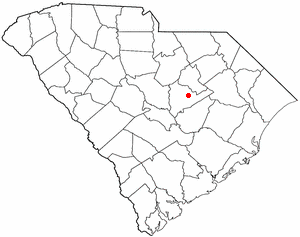
- Location of East Sumter, South Carolina
- Coordinates: 33°55′34″N 80°17′42″W
- Country: United States
- State: South Carolina
- County: Sumter

Area
  - Total: 3.32 sq mi (8.60 km^{2})
  - Land: 3.32 sq mi (8.59 km^{2})
  - Water: 0.0039 sq mi (0.01 km^{2})
- Elevation: 144 ft (44 m)

Population (2020)
  - Total: 1,135
  - Density: 342.3/sq mi (132.15/km^{2})
- Time zone: UTC-5 (Eastern (EST))
  - Summer (DST): UTC-4 (EDT)
- ZIP code: 29153
- Area code: 803
- FIPS code: 45-22547
- GNIS feature ID: 2402436

East Sumter is a census-designated place (CDP) in Sumter County, South Carolina, United States. The population was 1,220 at the 2000 census. It is included in the Sumter, South Carolina Metropolitan Statistical Area.

== Geography ==
According to the United States Census Bureau, the CDP has a total area of 3.3 square miles (8.5 km^{2}), of which 3.3 square miles (8.5 km^{2}) is land and 0.30% is water.

== Demographics ==
Historical population
Census	Pop.	Note	%±
2020	1,135		—
U.S. Decennial Census

As of the census of 2000, there were 1,220 people, 465 households, and 357 families residing in the CDP. The population density was 369.9 inhabitants per square mile (142.8/km^{2}). There were 505 housing units at an average density of 153.1 per square mile (59.1/km^{2}). The racial makeup of the CDP was 57.13% White, 41.89% African American, 0.25% Asian, 0.16% from other races, and 0.57% from two or more races. Hispanic or Latino of any race were 0.82% of the population.

There were 465 households, out of which 28.6% had children under the age of 18 living with them, 52.7% were married couples living together, 17.6% had a female householder with no husband present, and 23.2% were non-families. 21.3% of all households were made up of individuals, and 9.5% had someone living alone who was 65 years of age or older. The average household size was 2.62 and the average family size was 2.97.

In the CDP, the population was spread out, with 25.2% under the age of 18, 8.4% from 18 to 24, 26.8% from 25 to 44, 24.6% from 45 to 64, and 15.0% who were 65 years of age or older. The median age was 38 years. For every 100 females, there were 87.1 males. For every 100 females age 18 and over, there were 88.0 males.

The median income for a household in the CDP was $26,938, and the median income for a family was $30,257. Males had a median income of $26,169 versus $21,438 for females. The per capita income for the CDP was $13,010. About 16.1% of families and 15.4% of the population were below the poverty line, including 21.4% of those under age 18 and 18.6% of those age 65 or over.
