= List of unincorporated communities in South Carolina =

Map of the United States with South Carolina highlighted

There are unincorporated communities lacking elected municipal officers and boundaries with legal status.

== Unincorporated communities ==
Place Name	County(ies)
Adams Run	Charleston County
Alvin	Berkeley County
Ballentine	Richland County
Bath	Aiken County
Beech Island	Aiken County
Bethera	Berkeley County
Blackstock	Chester County; Fairfield County
Blair	Fairfield County
Bowling Green	York County
Cades	Williamsburg County
Canadys	Colleton County
Carolina Forest	Horry County
Cassatt	Kershaw County
Cateechee	Pickens County
Centenary	Marion County
Chappells	Newberry County
Cherokee Falls	Cherokee County
Cleveland	Greenville County
Conestee	Greenville County
Cordesville	Berkeley County
Cross	Berkeley County
Daufuskie Island	Beaufort County
Davis Station	Clarendon County
Dorchester	Charleston County
Drayton	Charleston County
Early Branch	Hampton County
Edgemoor	Chester County
Edisto Island	Charleston County
Effingham	Florence County
Elliott	Lee County
Floydale	Dillon County
Fork	Dillon County
Fort Motte	Calhoun County
Gable	Clarendon County
Garnett	Hampton County
Gowensville	Greenville County
Green Pond	Colleton County
Green Sea	Horry County
Gresham	Marion County
Grover	Dorchester County
Hamer	Dillon County
Horatio	Sumter County
Huger	Berkeley County
Jalapa	Newberry County
James Island	Charleston County
Johns Island	Charleston County
Kinards	Newberry County; Laurens County
Kings Creek	Cherokee County
La France	Anderson County
Lancaster Mill	Lancaster County
Lando	Chester County
Liberty Hill	Kershaw County
Little Rock	Dillon County
Lobeco	Beaufort County
Lone Star	Calhoun County
Long Creek	Oconee County
Longs	Horry County
Marietta	Greenville County
Martin	Allendale County
Miley	Hampton County
Millwood	Sumter County
Minturn	Dillon County
Montmorenci	Aiken County
Moore	Spartanburg County
Mount Holly	Berkeley County
Mountain Rest	Oconee County
Nesmith	Williamsburg County
New Zion	Clarendon County
Pacolet Mills	Spartanburg County
Parris Island	Beaufort County
Pauline	Spartanburg County
Pee Dee	Marion County
Pineland	Charleston County
Pineville	Berkeley County
Possum Kingdom	Pickens County
Poston	Florence County
Pumpkintown	Pickens County
Rains	Marion County
Richland	Oconee County
Rimini	Clarendon County
Rion	Fairfield County
Round O	Colleton County
Ruffin	Colleton County
Saint Helena Island	Beaufort County
Salters	Williamsburg County
Sandy Springs	Anderson County
Santuc	Union County
Sardinia	Clarendon County
Seabrook	Beaufort County
Sheldon	Beaufort County
Shulerville	Berkeley County
Slater	Greenville County
State Park	Richland County
Sunset	Pickens County
Tamassee	Oconee County
Tillman	Jasper County
Townville	Anderson County
Trio	Williamsburg County
Una	Darlington County; Lee County
Van Wyck	Lancaster County
Vaucluse	Aiken County
Wadmalaw Island	Charleston County
Wando	Berkeley County
Wedgefield	Sumter County
Westville	Kershaw County
White Oak	Fairfield County
White Rock	Richland County
White Stone	Spartanburg County
Wisacky	Lee County
Yonges Island	Charleston County
