= South Carolina Highway 917 =

State highway in South Carolina, United States

South Carolina Highway 917

Route information
- Maintained by SCDOT
- Length: 39.690 mi (63.875 km)
- Existed: 1940–present

Major junctions
- South end: SC 410 / SC 9 Bus. in Finklea
- SC 41 in Mullins; US 76 in Mullins; SC 41 south of Fork; SC 41 Alt. southwest of Fork; US 501 / US 301 in Latta
- North end: SC 38 west of Latta

Location
- Country: United States
- State: South Carolina
- Counties: Horry; Marion; Dillon

Highway system
- South Carolina State Highway System; Interstate; US; State; Scenic
← SC 914	→ US 1

South Carolina Highway 917 (SC 917) is a 39.690-mile (63.875 km) state highway in the northeastern part of the U.S. state of South Carolina. It travels from the SC 410/SC 9 Business (SC 9 Bus.) intersection between Green Sea and Loris in Horry County to the SC 38 intersection outside Latta in Dillon County.

== Route description ==
The highway travels in a southeast-to-northwest direction, but is signed as a north–south highway. It travels between SC 410/SC 9 Bus. in the community of Finklea, through Mullins where it has a concurrency with SC 41 and intersects US 76, Latta where it intersects U.S. Route 301 (US 301) and US 501, to SC 38 south of its interchange with I-95.

== History ==
=== South Carolina Highway 73 ===
South Carolina Highway 73
- Location: Latta, South Carolina
- Existed: 1939–1942

South Carolina Highway 73 (SC 73) was a state highway that was established in 1939 from US 301/US 501 in Latta southeast to SC 57 (now SC 41) south-southeast of Fork. In 1942, it was decommissioned and redesignated as SC 573. Today, most of its path is part of SC 917.

== Major intersections ==
County	Location	mi	km	Destinations	Notes
Horry	Finklea	0.000	0.000	SC 9 Bus. south – Loris, SC 45 (Bayboro Street), US 701 (Broad Street)	Continuation southeast beyond southern terminus
Horry	Finklea	0.000	0.000	SC 410 (Green Sea Road) / SC 9 Bus. north – Loris, North Myrtle Beach, Conway	Southern terminus
Marion	Mullins	18.990	30.561	SC 41 south (South Main Street) / West Proctor Street – Charleston	Southern end of SC 41 concurrency
Marion	Mullins	19.140	30.803	US 76 (McIntyre Street) – Nichols, Marion	
Marion		23.020	37.047	SC 41 north – Dillon	Northern end of SC 41 concurrency
Marion–Dillon county line	Smithboro	25.310	40.732	SC 41 Alt. – Fork, Lake View	
Dillon	Latta	34.460	55.458	US 301 / US 501 (Richardson Street) – Dillon, Florence	
Dillon		39.690	63.875	SC 38 – Marion, Myrtle Beach	Northern terminus
1.000 mi = 1.609 km; 1.000 km = 0.621 mi: Concurrency terminus
