= South Carolina Highway 41 =

State highway in South Carolina

South Carolina Highway 41

Route information
- Maintained by SCDOT
- Length: 121.5 mi (195.5 km)
- Existed: 1937–present

Major junctions
- South end: US 17 in Mount Pleasant
- US 17 Alt. in Jamestown; US 521 near Andrews; US 378 / SC 51 in Kingsburg; US 501 in Ariel Crossroad; US 76 / SC 917 in Mullins; SC 9 in Lake View
- North end: NC 41 at the North Carolina state line in Lake View

Location
- Country: United States
- State: South Carolina
- Counties: Charleston, Berkeley, Georgetown, Williamsburg, Florence, Marion, Dillon

Highway system
- South Carolina State Highway System; Interstate; US; State; Scenic
| ← SC 39 | → SC 45 |

South Carolina Highway 41 (SC 41) is a 121.5-mile (195.5 km) state highway, connecting the Charleston region with eastern portions of the Pee Dee region in South Carolina. It serves as an alternative route to U.S. Route 52.

== Route description ==
The route travels generally in a south–north direction, beginning in Mount Pleasant and ending at the North Carolina state line just north of Lake View, where it continues as North Carolina Highway 41 towards Lumberton. The route is mostly rural, though it serves as an important arterial in suburban Mount Pleasant and passes through several small towns on its route northwards. It also provides several key river and swamp crossings in the Pee Dee region.

== History ==
The current SC 41 was established in 1938 on a path from Lake View northeast to the North Carolina state line, where it replaced the original SC 94. The next year, a separate portion of the highway was established from the Marion–Dillon county line northward for about 5 miles (8.0 km). In 1940, the two segments were connected, and the highway was extended to what was then US 76 in Marion. Between 1944 and 1947, SC 41 was re-routed slightly within both Fork and Lake View. In 1949, its southern terminus was shifted to the northwest in Marion, to then end at what was then part of US 501 (now is US 501 Bus.). In September 1951, its path was re-routed in Fork to replace SC 57 to Centenary, SC 175 to Hemingway, and SC 511 to Mount Pleasant. Its former path from Centenary to Fork was redesignated as SC 41 Alt. In 1970, the highway was shifted off of the bypass around Andrews and was routed through the town. Approximately 25 years later, it was put back on the Andrews bypass; its former path was redesignated as SC 41 Bus.

=== South Carolina Highway 41 (1920s) ===
South Carolina Highway 41
- Location: Goose Creek–Society Hill, South Carolina
- Existed: 1922–1928

South Carolina Highway 41 (SC 41) was an original state highway that was established in 1922 from SC 2 (now U.S. Route 78 (US 78)) near Goose Creek, through Moncks Corner, Kingstree, Lake City, Florence, and Darlington, and ended at SC 50 south-southwest of Cheraw. Approximately three years later, its path from St. Stephen to Kingstree was shifted to the west. Between St. Stephen and Pineville, this replaced the original SC 45 corridor. The former path between Gourdin and Lane was redesignated as SC 412, part of SC 44, and abandoned roadway across the Santee River. In 1927, US 17 was designated along SC 41 from Goose Creek to Florence and US 601 from Florence to the Cheraw area. The next year, the state highway was decommissioned. Most of its path is approximately equal today as US 52.

=== South Carolina Highway 41 (1930s) ===
South Carolina Highway 41
- Location: New Zion, South Carolina
- Existed: c.1935–1938

South Carolina Highway 41 (SC 41) was a state highway that was established in either 1934 or 1935 from U.S. Route 301 (US 301) west-northwest of the community of New Zion east-southeast to the community. In 1938, it was decommissioned and redesignated as SC 94. Its path is known today as Salem Road.

== Future ==
The Wando River Bridge, a through truss swing bridge built in 1939, was replaced by 2020–2021. The new bridge will be four-lane with median (which can be used as a fifth lane during emergencies), and will be a fixed span bridge, tall enough for tall ships to pass. At a planned cost of $42.3 million, construction began in mid-2015.

== Junction list ==
| County | Location | mi | km | Destinations | Notes |
|---|---|---|---|---|---|
| Charleston | Mount Pleasant | 0.0 | 0.0 | US 17 – Mount Pleasant, Charleston, McClellanville, Georgetown | |
| Berkeley | | 5.0 | 8.0 | Wando River | |
| Berkeley | Huger | 17.2 | 27.7 | SC 402 west – Moncks Corner | |
| Berkeley | Jamestown | 32.3 | 52.0 | US 17 Alt. south / SC 45 – Moncks Corner, St. Stephen | South end of US 17 Alt overlap |
| Williamsburg | | 38.2 | 61.5 | US 17 Alt. north (Saints Delight Road) – Georgetown, Myrtle Beach | North end of US 17 Alt overlap |
| Williamsburg | | 43.7 | 70.3 | SC 41 Bus. north (Morgan Avenue) – Andrews | |
| Williamsburg | | 45.3 | 72.9 | US 521 south – Georgetown | South end of US 521 overlap |
| Williamsburg | Andrews | 46.5 | 74.8 | US 521 north / US 521 Bus. south (Main Street) – Kingstree, Manning, Andrews | North end of US 521 overlap |
| Williamsburg | | 47.9 | 77.1 | SC 41 Bus. south (Morgan Avenue) – Andrews | |
| Williamsburg | | 49.7 | 80.0 | SC 527 west (Thurgood Marshall Highway) – Warsaw, Kingstree | |
| Williamsburg | Rhems | 59.2 | 95.3 | SC 51 south (Browns Ferry Road) – Georgetown | South end of SC 51 overlap |
| Williamsburg | | 61.6 | 99.1 | SC 513 north (County Line Road) – Outland, Yauhannah | |
| Williamsburg | Rome Crossroads | 62.8 | 101.1 | SC 512 (Henry Road) – Kingstree | |
| Williamsburg | Hemingway | 70.3 | 113.1 | SC 261 (Broad Street) – Conway, Stuckey, Kingstree | |
| Florence | Johnsonville | 74.9 | 120.5 | SC 341 west (Broadway Street) – Lake City | |
| Florence | Kingsburg | 79.4 | 127.8 | US 378 west / SC 51 north (Myrtle Beach Highway) – Lake City, Florence, Sumter | West end of US 378 and north end of SC 51 overlap |
| Marion | Gresham | 83.0 | 133.6 | US 378 east – Conway | East end of US 378 overlap |
| Marion | | 88.1 | 141.8 | SC 908 south – Brittons Neck, Conway | |
| Marion | Centenary | 91.6 | 147.4 | SC 41 Alt. north – Marion | |
| Marion | Ariel Crossroad | 96.3 | 155.0 | US 501 – Conway, Myrtle Beach, Marion | Interchange |
| Marion | Mullins | 106.0 | 170.6 | US 76 / SC 917 east (Mclntyre Street) – Nichols, Loris, Marion | East end of SC 917 overlap |
| Marion | | 110.0 | 177.0 | SC 917 west – Latta | West end of SC 917 overlap |
| Dillon | Fork | 112.3 | 180.7 | SC 41 Alt. south / SC 57 north – Dillon, Marion | To Little Pee Dee State Park |
| Dillon | Lake View | 119.4 | 192.2 | SC 9 (Third Avenue) – Nichols, North Myrtle Beach, Dillon | |
| Dillon | | 121.5 | 195.5 | NC 41 north – Fairmont | Continuation beyond North Carolina state line |
1.000 mi = 1.609 km; 1.000 km = 0.621 mi: Concurrency terminus

== Special routes ==
=== Andrews business loop ===
South Carolina Highway 41 Business
- Location: Andrews, South Carolina
- Length: 4.660 mi (7.500 km)
- Existed: 1996–present

Established between 1993 and 1996, it replaced mainline SC 41 through downtown Andrews. This is second business loop through Andrew, following exactly the same route from 1960-63 until 1970.

| County | Location | mi | km | Destinations | Notes |
|---|---|---|---|---|---|
| Williamsburg | | 0.000 | 0.000 | SC 41 – Hemingway, Charleston | Southern terminus |
| Georgetown | | 1.786– 1.900 | 2.874– 3.058 | To US 521 – Georgetown | |
| Georgetown | Andrews | 3.150 | 5.069 | US 521 Bus. (Main Street) – Georgetown, Kingstree | |
| Williamsburg | | 4.660 | 7.500 | SC 41 (County Line Road) – Charleston, Hemingway | Northern terminus |
1.000 mi = 1.609 km; 1.000 km = 0.621 mi

=== Marion alternate route ===
South Carolina Highway 41 Alternate
- Location: Marion, South Carolina
- Length: 22.904 mi (36.860 km)
- Existed: 1952–present

South Carolina Highway 41 Alternate (SC 41 Alt.) is a 22.904-mile (36.860 km) alternate route that exists west of the SC 41 mainline path. It connects Centenary and Fork, via Marion, while the mainline travels through Mullins in this area.

Established in 1951 or 1952 as a new alternate route of SC 41 through Marion, though it did replace part of SC 175 south of Marion.

| County | Location | mi | km | Destinations | Notes |
|---|---|---|---|---|---|
| Marion | Centenary | 0.000 | 0.000 | SC 41 – Johnsonville, Charleston, Mullins | Southern terminus |
| Marion | | 8.934 | 14.378 | US 501 Bus. south to US 501 – Conway, Myrtle Beach, Dillon | Southern end of US 501 Bus. concurrency |
| Marion | | | | SC 576 west – Florence | Eastern terminus of SC 576 |
| Marion | Marion | | | US 76 (Liberty Street) – Mullins, Florence | |
| Marion | Marion | 12.214 | 19.657 | US 501 Bus. north (Main Street) – Dillon | Northern end of US 501 Bus. conurrency |
| Marion | | 15.604 | 25.112 | US 501 – Conway, Dillon | Interchange |
| Marion | Zion | | | I-73 | Proposed interchange |
| Dillon | Smithboro | 21.114 | 33.980 | SC 917 – Mullins, Latta, Bennettsville | |
| Dillon | Fork | 22.904 | 36.860 | SC 41 / SC 57 – Mullins, Lake View, Dillon | Northern terminus; to Little Pee Dee State Park |
1.000 mi = 1.609 km; 1.000 km = 0.621 mi: Concurrency terminus; Unopened
