= Newtown, South Carolina =

- Census-designated place
- Location within South Carolina Location within the United States
- Coordinates: 34°24′04″N 79°21′24″W
- Country: United States
- State: South Carolina
- County: Dillon

Area
  - Total: 0.52 sq mi (1.35 km^{2})
  - Land: 0.52 sq mi (1.35 km^{2})
  - Water: 0 sq mi (0.00 km^{2})
- Elevation: 112 ft (34 m)

Population (2020)
  - Total: 770
  - Density: 1,479.8/sq mi (571.37/km^{2})
- Time zone: UTC-5 (Eastern (EST))
  - Summer (DST): UTC-4 (EDT)
- ZIP Code: 29536 (Dillon)
- Area codes: 843/854
- FIPS code: 45-50020
- GNIS feature ID: 2812950

Newtown is an unincorporated community and census-designated place (CDP) in Dillon County, South Carolina, United States. It was first listed as a CDP prior to the 2020 census which listed a population of 770.

The CDP is in central Dillon County, on the south side of Dillon, the county seat. Development is continuous between the two communities.

South Carolina Highway 57 passes through Newtown, leading north into Dillon and southeast 10 miles (16 km) to Fork.

== Demographics ==
Historical population
Census	Pop.	Note	%±
2020	770		—
U.S. Decennial Census; 2020

Newton first appeared as a census designated place in the 2020 U.S. census.

=== 2020 census ===
Newtown CDP, South Carolina – Demographic Profile (NH = Non-Hispanic)
Race / Ethnicity	Pop 2020	% 2020
White alone (NH)	7	0.91%
Black or African American alone (NH)	736	95.58%
Native American or Alaska Native alone (NH)	2	0.26%
Asian alone (NH)	0	0.00%
Pacific Islander alone (NH)	0	0.00%
Some Other Race alone (NH)	0	0.00%
Mixed Race/Multi-Racial (NH)	20	2.60%
Hispanic or Latino (any race)	5	0.65%
Total	770	100.00%

Note: the US Census treats Hispanic/Latino as an ethnic category. This table excludes Latinos from the racial categories and assigns them to a separate category. Hispanics/Latinos can be of any race.
