= Kemper, South Carolina =

- Unincorporated community
- Location within the state of South Carolina
- Coordinates: 34°19′42″N 79°11′58″W
- Country: United States
- State: South Carolina
- County: Dillon
- Time zone: UTC-5 (Eastern (EST))
  - Summer (DST): UTC-4 (EDT)

Kemper is an unincorporated community in Dillon County, South Carolina, United States. It is located along South Carolina Highway 41 southwest of Lake View, South Carolina, and northeast of Fork, South Carolina.
