= Daviston, South Carolina =

- Census-designated place
- Location within South Carolina Location within the United States
- Coordinates: 33°52′53″N 79°22′24″W
- Country: United States
- State: South Carolina
- County: Marion

Area
  - Total: 1.29 sq mi (3.34 km^{2})
  - Land: 1.29 sq mi (3.34 km^{2})
  - Water: 0 sq mi (0.00 km^{2})
- Elevation: 39 ft (12 m)

Population (2020)
  - Total: 417
  - Density: 323.6/sq mi (124.94/km^{2})
- Time zone: UTC-5 (Eastern (EST))
  - Summer (DST): UTC-4 (EDT)
- ZIP Code: 29546 (Gresham)
- Area codes: 843/854
- FIPS code: 45-18706
- GNIS feature ID: 2812978

Daviston is an unincorporated community and census-designated place (CDP) in Marion County, South Carolina, United States. It was first listed as a CDP prior to the 2020 census with a population of 417.

The CDP is in southern Marion County, along U.S. Route 378, which leads east 20 miles (32 km) to Conway and west 26 miles (42 km) to Lake City.

== Demographics ==
Historical population
Census	Pop.	Note	%±
2020	417		—
U.S. Decennial Census; 2020

Daviston first appeared as a census designated place in the 2020 U.S. census.

Daviston CDP, South Carolina – Racial and ethnic composition Note: the US Census treats Hispanic/Latino as an ethnic category. This table excludes Latinos from the racial categories and assigns them to a separate category. Hispanics/Latinos may be of any race.
Race / Ethnicity (NH = Non-Hispanic)	Pop 2020	% 2020
White alone (NH)	128	30.70%
Black or African American alone (NH)	213	51.08%
Native American or Alaska Native alone (NH)	0	0.00%
Asian alone (NH)	0	0.00%
Native Hawaiian or Pacific Islander alone (NH)	0	0.00%
Other race alone (NH)	0	0.00%
Mixed race or Multiracial (NH)	29	6.95%
Hispanic or Latino (any race)	47	11.27%
Total	417	100.00%
