= Zion, South Carolina =

- Census-designated place
- Location within South Carolina Location within the United States
- Coordinates: 34°15′32″N 79°18′42″W
- Country: United States
- State: South Carolina
- County: Marion

Area
  - Total: 0.36 sq mi (0.92 km^{2})
  - Land: 0.36 sq mi (0.92 km^{2})
  - Water: 0 sq mi (0.00 km^{2})
- Elevation: 105 ft (32 m)

Population (2020)
  - Total: 136
  - Density: 383.4/sq mi (148.04/km^{2})
- Time zone: UTC-5 (Eastern (EST))
  - Summer (DST): UTC-4 (EDT)
- ZIP Code: 29574 (Mullins)
- Area codes: 843/854
- FIPS code: 45-79720
- GNIS feature ID: 2812976

Zion is an unincorporated community and census-designated place (CDP) in Marion County, South Carolina, United States. It was first listed as a CDP prior to the 2020 census with a population of 136.

The CDP is in northern Marion County, on the southeast side of South Carolina Highway 41, which leads southwest 7 miles (11 km) to Marion, the county seat, and northeast 10 miles (16 km) to Lake View. Mullins is 6 miles (10 km) to the southeast via local roads.

== Demographics ==
Historical population
Census	Pop.	Note	%±
2020	136		—
U.S. Decennial Census; 2020

Zion first appeared as a census designated place in the 2020 U.S. census.

Zion CDP, South Carolina – Racial and ethnic composition Note: the US Census treats Hispanic/Latino as an ethnic category. This table excludes Latinos from the racial categories and assigns them to a separate category. Hispanics/Latinos may be of any race.
Race / Ethnicity (NH = Non-Hispanic)	Pop 2020	% 2020
White alone (NH)	12	8.82%
Black or African American alone (NH)	118	86.76%
Native American or Alaska Native alone (NH)	0	0.00%
Asian alone (NH)	3	2.21%
Native Hawaiian or Pacific Islander alone (NH)	0	0.00%
Other race alone (NH)	0	0.00%
Mixed race or Multiracial (NH)	0	0.00%
Hispanic or Latino (any race)	3	2.21%
Total	136	100.00%
