= Finklea, South Carolina =

- Census-designated place
- Location within South Carolina Location within the United States
- Coordinates: 34°06′06″N 78°59′41″W
- Country: United States
- State: South Carolina
- County: Horry

Area
  - Total: 2.69 sq mi (6.98 km^{2})
  - Land: 2.69 sq mi (6.98 km^{2})
  - Water: 0 sq mi (0.00 km^{2})
- Elevation: 79 ft (24 m)

Population (2020)
  - Total: 291
  - Density: 108/sq mi (41.7/km^{2})
- Time zone: UTC-5 (Eastern (EST))
  - Summer (DST): UTC-4 (EDT)
- ZIP Code: 29569 (Loris)
- Area codes: 843/854
- FIPS code: 45-25405
- GNIS feature ID: 2812962

Finklea is an unincorporated community and census-designated place (CDP) in Horry County, South Carolina, United States. As of the 2020 census it had a population of 291.

The CDP is in northern Horry County, at the intersection of South Carolina Highways 410, 917 and 9 Business. Highway 410 leads south 9 miles (14 km) to U.S. Route 701 at Baxter Forks and northeast 8 miles (13 km) to Tabor City, North Carolina, and Highway 917 leads northwest 19 miles (31 km) to Mullins. The Highway 9 business loop leads north with Highway 410 1 mile (1.6 km) to Highway 9 at Green Sea and southeast 6 miles (10 km) to Loris.

== Demographics ==
Historical population
Census	Pop.	Note	%±
2020	291		—
U.S. Decennial Census; 2020

Finklea first appeared as a census designated place in the 2020 U.S. census.

=== 2020 census ===
Finklea CDP, South Carolina – Racial and Ethnic Composition (NH = Non-Hispanic) Note: the US Census treats Hispanic/Latino as an ethnic category. This table excludes Latinos from the racial categories and assigns them to a separate category. Hispanics/Latinos may be of any race.
Race / Ethnicity	Pop 2020	% 2020
White alone (NH)	98	33.68%
Black or African American alone (NH)	185	63.57%
Native American or Alaska Native alone (NH)	0	0.00%
Asian alone (NH)	0	0.00%
Pacific Islander alone (NH)	0	0.00%
Some Other Race alone (NH)	0	0.00%
Mixed Race/Multi-Racial (NH)	5	1.72%
Hispanic or Latino (any race)	3	1.03%
Total	291	100.00%

== Education ==
Horry County School District is the sole school district in the county.
