= South Carolina Highway 410 =

State highway in South Carolina, United States

South Carolina Highway 410

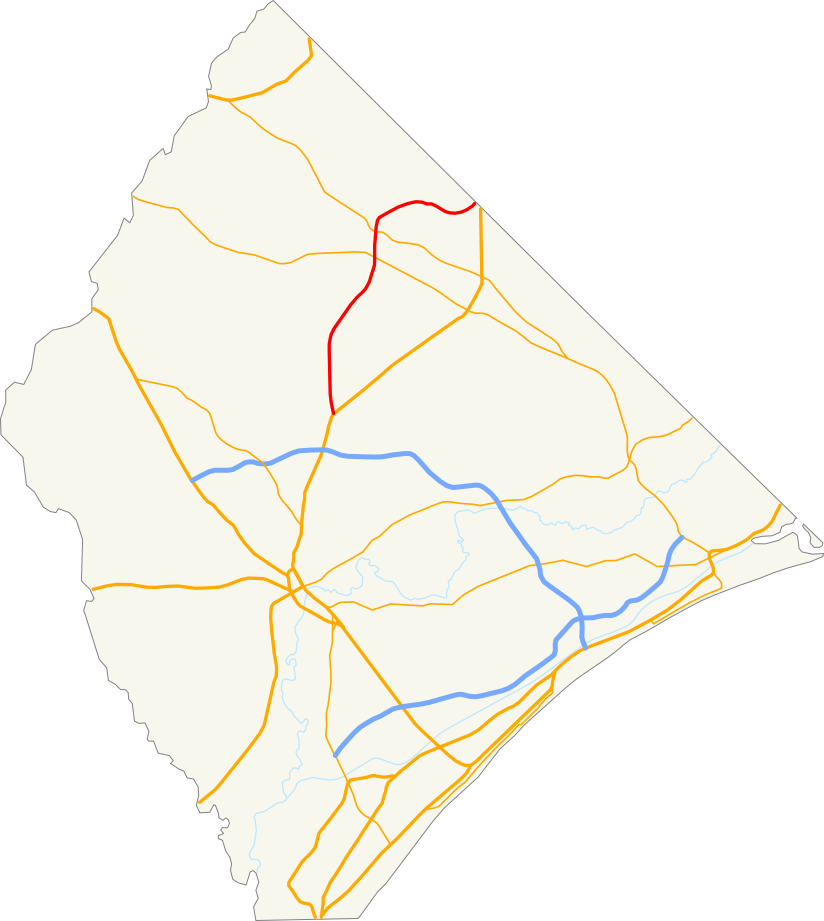
- Route of SC 410 highlighted in red

Route information
- Maintained by SCDOT
- Length: 17.460 mi (28.099 km)
- Existed: 1949–present

Major junctions
- South end: US 701 near Homewood
- SC 917 near Green Sea; SC 9 near Green Sea
- North end: NC 410 at the North Carolina state line near Tabor City, NC

Location
- Country: United States
- State: South Carolina
- Counties: Horry

Highway system
- South Carolina State Highway System; Interstate; US; State; Scenic
← SC 403	→ SC 412

South Carolina Highway 410 (SC 410) is a 17.460-mile (28.099 km) state highway in Horry County, in the northeastern part of the U.S. state of South Carolina. It travels from U.S. Route 701 (US 701) in the community of Baxter Forks north of SC 22 to the North Carolina state line.

== Route description ==
SC 410 starts at U.S. Route 701 at Baxter Forks and ends at the North Carolina state line, where the road continues as NC 410 into Tabor City.

== Major intersections ==
The entire highway is in Horry County.

Location	mi	km	Destinations	Notes
Baxter Forks	0.000	0.000	US 701 – Loris, Conway, Myrtle Beach	Southern terminus
Finklea	9.400	15.128	SC 917 north / SC 9 Bus. south – Loris, Mullins	Northern end of SC 9 Bus. concurrency; southern terminus of SC 917; Deputy Sheriff Timothy Causey Memorial Intersection
Green Sea	11.360	18.282	SC 9 – Myrtle Beach, North Myrtle Beach, Dillon, Charlotte	Northern end of SC 9 Bus. concurrency; Lieutenant John Ronald Floyd Intersection
	17.460	28.099	NC 410 north (Green Sea Road) – Tabor City	Continuation into North Carolina
1.000 mi = 1.609 km; 1.000 km = 0.621 mi: Concurrency terminus
