= Peter Caulder =

Peter Caulder (born 1795) was a soldier in the War of 1812 and settler in Arkansas, until he and other African American residents were driven out of the state by an 1859 state law that forbade African Americans from residing in the state.

A native of Marion County, South Carolina, he served first in the state militia and then in the United States Army during the war. He married Eliza Hall.

Arkansas governor Asa Hutchinson proclaimed a Peter Caulder Remembrance Day. Historian Billy D. Higgins wrote a book about him. Caulder's name was added to the war memorial to the War of 1812 on the Arkansas Capitol grounds.
