= KDLC =

KDLC may refer to:

- KDLC (FM), a radio station (97.7 FM) licensed to serve Dulac, Louisiana, United States
- Dillon County Airport (ICAO code KDLC)
