= James W. Dillon House =

Historic house in South Carolina, United States

- U.S. National Register of Historic Places
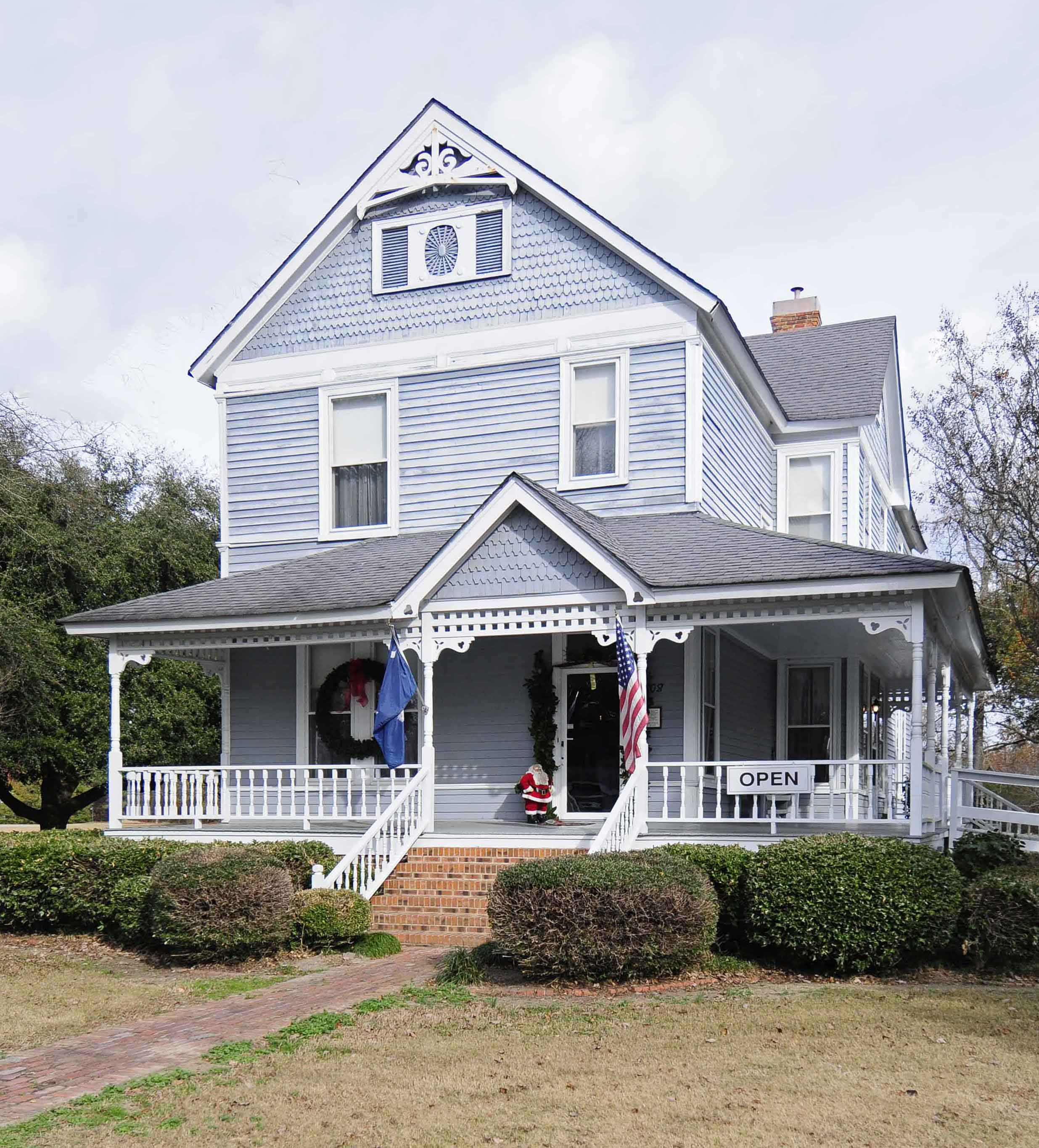
- James Dillon House, December 2012

- Location within South Carolina Location within the United States
- Location: 1302 W. Main St., Dillon, South Carolina
- Coordinates: 34°25′7″N 79°22′28″W
- Area: 1 acre (0.40 ha)
- Built: 1890
- Architectural style: Late Victorian
- NRHP reference No.: 71000769
- Added to NRHP: May 6, 1971

James W. Dillon House is a historic home located at Dillon, Dillon County, South Carolina. It was built in 1890, and is a two-story, white frame Late Victorian style dwelling. A one-story veranda extends across the façade and three-fourths of the southeast elevation. Other notable details include lattice work, carved posts with cornice braces, scalloped shingles in gables, and an ornate front gable with gingerbread trim. It was the home of James W. Dillon, founder of the town and man for whom the county was named.

It was listed on the National Register of Historic Places in 1971.

The house is owned by the Dillon County Historical Society and operated as an early 20th-century period historic house museum.
