= Brittons Neck, South Carolina =

Brittons Neck
- Unincorporated community
- Location within the state of South Carolina
- Coordinates: 33°54′46″N 79°20′29″W
- Country: United States
- State: South Carolina
- County: Marion County
- Elevation: 36 ft (11 m)
- Time zone: UTC-5 (Eastern (EST))
  - Summer (DST): UTC-4 (EDT)
- ZIP code: 29546
- Area codes: 843, 854
- GNIS feature ID: 1231086

Brittons Neck is an unincorporated community in Marion County, South Carolina, United States. It is located in the southern part of Marion County on SC 908, south of Centenary and north of US 378. It is also approximately halfway between the major cities of Florence and Myrtle Beach.

One of the oldest settlements in Marion County, Brittons Neck lay between the Great and the Little Pee Dee Rivers, extending northward from the mouth of the Little Pee Dee River. It was named for Francis, Timothy, Daniel, Moses, Joseph, and Philip Britton, who settled in the neck about 1735–1736. They were the sons of Francis Britton, who was in Carolina by 1697. Britton's Ferry sat at the junction of the Williamsburg, Georgetown, and Marion County lines.

The ferry was established by Francis Britton and two other commissioners under an act of 1747. Britton's Neck was the center of patriot sympathy during the American Revolution, making the ferry important to both sides.

Brittons Neck Elementary School is located near the community.
