= South Carolina Highway 908 =

State highway in South Carolina, United States

South Carolina Highway 908

Route information
- Maintained by SCDOT
- Length: 7.610 mi (12.247 km)

Major junctions
- South end: US 378 near Johnsonville
- North end: SC 41 near Centenary

Location
- Country: United States
- State: South Carolina
- Counties: Marion

Highway system
- South Carolina State Highway System; Interstate; US; State; Scenic
← SC 905	→ SC 909

South Carolina Highway 908 (SC 908) is a 7.610-mile (12.247 km) state highway in the U.S. state of South Carolina. The highway connects rural areas of Marion County with Brittons Neck.

== Route description ==
SC 908 begins at a skewed intersection with U.S. Route 378 (US 378) northeast of Johnsonville, Marion County, where the roadway continues south as a dirt road to the Woodbury Wildlife Management Area. It travels to the north-northwest and curves to a nearly due north direction. Just before it travels through Brittons Neck, it curves to the north-northwest and crosses Alligator Run. In the community, it passes a U.S. Post Office. Just after crossing Marsh Creek, it meets its northern terminus, an intersection with SC 41 at a point south of Centenary.

== Major intersections ==
The entire route is in Marion County.

Location	mi	km	Destinations	Notes
	0.000	0.000	US 378 – Lake City, Conway	Southern terminus
	7.610	12.247	SC 41 – Charleston	Northern terminus
1.000 mi = 1.609 km; 1.000 km = 0.621 mi
