= Ariel Crossroad, South Carolina =

Ariel Crossroad
- Unincorporated community
- Nicknames: Ariel Crossroads, Arial Crossroad
- Location within the state of South Carolina
- Coordinates: 34°04′35″N 79°18′10″W
- Country: United States
- State: South Carolina
- County: Marion

Area
  - Total: 4.6 sq mi (12 km^{2})
  - Land: 4.6 sq mi (12 km^{2})
  - Water: 0.0 sq mi (0 km^{2})
- Elevation: 89 ft (27 m)

Population (2023)
  - Total: 2,024
  - Density: 443.8/sq mi (171.4/km^{2})
- Time zone: UTC-5 (Eastern (EST))
  - Summer (DST): UTC-4 (EDT)
- ZIP code: 29571
- Area codes: 843, 854
- GNIS feature ID: 1244923

Ariel Crossroad is an unincorporated community in Marion County, South Carolina, United States, located at the intersection of US 501 and SC 41, 9 miles (14 km) southeast of Marion. West of the Little Pee Dee River, the area is a predominantly farming community. Variant names include Arial Cross Roads, Arial Crossroads, Arials Crossroads and Ariel Cross Roads.
