= Dillon County Airport =

- IATA: DLL; ICAO: KDLC; FAA LID: DLC

Summary
- Airport type: Public
- Owner: Dillon County
- Serves: Dillon, South Carolina
- Elevation AMSL: 133 ft (41 m)
- Coordinates: 34°26′57″N 079°22′07″W
- Interactive map of Dillon County Airport

Runways
Direction	Length		Surface
Direction	ft	m	Surface
7/25	3,000	914	Asphalt

Statistics (2007)
- Aircraft operations: 2,100
- Source: Federal Aviation Administration

Dillon County Airport (IATA: DLL, ICAO: KDLC, FAA LID: DLC) is a county-owned public-use airport located three nautical miles (6 km) north of the central business district of Dillon, a city in Dillon County, South Carolina, United States.

Although most U.S. airports use the same three-letter location identifier for the FAA and IATA, this airport is assigned DLC by the FAA and DLL by the IATA (which assigned DLC to Dalian Zhoushuizi International Airport in Dalian, Liaoning, People's Republic of China).

== Facilities and aircraft ==
Dillon County Airport covers an area of 32 acres (13 ha) at an elevation of 133 feet (41 m) above mean sea level. It has one asphalt paved runway designated 7/25 which measures 3,000 by 60 feet (914 x 18 m). For the 12-month period ending April 5, 2007, the airport had 2,100 aircraft operations, an average of 175 per month: 95% general aviation and 5% military.

== See also ==
- List of airports in South Carolina
