= Friendship, South Carolina =

Friendship
- unincorporated community
- Location within the state of South Carolina
- Coordinates: 34°01′01″N 79°26′07″W
- Country: United States
- State: South Carolina
- County: Marion County
- Elevation: 49 ft (15 m)
- Time zone: UTC-5 (Eastern (EST))
  - Summer (DST): UTC-4 (EDT)
- GNIS feature ID: 1222566

Friendship is an unincorporated community in Marion County, South Carolina, United States.

St. Paul Baptist Church is located in Friendship.

Herbert Woods, co-founder of Sylvia's Restaurant of Harlem, lived in Friendship as a child.
