= Hamer, South Carolina =

- Census-designated place
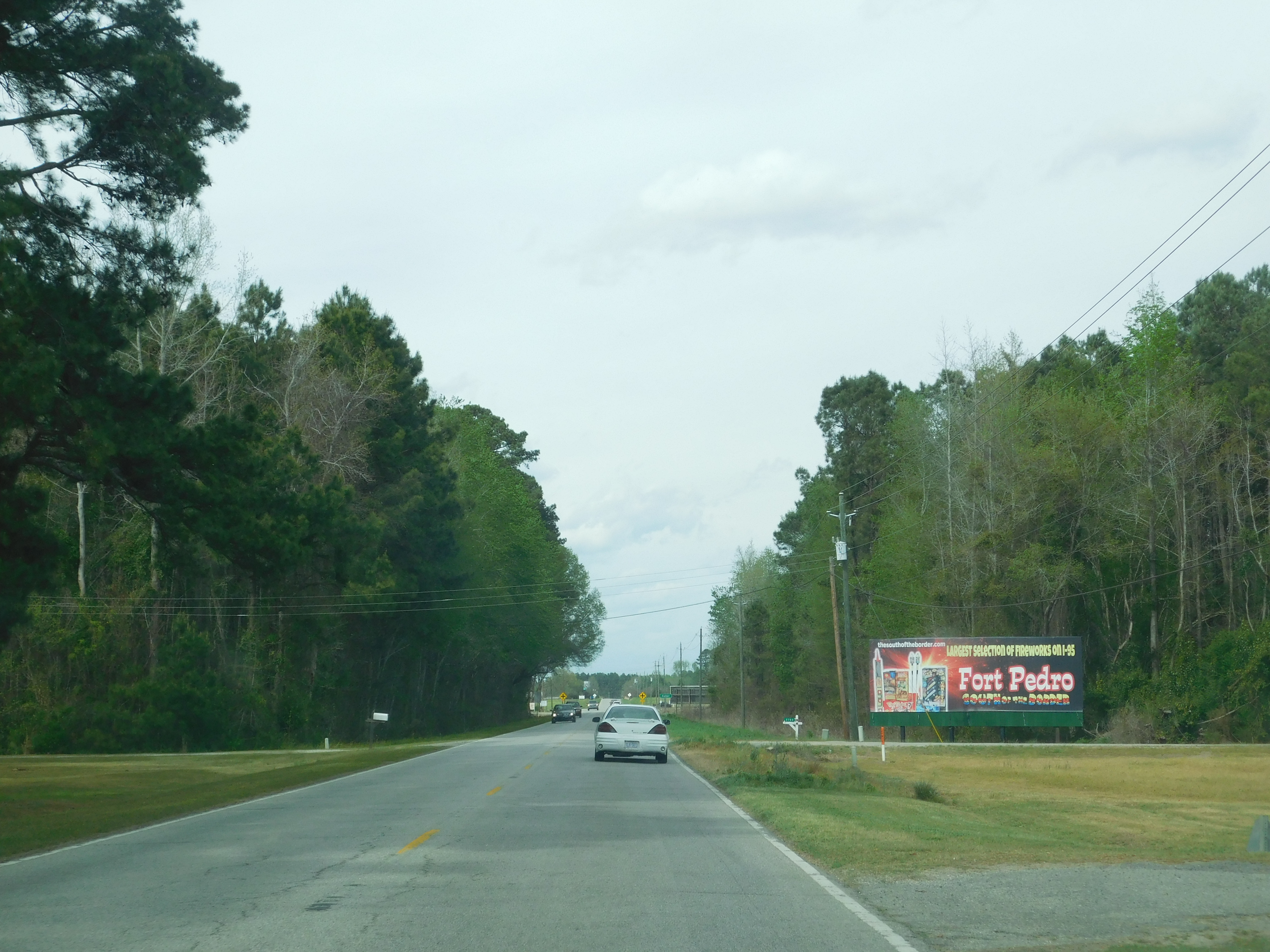
- Driving northbound on US 301-501 just before entering Hamer.

- Location within the state of South Carolina
- Coordinates: 34°29′12″N 79°19′02″W
- Country: United States
- State: South Carolina
- County: Dillon

Area
  - Total: 5.06 sq mi (13.10 km^{2})
  - Land: 5.04 sq mi (13.06 km^{2})
  - Water: 0.015 sq mi (0.04 km^{2})
- Elevation: 138 ft (42 m)

Population (2020)
  - Total: 820
  - Density: 163/sq mi (62.8/km^{2})
- Time zone: UTC-5 (Eastern (EST))
  - Summer (DST): UTC-4 (EDT)
- ZIP code: 29547
- Area codes: 843 and 854
- FIPS code: 45-31660
- GNIS feature ID: 2812951

Hamer is an unincorporated community and census-designated place (CDP) in Dillon County, South Carolina, United States. It was first listed as a CDP in the 2020 census with a population of 820.

Hamer is home to Hamer Hall, a residence from 1890 listed on the National Register of Historic Places. It is also the location of South of the Border, a famed tourist trap just before the state line with North Carolina; and it is the home of Blenheim Ginger Ale.

== Geography ==
Its elevation is 144 feet (44 m).

== Demographics ==
Historical population
Census	Pop.	Note	%±
2020	820		—
U.S. Decennial Census; 2020

Hamer first appeared as a census designated place in the 2020 U.S. census.

=== 2020 census ===
Hamer CDP, South Carolina – Demographic Profile (NH = Non-Hispanic)
Race / Ethnicity	Pop 2020	% 2020
White alone (NH)	402	49.02%
Black or African American alone (NH)	321	39.15%
Native American or Alaska Native alone (NH)	23	2.80%
Asian alone (NH)	4	0.49%
Pacific Islander alone (NH)	0	0.00%
Some Other Race alone (NH)	3	0.37%
Mixed Race/Multi-Racial (NH)	30	3.66%
Hispanic or Latino (any race)	37	4.51%
Total	820	100.00%

Note: the US Census treats Hispanic/Latino as an ethnic category. This table excludes Latinos from the racial categories and assigns them to a separate category. Hispanics/Latinos can be of any race.
