= 1940 United States presidential election in South Carolina =

- November 5, 1940

Nominee	Franklin D. Roosevelt	Wendell Willkie
Party	Democratic	Republican
Alliance	-	Jeffersonian Democratic; Tolbert
Home state	New York	New York
Running mate	Henry A. Wallace	Charles L. McNary
Electoral vote	8	0
Popular vote	95,470	4,360
Percentage	95.63%	4.36%
County results
Roosevelt
80–90%
90–100%
President before election
Franklin D. Roosevelt
Democratic
Elected President
Franklin D. Roosevelt
Democratic

The 1940 United States presidential election in South Carolina took place on November 5, 1940. All contemporary 48 states were part of the 1940 United States presidential election. State voters chose eight electors to the Electoral College, which selected the president and vice president.

South Carolina was won by incumbent Democratic President Franklin D. Roosevelt of New York, who was running against Republican businessman Wendell Willkie of New York. Roosevelt ran with Henry A. Wallace of Iowa as his running mate, and Willkie ran with Senator Charles L. McNary of Oregon. Notably, Communist Party USA candidate Earl Browder was on the ballot in every county, but failed to win a single vote in the entire state.

Roosevelt won South Carolina by a landslide margin of 91.27 points. This was the last time that a candidate carried 95% or more of the vote, alongside Mississippi, as the best performance in DC so far was Barack Obama in 2008 with 92.46% of the vote.

== Results ==
1940 United States presidential election in South Carolina
Party	Candidate	Running mate	Popular vote		Electoral vote	
Party	Candidate	Running mate	Count	%	Count	%
Democratic	Franklin Delano Roosevelt of New York	Henry Agard Wallace of Iowa	95,470	95.63%	8	100.00%
Fusion	Wendell Willkie	Charles Linza McNary	4,360 (Note: Willkie total is a fusion of 2,496 "Jeffersonian Democratic", 1,727 "Republican" and 137 "Tolbert" elector ticket votes)	4.36%	0	0.00%
Write-in	Roger Ward Babson of Massachusetts	Edgar Moorman of Illinois	2	0.01%	0	0.00%
Communist	Earl Browder of New York	William Z. Foster of Massachusetts	0	0.00%	0	0.00%
Total			99,832	100.00%	8	100.00%

=== Results by county ===
1940 United States presidential election in South Carolina by county
County	Franklin Delano Roosevelt Democratic		Wendell Lewis Willkie Fusion		Earl Russell Browder Communist		Margin		Total votes cast
County	#	%	#	%	#	%	#	%	Total votes cast
Abbeville	1,007	96.92%	32	3.08%	0	0.00%	975	93.84%	1,039
Aiken	2,772	96.89%	89	3.11%	0	0.00%	2,683	93.78%	2,861
Allendale	905	96.79%	30	3.21%	0	0.00%	875	93.58%	935
Anderson	3,763	97.77%	86	2.23%	0	0.00%	3,677	95.54%	3,849
Bamberg	904	98.58%	13	1.42%	0	0.00%	891	97.16%	917
Barnwell	1,845	99.30%	13	0.70%	0	0.00%	1,832	98.60%	1,858
Beaufort	582	86.48%	91	13.52%	0	0.00%	491	72.96%	673
Berkeley	490	84.34%	91	15.66%	0	0.00%	399	68.68%	581
Calhoun	657	99.55%	3	0.45%	0	0.00%	654	99.10%	660
Charleston	8,145	85.58%	1,372	14.42%	0	0.00%	6,773	71.16%	9,517
Cherokee	2,069	98.29%	36	1.71%	0	0.00%	2,033	96.58%	2,105
Chester	1,930	98.22%	35	1.78%	0	0.00%	1,895	96.44%	1,965
Chesterfield	2,880	99.31%	20	0.69%	0	0.00%	2,860	98.62%	2,900
Clarendon	1,154	95.53%	54	4.47%	0	0.00%	1,100	91.06%	1,208
Colleton	1,197	94.85%	65	5.15%	0	0.00%	1,132	89.70%	1,262
Darlington	1,395	95.88%	60	4.12%	0	0.00%	1,335	91.76%	1,455
Dillon	868	97.20%	25	2.80%	0	0.00%	843	94.40%	893
Dorchester	993	90.03%	110	9.97%	0	0.00%	883	80.06%	1,103
Edgefield	1,065	99.16%	9	0.84%	0	0.00%	1,056	98.32%	1,074
Fairfield	848	97.70%	20	2.30%	0	0.00%	828	95.40%	868
Florence	2,597	96.47%	95	3.53%	0	0.00%	2,502	92.94%	2,692
Georgetown	1,503	90.65%	155	9.35%	0	0.00%	1,348	81.30%	1,658
Greenville	8,118	94.05%	514	5.95%	0	0.00%	7,604	88.10%	8,632
Greenwood	2,914	98.68%	39	1.32%	0	0.00%	2,875	97.36%	2,953
Hampton	1,198	98.04%	24	1.96%	0	0.00%	1,174	96.08%	1,222
Horry	2,111	92.79%	164	7.21%	0	0.00%	1,947	85.58%	2,275
Jasper	418	91.07%	41	8.93%	0	0.00%	377	82.14%	459
Kershaw	1,174	98.32%	20	1.68%	0	0.00%	1,154	96.64%	1,194
Lancaster	3,205	99.57%	14	0.43%	0	0.00%	3,191	99.14%	3,219
Laurens	2,697	98.54%	40	1.46%	0	0.00%	2,657	97.08%	2,737
Lee	825	97.63%	20	2.37%	0	0.00%	805	95.26%	845
Lexington	1,496	98.88%	17	1.12%	0	0.00%	1,479	97.76%	1,513
Marion	716	97.55%	18	2.45%	0	0.00%	698	95.10%	734
Marlboro	526	97.59%	13	2.41%	0	0.00%	513	95.18%	539
McCormick	419	97.44%	11	2.56%	0	0.00%	408	94.88%	430
Newberry	1,739	98.03%	35	1.97%	0	0.00%	1,704	96.06%	1,774
Oconee	1,593	91.76%	143	8.24%	0	0.00%	1,450	83.52%	1,736
Orangeburg	2,356	97.68%	56	2.32%	0	0.00%	2,300	95.36%	2,412
Pickens	2,122	96.54%	76	3.46%	0	0.00%	2,046	93.08%	2,198
Richland	4,781	96.62%	167	3.38%	0	0.00%	4,614	93.24%	4,948
Saluda	1,115	98.67%	15	1.33%	0	0.00%	1,100	97.34%	1,130
Spartanburg	9,119	97.35%	248	2.65%	0	0.00%	8,871	94.70%	9,367
Union	3,662	99.21%	29	0.79%	0	0.00%	3,633	98.42%	3,691
Williamsburg	1,089	96.97%	34	3.03%	0	0.00%	1,055	93.94%	1,123
York	2,508	95.51%	118	4.49%	0	0.00%	2,390	91.02%	2,626
Sumter (Note: No returns were canvassed for Sumter County and voters in this county were listed in neighbouring counties)	0	N/A	0	N/A	0	N/A	N/A	N/A	0
Totals	95,470	95.63%	4,360	4.37%	0	0.00%	91,110	91.26%	99,832 (Note: There were two write-in votes for Prohibition Party nominee Roger Ward Babson not tabulated by county.)
