= Little Pee Dee State Park =

State park in South Carolina, United States

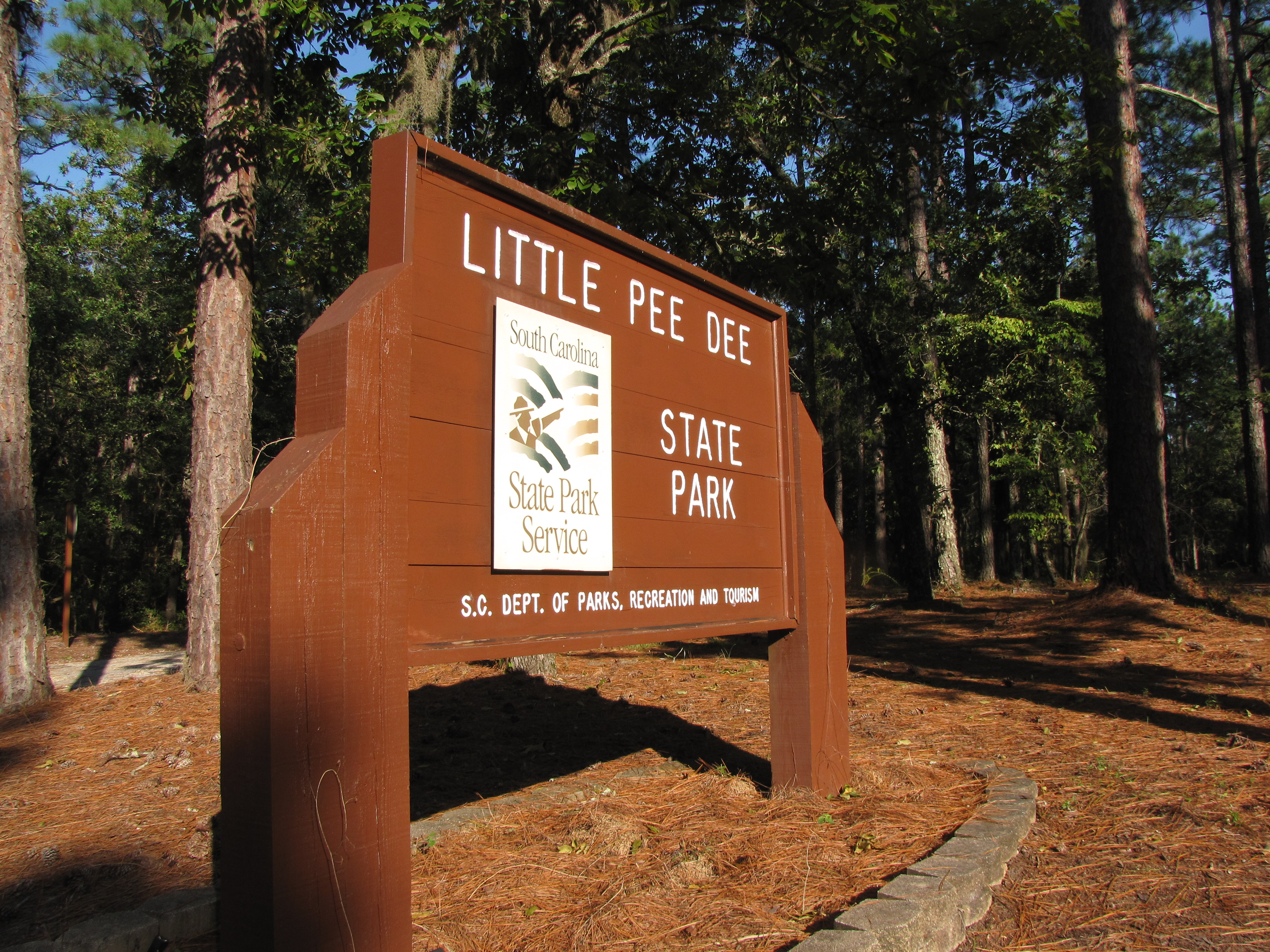
- Interactive map of Little Pee Dee State Park
- Nearest city: Dillon, SC
- Coordinates: 34°19′32″N 79°16′29″W
- Area: 835 acres (3 km^{2})
- Camp sites: tent and RV sites, primitive group camping area
- Hiking trails: 1.3-mile Beaver Pond Nature Trail

Little Pee Dee State Park is a state park located near the town of Dillon in Dillon County, South Carolina. The park land includes a part of a Carolina Bay and adjacent sand rim. Recent work by the U.S. Geological Survey has interpreted the Carolina Bays as relict thermokarst lakes that formed several thousands of years ago when the climate was colder, drier, and windier. Thermokarst lakes develop by thawing of frozen ground (permafrost) and by subsequent modification by wind and water. Thus, this interpretation suggests that permafrost once extended as far south as the Carolina Bays during the last ice age and (or) previous ice ages.

== Activities and amenities ==
Activities available at the park include picnicking, fishing in the 54-acre Lake Norton or in the Little Pee Dee River, bird watching, boating, geocaching, biking and camping.

Amenities include a playground, picnic shelters, a 75-foot fishing pier on the lake and a park store.

A boat ramp on the lake allows access to private boats. Boats are limited to electric trolling motors only. Gas powered motor boats are not allowed.

Visitors can rent canoes, kayaks and johnboats on a half-day or daily basis from the park office.
