= Little Pee Dee River =

Coordinates: 34.552095°N 79.4485998°W

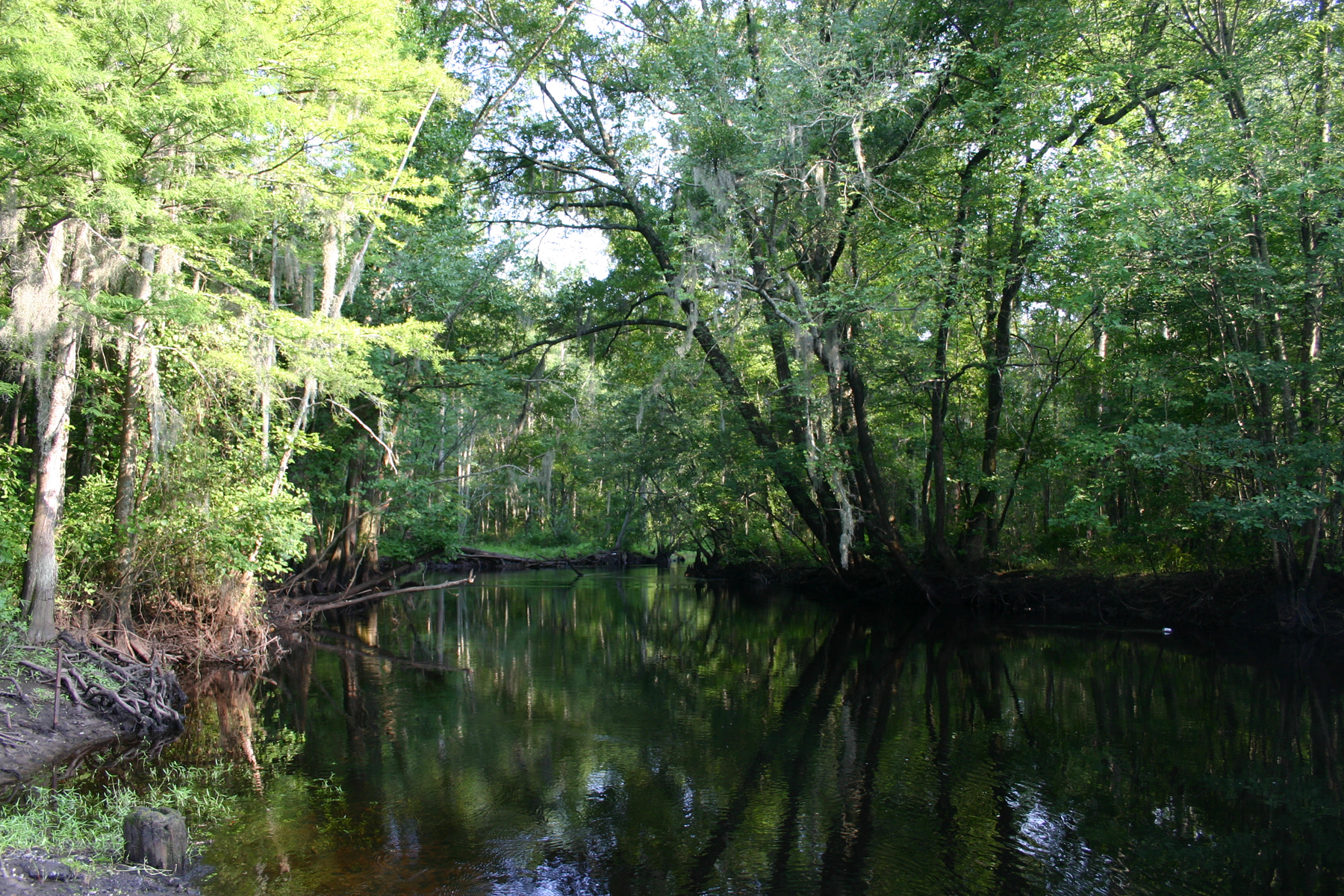
Little Pee Dee River at Dillon, South Carolina

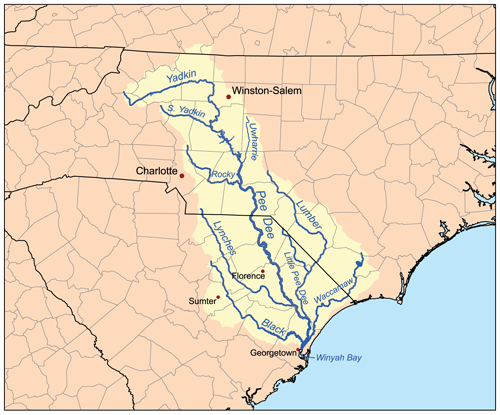
Map of the Pee Dee River watershed showing the Little Pee Dee.

The Little Pee Dee River is a 116-mile-long (187 km) tributary of the Pee Dee River (which originates in the Appalachian Mountains where it is known as the Yadkin River). The Little Pee Dee technically arises near Laurinburg, North Carolina as Gum Swamp, which flows southward, receiving several small tributaries, across the South Carolina border into Red Bluff Lake, near McColl, South Carolina. The lake is at an elevation of 135 feet (41 m) above sea level, and from the outlet of the lake, the flow is called the Little Pee Dee River. The Little Pee Dee River is named after the Pee Dee Indian Tribe. Today, the tribe still occupies some of the land, although the tribe only consists of just over 200 enrolled members.

The Little Pee Dee is a sluggish meandering blackwater river that ranges between 10 and 25 feet (3 and 8 m) wide and 6 to 10 feet (2 to 3 m) deep in its upper reaches. It is navigable only by canoe or other small craft. Some parts of the Little Pee Dee River are nearly blocked by low-hanging tree branches. It is bordered by a swamp area that features bald cypress, sweetgum, oak, tupelo and other hardwoods. It flows southeastward, roughly paralleling the state border until it receives the somewhat larger Lumber River (a National Wild and Scenic River) near Nichols, South Carolina, from which the much larger river flows more nearly southward until it joins with the Pee Dee near Yauhannah, South Carolina.

Part of the lower section has been designated a Scenic River by the South Carolina Department of Natural Resources. It features deep channels, slow moving water, and white sandy bars and beaches. Cooters, sunning on logs, are a common sight. Other wildlife is abundant, including alligators, beavers, deer, and wood ducks. Less common species like bald eagles, pileated woodpeckers, and prothonotary warblers, can be spotted with a little luck. The river also offers excellent fishing. A Boating Guide to the Little Pee Dee is available from the South Carolina Department of Natural Resources. It covers the history of the river, its flora and fauna as well as a listing of access points and boating information.

The Little Pee Dee runs its entire length through coastal lands of low relief that are pockmarked with Carolina bays. Down river from Dillon, South Carolina is Little Pee Dee State Park. Adjacent to this is the Little Pee Dee Heritage Preserve which is a Carolina bay that has been preserved as natural as possible.
