= Temperance Hill, South Carolina =

- unincorporated community
- Location within South Carolina
- Coordinates: 34.289°N 79.38°W
- Country: United States
- State: South Carolina
- County: Marion
- Elevation: 121 ft (37 m)

Population (2020)
  - Total: 2,368
- Time zone: UTC-5 (Eastern (EST))
  - Summer (DST): UTC-4 (EDT)
- ZIP code: 29571
- Area codes: 843, 854
- GNIS feature ID: 1231855

Temperance Hill is an unincorporated community in Marion County, South Carolina, United States. Its population, according to the 2020 census, is 2,368.

== Geography ==
Temperance Hill is located at latitude 34.289 and longitude –79.38. The elevation is 121 feet.
