= South of the Border (attraction) =

Roadside attraction in South Carolina

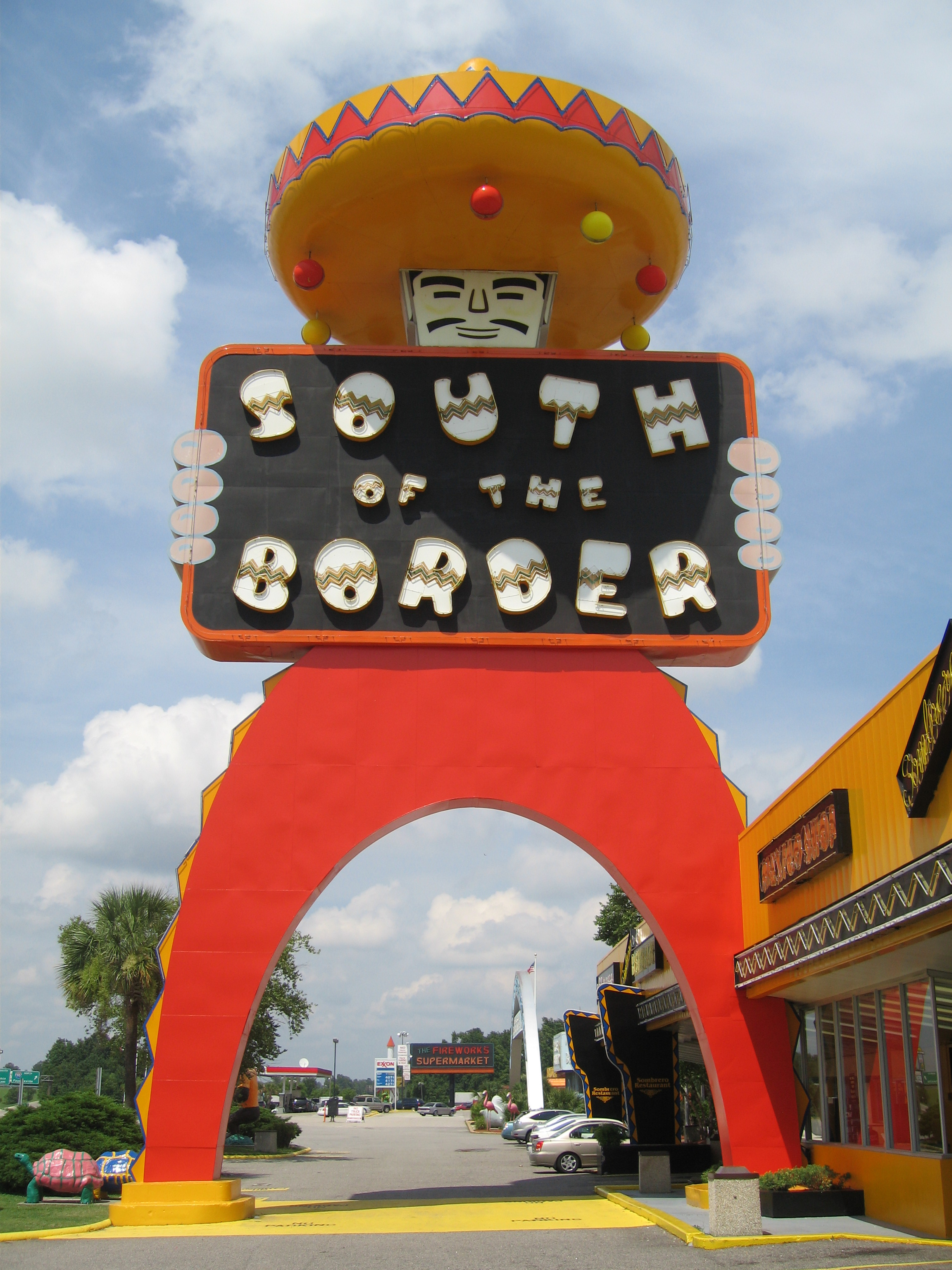
- South of the Border's large welcome sign
- Interactive map of South of the Border
- Location: Hamer, South Carolina, United States
- Coordinates: 34°29′52″N 79°18′35″W
- Opened: 1949 (77 years ago)
- Owner: Alan Schafer (1949–2001); Ryan Schafer (2001–)

South of the Border is an attraction on Interstate 95 (I-95), US Highway 301 (US 301) and US 501 in Hamer, South Carolina, United States, just south of Rowland, North Carolina. It is so named because it is just south of the border between North Carolina and South Carolina. The area is themed in faux-Mexican style, alluding to Mexico's location south of its border with the United States. The rest area contains restaurants, gas stations, a video arcade, motel, truck stop, a small amusement park, a mini golf course, shopping, fireworks stores, and a motocross training complex. Its mascot is Pedro, a caricature of a Mexican bandito. South of the Border is known for its roadside billboard advertisements, which begin many miles away and incorporate a mileage countdown to the attraction itself.

== Design ==
The entire motif of South of the Border can be described as intentionally campy. South of the Border is located at the intersection of I-95 and US 301/US 501 just south of the border between North Carolina and South Carolina. The site is a 350-acre (140 ha) compound that contains a miniature golf course, truck stop, 300-room motel, multiple souvenir shops, a campground, multiple restaurants, amusement rides, and a 200-foot (61 m) observation tower with a sombrero-shaped observation deck. It is also home to "Reptile Lagoon", the largest indoor reptile exhibit in the U.S.

Architectural features include "a Jetsons-esque starburst chandelier" in the lobby and mimetic architecture. Pedro's Pleasure Dome is a swimming pool inside "a junkyard version" of a geodesic dome. A Washington Post review says, "[F]lashing signs ... throw technicolor pink and green and blue onto every surface. No destination or sentiment is too small to be blared out in bright orange." Numerous large statues of animals such as dolphins, horses, dogs, gorillas and dinosaurs can be found. The Peddler Steakhouse, the nicest of the restaurants, is shaped like a sombrero, while the Mexican-themed Sombrero restaurant is not, though its décor includes sombreros, cactus and terra cotta, with lots of lime green. There are areas that bring to mind the photography of William Eggleston, the cinematography of David Lynch, and the gas station art of Ed Ruscha.

The venue is also home to a motocross training facility. South of the Border Motocross (SOBMX) is used for riders in training and a competitive race course, hosting AMA-sanctioned regional races, featuring in the winter a Monster Energy AMA Amateur National Motocross Championship regional qualifier where winners earn bids to the races at Loretta Lynn's Ranch in Tennessee. There are four circuits—a 1.4-mile (2.3 km) motocross track, a Supercross training facility, an Arenacross training facility, and a second 1.1-mile (1.8 km) motocross track. By insurance regulations, only licensed AMA or FIM professional riders are permitted on the Supercross or Arenacross circuits.

== History ==
South of the Border was developed by Alan Schafer in 1950. He had founded South of the Border Depot, a beer stand, at the location in 1949 adjacent to Robeson County which was, at one time, one of many dry North Carolina counties. Business was steadily expanded with Mexican trinkets and numerous kitsch items imported from Mexico. The site itself also began to expand to include a cocktail lounge, gas station and souvenir shop and, in 1954, a motel. In 1962, South of the Border expanded into fireworks sales, potentially capitalizing on the fact fireworks were illegal in North Carolina. In 1964 it was announced that the route for I-95 would pass right by South of the Border, and the facility would be next to two exits and within view of the highway. By the mid-1960s, South of the Border had expanded to include a barber shop, drug store, a variety store, a post office, an outdoor go-kart track complete with other outdoor recreational facilities and the 104 feet (32 m) tall image of the mascot, Pedro.

Nearby Dillon was once known as the "Wedding Capital of the East" because South Carolina allowed people as young as 14 to get married and did not have other requirements. Many couples who got married there went to South of the Border for their honeymoons.

Over the years, the billboards with messages some considered racist and offensive changed to become tamer while still retaining the same tongue-in-cheek tone. Schafer continued to deny his attraction was racist, citing the fact that he was known for hiring African Americans, and even helping them to vote, and standing up to the Ku Klux Klan.

About 300 people, mostly local employees, work at South of the Border. At one time, with 700 working there, it was the largest employer in Dillon County, South Carolina.

In 2025 South of the Border put approximately 30 acres of the attraction's property up for sale. Included in the offering are 20 acres of undeveloped land, a motel building, the former casino and convention center buildings, and a former amusement park space. The remainder of the attraction is slated to continue operating as is.

== Incidents ==
On April 26, 2026, at around 9:30 p.m., the Dillon County Fire Department was alerted to a fire from the Burrito Loco restaurant (formerly the Hot Tamale). When firefighters arrived, they noticed fire coming from the roof of the building. The DCFD and the Rowland, North Carolina, Volunteer Fire Department were able to temporarily extinguish the fire, which caused only minimal damage. However, at around 2:30 a.m. on April 27, 2026, the DCFD and Rowland VFD were alerted to another fire coming from the same building. It engulfed the entire building due to windy conditions. Firefighters were on scene for four hours, but the building's roof caved in, causing the building to be a total loss. It is presumed to have been an electrical fire.

== Mascot ==
Initially, Schafer only used sombreros and serapes in advertisements for South of the Border. However, after Schafer hired two men he had met on a business trip to Mexico as bellboys, people began calling them Pedro and Pancho, leading to the development of the Pedro mascot. Schafer eventually created Pedro, an exaggerated, cartoon-like representation of a Mexican bandit, to add to the exotic element and theme of the attraction. Pedro wears a sombrero, a poncho and a large mustache. Minstrel shows were still popular in Dillon County in the 1940s and 1950s, at about the time Pedro was created and P. Nicole King argues that Pedro embodies the way in which people exoticized Mexico or Mexicans at the time while working within the themes of camp.

Pedro has likewise been referred to as culturally offensive, politically incorrect or racist. P. Nicole King described Pedro's likeness as a "southern Jewish guy in brown face" that was perhaps made, partially, in Schafer's image. Schafer himself had previously dismissed criticism that Pedro is an unfair characterization of Mexicans and argued that Pedro's design is a light-hearted joke. Today, all South of the Border employees, regardless of race, are referred to as "Pedro".

== Pop culture ==
American storyteller, radio and TV personality Jean Shepherd began his TV movie The Great American Fourth of July and Other Disasters with a trip to South of the Border. He stops at a fireworks market called Fort Pedro, which leads him into the story of the most memorable Fourth of July during his childhood in the fictional town of Hohman, Indiana.

In the Rugrats episode "Where's Grandpa?," Lou Pickles mistakes a Canada-themed roadside attraction named "North of the Border" for Canada itself. The fictional attractions are similar to those of the real South of the Border attractions.

The opening scene of Season 3, Episode 5 of Eastbound & Down shows characters Eduardo Sanchez Powers and Casper robbing a Mexican store leading the viewers to believe they were still in Mexico. The scene later reveals they were actually robbing the gift shop at South of the Border and are now traveling in the United States.

In Impractical Jokers: The Movie, the Jokers leave Q at a motel, to have him ride on horseback to South of the Border where the rest of the Jokers await him.

In the movie Forces of Nature (1999), starring Sandra Bullock and Ben Affleck, the main characters stop at South of the Border as passengers on a tour bus.

In a Futurama episode that aired in early October 2025, the attraction's sign was changed from "South of the Border" to "South of the Bordersphere". In the episode, the sign is held by a large astronaut, mirroring the attraction's real-life mascot (see above).

The plot of the film Nacho Chihuahua (1999) revolves around a chihuahua named Nacho running away from his owner and attempting to make his way to South of the Border.

== See also ==
- Breezewood, Pennsylvania
- Carowinds
- Ethnic stereotype
- Tourist trap
- Wall Drug, a similar attraction off Interstate 90 in South Dakota
