= Dillon County, South Carolina =

County in South Carolina, United States

- County
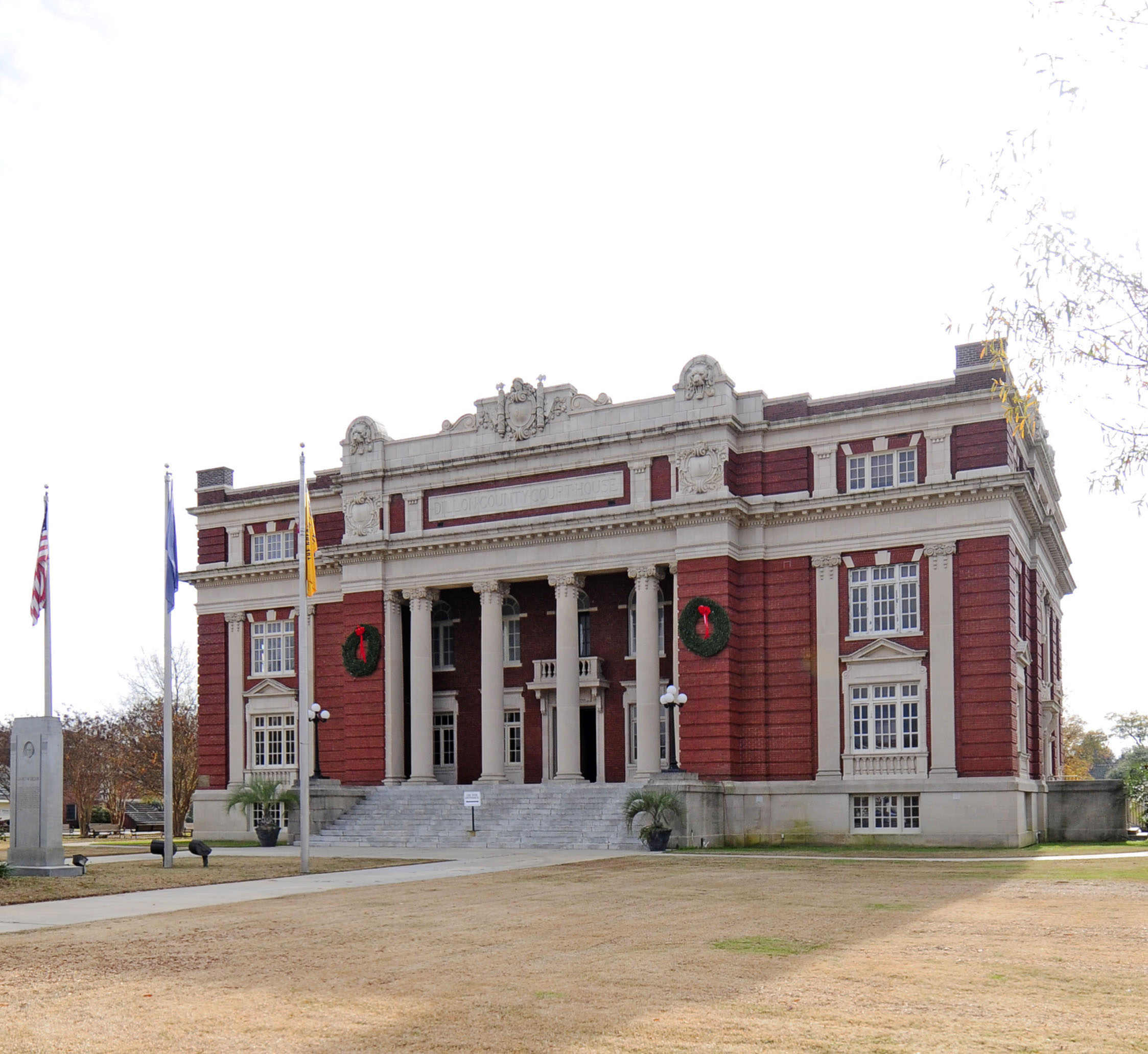
- Dillon County Courthouse

- Flag Seal
- Nickname: The Golden Land
- Location within the U.S. state of South Carolina
- Interactive map of Dillon County, South Carolina
- Coordinates: 34.39°N 79.37°W
- Country: United States
- State: South Carolina
- Founded: 1910
- Named for: James W. Dillon
- Seat: Dillon
- Largest community: Dillon

Area
  - Total: 406.82 sq mi (1,053.7 km^{2})
  - Land: 405.07 sq mi (1,049.1 km^{2})
  - Water: 1.75 sq mi (4.5 km^{2}) 0.43%

Population (2020)
  - Total: 28,292
  - Estimate (2025): 27,458 ▼
  - Density: 69.845/sq mi (26.967/km^{2})
- Time zone: UTC−5 (Eastern)
  - Summer (DST): UTC−4 (EDT)
- Congressional district: 7th
- Website: www.dilloncountysc.org

Dillon County is a county located in the U.S. state of South Carolina. As of the 2020 census, the county's population was 28,292. The county seat is Dillon.

== History ==
Founded in 1910 from a portion of Marion County, both Dillon County and the city of Dillon were named for prosperous local citizen James W. Dillon (1826–1913), an Irishman who settled there and led a campaign to bring the railroad into the community. The result of this effort was the construction of the Wilson Short Cut Railroad, which later became part of the Atlantic Coast Line Railroad. It stimulated greater prosperity directly linking Dillon County to the national network of railroads.

== Geography ==
According to the U.S. Census Bureau, the county has a total area of 406.82 square miles (1,053.7 km^{2}), of which 405.07 square miles (1,049.1 km^{2}) is land and 1.75 square miles (4.5 km^{2}) (0.43%) is water. It is the fifth-smallest county in South Carolina by area.

=== State and local protected areas/sites ===
- Bass Community Park
- Dillon County Museum
- Little Pee Dee State Park
- Little Pee Dee State Park Bay Heritage Preserve

=== Major water bodies ===
- Cud Swamp
- Great Pee Dee River
- Little Pee Dee River
- Lumber River
- Maidendown Swamp
- Reedy Creek

=== Adjacent counties ===
- Robeson County, North Carolina – north
- Columbus County, North Carolina – north
- Horry County – east
- Marion County – south
- Florence County – southwest
- Marlboro County – west

=== Major highways ===
- Future I-73
- I-95
- US 301
- US 501
- SC 9
- SC 9 Conn.
- SC 34
- SC 38
- SC 41
- SC 41 Alt.
- SC 57
- SC 917

=== Major infrastructure ===
- Dillon County Airport
- Dillon Station
- Inland Port Dillon, major rail depot in the county

== Demographics ==
Historical population
Census	Pop.	Note	%±
1910	22,615		—
1920	25,278		11.8%
1930	25,733		1.8%
1940	29,625		15.1%
1950	30,930		4.4%
1960	30,584		−1.1%
1970	28,838		−5.7%
1980	31,083		7.8%
1990	29,114		−6.3%
2000	30,722		5.5%
2010	32,062		4.4%
2020	28,292		−11.8%
2025 (est.)	27,458	▼	−2.9%
U.S. Decennial Census; 1790–1960 1900–1990; 1990–2000 2010 2020

=== Racial and ethnic composition ===
Dillon County, South Carolina – Racial and ethnic composition Note: the US Census treats Hispanic/Latino as an ethnic category. This table excludes Latinos from the racial categories and assigns them to a separate category. Hispanics/Latinos may be of any race.
Race / Ethnicity (NH = Non-Hispanic)	Pop 1980	Pop 1990	Pop 2000	Pop 2010	Pop 2020	% 1980	% 1990	% 2000	% 2010	% 2020
White alone (NH)	17,467	15,844	15,309	15,152	12,987	56.19%	54.42%	49.83%	47.26%	45.90%
Black or African American alone (NH)	12,806	12,705	13,879	14,730	12,709	41.20%	43.64%	45.18%	45.94%	44.92%
Native American or Alaska Native alone (NH)	412	423	664	751	603	1.33%	1.45%	2.16%	2.34%	2.13%
Asian alone (NH)	57	65	100	76	63	0.18%	0.22%	0.33%	0.24%	0.22%
Native Hawaiian or Pacific Islander alone (NH)	x	x	8	8	1	x	x	0.03%	0.02%	0.00%
Other race alone (NH)	0	1	21	34	75	0.00%	0.00%	0.07%	0.11%	0.27%
Mixed race or Multiracial (NH)	x	x	202	478	998	x	x	0.66%	1.49%	3.53%
Hispanic or Latino (any race)	341	76	539	833	856	1.10%	0.26%	1.75%	2.60%	3.03%
Total	31,083	29,114	30,722	32,062	28,292	100.00%	100.00%	100.00%	100.00%	100.00%

=== 2020 census ===
As of the 2020 census, the county had a population of 28,292, 11,195 households, and 7,016 families residing within its borders.

The racial makeup of the county was 46.5% White, 45.0% Black or African American, 2.3% American Indian and Alaska Native, 0.2% Asian, 0.0% Native Hawaiian and Pacific Islander, 1.9% from some other race, and 4.1% from two or more races, while Hispanic or Latino residents of any race comprised 3.0% of the population.

The median age was 41.0 years, with 24.0% of residents under the age of 18 and 18.5% of residents 65 years of age or older. For every 100 females there were 87.8 males, and for every 100 females age 18 and over there were 83.6 males age 18 and over.

Of the 11,195 households, 31.4% had children under the age of 18 living with them and 38.7% had a female householder with no spouse or partner present. About 30.4% of all households were made up of individuals and 14.5% had someone living alone who was 65 years of age or older.

There were 12,779 housing units, of which 12.4% were vacant. Among occupied housing units, 66.9% were owner-occupied and 33.1% were renter-occupied. The homeowner vacancy rate was 1.7% and the rental vacancy rate was 7.8%.

30.0% of residents lived in urban areas, while 70.0% lived in rural areas.

=== 2010 census ===
At the 2010 census, there were 32,062 people, 11,923 households, and 8,342 families living in the county. The population density was 79.2 inhabitants per square mile (30.6/km^{2}). There were 13,742 housing units at an average density of 33.9 per square mile (13.1/km^{2}). The racial makeup of the county was 48.0% white, 46.1% black or African American, 2.5% American Indian, 0.2% Asian, 1.5% from other races, and 1.6% from two or more races. Those of Hispanic or Latino origin made up 2.6% of the population. In terms of ancestry, 13.5% were American, 6.5% were English, and 5.4% were Irish.

Of the 11,923 households, 36.5% had children under the age of 18 living with them, 40.2% were married couples living together, 23.9% had a female householder with no husband present, 30.0% were non-families, and 26.5% of all households were made up of individuals. The average household size was 2.65 and the average family size was 3.20. The median age was 36.7 years.

The median income for a household in the county was $26,818 and the median income for a family was $34,693. Males had a median income of $31,973 versus $22,100 for females. The per capita income for the county was $14,684. About 26.2% of families and 30.5% of the population were below the poverty line, including 43.8% of those under age 18 and 23.7% of those age 65 or over.

=== 2000 census ===
At the 2000 census, there were 30,722 people, 11,199 households, and 8,063 families living in the county. The population density was 76 people per square mile (29 people/km^{2}). There were 12,679 housing units at an average density of 31 per square mile (12/km^{2}). The racial makeup of the county was 47% White, 49% Black or African American, 2.21% Native American, 0.34% Asian, 0.03% Pacific Islander, 0.99% from other races, and 0.70% from two or more races. 1.75% of the population were Hispanic or Latino of any race.

There were 11,199 households, out of which 34.60% had children under the age of 18 living with them, 44.80% were married couples living together, 22.30% had a female householder with no husband present, and 28.00% were non-families. 25.10% of all households were made up of individuals, and 9.90% had someone living alone who was 65 years of age or older. The average household size was 2.71 and the average family size was 3.24.

In the county, the population was spread out, with 29.10% under the age of 18, 9.50% from 18 to 24, 27.50% from 25 to 44, 22.40% from 45 to 64, and 11.50% who were 65 years of age or older. The median age was 34 years. For every 100 females there were 87.40 males. For every 100 females age 18 and over, there were 81.60 males.

The median income for a household in the county was $26,630, and the median income for a family was $32,690. Males had a median income of $26,908 versus $18,007 for females. The per capita income for the county was $13,272. About 19.40% of families and 24.20% of the population were below the poverty line, including 33.30% of those under age 18 and 26.60% of those age 65 or over.

== Government and politics ==
Dillon County was one of the few counties nationwide that voted for Hillary Clinton in 2016 and Donald Trump in 2020.

United States presidential election results for Dillon County, South Carolina
Year	Republican		Democratic		Third party(ies)	
Year	No.	%	No.	%	No.	%
1912	2	0.29%	680	98.12%	11	1.59%
1916	0	0.00%	972	100.00%	0	0.00%
1920	5	0.50%	1,003	99.50%	0	0.00%
1924	3	0.50%	598	99.50%	0	0.00%
1928	21	3.63%	558	96.37%	0	0.00%
1932	20	1.96%	998	98.04%	0	0.00%
1936	5	0.45%	1,104	99.55%	0	0.00%
1940	25	2.80%	868	97.20%	0	0.00%
1944	27	2.69%	864	86.06%	113	11.25%
1948	24	1.33%	808	44.89%	968	53.78%
1952	1,473	48.28%	1,578	51.72%	0	0.00%
1956	313	10.49%	1,879	62.97%	792	26.54%
1960	1,439	35.17%	2,652	64.83%	0	0.00%
1964	2,742	49.72%	2,773	50.28%	0	0.00%
1968	2,396	35.73%	2,178	32.48%	2,132	31.79%
1972	4,364	72.32%	1,604	26.58%	66	1.09%
1976	2,527	33.08%	5,089	66.62%	23	0.30%
1980	3,385	42.31%	4,518	56.48%	97	1.21%
1984	4,646	57.71%	3,360	41.74%	44	0.55%
1988	3,793	53.66%	3,251	45.99%	25	0.35%
1992	3,575	38.07%	4,953	52.75%	862	9.18%
1996	2,774	39.29%	3,992	56.54%	295	4.18%
2000	3,975	44.22%	4,930	54.84%	85	0.95%
2004	4,301	46.57%	4,832	52.32%	102	1.10%
2008	5,874	43.78%	7,408	55.21%	135	1.01%
2012	5,427	41.63%	7,523	57.71%	85	0.65%
2016	5,637	48.19%	5,834	49.87%	227	1.94%
2020	6,582	50.24%	6,436	49.13%	83	0.63%
2024	6,526	55.02%	5,241	44.19%	94	0.79%

== Economy ==
In 2022, the GDP of Dillon County as $887.9 million (about $32,055 per capita). In chained 2017 dollars, the real GDP was $742.1 million (about $27,808 per capita). Between 2022 through 2024, the unemployment rate of the county has fluctuated between 3.6 and 5.7%.

Food Lion, Harbor Freight Tools, McLeod Health, Perdue Farms, and Walmart comprise some of the largest employers in the county.

Employment and Wage Statistics by Industry in Dillon County, South Carolina
Industry	Employment Counts	Employment Percentage (%)	Average Annual Wage ($)
Accommodation and Food Services	1,065	15.4	18,460
Administrative and Support and Waste Management and Remediation Services	174	2.5	25,792
Agriculture, Forestry, Fishing and Hunting	105	1.5	40,144
Construction	112	1.6	34,424
Finance and Insurance	129	1.9	45,396
Health Care and Social Assistance	1,106	15.9	43,368
Information	30	0.4	67,340
Manufacturing	1,844	26.6	45,188
Other Services (except Public Administration)	87	1.3	45,136
Professional, Scientific, and Technical Services	125	1.8	51,896
Public Administration	561	8.1	39,624
Real Estate and Rental and Leasing	30	0.4	35,516
Retail Trade	1,399	20.2	30,316
Wholesale Trade	169	2.4	66,768
Total	6,936	100.0%	37,311

== Attractions ==
- Dillon County Museum
- Dillon Motor Speedway
- Little Pee Dee State Park
- South of the Border

== Communities ==
=== Cities ===
- Dillon (county seat and largest community)

=== Towns ===
- Lake View
- Latta

=== Census-designated places ===
- Floydale
- Hamer
- Little Rock
- Newtown

=== Other unincorporated communities ===
- Bass Crossroads
- Berrys Crossroads
- Bingham
- Bronson Crossroads
- Bunker Hill
- Carmichael Crossroads
- Carolina
- Carter Landing
- Centerville
- Cotton Valley
- Dalcho
- Dothan
- Dunbarton
- Five Forks
- Fork
- Forrest Hills
- Gaddys Crossroads
- Gaddys Mill
- Galavon
- Hayestown
- High Hill Crossroads
- Jacksonville
- Judson
- Kemper
- Kentyre
- Linkside
- Mallory
- Mallory Beach
- Manning Crossroads
- May Hilltop
- McCormick Crossroads
- Minturn
- Mount Calvary
- Newtown
- Oak Grove
- Oakland Crossroads
- Oliver Crossroads
- Pittman Corner
- Riverdale
- Selma
- Sinclair Crossroads
- South of the Border
- Squires
- Squires Curve
- Temperance Hill

== See also ==
- List of counties in South Carolina
- National Register of Historic Places listings in Dillon County, South Carolina
