= Gresham, South Carolina =

- Unincorporated community
- Location within South Carolina Location within the United States
- Coordinates: 33°55′49″N 79°24′40″W
- Country: United States
- State: South Carolina
- County: Marion
- Elevation: 52 ft (16 m)

Population (2025)
  - Total: 2,574
- Time zone: UTC-5 (Eastern (EST))
  - Summer (DST): UTC-4 (EDT)
- ZIP code: 29546
- Area codes: 843, 854
- GNIS feature ID: 1222903

Gresham is an unincorporated community in Marion County, South Carolina, United States. The community is located north of the junction of U.S. Route 378 and South Carolina Highway 41, 17 miles (27 km) south of Marion. Gresham has a post office with ZIP code 29546, which opened on May 26, 1880. As of 2025, Gresham has a total population of 2,574.
