= South Carolina Highway 57 =

State highway in South Carolina, United States

South Carolina Highway 57

Route information
- Maintained by SCDOT
- Length: 25.880 mi (41.650 km)

Major junctions
- South end: SC 41 / SC 41 Alt. in Fork
- US 301 / US 501 / SC 9 / SC 34 in Dillon; I-95 in Dillon; SC 9 in Little Rock
- North end: Fairley Road at the North Carolina state line near Little Rock

Location
- Country: United States
- State: South Carolina
- Counties: Dillon

Highway system
- South Carolina State Highway System; Interstate; US; State; Scenic
← SC 56	→ SC 58

South Carolina Highway 57 (SC 57) is a 25.9-mile-long (41.7 km) state highway in the northeastern part of the U.S. state of South Carolina. The highway travels in a southeast-northwest orientation from the unincorporated community of Fork northwest through Dillon to Little River and then curves northeasterly to the North Carolina state line, north of Little River, all completely within Dillon County.

== Route description ==
SC 57 begins at an intersection with SC 41 and SC 41 Alternate in Fork. The route heads northeast through the town of Floydale until it enters Dillon. In town, the highway intersects SC 9, and the two routes form a concurrency to the northwest. They run along East Main Street until they meet U.S. Route 301 (US 301), US 501, and SC 34. SC 9/SC 57 turn right onto US 301/US 501 (North 2nd Avenue) slightly to the northeast. At Julia Lane, they split off from the concurrency to the northwest. They have an interchange with Interstate 95 (I-95) just before leaving the city. At the northern part of Little Rock, SC 57 departs the concurrency curving to the northeast until it meets its northern terminus, the North Carolina state line north of Little Rock. Here, the roadway continues as Fairley Road northeast to Raemon.

SC 57 is not part of the National Highway System, a system of roadways important to the nation's economy, defense, and mobility.

== History ==
=== South Carolina Highway 95 ===
South Carolina Highway 95
- Location: Little Rock, South Carolina
- Existed: 1939–September 1951

South Carolina Highway 95 (SC 95) was a state highway that existed in the far northern part of Dillon County. It was established in 1939 from Little Rock to a point approximately 5 miles (8.0 km) north-northwest of Little Rock. The next year, it was extended north-northwest and north-northeast to the North Carolina state line, where it continued as Fairley Road. In September 1951, it was decommissioned; most of its path was redesignated as SC 57.

== Major intersections ==
The entire route is in Dillon County.

Location	mi	km	Destinations	Notes
Fork	0.000	0.000	SC 41 / SC 41 Alt. south – Mullins, Marion	Southern terminus of SC 57; northern terminus of SC 41 Alt.
Dillon	10.550	16.979	SC 9 east (East Main Street)	Southern end of SC 9 concurrency
Dillon	11.310	18.202	US 301 south / US 501 south (North Second Avenue) / SC 34 west (East Main Street) – Latta	Southern end of US 301/US 501 concurrency; eastern terminus of SC 34
Dillon	12.250	19.714	US 301 north / US 501 north (North Second Avenue) – South of the Border	Northern end of US 301/US 501 concurrency
Dillon	13.430	21.613	I-95 – Florence, Lumberton	I-95 exit 193
Little Rock	16.700	26.876	SC 9 west – Bennettsville	Northern end of SC 9 concurrency
	25.880	41.650	Fairley Road north	Continuation beyond North Carolina state line
1.000 mi = 1.609 km; 1.000 km = 0.621 mi: Concurrency terminus
