= Marion County, South Carolina =

County in South Carolina, United States

- County
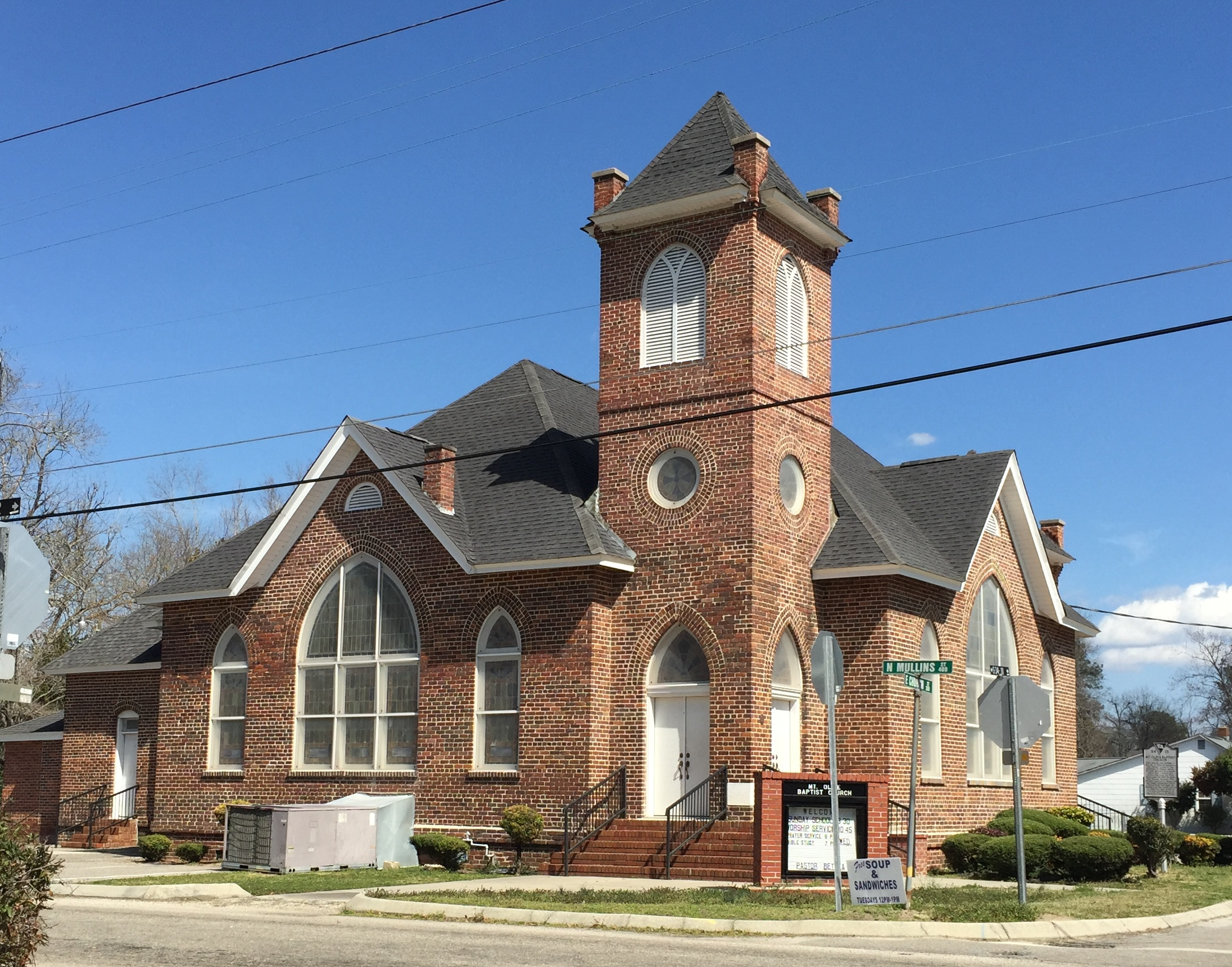
- Mt. Olive Baptist Church

- Seal Logo
- Motto: "It's just right!"
- Location within the U.S. state of South Carolina
- Interactive map of Marion County, South Carolina
- Coordinates: 34.08°N 79.35°W
- Country: United States
- State: South Carolina
- Founded: 1798
- Named for: Francis Marion
- Seat: Marion
- Largest community: Marion

Area
  - Total: 494.17 sq mi (1,279.9 km^{2})
  - Land: 489.37 sq mi (1,267.5 km^{2})
  - Water: 4.80 sq mi (12.4 km^{2}) 0.97%

Population (2020)
  - Total: 29,183
  - Estimate (2025): 28,242 ▼
  - Density: 59.634/sq mi (23.025/km^{2})
- Time zone: UTC−5 (Eastern)
  - Summer (DST): UTC−4 (EDT)
- Congressional district: 7th
- Website: www.marionsc.org

Marion County is a county located in the coastal plain of the U.S. state of South Carolina. As of the 2020 census, its population was 29,183. Its county seat is Marion. It is a majority-minority county.

== History ==
Early European traders in the Carolinas settled along the Pee Dee River from the 17th century, including in an isolated area called Sandy Bluff. They did business with numerous tribes, including the Choctaw and Chickasaw to the South. Crossed by several rivers, the county was organized by European Americans in 1785 soon after the American Revolutionary War and was originally known as Liberty County. However, four years later it was renamed as Marion County, in honor of Brigadier General Francis Marion, the famous "Swamp Fox" and a hero of the American Revolutionary War. In 1910, a portion of the county was taken to be organized as adjacent Dillon County.

== Geography ==
According to the U.S. Census Bureau, the county has a total area of 494.17 square miles (1,279.9 km^{2}), of which 489.37 square miles (1,267.5 km^{2}) is land and 4.80 square miles (12.4 km^{2}) (0.97%) is water.

=== National protected area ===
- Waccamaw National Wildlife Refuge (part)

=== State and local protected areas ===
- Little Pee Dee Heritage Preserve/Wildlife Management Area
- Marsh Wildlife Management Area
- Woodbury Wildlife Management Area

=== Major water bodies ===
- Cud Swamp
- Great Pee Dee River
- Lumber River
- Maidendown Swamp
- Waccamaw River

=== Adjacent counties ===
- Dillon County – north
- Horry County – east
- Georgetown County – south
- Williamsburg County – southwest
- Florence County – west

=== Major highways ===
- Future I-73
- US 76
- US 301
- US 378
- US 501
- US 501 Bus.
- SC 9
- SC 38
- SC 41
- SC 41 Alt.
- SC 57
- SC 576
- SC 908
- SC 917

== Demographics ==
Historical population
Census	Pop.	Note	%±
1800	6,914		—
1810	8,884		28.5%
1820	10,201		14.8%
1830	11,208		9.9%
1840	13,932		24.3%
1850	17,407		24.9%
1860	21,190		21.7%
1870	22,160		4.6%
1880	34,107		53.9%
1890	29,976		−12.1%
1900	35,181		17.4%
1910	20,596		−41.5%
1920	23,721		15.2%
1930	27,221		14.8%
1940	30,107		10.6%
1950	33,110		10.0%
1960	32,014		−3.3%
1970	30,270		−5.4%
1980	34,179		12.9%
1990	33,899		−0.8%
2000	35,466		4.6%
2010	33,062		−6.8%
2020	29,183		−11.7%
2025 (est.)	28,242	▼	−3.2%
U.S. Decennial Census; 1790–1960 1900–1990; 1990–2000 2010 2020

=== Racial and ethnic composition ===
Marion County, South Carolina – Racial and ethnic composition Note: the US Census treats Hispanic/Latino as an ethnic category. This table excludes Latinos from the racial categories and assigns them to a separate category. Hispanics/Latinos may be of any race.
Race / Ethnicity (NH = Non-Hispanic)	Pop 1980	Pop 1990	Pop 2000	Pop 2010	Pop 2020	% 1980	% 1990	% 2000	% 2010	% 2020
White alone (NH)	16,191	15,095	14,589	13,230	11,080	47.37%	44.53%	41.14%	40.02%	37.97%
Black or African American alone (NH)	17,552	18,479	19,860	18,365	16,333	51.35%	54.51%	56.00%	55.55%	55.97%
Native American or Alaska Native alone (NH)	53	85	86	133	109	0.16%	0.25%	0.24%	0.40%	0.37%
Asian alone (NH)	49	123	98	176	128	0.14%	0.36%	0.28%	0.53%	0.44%
Native Hawaiian or Pacific Islander alone (NH)	x	x	2	2	0	x	x	0.01%	0.01%	0.00%
Other race alone (NH)	5	7	27	16	42	0.01%	0.02%	0.08%	0.05%	0.14%
Mixed race or Multiracial (NH)	x	x	170	349	781	x	x	0.48%	1.06%	2.68%
Hispanic or Latino (any race)	329	110	634	791	710	0.96%	0.32%	1.79%	2.39%	2.43%
Total	34,179	33,899	35,466	33,062	29,183	100.00%	100.00%	100.00%	100.00%	100.00%

=== 2020 census ===
As of the 2020 census, there were 29,183 people, 12,272 households, and 7,532 families residing in the county.

As of the 2020 census, the median age was 44.4 years, with 21.7% of residents under the age of 18 and 21.5% aged 65 years or older. For every 100 females there were 85.6 males, and for every 100 females age 18 and over there were 81.6 males.

As of the 2020 census, the racial makeup of Marion County was 38.4% White, 56.2% Black or African American, 0.4% American Indian and Alaska Native, 0.5% Asian, 0.0% Native Hawaiian and Pacific Islander, 1.4% from some other race, and 3.1% from two or more races. Hispanic or Latino residents of any race comprised 2.4% of the population.

As of the 2020 census, 40.9% of residents lived in urban areas while 59.1% lived in rural areas.

Of the 12,272 households, 28.5% had children under the age of 18 living with them and 41.4% had a female householder with no spouse or partner present. About 31.5% of all households were made up of individuals and 14.9% had someone living alone who was 65 years of age or older.

As of the 2020 census, there were 14,253 housing units, of which 13.9% were vacant. Among occupied housing units, 68.9% were owner-occupied and 31.1% were renter-occupied. The homeowner vacancy rate was 1.7% and the rental vacancy rate was 9.1%.

=== 2010 census ===
At the 2010 census, there were 33,062 people, 13,058 households, and 8,881 families living in the county. The population density was 67.6 inhabitants per square mile (26.1/km^{2}). There were 14,953 housing units at an average density of 30.6 per square mile (11.8/km^{2}). The racial makeup of the county was 55.9% black or African American, 40.6% white, 0.5% Asian, 0.4% American Indian, 1.3% from other races, and 1.2% from two or more races. Those of Hispanic or Latino origin made up 2.4% of the population. In terms of ancestry, 7.8% were American, 6.3% were English, and 5.2% were Irish.

Of the 13,058 households, 33.4% had children under the age of 18 living with them, 38.0% were married couples living together, 24.9% had a female householder with no husband present, 32.0% were non-families, and 28.5% of all households were made up of individuals. The average household size was 2.52 and the average family size was 3.09. The median age was 39.9 years.

The median income for a household in the county was $30,629 and the median income for a family was $38,043. Males had a median income of $32,414 versus $24,929 for females. The per capita income for the county was $16,653. About 21.4% of families and 25.1% of the population were below the poverty line, including 36.8% of those under age 18 and 19.1% of those age 65 or over.

=== 2000 census ===
At the 2000 census, there were 35,466 people, 13,301 households, and 9,510 families living in the county. The population density was 72 people per square mile (28 people/km^{2}). There were 15,143 housing units at an average density of 31 per square mile (12/km^{2}). The racial makeup of the county was 56.35% Black or African American, 41.69% White, 0.25% Native American, 0.28% Asian, 0.01% Pacific Islander, 0.90% from other races, and 0.52% from two or more races. 1.79% of the population were Hispanic or Latino of any race.

There were 13,301 households, out of which 32.20% had children under the age of 18 living with them, 43.30% were married living together, 23.60% had a female householder with no husband present, and 28.50% were non-families. 25.40% of all households were made up of individuals, and 9.70% had someone living alone who was 65 years of age or older. The average household size was 2.64 and the average family size was 3.16.

In the county, the population was spread out, with 27.60% under the age of 18, 9.70% from 18 to 24, 26.80% from 25 to 44, 23.80% from 45 to 64, and 12.10% who were 65 years of age or older. The median age was 35 years. For every 100 females there were 85.90 males. For every 100 females age 18 and over, there were 80.40 males.

The median income for a household in the county was $26,526, and the median income for a family was $32,932. Males had a median income of $26,133 versus $18,392 for females. The per capita income for the county was $13,878. About 18.90% of families and 23.20% of the population were below the poverty line, including 33.30% of those under age 18 and 23.50% of those age 65 or over.

=== Religion ===
According to the 2010 U.S. Religious Census, residents of Marion County are predominately Protestant. But the county had the highest concentration of followers of the Baháʼí Faith of any county in the United States, at 5.5%.

== Government and politics ==
United States presidential election results for Marion County, South Carolina
Year	Republican		Democratic		Third party(ies)	
Year	No.	%	No.	%	No.	%
1900	119	8.41%	1,296	91.59%	0	0.00%
1904	49	3.15%	1,507	96.85%	0	0.00%
1912	3	0.41%	710	98.07%	11	1.52%
1916	3	0.29%	1,019	99.12%	6	0.58%
1920	1	0.12%	808	99.88%	0	0.00%
1924	2	0.32%	616	99.68%	0	0.00%
1928	51	6.96%	682	93.04%	0	0.00%
1932	12	1.25%	948	98.75%	0	0.00%
1936	5	0.41%	1,219	99.59%	0	0.00%
1940	18	2.45%	716	97.55%	0	0.00%
1944	9	0.97%	858	92.86%	57	6.17%
1948	14	0.91%	301	19.62%	1,219	79.47%
1952	2,313	58.96%	1,610	41.04%	0	0.00%
1956	417	13.20%	1,390	43.99%	1,353	42.82%
1960	1,646	40.71%	2,397	59.29%	0	0.00%
1964	3,197	60.98%	2,046	39.02%	0	0.00%
1968	2,512	36.85%	2,821	41.38%	1,484	21.77%
1972	4,719	64.66%	2,545	34.87%	34	0.47%
1976	3,076	34.12%	5,927	65.74%	13	0.14%
1980	3,321	37.73%	5,379	61.12%	101	1.15%
1984	4,698	48.07%	5,043	51.60%	32	0.33%
1988	4,403	46.42%	5,008	52.79%	75	0.79%
1992	3,647	35.15%	5,843	56.31%	886	8.54%
1996	3,595	34.40%	6,359	60.85%	497	4.76%
2000	4,687	38.58%	7,358	60.56%	104	0.86%
2004	5,589	41.38%	7,767	57.50%	151	1.12%
2008	5,416	35.69%	9,608	63.32%	150	0.99%
2012	5,164	34.46%	9,688	64.65%	134	0.89%
2016	5,444	38.13%	8,569	60.02%	263	1.84%
2020	5,711	38.84%	8,872	60.34%	121	0.82%
2024	5,906	44.11%	7,316	54.65%	166	1.24%

Marion County is strongly Democratic in presidential elections, having not voted for a Republican presidential candidate since Richard Nixon in 1972. In 2024, Marion County saw one of the strongest Republican shifts in the state, marking the closest election since 1988, despite Democrat Kamala Harris still carrying the county.

== Economy ==
In 2022, the GDP was $728.2 million (about $25,545 per capita), and the real GDP was $610.4 million (about $21,413 per capita) in chained 2017 dollars.

As of April 2024, some of the largest employers in the county include Coca-Cola Consolidated, the city of Mullins, Domtar, Goodyear Tire and Rubber Company, and Walmart.

Employment and Wage Statistics by Industry in Marion County, South Carolina - Q3 2023
Industry	Employment Counts	Employment Percentage (%)	Average Annual Wage ($)
Accommodation and Food Services	630	10.2	21,944
Administrative and Support and Waste Management and Remediation Services	298	4.8	28,600
Agriculture, Forestry, Fishing and Hunting	73	1.2	40,560
Arts, Entertainment, and Recreation	19	0.3	7,436
Construction	220	3.6	54,652
Finance and Insurance	317	5.2	58,968
Health Care and Social Assistance	1,681	27.3	51,064
Information	41	0.7	41,548
Management of Companies and Enterprises	26	0.4	57,200
Manufacturing	364	5.9	57,616
Other Services (except Public Administration)	56	0.9	28,028
Professional, Scientific, and Technical Services	69	1.1	57,720
Public Administration	551	9.0	39,208
Real Estate and Rental and Leasing	57	0.9	48,776
Retail Trade	906	14.7	26,520
Transportation and Warehousing	674	11.0	47,788
Utilities	48	0.8	57,356
Wholesale Trade	120	2.0	52,156
Total	6,150	100.0%	42,496

== Communities ==
=== Cities ===
- Marion (county seat and largest community)
- Mullins

=== Towns ===
- Nichols
- Sellers

=== Census-designated places ===
- Centenary
- Daviston
- Rains
- Zion

=== Other unincorporated communities ===
- Ariel Crossroad
- Brittons Neck
- Friendship
- Gresham
- Temperance Hill

== See also ==
- List of counties in South Carolina
- National Register of Historic Places listings in Marion County, South Carolina
- Chaloklowa Chickasaw, state-recognized group that resides in the county
