= Fork, South Carolina =

- Unincorporated community
- Location within South Carolina Location within the United States
- Coordinates: 34°17′18″N 79°16′31″W
- Country: United States
- State: South Carolina
- County: Dillon
- Elevation: 98 ft (30 m)
- Time zone: UTC-5 (Eastern (EST))
  - Summer (DST): UTC-4 (EDT)
- ZIP code: 29543
- Area codes: 843, 854
- GNIS feature ID: 1247795

Fork is an unincorporated community in Dillon County, South Carolina, United States. Fork is located at the junction of South Carolina Highway 41 and South Carolina Highway 57, 10.4 miles (16.7 km) south-southeast of Dillon. Fork has a post office with ZIP code 29543.
