= Centenary, South Carolina =

Centenary
- unincorporated community
- Location within the state of South Carolina
- Coordinates: 34°01′33″N 79°21′09″W
- Country: United States
- State: South Carolina
- County: Marion County

Area
  - Total: 0.95 sq mi (2.45 km^{2})
  - Land: 0.95 sq mi (2.45 km^{2})
  - Water: 0 sq mi (0.00 km^{2})
- Elevation: 56 ft (17 m)

Population (2020)
  - Total: 191
  - Density: 202.2/sq mi (78.06/km^{2})
- Time zone: UTC-5 (Eastern (EST))
  - Summer (DST): UTC-4 (EDT)
- ZIP code: 29519
- Area codes: 843, 854
- GNIS feature ID: 2812977

Centenary is an unincorporated community in Marion County, South Carolina, United States. Located along SC 41 Alt, 10.5 miles (16.9 km) south of Marion. Along the CSX Seaboard Air Line, the area is a predominantly farming community.

The community took its name from the local Centenary Methodist Church, which itself was named in commemoration of a centenary milestone in Methodism.

It was first listed as a CDP prior to the 2020 census with a population of 191.

== Demographics ==
Historical population
Census	Pop.	Note	%±
2020	191		—
U.S. Decennial Census; 2020

Centenary first appeared as a census designated place in the 2020 U.S. census.

Centenary CDP, South Carolina – Racial and ethnic composition Note: the US Census treats Hispanic/Latino as an ethnic category. This table excludes Latinos from the racial categories and assigns them to a separate category. Hispanics/Latinos may be of any race.
Race / Ethnicity (NH = Non-Hispanic)	Pop 2020	% 2020
White alone (NH)	47	24.61%
Black or African American alone (NH)	140	73.30%
Native American or Alaska Native alone (NH)	1	0.52%
Asian alone (NH)	0	0.00%
Native Hawaiian or Pacific Islander alone (NH)	0	0.00%
Other race alone (NH)	0	0.00%
Mixed race or Multiracial (NH)	1	0.52%
Hispanic or Latino (any race)	2	1.05%
Total	191	100.00%
