= Nichols, South Carolina =

- Town
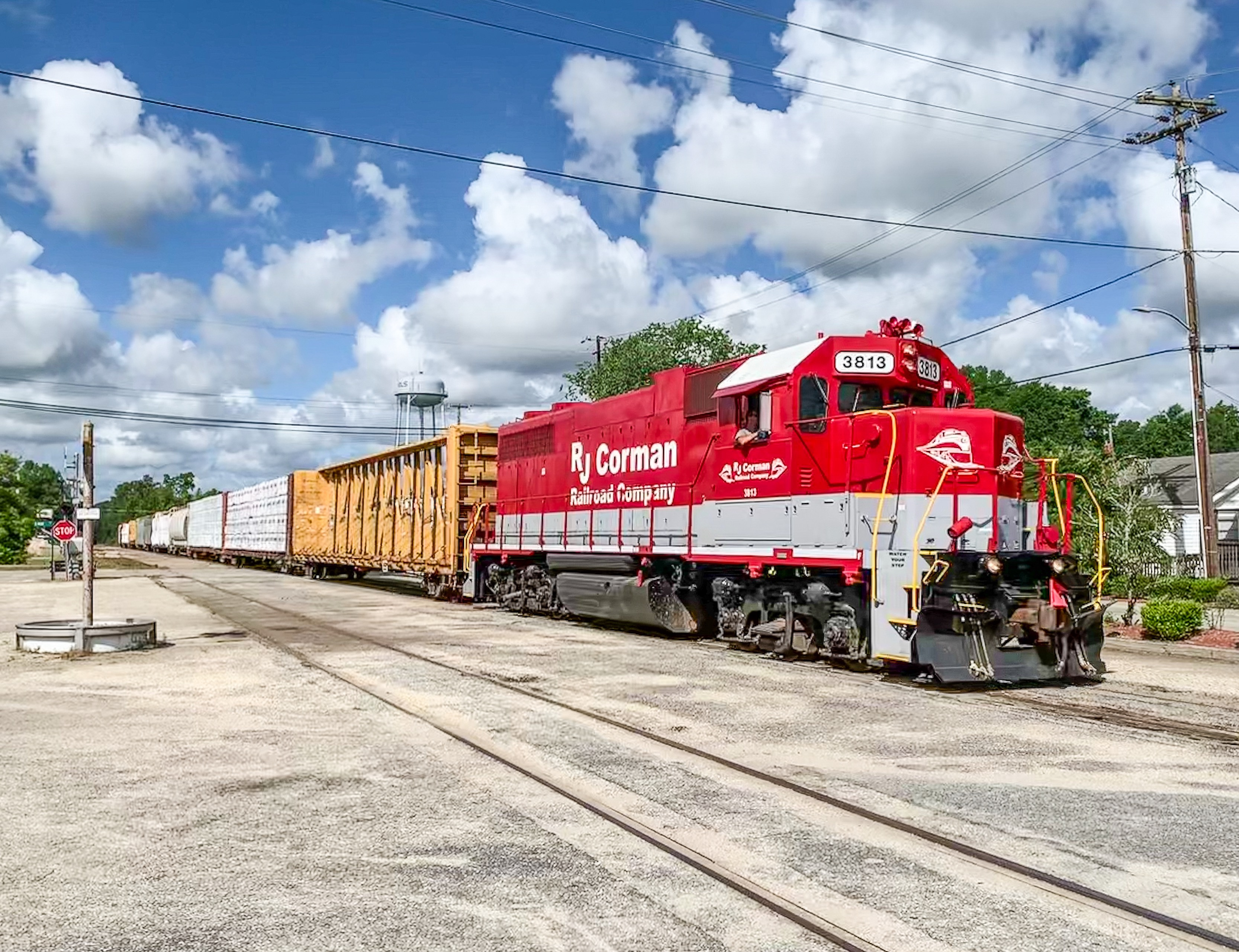
- Train passing through Nichols, 2019

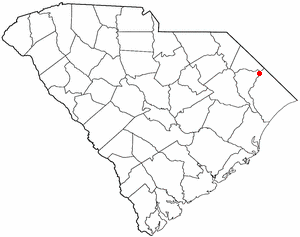
- Location of Nichols in South Carolina
- Coordinates: 34°14′07″N 79°08′57″W
- Country: United States
- State: South Carolina
- County: Marion

Area
  - Total: 1.34 sq mi (3.46 km^{2})
  - Land: 1.34 sq mi (3.46 km^{2})
  - Water: 0 sq mi (0.00 km^{2})
- Elevation: 52 ft (16 m)

Population (2020)
  - Total: 234
  - Density: 175/sq mi (67.6/km^{2})
- Time zone: UTC-5 (EST)
  - Summer (DST): UTC-4 (EDT)
- ZIP code: 29581
- Area codes: 843 and 854
- FIPS code: 45-50110
- GNIS feature ID: 2406992

Nichols is a town in Marion County, South Carolina, United States. As of the 2020 census, Nichols had a population of 234.

== Geography ==
According to the United States Census Bureau, the town has a total area of 1.4 square miles (3.6 km^{2}), all land.

== History ==
The town was founded around the same time as Marion and Mullins, which was sometime after 1854 and was initially known as Floydsville. This was due to the land being on Harman Floyd's land that was sold off as town lots after his death. These lots were surrounding depots for the Wilmington and Manchester Railroad. The town experienced a minor boom due to the turpentine industry, which shortly died out and was replaced by the tobacco industry. Later on, the town was renamed to its current title of Nichols, this time to honor Averett B. Nichols, who was a businessman that built a warehouse and store to take advantage of the tobacco boom and owned other stores in the town beside those of John H. Stroud and C. R. Ford. Following World War II, a popular employer was a local store focusing in furniture that went by the name Pilliod of Carolina.

The town suffered severe flooding from Hurricane Matthew from the nearby Lumber River in 2016. Five months after the hurricane, 216 of the town's 261 homes remained vacant. Two of six churches remained closed, as were 15 of 22 businesses, the library, and most of the fire and police department resources. Mayor Lawson Battle suggested that the State House request that the Senate requisition $700,000 to help repair nearly 400 water-damaged buildings, replace vehicles, and reopen government offices. State Senator Kent Williams proposed this money be taken from the $4.5 million left over from a 2015 farmer aid package for storm damage.

== Demographics ==
Historical population
Census	Pop.	Note	%±
1880	122		—
1890	57		−53.3%
1900	82		43.9%
1910	118		43.9%
1920	191		61.9%
1930	239		25.1%
1940	292		22.2%
1950	380		30.1%
1960	617		62.4%
1970	549		−11.0%
1980	606		10.4%
1990	528		−12.9%
2000	408		−22.7%
2010	368		−9.8%
2020	234		−36.4%
U.S. Decennial Census

As of the census of 2000, there were 408 people, 176 households, and 120 families residing in the town. The population density was 293.8 inhabitants per square mile (113.4/km^{2}). There were 199 housing units at an average density of 143.3 per square mile (55.3/km^{2}). The racial makeup of the town was 51.96% White, 47.06% African American, 0.25% Native American, and 0.74% from two or more races.

There were 176 households, out of which 17.6% had children under the age of 18 living with them, 44.3% were married couples living together, 19.3% had a female householder with no husband present, and 31.8% were non-families. 29.5% of all households were made up of individuals, and 13.6% had someone living alone who was 65 years of age or older. The average household size was 2.32 and the average family size was 2.85.

In the town, the population was spread out, with 18.6% under the age of 18, 12.5% from 18 to 24, 22.3% from 25 to 44, 27.5% from 45 to 64, and 19.1% who were 65 years of age or older. The median age was 43 years. For every 100 females, there were 83.0 males. For every 100 females age 18 and over, there were 76.6 males.

The median income for a household in the town was $41,597, and the median income for a family was $43,393. Males had a median income of $30,000 versus $19,306 for females. The per capita income for the town was $18,092. About 6.6% of families and 11.4% of the population were below the poverty line, including 8.9% of those under age 18 and 4.1% of those age 65 or over.

== Education ==
Nichols has a public library, which is a branch of the Marion County Library System.
