= Lake View, South Carolina =

- Town
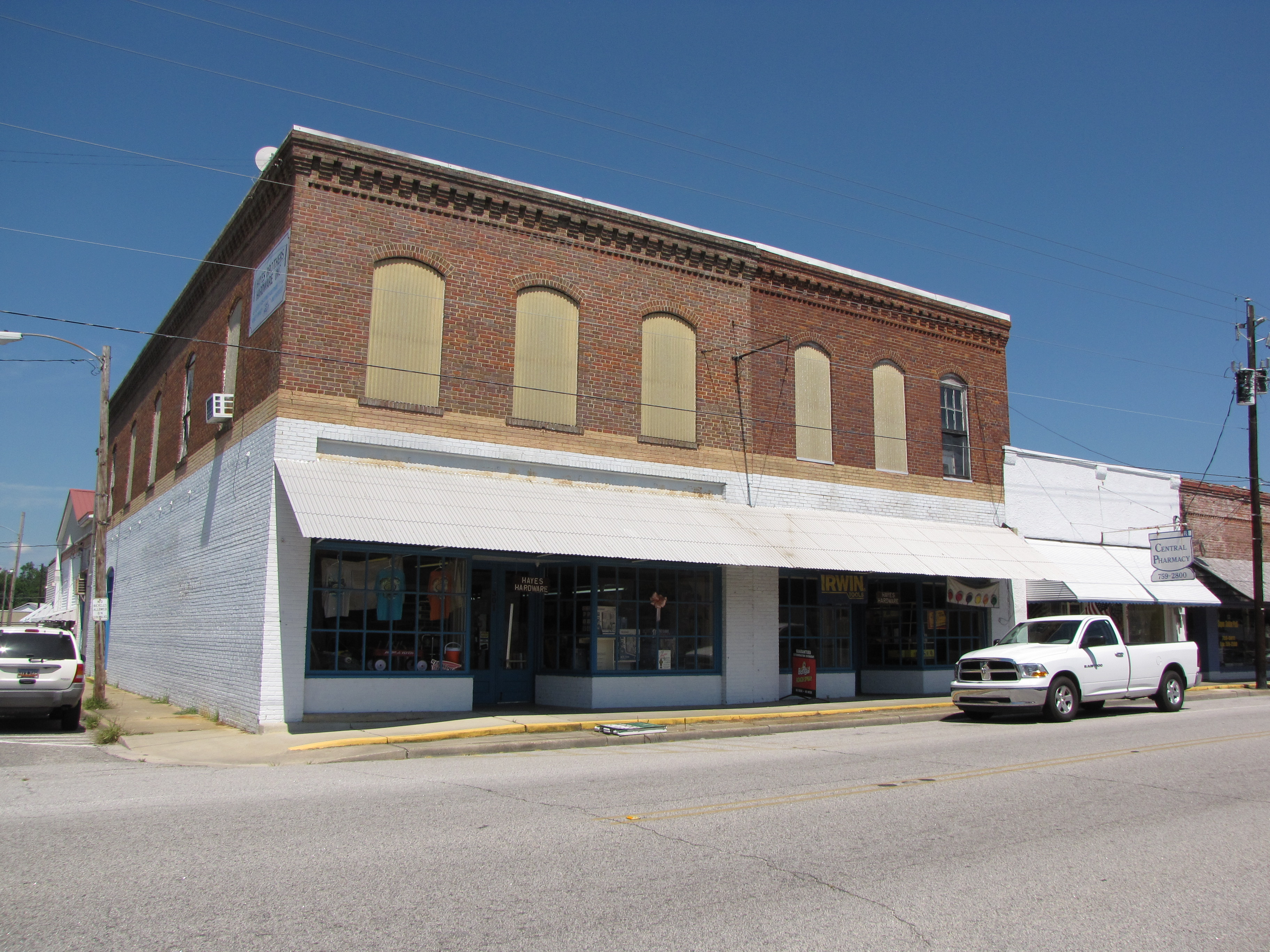
- Main Street (a.k.a. "Shopping Center 9") and First Avenue

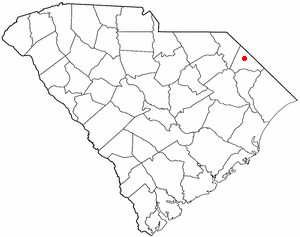
- Location of Lake View in South Carolina
- Coordinates: 34°20′26″N 79°09′59″W
- Country: United States
- State: South Carolina
- County: Dillon

Area
  - Total: 1.71 sq mi (4.42 km^{2})
  - Land: 1.71 sq mi (4.42 km^{2})
  - Water: 0 sq mi (0.00 km^{2})
- Elevation: 82 ft (25 m)

Population (2020)
  - Total: 764
  - Density: 448/sq mi (172.9/km^{2})
- Time zone: UTC-5 (EST)
  - Summer (DST): UTC-4 (EDT)
- ZIP code: 29563
- Area codes: 843, 854
- FIPS code: 45-39715
- GNIS feature ID: 2405978
- Website: https://townoflakeviewsc.org/

Lake View is a town in Dillon County, South Carolina, United States. As of the 2020 census, Lake View had a population of 764.

== History ==
The town of Lake View originated as Ford's Mill, and the name was changed to "Page's Mill" in 1870. The town was officially incorporated as Page's Mill in 1907, and the citizens voted to change its name to "Lake View" in 1916.

== Geography ==
Lake View is located in southeastern Dillon County 2 miles (3 km) southwest of the North Carolina border. It is 13 miles (21 km) southeast of Dillon.

According to the United States Census Bureau, the town has a total area of 1.7 square miles (4.4 km^{2}), all land. The town sits along South Carolina Highway 9, a primary route to Myrtle Beach. During hurricane evacuations and peak tourist season, the two-lane highway often becomes heavily congested.

== Demographics ==
Historical population
Census	Pop.	Note	%±
1910	157		—
1920	330		110.2%
1930	447		35.5%
1940	532		19.0%
1950	653		22.7%
1960	865		32.5%
1970	949		9.7%
1980	939		−1.1%
1990	872		−7.1%
2000	789		−9.5%
2010	807		2.3%
2020	764		−5.3%
U.S. Decennial Census

As of the census of 2000, there were 789 people, 332 households, and 201 families residing in the town. The population density was 468.8 inhabitants per square mile (181.0/km^{2}). There were 374 housing units at an average density of 222.2 per square mile (85.8/km^{2}). The racial makeup of the town was 63.62% White, 34.73% African American, 1.14% Native American, 0.13% from other races, and 0.38% from two or more races. Hispanic or Latino of any race were 0.63% of the population.

There were 332 households, out of which 19.9% had children under the age of 18 living with them, 41.6% were married couples living together, 16.9% had a female householder with no husband present, and 39.2% were non-families. 37.3% of all households were made up of individuals, and 19.0% had someone living alone who was 65 years of age or older. The average household size was 2.20 and the average family size was 2.91.

In the town, the population was spread out, with 19.5% under the age of 18, 5.8% from 18 to 24, 20.0% from 25 to 44, 29.5% from 45 to 64, and 25.1% who were 65 years of age or older. The median age was 48 years. For every 100 females, there were 67.5 males. For every 100 females age 18 and over, there were 62.8 males.

The median income for a household in the town was $23,438, and the median income for a family was $32,917. Males had a median income of $29,286 versus $20,625 for females. The per capita income for the town was $17,790. About 14.8% of families and 20.2% of the population were below the poverty line, including 29.6% of those under age 18 and 22.7% of those age 65 or over.

== Education ==
Lake View schools are zoned to Dillon School District Four.

Lake View has a public library, a branch of the Dillon County Library.

== Notable Person ==
- Shaquille Leonard, high school and college football player.
