= Dillon, South Carolina =

- City
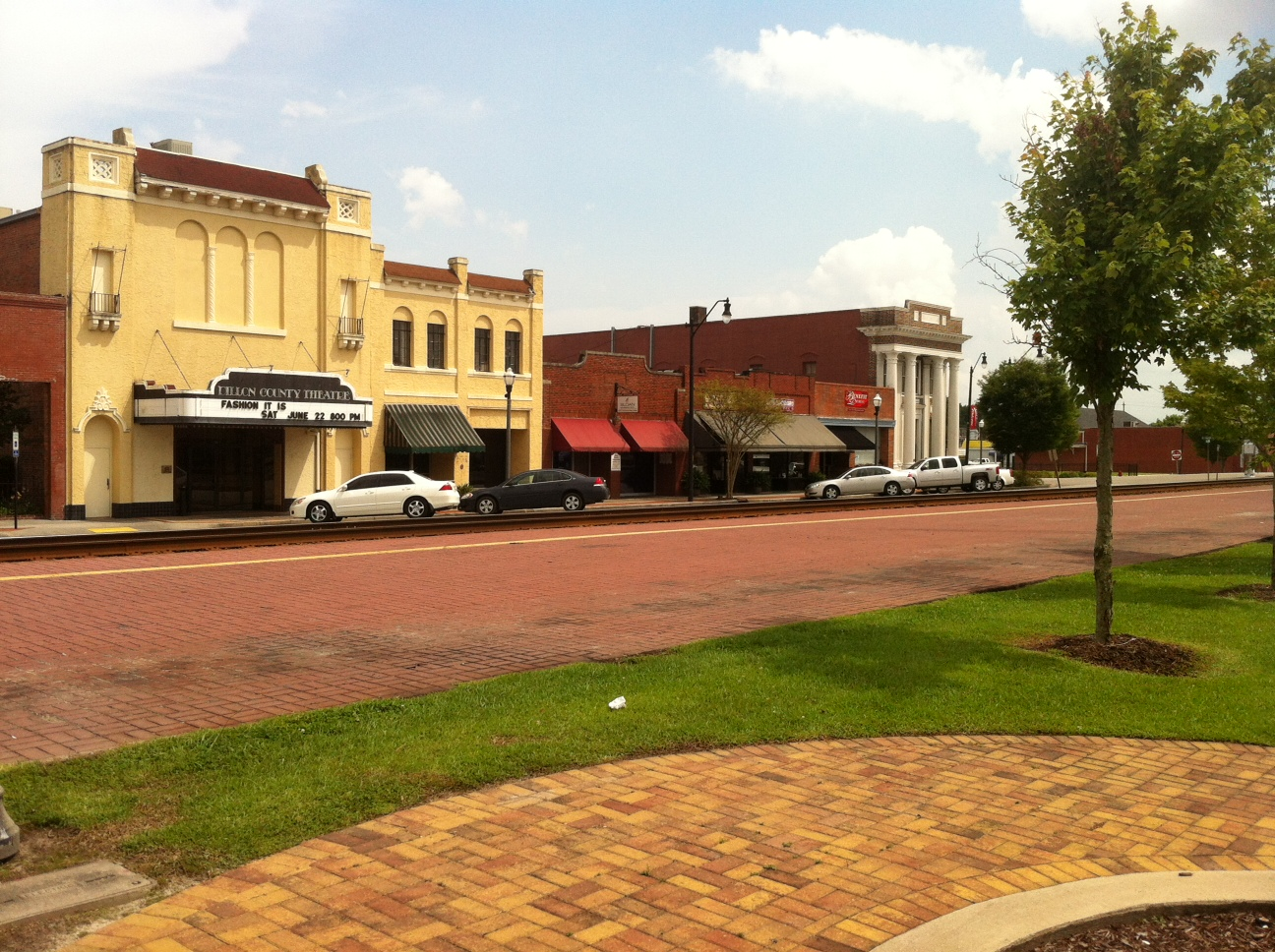
- Downtown Dillon from the Amtrak station in June 2013.

- Seal
- Motto: "Your First Stop in SC"
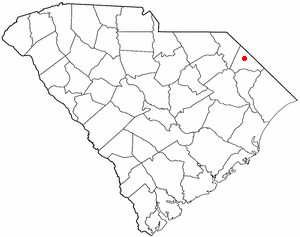
- Location of Dillon in South Carolina
- Coordinates: 34°25′24″N 79°22′35″W
- Country: United States
- State: South Carolina
- County: Dillon
- Established: December 22, 1888
- Named for: James W. Dillon

Government
  - Type: Council-Manager Form of Government

Area
  - Total: 5.37 sq mi (13.91 km^{2})
  - Land: 5.34 sq mi (13.83 km^{2})
  - Water: 0.031 sq mi (0.08 km^{2})
- Elevation: 118 ft (36 m)

Population (2020)
  - Total: 6,384
  - Density: 1,195.9/sq mi (461.73/km^{2})
- Time zone: UTC-5 (Eastern (EST))
  - Summer (DST): UTC-4 (EDT)
- ZIP code: 29536
- Area codes: 843, 854
- FIPS code: 45-19420
- GNIS feature ID: 2404230
- Website: www.cityofdillonsc.gov

Dillon is the county seat of and the largest city in Dillon County in eastern South Carolina, United States. It was established on December 22, 1888. Both the name of the city and county comes from James W. Dillon, an early settler and key figure in bringing a railroad through the area. As of the 2020 census, Dillon had a population of 6,384.

== History ==
Dillon County was founded in 1910 from a portion of Marion County. The county and the city of Dillon are named for prosperous local citizen James W. Dillon (1826−1913), an Irishman who settled there and led a campaign to bring the railroad into the community. The result of this effort was the construction of the Wilson Short Cut Railroad, which later became part of the Atlantic Coast Line Railroad, and which brought greater prosperity to the area by directly linking Dillon County to the national network of railroads. For many decades, residents of Dillon County were primarily loggers and farmers growing cotton and tobacco. Timber harvesting remains a major industry in the county. Dillon County has seen growth in manufacturing and distribution centers over the past 20 years due in part to Interstate 95, which runs north-south through the county.

Dillon was once known as the "Wedding Capital of the East" because South Carolina allowed people as young as 14 to get married without other requirements. Many couples who got married in Dillon went to South of the Border for their honeymoons.

== Geography ==
Dillon is located near the center of Dillon County in the Pee Dee region of northeastern South Carolina. The Little Pee Dee River, a tributary of the Pee Dee River, runs just east of the city.

U.S. Routes 301 and 501 pass through the city as Second Avenue, leading northeast 7 miles (11 km) to Interstate 95 at South of the Border along the North Carolina line, and southwest 6.5 miles (10.5 km) to Latta. Interstate 95 passes northeast of the city, with access from Exits 190 and 193. I-95 leads northeast 25 miles (40 km) to Lumberton, North Carolina, and southwest 28 miles (45 km) to Florence. South Carolina Highway 9 passes through the center of town, leading northwest 26 miles (42 km) to Bennettsville and southeast 13 miles (21 km) to Lake View. South Carolina Highway 57 follows SC 9 through Dillon but leads north 14 miles (23 km) to the North Carolina border and south 17 miles (27 km) to Mullins. SC 9 and 57 follow Main Street southeast out of town. South Carolina Highway 34 follows Main Street northwest out of town, leading west 33 miles (53 km) to Darlington.

According to the U.S. Census Bureau, Dillon has a total area of 5.3 square miles (13.6 km^{2}), of which 0.01 square miles (0.03 km^{2}), or 0.21%, is water. The Little Pee Dee River flows southwards 2 miles (3 km) east of the center of town.

=== Climate ===
Climate data for Dillon, South Carolina (1991–2020 normals, extremes 1904–1917, 1936–2019)
Month	Jan	Feb	Mar	Apr	May	Jun	Jul	Aug	Sep	Oct	Nov	Dec	Year
Record high °F (°C)	81 (27)	85 (29)	97 (36)	94 (34)	102 (39)	107 (42)	105 (41)	106 (41)	102 (39)	100 (38)	89 (32)	82 (28)	107 (42)
Mean maximum °F (°C)	74.3 (23.5)	77.2 (25.1)	82.5 (28.1)	86.9 (30.5)	92.2 (33.4)	96.6 (35.9)	97.9 (36.6)	97.0 (36.1)	92.7 (33.7)	87.3 (30.7)	80.1 (26.7)	75.0 (23.9)	99.3 (37.4)
Mean daily maximum °F (°C)	56.3 (13.5)	60.0 (15.6)	67.5 (19.7)	76.1 (24.5)	83.1 (28.4)	89.0 (31.7)	92.2 (33.4)	90.4 (32.4)	85.1 (29.5)	76.3 (24.6)	66.9 (19.4)	59.0 (15.0)	75.2 (24.0)
Daily mean °F (°C)	44.1 (6.7)	47.0 (8.3)	53.6 (12.0)	62.0 (16.7)	70.1 (21.2)	77.5 (25.3)	81.1 (27.3)	79.5 (26.4)	73.9 (23.3)	63.6 (17.6)	53.4 (11.9)	46.8 (8.2)	62.7 (17.1)
Mean daily minimum °F (°C)	31.9 (−0.1)	33.9 (1.1)	39.7 (4.3)	47.8 (8.8)	57.2 (14.0)	66.1 (18.9)	69.9 (21.1)	68.7 (20.4)	62.7 (17.1)	50.9 (10.5)	39.9 (4.4)	34.6 (1.4)	50.3 (10.2)
Mean minimum °F (°C)	18.0 (−7.8)	20.8 (−6.2)	26.5 (−3.1)	34.7 (1.5)	45.8 (7.7)	57.1 (13.9)	63.8 (17.7)	61.3 (16.3)	52.3 (11.3)	36.3 (2.4)	26.2 (−3.2)	22.0 (−5.6)	16.0 (−8.9)
Record low °F (°C)	−1 (−18)	5 (−15)	11 (−12)	24 (−4)	30 (−1)	42 (6)	49 (9)	48 (9)	36 (2)	18 (−8)	12 (−11)	2 (−17)	−1 (−18)
Average precipitation inches (mm)	3.96 (101)	3.26 (83)	3.89 (99)	3.72 (94)	3.62 (92)	4.28 (109)	5.50 (140)	5.41 (137)	4.79 (122)	3.96 (101)	3.11 (79)	3.13 (80)	48.63 (1,235)
Average snowfall inches (cm)	0.7 (1.8)	trace	0.0 (0.0)	0.0 (0.0)	0.0 (0.0)	0.0 (0.0)	0.0 (0.0)	0.0 (0.0)	0.0 (0.0)	0.0 (0.0)	0.0 (0.0)	0.1 (0.25)	0.8 (2.0)
Average precipitation days (≥ 0.01 in)	8.3	7.4	7.4	6.5	7.8	8.8	9.2	9.0	6.6	5.6	5.7	7.7	90.0
Average snowy days (≥ 0.1 in)	0.4	0.2	0.0	0.0	0.0	0.0	0.0	0.0	0.0	0.0	0.0	0.2	0.8
Source: NOAA

== Economy ==
In the spring of 2018, Dillon Inland Port was constructed, furthering economic growth based on the Port of Charleston.

== Demographics ==
Historical population
Census	Pop.	Note	%±
1890	82		—
1900	1,015		1,137.8%
1910	1,757		73.1%
1920	2,205		25.5%
1930	2,731		23.9%
1940	3,867		41.6%
1950	5,171		33.7%
1960	6,173		19.4%
1970	6,391		3.5%
1980	7,060		10.5%
1990	6,829		−3.3%
2000	6,316		−7.5%
2010	6,788		7.5%
2020	6,384		−6.0%
U.S. Decennial Census

=== Racial and ethnic composition ===
Dillon city, South Carolina – Racial and ethnic composition Note: the US Census treats Hispanic/Latino as an ethnic category. This table excludes Latinos from the racial categories and assigns them to a separate category. Hispanics/Latinos may be of any race.
Race / Ethnicity (NH = Non-Hispanic)	Pop 2000	Pop 2010	Pop 2020	% 2000	% 2010	% 2020
White alone (NH)	3,375	2,880	2,475	53.44%	42.43%	38.77%
Black or African American alone (NH)	2,724	3,586	3,418	43.13%	52.83%	53.54%
Native American or Alaska Native alone (NH)	84	100	62	1.33%	1.47%	0.97%
Asian alone (NH)	47	44	40	0.74%	0.65%	0.63%
Native Hawaiian or Pacific Islander alone (NH)	0	1	0	0.00%	0.01%	0.00%
Other race alone (NH)	3	18	18	0.05%	0.27%	0.28%
Mixed race or Multiracial (NH)	35	75	198	0.55%	1.10%	3.10%
Hispanic or Latino (any race)	48	84	173	0.76%	1.24%	2.71%
Total	6,316	6,788	6,384	100.00%	100.00%	100.00%

=== 2020 census ===
As of the 2020 census, there were 6,384 people, 2,578 households, and 1,364 families residing in the city, and the median age was 39.7 years.

24.7% of residents were under the age of 18 and 19.3% of residents were 65 years of age or older, while for every 100 females there were 82.4 males and for every 100 females age 18 and over there were 76.9 males age 18 and over.

98.5% of residents lived in urban areas, while 1.5% lived in rural areas.

There were 2,578 households in Dillon, of which 32.4% had children under the age of 18 living in them. Of all households, 31.3% were married-couple households, 17.5% were households with a male householder and no spouse or partner present, and 46.3% were households with a female householder and no spouse or partner present. About 32.7% of all households were made up of individuals and 16.4% had someone living alone who was 65 years of age or older.

There were 2,931 housing units, of which 12.0% were vacant. The homeowner vacancy rate was 3.4% and the rental vacancy rate was 6.5%.

Racial composition as of the 2020 census
Race	Number	Percent
White	2,530	39.6%
Black or African American	3,424	53.6%
American Indian and Alaska Native	63	1.0%
Asian	44	0.7%
Native Hawaiian and Other Pacific Islander	0	0.0%
Some other race	85	1.3%
Two or more races	238	3.7%

=== 2010 census ===
The population grew 7.5 percent from between the 2000 and 2010 censuses. The city is 53.1% Black or African American, 42.8% White or Caucasian persons, 1.6% American Indian or Alaska Native persons, 1.2% persons of Hispanic or Latino origin, and 1.2% persons reporting two or more races.

There were a recorded 2,454 households, averaging between two and three (2.57) people per household, as well as 2,916 housing units within the city. Of the 2,916 housing units, 13.7% were multi-unit structures. The average value of a housing unit was $101,800 for owner occupied units. The census also showed that the population density of Dillon was 1,299.1 persons per square mile. The land area of the city of Dillon was 5.23 square miles. The median household income was found to be $30,455 with a rate of 30.4% of people living in poverty.

== Government ==
Dillon's government is a city manager-council type.

== Wellness center ==
The city of Dillon offers a public wellness center, located at 1647 Commerce Drive. The $4.1 million facility was built in 2008. It is a 40,000-square-foot (3,700 m^{2}) building that offers exercise equipment, a sauna, gymnasium, walking track, and meeting rooms. It also offers rooms for rental. The exercise facilities can be used for a fee of $10, or memberships are available at monthly rates.

== Education ==
Public education in Dillon is administered by Dillon School District Four. The district operates East Elementary, South Elementary, Stewart Heights Elementary, Lake View Elementary, Gordon Elementary, Dillon Middle School, Dillon High School and Lake View High School.

Dillon Christian School is a private institution.

Northeastern Technical College offers secondary education.

Dillon has a public library, a branch of the Dillon County Library.

== Transportation ==
=== Highways ===
Downtown Dillon is the intersection of US 301, US 501, SC 9, SC 34 and SC 57. I-95 has two exits to Dillon, and it is planned that I-73 will serve Dillon as part of a future southward expansion. In August 2023, Dillon got a 40-stall Version 3 Tesla Supercharger station, the largest in the southeastern United States.

=== Rail ===
Amtrak, the national rail passenger carrier, provides daily service from Dillon with the Palmetto, which runs between Savannah, Georgia, and New York City on the South End Subdivision. Trains stop at the Dillon station, originally opened for passenger use by the Atlantic Coast Line Railroad in 1904. A second line known as the Andrews Subdivision, formerly owned by the Seaboard Air Line Railroad runs through Dillon, but only carries freight. CSX owns both railroad lines which cross Dillon.

== Media ==
The Dillon Herald is the city of Dillon's newspaper. The paper was established in 1894 and is the oldest "continuously operated" business in Dillon County.

The Dillon Observer is an online newspaper focusing on Dillon, South Carolina established in 2020.

== Notable people ==
- Ben Bernanke, chairman of the Federal Reserve from 2006 to 2014
- Alfred W. Bethea, member of the South Carolina House of Representatives from 1961 to 1966
- John Chavis, defensive coordinator, Birmingham Stallions
- Johnny Davis, two-time PKA kickboxing world champion
- Derrick Hamilton, football player
- Rufus R. Jones, professional wrestler
- Willie Jones, Major League Baseball player
- Kenneth Manning, professor of rhetoric and of the history of science at the Massachusetts Institute of Technology
- Kevin Steele, current University of Alabama defensive coordinator
- Lieutenant General Jack C. Stultz, former Commanding General, U.S. Army Reserve Command
- Robin Tallon, U.S. representative from South Carolina
