= Area codes 843 and 854 =

Telephone area codes for eastern South Carolina, United States

Coordinates: 33°20′N 80°2′W

Area codes 843 and 854 are telephone area codes in the North American Numbering Plan (NANP) for a portion of the U.S. state of South Carolina that comprises roughly the eastern third and the southern tip. The numbering plan area (NPA) includes the Grand Strand, the Lowcountry, the Pee Dee, and the Sandhills. Major cities in the region are Myrtle Beach, Charleston, Beaufort, Hilton Head Island and Florence. Area code 843 was created in 1998 when area code 803 was split, while 854 was added in 2015 to form an all-services overlay.

== History ==
Area code 843 entered service on March 22, 1998, created in a split of area code 803. In 2013, the NANP Administrator determined that 843 would run out of central office prefixes in 2015. In addition to the rapid growth of the Grand Strand, Charleston and Beaufort/Hilton Head areas, most of the southern portion of the numbering plan area is part of the Savannah, Georgia LATA.

On December 9, 2013, it was decided that the 843 territory would receive the state's first all-service overlay. On December 16, 2013, the new area code of 854, approved by the South Carolina Public Service Commission, was announced. 854 entered service on March 14, 2015. Permissive dialing continued until September 18, 2015, during which both seven- and ten-digit dialing were supported. On September 19, 2015, ten-digit dialing became mandatory in the 843/854 territory. The first new 854 numbers were issued sometime in the fall of 2015.

== Service area ==
=== Counties ===
- Florence
- Darlington
- Horry
- Marion
- Dillon
- Marlboro
- Chesterfield
- Berkeley
- Charleston
- Georgetown
- Williamsburg
- Colleton
- Jasper
- Beaufort

=== Major communities ===
Major cities within the area code are in bold.

- Andrews
- Atlantic Beach
- Aynor
- Awendaw
- Beaufort
- Bennettsville
- Bethune
- Blenheim
- Bluffton
- Briarcliffe Acres
- Carolina Forest
- **Charleston**
- Conway
- Darlington
- Dillon
- Edisto Beach
- **Florence**
- Folly Beach
- Garden City Beach
- Georgetown
- Goose Creek
- Hanahan
- Hardeeville
- Hartsville
- Hemingway
- **Hilton Head Island**
- Isle of Palms
- Jamestown
- Johns Island
- Johnsonville
- Kingstree
- Ladson
- Lake City
- Lake View
- Lamar
- Latta
- Little River
- Loris
- Longs
- Marion
- McBee
- McClellanville
- McColl
- Moncks Corner
- Mt. Pleasant
- Mullins
- Murrells Inlet
- **Myrtle Beach**
- Nesmith
- Nichols
- **North Charleston**
- North Hartsville
- North Myrtle Beach
- Okatie
- Pageland
- Pawleys Island
- Port Royal
- Quinby
- Red Hill
- Ridgeland
- Socastee
- Society Hill
- St. Stephen
- Stuckey
- Sullivans Island
- Summerville
- Surfside Beach
- Timmonsville
- Turbeville
- Wallace
- Walterboro

== See also ==
- List of North American Numbering Plan area codes
- List of South Carolina area codes

South Carolina area codes: 803/839, 843/854, 864/821
	North: 704/980, 910/472	
West: 803/839	Area code 843/854	East: Atlantic Ocean, 441
	South: 912	
North Carolina area codes: 252, 336/743, 704/980, 828, 910/472, 919/984
Georgia area codes: 229, 404, 478, 678/470/943, 706/762, 770, 912
