= National Register of Historic Places listings in Marion County, South Carolina =

Location of Marion County in South Carolina

This is a list of the National Register of Historic Places listings in Marion County, South Carolina.

This is intended to be a complete list of the properties and districts on the National Register of Historic Places in Marion County, South Carolina, United States. The locations of National Register properties and districts for which the latitude and longitude coordinates are included below, may be seen in a map.

There are 13 properties and districts listed on the National Register in the county, including 2 National Historic Landmarks. An additional 2 properties were once listed, but have been removed.

This National Park Service list is complete through NPS recent listings posted March 21, 2025.

== Current listings ==
	Name on the Register	Image	Date listed	Location	City or town	Description
1	A.H. Buchan Company Building	A.H. Buchan Company Building	August 3, 1984 (#84003817)	Laurel St. 34°12′13″N 79°15′12″W	Mullins	
2	Dew Barn		August 3, 1984 (#84003818)	Northwest of Zion; 34°17′04″N 79°21′29″W	Zion	
3	Dillard Barn	Dillard Barn	September 28, 2005 (#05001101)	719 Virginia Dr. 34°10′04″N 79°14′09″W	Mullins	
4	Imperial Tobacco Company Building	Imperial Tobacco Company Building	August 3, 1984 (#84003820)	416 N. Mullins St. 34°12′21″N 79°15′00″W	Mullins	
5	Liberty Warehouse	Liberty Warehouse	August 3, 1984 (#84003821)	Park St. 34°12′10″N 79°15′03″W	Mullins	
6	Marion High School	Marion High School	June 6, 2001 (#01000631)	719 N. Main St. 34°11′06″N 79°24′05″W	Marion	Former high school, now the headquarters for the Marion County School District
7	Marion Historic District	Marion Historic District	October 4, 1973 (#73001720)	Roughly bounded by E. and W. Dozier, N. Montgomery, W. Baptist, and N. Wilcox Sts.; also roughly bounded by Railroad and N. Wilcox Aves., N. Main and W. Dozier Sts., and Wheeler, Lee, and Arch Sts. 34°10′40″N 79°23′53″W	Marion	Second set of boundaries represents a boundary increase of April 20, 1979
8	Mt. Olive Baptist Church	Mt. Olive Baptist Church	June 15, 2000 (#00000695)	301 Church St. 34°12′37″N 79°15′01″W	Mullins	
9	Mullins Commercial Historic District	Mullins Commercial Historic District	July 20, 2003 (#03000662)	Along portions of Main, Front, and W. Wine Sts. 34°12′13″N 79°15′20″W	Mullins	
10	Neal and Dixon's Warehouse	Neal and Dixon's Warehouse	August 3, 1984 (#84003822)	S. Main St. 34°12′09″N 79°15′10″W	Mullins	
11	Old Ebenezer Church		March 30, 1973 (#73001719)	5 miles south of Latta on South Carolina Highway 38; 34°17′20″N 79°23′10″W	Latta	
12	Rasor and Clardy Company Building	Rasor and Clardy Company Building	October 29, 1982 (#82001522)	202 S. Main St. 34°12′13″N 79°15′15″W	Mullins	
13	Richardson-Godbold House		June 25, 2018 (#100002599)	8447 S SC 41; 33°59′12″N 79°20′55″W	Marion vicinity	

== Former listings ==
	Name on the Register	Image	Date listed	Date removed	Location	City or town	Description
1	Old Brick Warehouse		August 3, 1984 (#84003828)	August 9, 2016	Northwest corner of Main and Wine Sts. 34°12′24″N 79°15′20″W	Mullins	Demolished in August, 2014.
2	J.C. Teasley House	J.C. Teasley House	May 30, 2001 (#01000609)	August 9, 2016	131 E. Wine St. 34°12′29″N 79°15′15″W	Mullins	Demolished in 2015

== See also ==
- List of National Historic Landmarks in South Carolina
- National Register of Historic Places listings in South Carolina
