= Dew House =

Dew House and variations may refer to:

in the United States

(by state then county)

- Daniel Dew House, Petersburg, Kentucky, listed on the National Register of Historic Places (NRHP) in Boone County
- Bullock-Dew House, Sims, North Carolina, NRHP-listed in Wilson County
- Dew House (Nelsonville, Ohio), NRHP-listed in Athens County
- Dew Barn, Zion, South Carolina, NRHP-listed in Marion County
- Dew Plantation House, Missouri City, Texas, historic house relocated to a county park in Fort Bend County
