= T. J. Sanders =

American football player (born 2003)

No. 98 – Buffalo Bills
- Position: Defensive tackle
- Roster status: Active

Personal information
- Born: July 30, 2003 (age 23)
- Listed height: 6 ft 4 in (1.93 m)
- Listed weight: 297 lb (135 kg)

Career information
- High school: Marion (SC)
- College: South Carolina (2021–2024)
- NFL draft: 2025: 2nd round, 41st overall pick

Career history
- Buffalo Bills (2025–present)

Career NFL statistics as of Week 10, 2026
- Total tackles: 27
- Sacks: 1
- Pass deflections: 1
- Stats at Pro Football Reference

Tanaeri J. Sanders (born July 30, 2003) is an American professional football defensive tackle for the Buffalo Bills of the National Football League (NFL). He played college football for the South Carolina Gamecocks and was selected by the Bills in the second round of the 2025 NFL draft.

== Early life ==
Sanders attended Marion High School in Marion, South Carolina. He committed to the University of South Carolina to play college football.

== College career ==
In his first year at South Carolina in 2021, Sanders played in two games and redshirted. As a redshirt freshman in 2022, he played in 12 games and had 16 tackles and one sack. As a redshirt sophomore in 2023, he started seven of 12 games, recording 43 tackles and 4.5 sacks. Sanders returned to South Carolina for his redshirt junior season in 2024.

== Professional career ==
Pre-draft measurables
Height	Weight	Arm length	Hand span	Wingspan	40-yard dash	10-yard split	20-yard split	20-yard shuttle	Three-cone drill	Vertical jump	Broad jump
6 ft 3 7/8 in (1.93 m)	297 lb (135 kg)	33 1/8 in (0.84 m)	10 1/4 in (0.26 m)	6 ft 8 7/8 in (2.05 m)	4.99 s	1.67 s	2.87 s	4.67 s	7.70 s	31.5 in (0.80 m)	9 ft 4 in (2.84 m)
All values from NFL Combine/Pro Day

Sanders was selected in the second round with the 41st overall pick in the 2025 NFL draft by the Buffalo Bills. On October 11, 2025, Sanders was placed on injured reserve due to a knee surgery that was required after Week 4. On November 15, Sanders was activated ahead of the team's Week 11 matchup against the Tampa Bay Buccaneers.
