= Louis Cooper =

American football player (born 1963)

No. 55, 50, 52
- Position: Linebacker

Personal information
- Born: August 5, 1963 (age 63); Marion, South Carolina, U.S.
- Listed height: 6 ft 2 in (1.88 m)
- Listed weight: 240 lb (109 kg)

Career information
- High school: Marion
- College: Western Carolina
- NFL draft: 1985: 11th round, 305th overall pick

Career history
- Seattle Seahawks (1985)*; Kansas City Chiefs (1985–1990); Miami Dolphins (1991); Philadelphia Eagles (1993)
- * Offseason or practice squad member only

Career NFL statistics
- Sacks: 7.5
- Interceptions: 1
- Fumble recoveries: 2
- Stats at Pro Football Reference

Alexander Louis Cooper (born August 5, 1963) is an American former professional football player who was a linebacker in the National Football League (NFL) from 1985 to 1993, primarily for the Kansas City Chiefs. He played college football for the Western Carolina Catamounts. He was selected by the Seattle Seahawks in the 11th round of the 1985 NFL draft.
