= Marion County Airport (South Carolina) =

- IATA: none; ICAO: KMAO; FAA LID: MAO

Summary
- Airport type: Public
- Owner: Marion County
- Serves: Marion, South Carolina
- Elevation AMSL: 92 ft / 28 m
- Coordinates: 34°10′52″N 079°20′05″W

Map
- Location of airport in South Carolina

Runways
Direction	Length		Surface
Direction	ft	m	Surface
4/22	4,504	1,373	Asphalt

Statistics (2011)
- Aircraft operations: 6,000
- Based aircraft: 9
- Source: Federal Aviation Administration

Marion County Airport (ICAO: KMAO, FAA LID: MAO) is a county-owned, public-use airport in Marion County, South Carolina, United States. It is located three nautical miles (6 km) east of the central business district of Marion, South Carolina. This airport is included in the National Plan of Integrated Airport Systems for 2011–2015, which categorized it as a general aviation facility.

Although many U.S. airports use the same three-letter location identifier for the FAA and IATA, this airport is assigned MAO by the FAA but has no designation from the IATA (which assigned MAO to Eduardo Gomes International Airport in Manaus, Amazonas, Brazil).

== Facilities and aircraft ==
Marion County Airport covers an area of 130 acres (53 ha) at an elevation of 92 feet (28 m) above mean sea level. It has one runway designated 4/22 with an asphalt surface measuring 4,504 by 100 feet (1,373 x 30 m).

For the 12-month period ending March 17, 2011, the airport had 6,000 aircraft operations, an average of 16 per day: 98% general aviation and 2% military. At that time there were 9 aircraft based at this airport: 89% single-engine and 11% multi-engine.

== See also ==
- List of airports in South Carolina
