= Edgar L. McGowan =

American lawyer

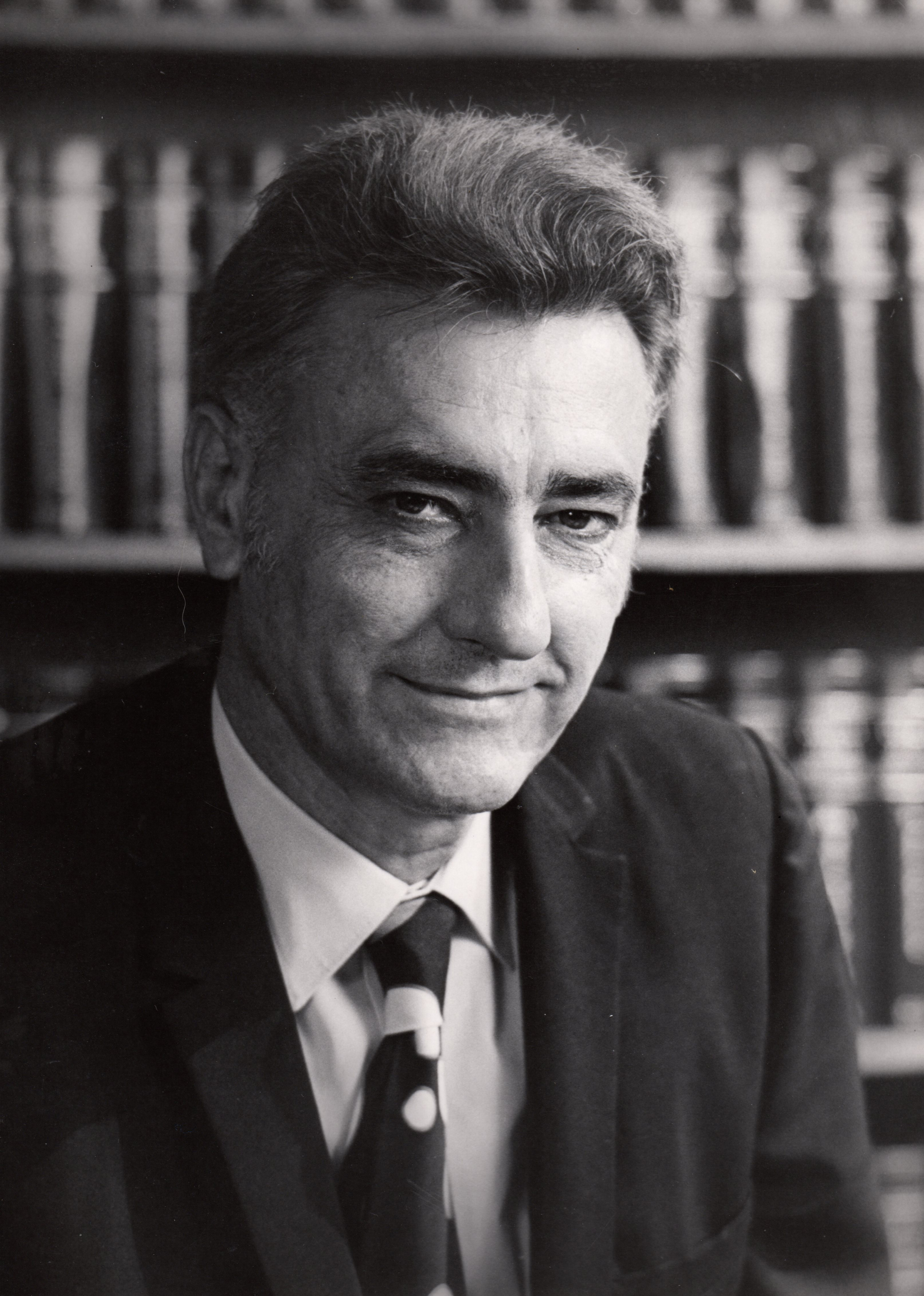
Edgar L. McGowan

Edgar L. McGowan (June 1, 1920 – February 20, 2004) was the first and longest-serving Commissioner of the South Carolina Department of Labor. He served as Commissioner of Labor from February 7, 1971, to June 30, 1989.

== Personal life ==
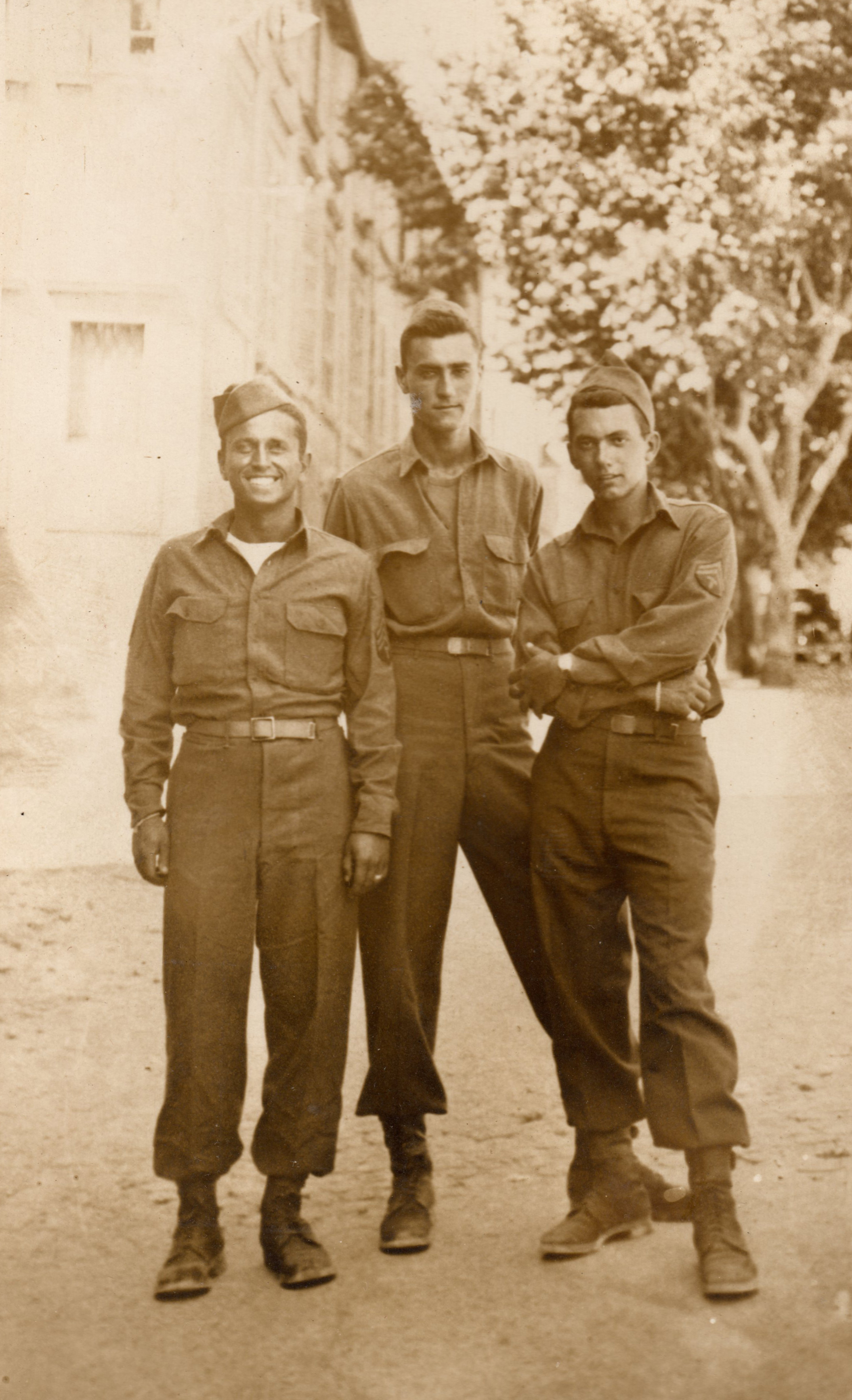
McGowan in Avignon, France, 1945

Edgar McGowan was born on June 1, 1920, in Conway, South Carolina. He spent his youth in Mullins, South Carolina. After high school, he attended the University of Alabama where he met his wife, Mildred Parris of Painter, Alabama, a small town outside of Geraldine, Alabama. They eloped in Columbus, Mississippi on April 3, 1941. When World War II began, they joined the Signal Corp where they served together. From June 1945 until the end of the war, Ed McGowan served in the United States Army in combat zones throughout the European Theater of Operations, primarily in France.

At the conclusion of the war, he returned to his home state of South Carolina to pursue a degree in accounting at the University of South Carolina. He received a Bachelors of Arts (Cum Laude, 1947) and a Masters of Accounting (1955). After graduation in 1947, he founded the Southeastern Audit & Tax Co. located then at 1329 1/2 Main St, in Columbia, South Carolina. He passed the examination for qualification to become a Certified Public Accountant in November, 1947 and, having obtained the two years of required experience, was issued the certificate on June 30, 1950. Later, he received a L.L.B. law degree from the University of South Carolina School of Law in 1961. He took the bar exam in February 1961 and was one of only ten students admitted to the South Carolina Bar on April 8, 1961. While still a student in 1946, he began teaching classes at the university, initially as an instructor, then as an associate professor, and finally as an adjunct professor in accounting at University of South Carolina School of Business. "'He always said that he was happiest when he was teaching his students', said his wife, Mildred McGowan." He continued to be a professor until appointed as Commissioner of Labor in 1971.

Prior to becoming Commissioner of Labor, he was elected to the town council of Forest Acres, South Carolina, and served as Treasurer to the South Carolina Democratic Party. After he retired from the state, he worked as an attorney for Constangy, Brooks, & Smith, LLP in Columbia, just one block from where he started his accounting firm. He was married to Mildred Parris McGowan until his passing. He had one son, Edgar "Lin" McGowan and one grandson, Jonathan "Jon" McGowan. He died on February 20, 2004, and is buried at Cameron Cemetery in Cameron, South Carolina.

== Commissioner of Labor ==
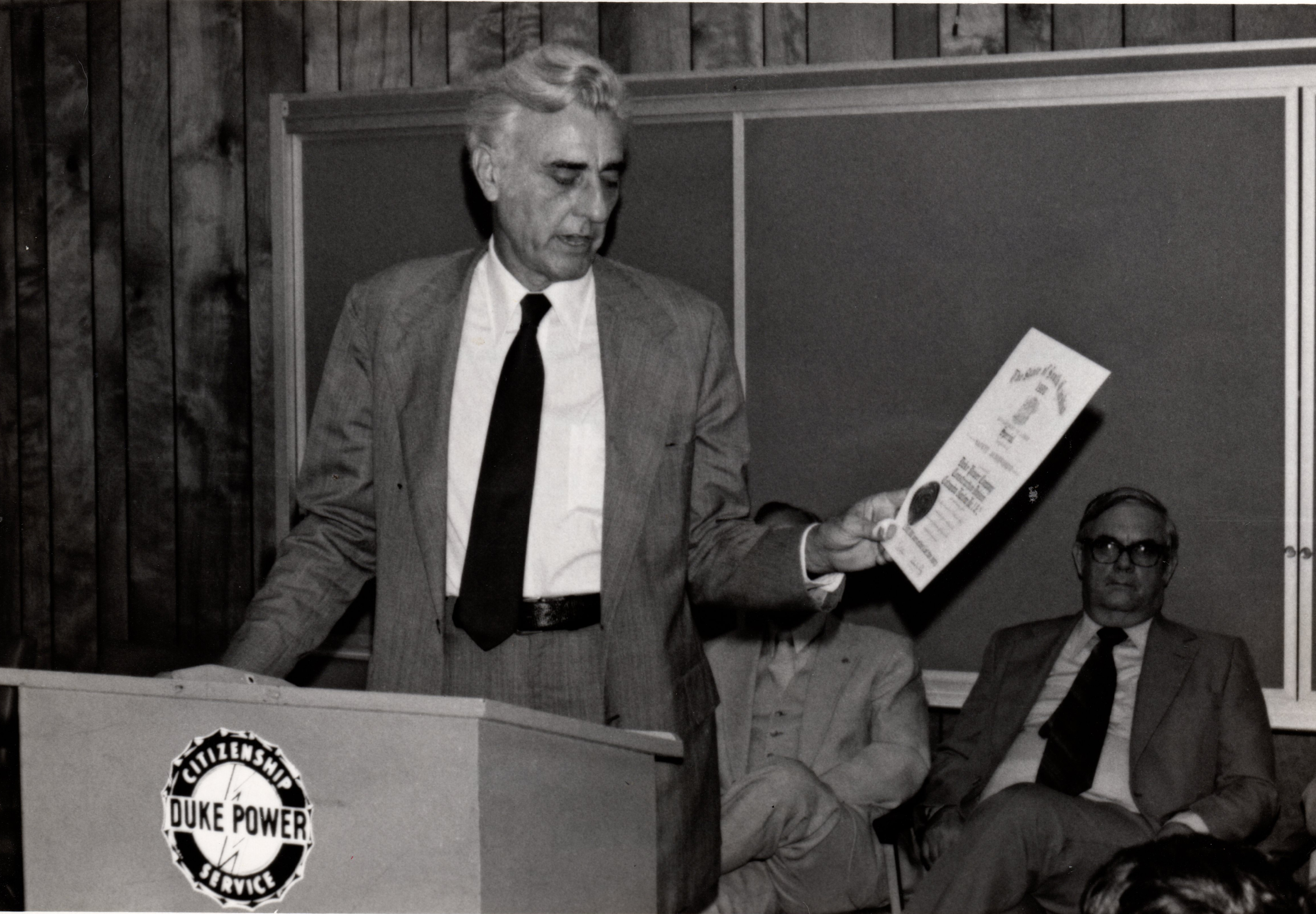
McGowan presents Duke Energy Award.

On December 29, 1970, Richard Nixon signed the Occupational Safety and Health Act establishing the Occupational Safety and Health Administration (OSHA). A provision in the Occupational Safety and Health Act allowed states to create their own state agencies, rather than falling under the federal program. In 1971, McGowan worked with the South Carolina State Legislature to pass the South Carolina Occupational Safety and Health Act, the first in the country, creating the South Carolina Department of Labor. "Whenever the OSHA act was passed, I saw the opportunity in South Carolina to assist both businessmen and employees of the state because I knew we could run a better program than the feds". Once the agency was created, Governor John C. West appointed McGowan in 1971 to temporarily head the new agency. McGowan was reappointed by Governor James B. Edwards and Governor Richard Riley. Following the election of Carroll A. Campbell Jr. in 1987, McGowan retired when his term expired in 1989.

In his role as Commissioner of Labor, he was often called upon to moderate labor disputes and to weigh in on the economic impact of new proposals. He was involved in the regulating cotton dust standards, and enforcement of the 1987 Aids Rule.

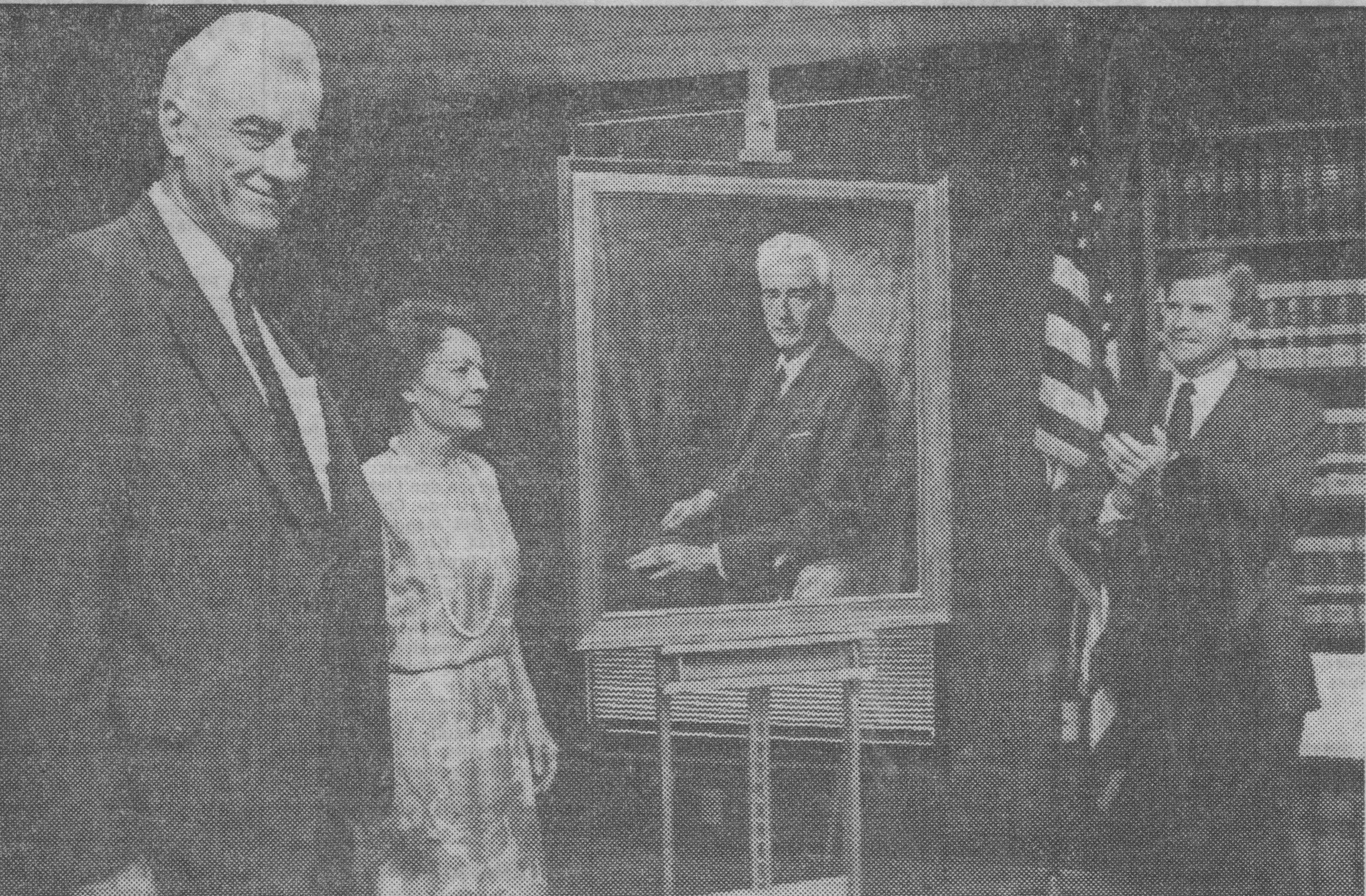
McGowan and Governor Campbell after his portrait was unveiled

McGowan was viewed as a fair commissioner. From a 2004 article in The State "'He gave a chance to females and blacks and average Joes like me, who wasn't very educated when he hired me in 1978' said Ron Creamer who left the Labor Department in 1990. 'Selecting you as Labor Commissioner was certainly one of the best (if not the best) appointments I made during my term as Governor,' West wrote when McGowan announced his retirement."

After his retirement, he was succeeded by Virgil W. Duffie Jr. In 1994, the State of South Carolina restructured the Department of Labor, creating the Department of Labor, Licensing, and Regulation. That change also brought a title change for the agency head from Commissioner of Labor to Director of the Department of Labor, Licensing, and Regulation.

== Awards and recognition ==
McGowan served as president of the National Association of Governmental Labor Officials (NAGLO) and chairman of the Occupational Safety and Health State Plans Association. He received the William Steiger Memorial Award for individuals from the social/political sphere whose efforts have contributed to advancements in occupational safety and health in 1983. On April 1, 1973, Alabama Governor George Wallace made McGowan an Honorary Lieutenant Colonel Aide-De-Camp in the Alabama State Militia. In 1955, he was listed in the international edition of "Who's Who in Commerce and Industry" and "Who's Who in American Education". On June 9, 1986, Governor Richard Riley awarded him The Order of the Palmetto, designating him a Palmetto Gentleman. When he died, the South Carolina State Senate passed resolution 1014 on February 26, 2004, honoring his service and contributions to the State of South Carolina.

== Legacy ==
The Edgar L. McGowan Award is given by the South Carolina Occupational Safety Council to the company with the most hours logged since their last lost-time incident.
