= William J. Montgomery =

American politician, lawyer, bank president (1851–1913)

William Joseph Montgomery
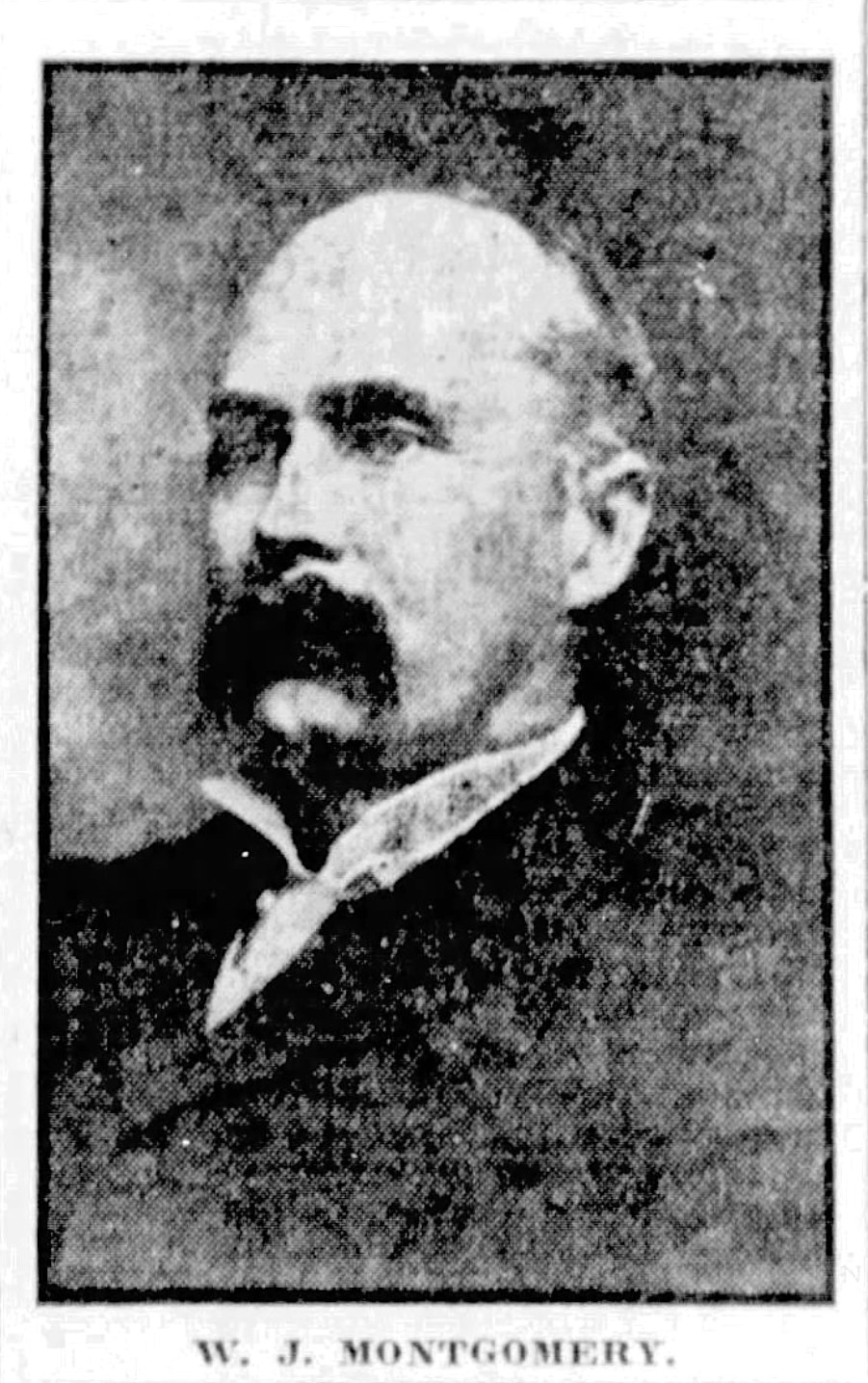

South Carolina House of Representatives, Marion County, 55th Assembly
- In office 1882–1883

South Carolina House of Representatives, Marion County, 63rd Assembly
- In office 1889–1890

Mayor of Marion, South Carolina
- In office 1891–1892

South Carolina Senate, 68th Assembly, Marion County
- In office 1909–1910

South Carolina Senate, 69th Assembly, Marion County
- In office 1911–1912

Personal details
- Born: May 20, 1851 Marion County, South Carolina, U.S.
- Died: March 18, 1913 (aged 61) Richmond, Virginia, U.S.
- Resting place: Old Town Cemetery, Marion, South Carolina, U.S.
- Spouse: Annie Stackhouse (m. 1877)
- Children: 6, including Mabel Montgomery
- Occupation: Politician, lawyer, bank president

William Joseph Montgomery, also known as W. J. Montgomery (May 20, 1851 – March 18, 1913) was an American politician, lawyer and a bank president. He was mayor of the city of Marion, South Carolina in 1891, and he served in the South Carolina House of Representatives (1882–1883, 1889–1890), and in the South Carolina Senate (1909–1912).

He was married in 1877 to Annie Stackhouse, and together they had 6 children. Writer Mabel Montgomery was one of his children. Their former home "The Grove" (1893) at 408 Harlee Street, was listed in 1973 by the National Register of Historic Places as part of the Marion Historic District.

Montgomery died of carcinoma of the pancreas on March 18, 1913, in a hospital in Richmond, Virginia.

== See also ==
- List of South Carolina state legislatures
