= Mabel Montgomery (writer) =

American writer (1879–1968)

- Born: Annie Mable Montgomery; October 19, 1879; Marion, South Carolina, U.S.
- Died: November 17, 1968 (aged 89); Marion, South Carolina, U.S.
- Resting place: Old Town Cemetery, Marion, South Carolina, U.S.
- Occupations: Writer, children's book author, photographer, clubwoman
- Father: William Joseph Montgomery

Annie Mabel Montgomery, commonly known as Mabel Montgomery (October 19, 1879 – November 17, 1968) was an American writer, photographer and clubwoman in South Carolina. She served as the South Carolina director of the Federal Writers' Project, housed at the University of South Carolina. Montgomery authored several works, including the children's book David’s Fishing Summer (1953).

== Early life and education ==
Mabel Montgomery was born on October 19, 1879, in Marion, South Carolina to parents Annie Stackhouse and William Joseph Montgomery (commonly known as W. J. Montgomery). Her father was a lawyer, bank president, the mayor of Marion in 1891, and also served multiple terms in the South Carolina House of Representatives, and in the South Carolina Senate. Her former childhood home "The Grove" (1893) at 408 Harlee Street, was listed in 1973 by the National Register of Historic Places as part of the Marion Historic District.

Montgomery graduated from Winthrop College, and Columbia College. Additionally she attended courses at Columbia University.

Mabel spent many summers in the 1920s with her sister Belle Montgomery Tilghman and brother-in-law Horace Tilghman Sr. at their plantation house in Tilghman Point in Little River Neck area of North Myrtle Beach. She was an artist-in-residence at MacDowell Colony in Peterborough, New Hampshire.

== Career ==
Montgomery regularly contributed her writings to newspaper and magazine features. In 1910, she edited South Carolina Epworth League page in the Southern Christian Advocate weekly newspaper. She claimed to have written a letter to the "Yankee" captain that "raided" Confederate Fort Randall near North Myrtle Beach, South Carolina.

Montgomery served as the South Carolina state director of the South Carolina Writers' Project, a Federal Writers' Project of the Works Progress Administration from 1935 until 1941, housed on the campus of the University of South Carolina. Louise Jones DuBose served as her assistant director. Together they authored South Carolina: A Guide to the Palmetto State (1941). In the guidebook South Carolina's black residents were featured in unflattering depictions described as "minstrel-esque," however Montgomery defended the writings, which drew rebuke and alterations from her supervisor.

While working at the Federal Writers' Project she took local photographs, which include a cotton house on highway 21, and cotton farming scenes. Many of her photos can be found in a collection at the South Caroliniana Library at University of South Carolina.

Montgomery served on the Marion Methodist Board of Stewards. She led the church's primary department for 30 years. Montgomery was on the local school board in Marion, and also served on the first South Carolina board for literacy.

She also established a local newsletter for soldiers during World War II, called Marion Mail; and helped establish in 1910 the South Carolina Industrial School for Boys (also called South Carolina Industrial School for White Boys) in Florence, South Carolina, an early private juvenile reformatory institution led by trustees.

Montgomery led the South Carolina Federation of Women's Clubs' student loan fund, where she served as vice president.

She died at age 89 on November 17, 1968, in Marion.

== Publications ==
- South Carolina Writers' Project (1938). Palmetto Pioneers: Six Stories of Early South Carolinians. South Carolina Division of Adult Education.; co-authored
- South Carolina Writers' Project (1941). South Carolina: A Guide to the Palmetto State. Oxford University Press and Burnet R. Maybank.; co-authored
- Montgomery, Mabel (1951). A Courageous Conquest: The Life Story of Franklin Delano Roosevelt. Globe Book Company.
- Montgomery, Mabel (1953). David's Fishing Summer. Chicago: Wilcox and Follett Company.
- Montgomery, Mabel (1959). Bud and Samson, the Goat. New York City: Vantage Press.
- Montgomery, Mabel (1963). South Carolina's Wil Lou Gray: Pioneer in Adult Education. Opportunity School.; about educator Wil Lou Gray
