= Louise Jones DuBose =

Louise Jones DuBose (1901 – 1985), who sometimes wrote under the pen name Nancy Telfair, was an American author, educator, and reporter.

Louise Jones DuBose was born in 1901 to Rev. Frank Dudley Jones and Catherine Wyman. She attended Agnes Scott College in Decatur, Georgia and Chicora College for Women in Columbia, South Carolina. She then studied at the University of South Carolina from which she received a bachelor's degree in 1920.

She wrote A History of Columbus, Georgia. She wrote plays. She published a collection of folktales. She wrote about Blondelle Malone.

She was an associate editor of South Carolina Magazine and was the second director of the University of South Carolina Press (1950–1966). She wrote scripts for the Palmetto Landmarks radio program.

For the Works Progress Administration (WPA), she worked under Mabel Montgomery on the South Carolina Writing Project. She conducted interviews and took photographs.

Several of her recipes were published.

== Recognition ==
DuBose was interviewed in 1981 for the South Carolina Oral History Collection. In 2001, DuBose was inducted into the South Carolina Academy of Authors. The South Carolina Library at the University of South Carolina has a collection of her papers.

== Writings ==
- Women in Columbus 1828–1928, unpublished
- A History of Columbus, Georgia, 1828–1928, a book consisting of more than 100 biographies
- South Carolina Folktales (1941)
- Windstar (1943), book of poetry
- South Carolina Lives; The Palmetto's Who's Who (1963)

== See also ==
- Ambrose E. Gonzales, writer
