= South Carolina Department of Labor =

The South Carolina Department of Labor was formed in 1971 by South Carolina State Legislature through the South Carolina Occupational Safety and Health Act. The first Commissioner of Labor was Edgar L. McGowan who served from 1971–1986. He was succeeded by Virgil W. Duffie, Jr. In 1994, the State of South Carolina restructured the Department of Labor, creating the Department of Labor, Licensing, and Regulation. That change also brought a title change for the agency head from Commissioner of Labor to Director of the Department of Labor, Licensing, and Regulation.
