= Imperial Tobacco Company Building =

Historic tobacco processing facility in South Carolina

- U.S. National Register of Historic Places
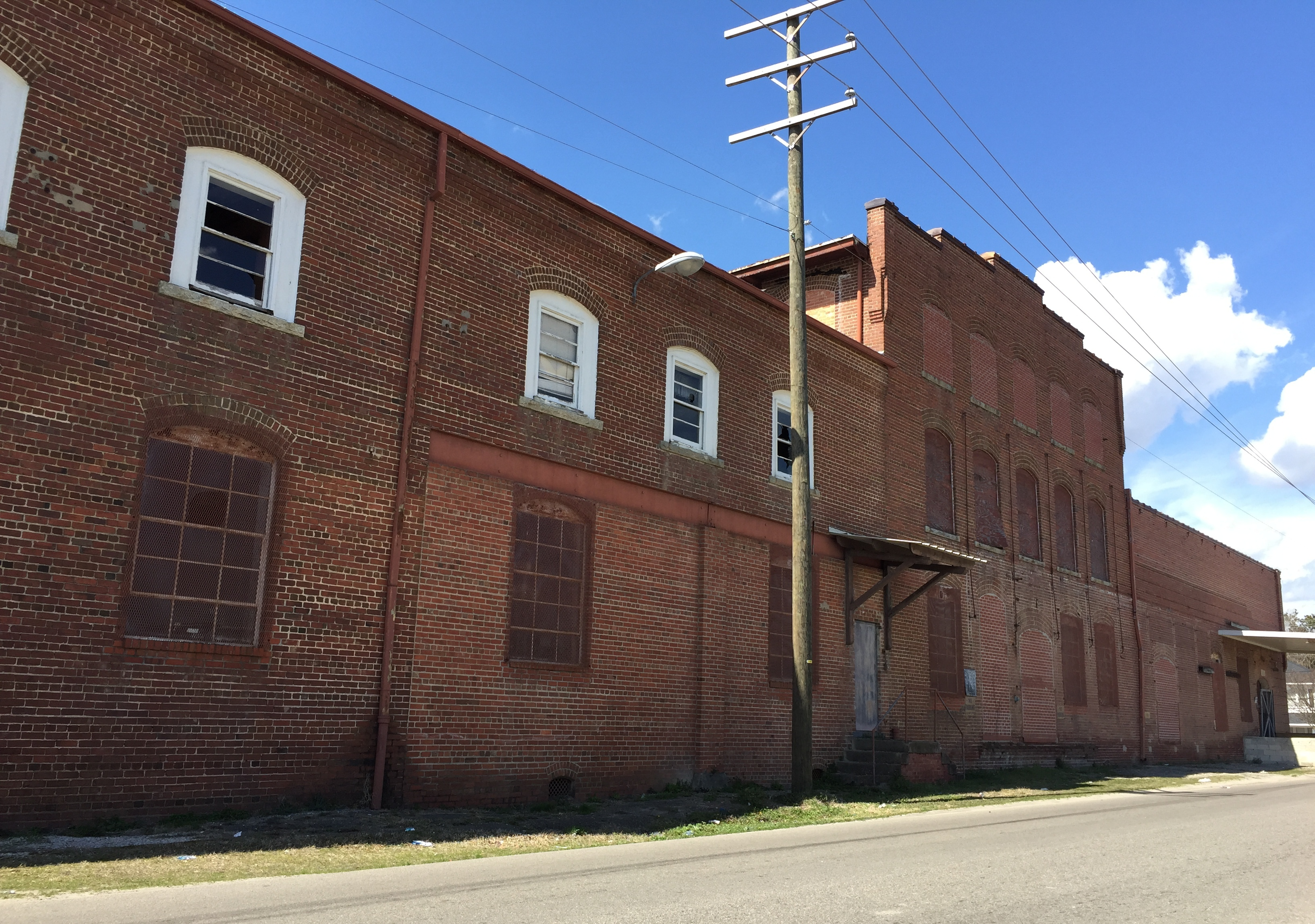

- Location within South Carolina Location within the United States
- Location: 416 N. Mullins St., Mullins, South Carolina
- Coordinates: 34°12′21″N 79°15′0″W
- Area: 4.6 acres (1.9 ha)
- Built: 1908-1913
- MPS: Flue-Cured Tobacco Production Properties TR
- NRHP reference No.: 84003820
- Added to NRHP: August 3, 1984

Imperial Tobacco Company Building, also known as the Marvel Lighting Company Building, is a historic tobacco processing facility located at Mullins, Marion County, South Carolina. It was built between 1908 and 1913 by the Imperial Tobacco Company of Great Britain and Ireland, Inc., and at its construction was the largest redrying plant in Mullins. It consists of a three-story, brick main block, with stepped parapets and ten additions of varying age. The plant was used to buy, dry, and export tobacco.

It was listed in the National Register of Historic Places in 1984.
