= Liberty Warehouse =

- U.S. National Register of Historic Places
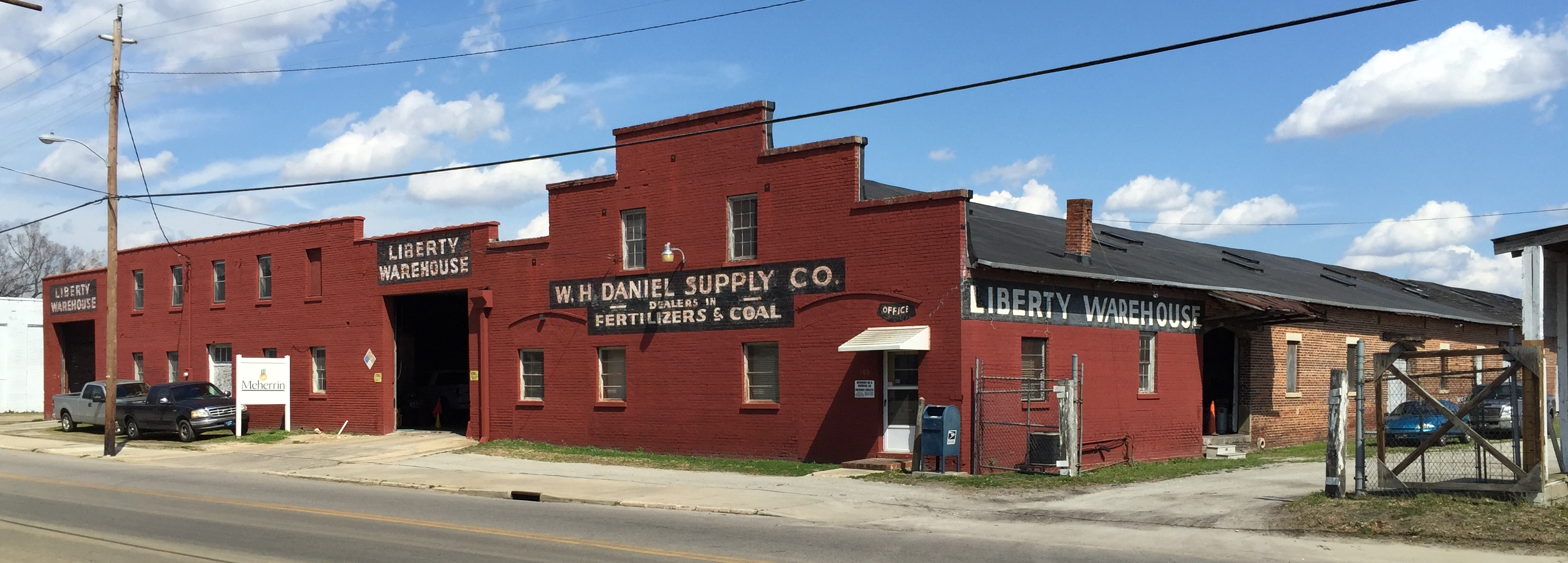

- Location within South Carolina Location within the United States
- Location: Park St., Mullins, South Carolina
- Coordinates: 34°12′10″N 79°15′3″W
- Area: 2.5 acres (1.0 ha)
- Built: c. 1923
- MPS: Flue-Cured Tobacco Production Properties TR
- NRHP reference No.: 84003821
- Added to NRHP: August 3, 1984

Liberty Warehouse is a historic tobacco warehouse located at Mullins, Marion County, South Carolina. It was built about 1923, and is a 1 1/2-story, brick warehouse. It features stepped parapets and has a metal double gable roof. The warehouse is associated with the Daniel family, the most prominent family associated with tobacco in Mullins.

It was listed in the National Register of Historic Places in 1984.
