= A. H. Buchan Company Building =

- U.S. National Register of Historic Places
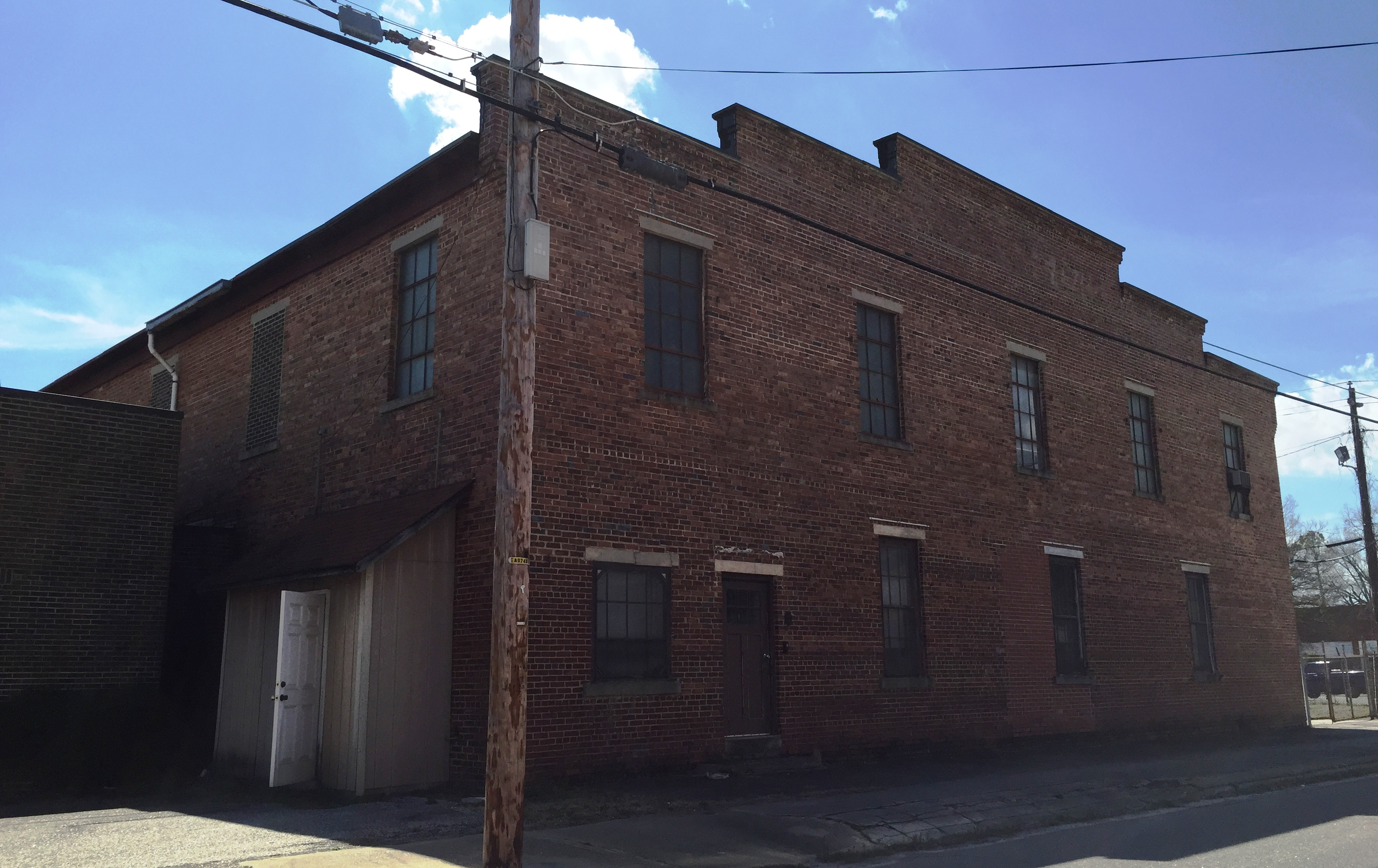

- Location within South Carolina Location within the United States
- Location: Laurel St., Mullins, South Carolina
- Coordinates: 34°12′13″N 79°15′12″W
- Area: 0.4 acres (0.16 ha)
- Built: 1924-1930
- MPS: Flue-Cured Tobacco Production Properties TR
- NRHP reference No.: 84003817
- Added to NRHP: August 3, 1984

The A. H. Buchan Company Building, also known as Supreme Lighting, is a historic tobacco processing facility located at Mullins, Marion County, South Carolina. It was built between 1924 and 1930, and is a two-story, brick building. It features a stepped parapet on the façade. The building was used for the purpose of buying, drying and exporting tobacco. The A. H. Buchan Company operated in this building until 1964.

It was listed in the National Register of Historic Places in 1984.
