= Mt. Olive Baptist Church (Mullins, South Carolina) =

Historic church in South Carolina, United States

- U.S. National Register of Historic Places
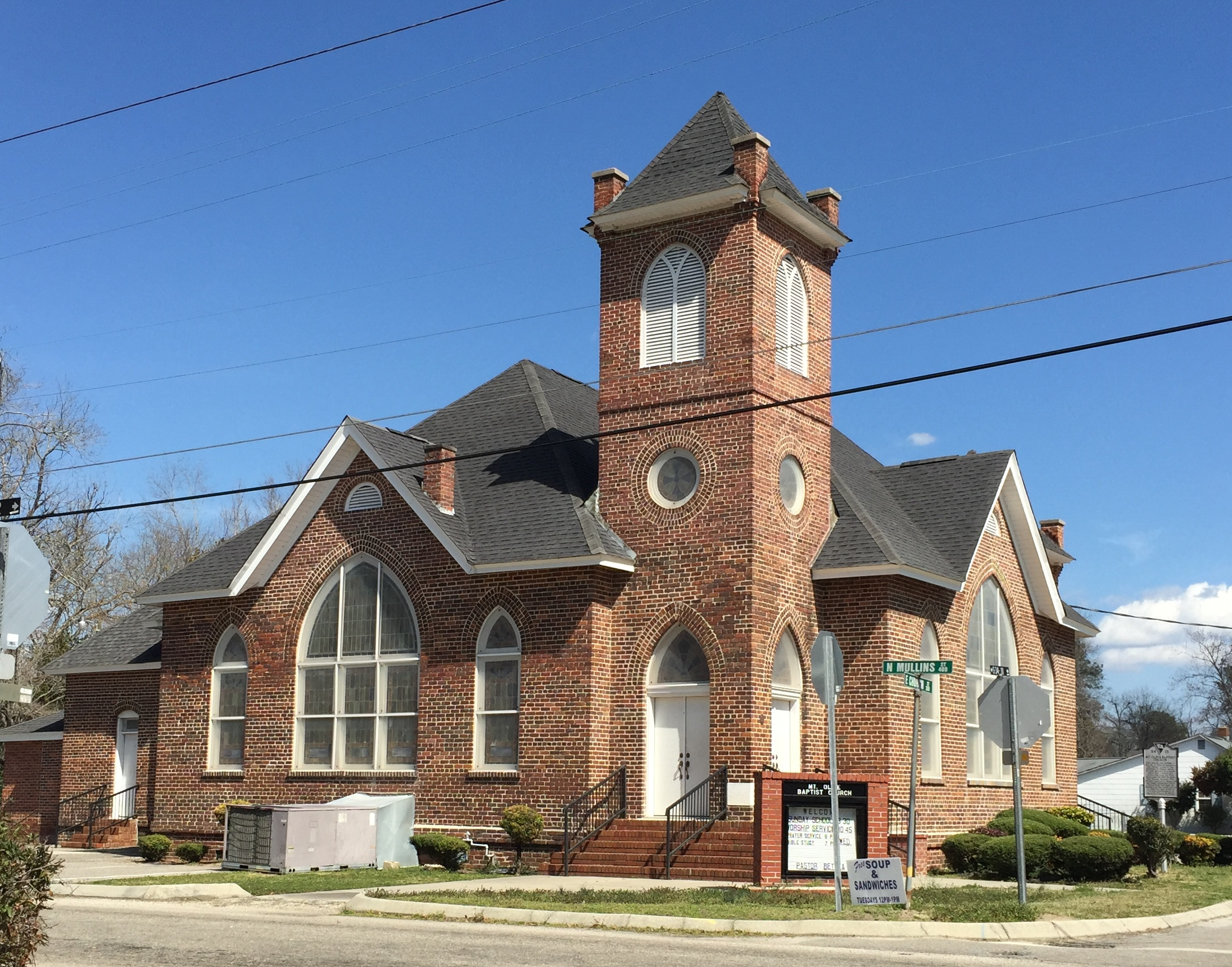

- Location within South Carolina Location within the United States
- Location: 301 Church St., Mullins, South Carolina
- Coordinates: 34°12′37″N 79°15′1″W
- Area: less than one acre
- Built: 1922-1926
- Architect: Ford, Wade Alston
- Architectural style: Late Gothic Revival
- NRHP reference No.: 00000695
- Added to NRHP: June 15, 2000

Mt. Olive Baptist Church is a historic Baptist church located at 301 Church Street in Mullins, Marion County, South Carolina. It was built between 1922 and 1926, and is a one-story, Late Gothic Revival style brick cruciform building. It has a complex hip and gable roof and features twin corner towers of unequal height, a stained glass oculus above each entrance at the second level, a belfry containing four large pointed arch openings, and a large tripartite Gothic-arched leaded stained glass window flanked by stained glass lancet windows. The church played a major role in the African-American community in Mullins.

It was added to the National Register of Historic Places in 2000.
