= J.C. Teasley House =

Historic house in South Carolina, United States

- U.S. National Register of Historic Places
- U.S. Historic district – Contributing property
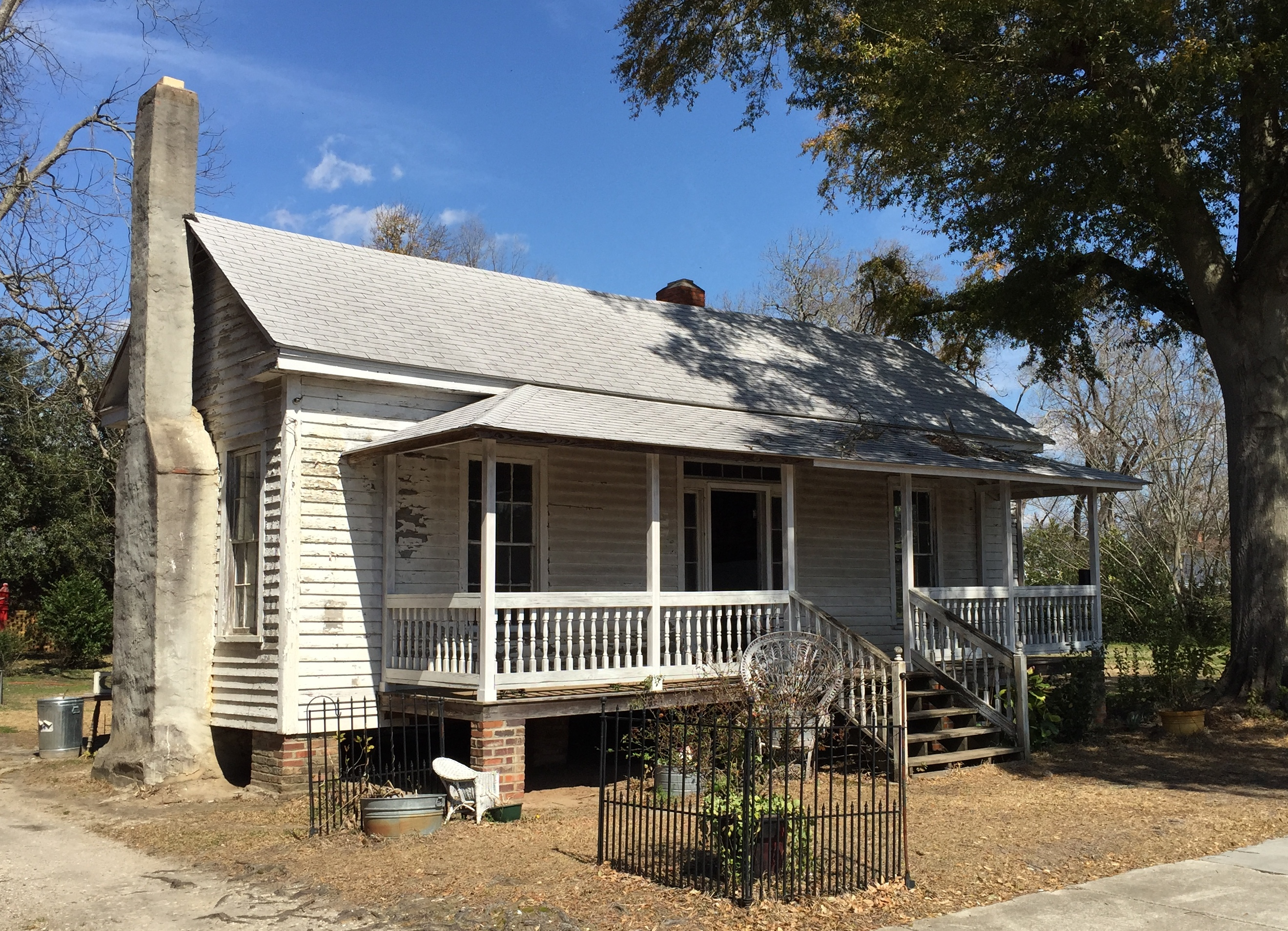

- Location within South Carolina Location within the United States
- Location: 131 E. Wine St., Mullins, South Carolina
- Coordinates: 34°12′29″N 79°15′15″W
- Area: less than one acre
- Architectural style: Mid- to late 19th century
- MPS: Flue-Cured Tobacco Production Properties TR
- NRHP reference No.: 01000609
- Added to NRHP: May 30, 2001

J.C. Teasley House was a historic home located at Mullins, Marion County, South Carolina. The house consisted of the original block built about 1875, with a post-1901 wing, which became the principal façade of the house. It was a modest single-story frame house constructed in a classic folk form quite common throughout the rural South. It was the home of James Chesley Teasley (1861-1942), a prominent Marion County businessman. It is located in the Mullins Commercial Historic District.

It was listed in the National Register of Historic Places in 2001.
