= Dillard Barn =

- U.S. National Register of Historic Places
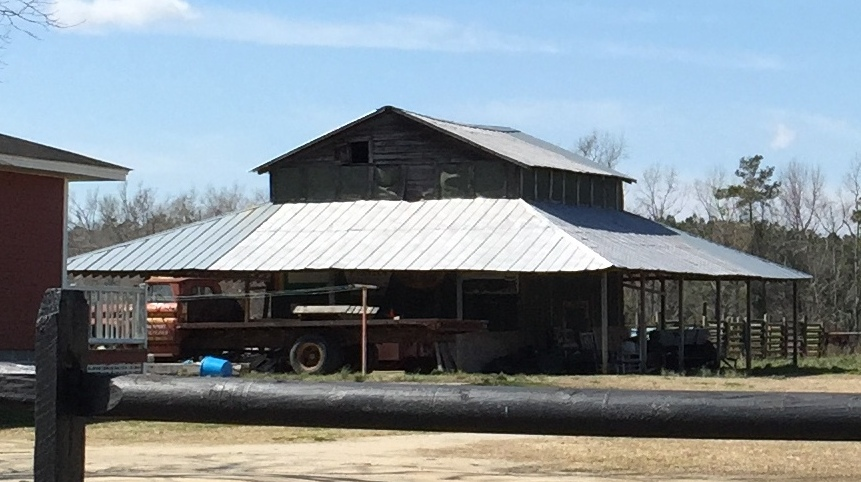

- Location within South Carolina Location within the United States
- Location: 719 Virginia Dr., near Mullins, South Carolina
- Coordinates: 34°10′4″N 79°14′9″W
- Area: less than one acre
- Built: 1894-1895
- Built by: Dillard, John H.
- Architectural style: Log Tobacco Barn
- MPS: Flue-Cured Tobacco Production Properties TR
- NRHP reference No.: 05001101
- Added to NRHP: September 28, 2005

Dillard Barn is a historic tobacco barn for curing leaves close to Mullins, Marion County, South Carolina. It was built in about 1894–95, and is a single-pen plan, log barn supported by a brick foundation with a dirt floor. It was used for curing tobacco from its construction until 1981.

It was listed in the National Register of Historic Places in 2005.
