= Dew House (Nelsonville, Ohio) =

- U.S. National Register of Historic Places
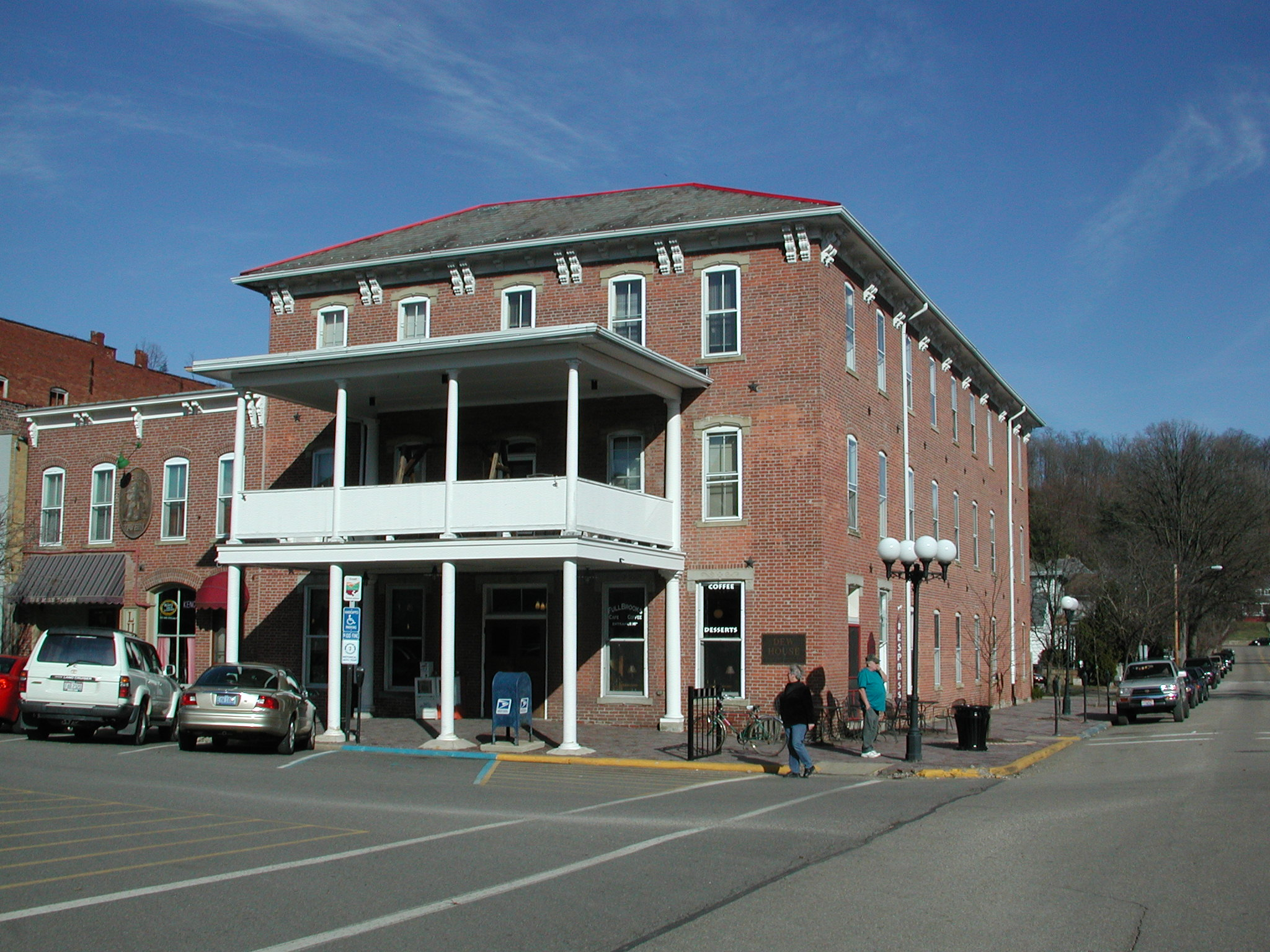

- Location within Ohio
- Location: 6 Public Square, Nelsonville, OH 45764
- Coordinates: 39.460163°N 82.232132°W
- Area: less than one acre
- Built: 1839
- NRHP reference No.: 78002006
- Added to NRHP: October 2, 1978

The Dew House (also known historically as the Ohio House and the Hotel Dew) is a three-story brick hotel building located on the Public Square in Nelsonville, Athens County, Ohio. Constructed originally in 1839 and expanded significantly in 1878, the building played a central role in the economic, social, and political history of Nelsonville during the 19th and early 20th centuries. The property was added to the National Register of Historic Places on October 3, 1978.

== History ==
=== Origins as the Ohio House (1839–1878) ===
The Dew House traces its origins to the Ohio House, a two-story brick hotel built in 1839 by Thomas Dew, an early Nelsonville resident. Built on the corner lots, 24 and 25, Dew purchased in 1835, the hotel featured a full sandstone basement and served travelers arriving via the recently completed Hocking Canal. Differences in wall thickness indicate that much of the original 1839 construction was incorporated into the later hotel structure.

The extension of the canal to Nelsonville in 1840 provided vital transportation infrastructure for the region and was key to the early development of area coal mining. The Ohio House quickly became an important commercial and social hub for the growing town.

=== Expansion and construction of the Dew House (1878) ===
Nelsonville experienced rapid economic expansion following the completion of the Columbus and Hocking Valley Railroad in 1872, which greatly accelerated local coal extraction and spurred population growth. In response to this boom, James Dew, nephew of Thomas Dew, expanded the hotel in 1878 and renamed it the Dew House.

The new three-story structure incorporated the earlier Ohio House and added a seven-bay rear extension along with a two-story, four-bay commercial block on the northeastern side. The building’s roof featured slate covering and a bracketed cornice typical of late 19th-century commercial architecture.

=== Political and social importance ===
During the late 19th and early 20th centuries, the Dew House served as a focal point for community and political life. It functioned as a recruitment office during the Civil War and was home to the first telephone installed in the area.

The hotel became a notable venue for political speeches during major election campaigns. Presidents William McKinley, William Howard Taft, Theodore Roosevelt, and Warren G. Harding all visited the Dew House. In 1912, Roosevelt and Taft both delivered campaign speeches from the hotel’s front porch during their contentious Republican primary contest. The two-story porch seen on the building today was added between 1907 and 1912.

== Decline and closure ==
As coal mining declined in southeastern Ohio, Nelsonville’s growth slowed and the importance of the Dew House diminished. The building transitioned gradually from a hotel to a rooming house and later to welfare housing.

By 1975, the structure no longer met fire code requirements and was officially closed.

== Restoration efforts ==
In the 1970s, the Athens County Commissioners pursued rehabilitation of the Dew House as part of a local revitalization initiative. In May 1978, the building was determined eligible for the National Register of Historic Places. Funding was secured through the U.S. Department of Housing and Urban Development (HUD) to adapt the building for use as housing for elderly residents of moderate income.

The renovation aimed to preserve the historic character of the building while converting it into apartments. The Dew House was formally transferred to the Athens County Metropolitan Housing Authority following restoration.

== Architecture ==
The Dew House is characterized by:

- Three-story brick construction with a U-shaped plan and interior courtyard
- Slate-covered hipped roof with a bracketed cornice
- Segmental-arched windows with 2-over-2 sash
- Star-patterned lintels over the original first-floor windows and entrance
- A two-story wooden and steel porch added between 1907 and 1912

The architectural evolution of the building reflects the economic expansion of Nelsonville during the canal and railroad eras.

== National Register of Historic Places ==
- Added: October 3, 1978
- Reference Area: Lots 24 and 25 of the original Nelsonville plat
- Significance: Local; for politics/government, economics, and social/humanitarian history
