= Marion Historic District (Marion, South Carolina) =

Historic district in South Carolina, United States

- U.S. National Register of Historic Places
- U.S. Historic district
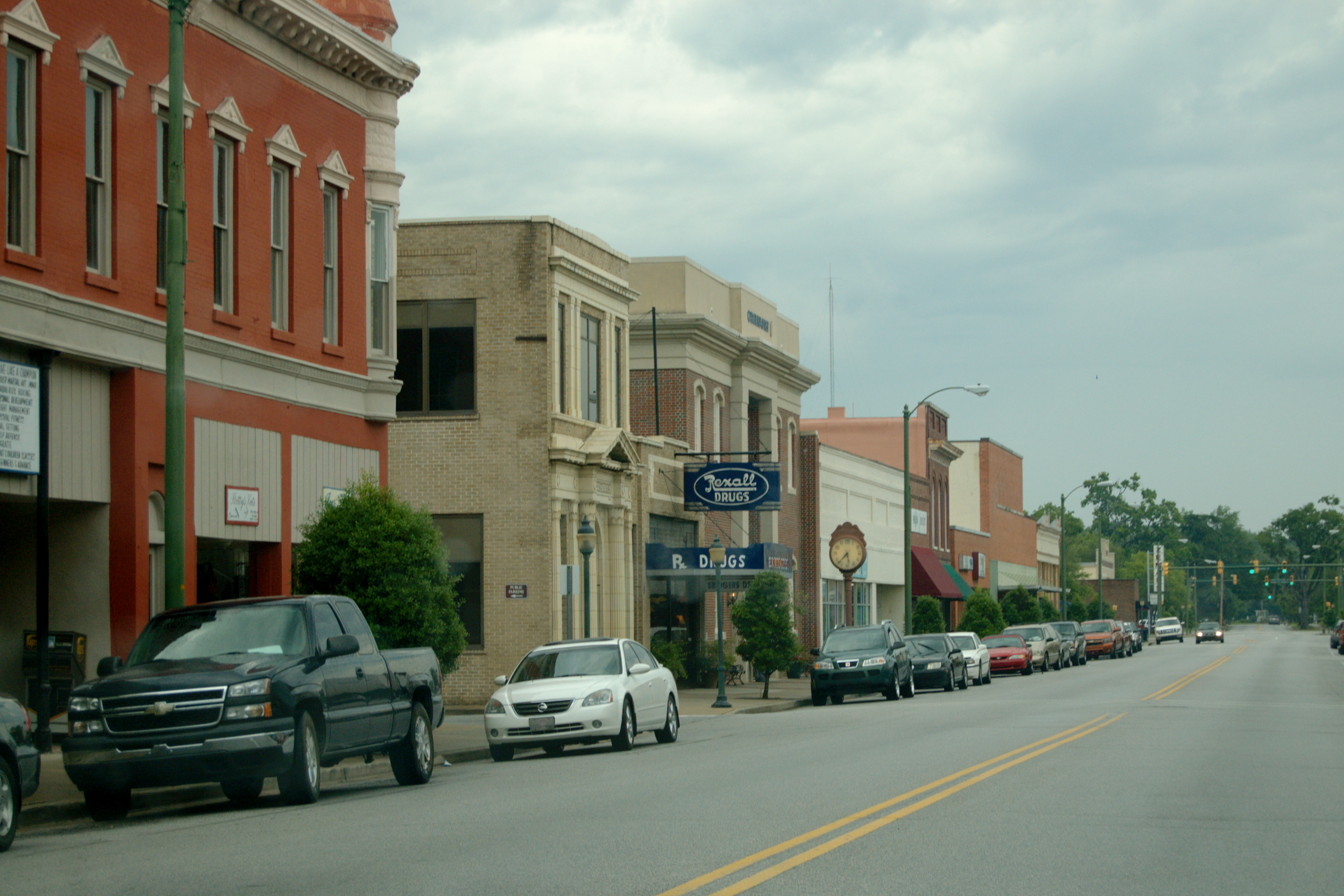

- Location within South Carolina Location within the United States
- Location: Roughly bounded by E. and W. Dozier, N. Montgomery, W. Baptist, and N. Wilcox Sts. (original), Roughly bounded by Railroad and N. Wilcox Aves., N. Main and W. Dozier Sts., also Wheeler, Lee and Arch Sts. (increase), Marion, South Carolina
- Coordinates: 34°10′40″N 79°23′53″W
- Area: 115 acres (47 ha)
- Built: 1800 (original) and 1880 (increase)
- Architectural style: Greek Revival (original) and Classical Revival, Late Victorian, Queen Anne (increase)
- NRHP reference No.: 73001720 (original); 79003320 (increase)

Significant dates
- Added to NRHP: October 4, 1973
- Boundary increase: April 20, 1979

Marion Historic District is in Marion, South Carolina and dates from 1800. It was listed on the National Register of Historic Places in 1973 and its boundaries were increased in 1979.

== Notable sites and properties ==
- Mound Bayou Cemetery (c. 1830–1886)
- Masonic Hall (1822), 203 East Godbold Street
- Major Ferdinand Gibson House (c. 1840), 201 Presbyterian Street
- Young–Johnson House (c. 1850), 502 East Godbold Street
- Methodist District Parsonage (1850s) 109 West Baptist Street
- Marion Presbyterian Church (1852), 208 South Main Street
- Church of the Advent (1880), 307 South Main Street
- Marion Academy (1886), 101 Willcox Avenue
- Opera House and Town Hall (1892), 109 West Godbold Street
- The Grove (1893), 408 Harlee Street; also called W. J. Montgomery House, former home of William J. Montgomery, a local politician and his family including daughter Mabel Montgomery
- Smith Brothers Funeral Home (c. 1895), 507 Willcox Avenue
- Marion Public Library (1905), 101 East Court Street
- Palmetto State Savings & Loan (1916), 618 North Main Street
- Marion Theater (1924), 313 North Main Street
