= Old Brick Warehouse =

- U.S. National Register of Historic Places
- U.S. Historic district – Contributing property
- Location within South Carolina Location within the United States
- Location: Main and Wine Sts., Mullins, South Carolina
- Coordinates: 34°12′24″N 79°15′20″W
- Area: 2.4 acres (0.97 ha)
- Built: 1903-1908
- MPS: Flue-Cured Tobacco Production Properties TR
- NRHP reference No.: 84003828
- Added to NRHP: August 3, 1984

Old Brick Warehouse was an historic tobacco warehouse located at Mullins, Marion County, South Carolina. It was built between 1903 and 1908, and is a 1 1/2 story, brick building with stepped parapets. The original portion of the building has a slightly gabled roof. A 1960s addition had a flat built-up roof. All elevations contain loading and drive-in bays. It is believed to be the first brick tobacco warehouse in Mullins.

It was listed on the National Register of Historic Places in 1984. It was located in the Mullins Commercial Historic District. Demolition on the structure began on July 31, 2014.

== See also ==
- Neal and Dixon's Warehouse: Another historic tobacco warehouse in Mullins
