= Rasor and Clardy Company Building =

- U.S. National Register of Historic Places
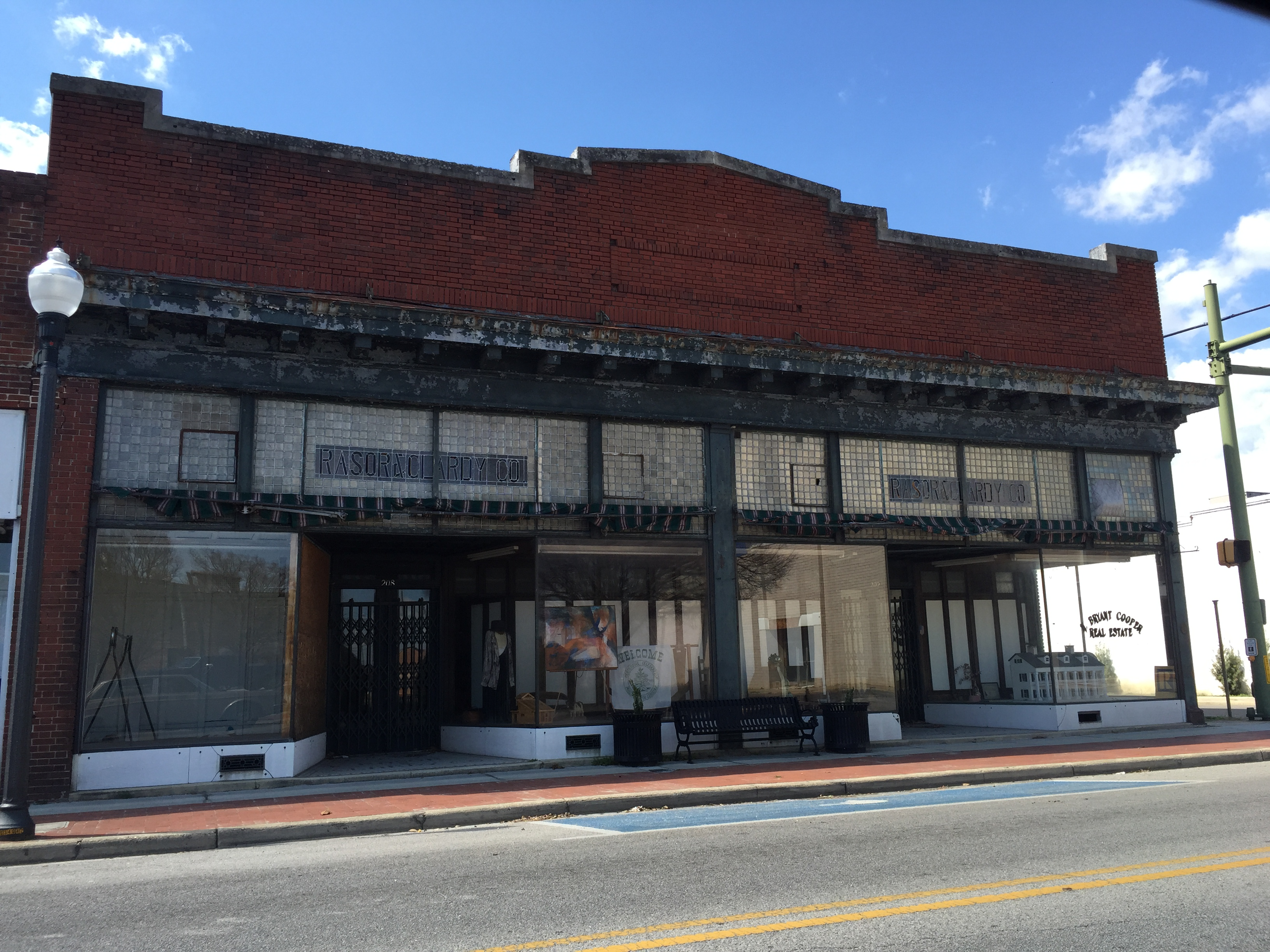

- Location within South Carolina Location within the United States
- Location: 202 S. Main St., Mullins, South Carolina
- Coordinates: 34°12′13″N 79°15′15″W
- Area: 0.2 acres (0.081 ha)
- Built: 1914
- Architectural style: Early Commercial
- NRHP reference No.: 82001522
- Added to NRHP: October 29, 1982

The Rasor and Clardy Company Building is a historic two-story, brick commercial building located in Mullins, Marion County, South Carolina. Now considered the most intact early-20th century commercial edifice remaining in Mullins, the structure, originally used as a jail, was converted into a mercantile in 1914.

The building features metalwork, stained glass, and glass tile; mosaic tiles at the entranceways; wooden coffered ceilings in the display windows; and pressed metal interior cornices and ceilings. It was listed on the National Register of Historic Places in 1982.
