= Mullins Commercial Historic District =

Historic district in South Carolina, United States

- U.S. National Register of Historic Places
- U.S. Historic district
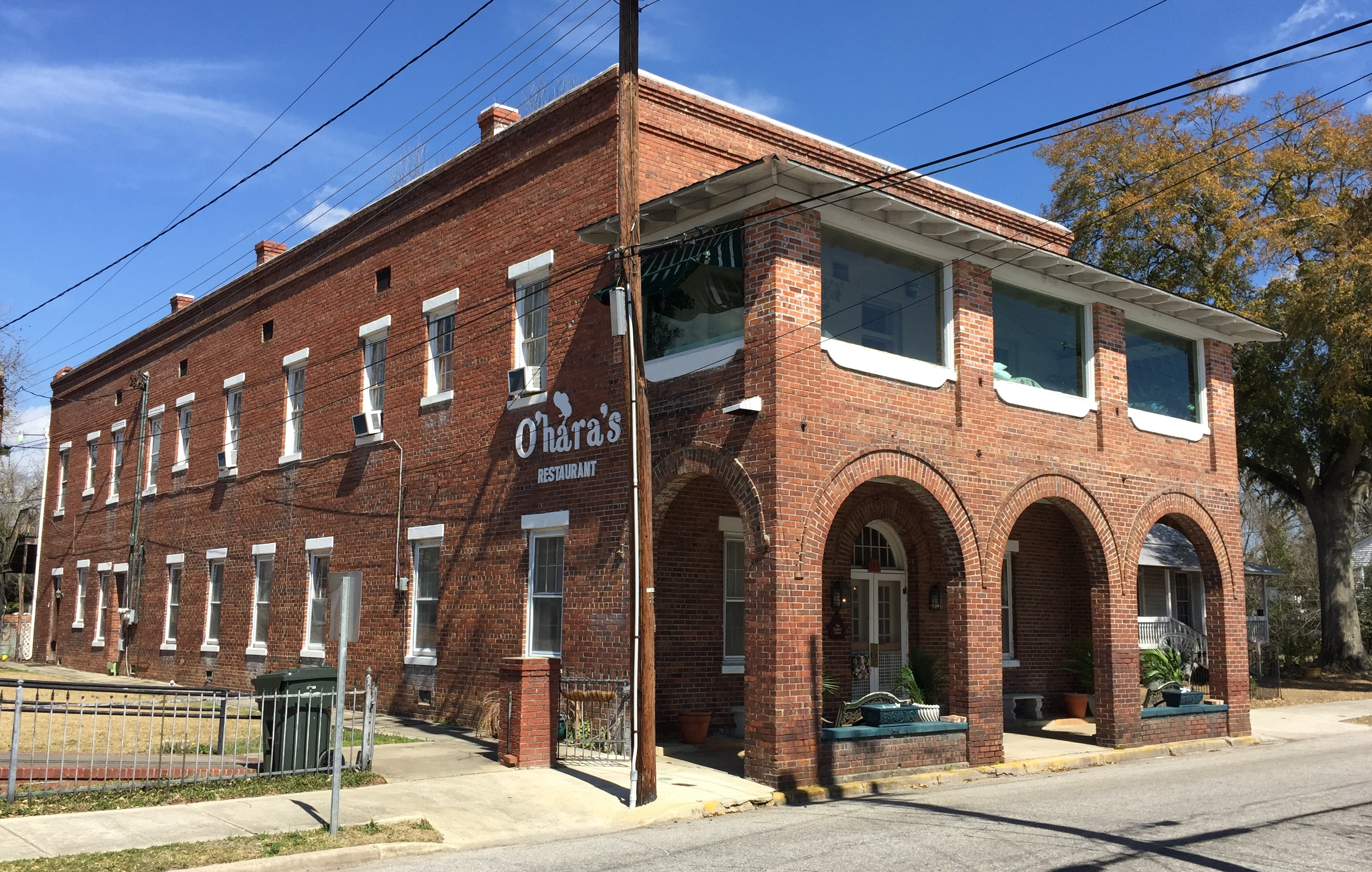

- Location within South Carolina Location within the United States
- Location: Along portions of Main, Front, and W. Wine Sts., Mullins, South Carolina
- Coordinates: 34°12′13″N 79°15′20″W
- Area: 12.6 acres (5.1 ha)
- Architectural style: Classical Revival, Late Victorian, et al/
- NRHP reference No.: 03000662
- Added to NRHP: July 20, 2003

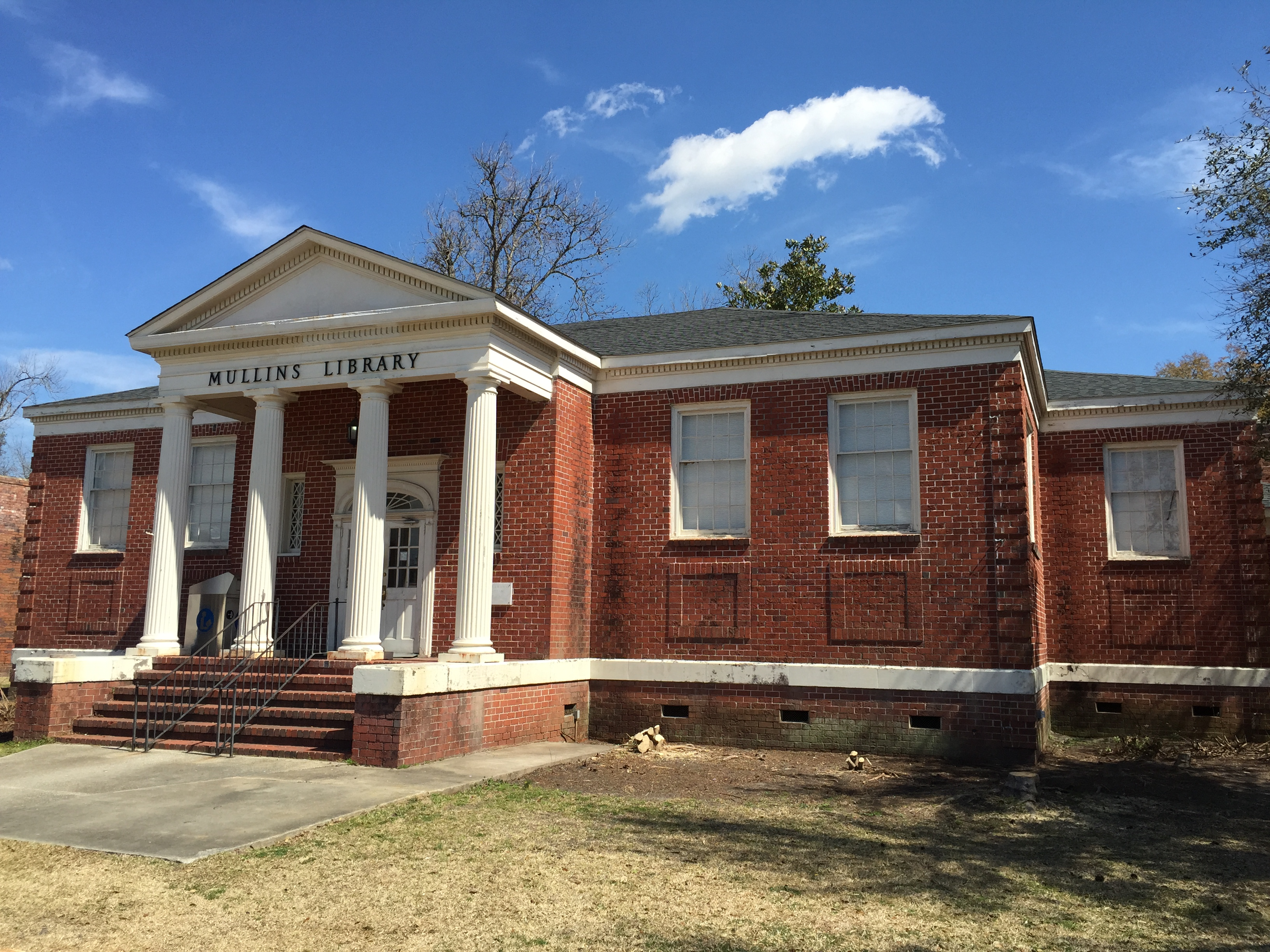
The Mullins Public Library, 210 N. Main, Mullins, South Carolina was designed by George C. Creighton, Jr. and built in 1941.

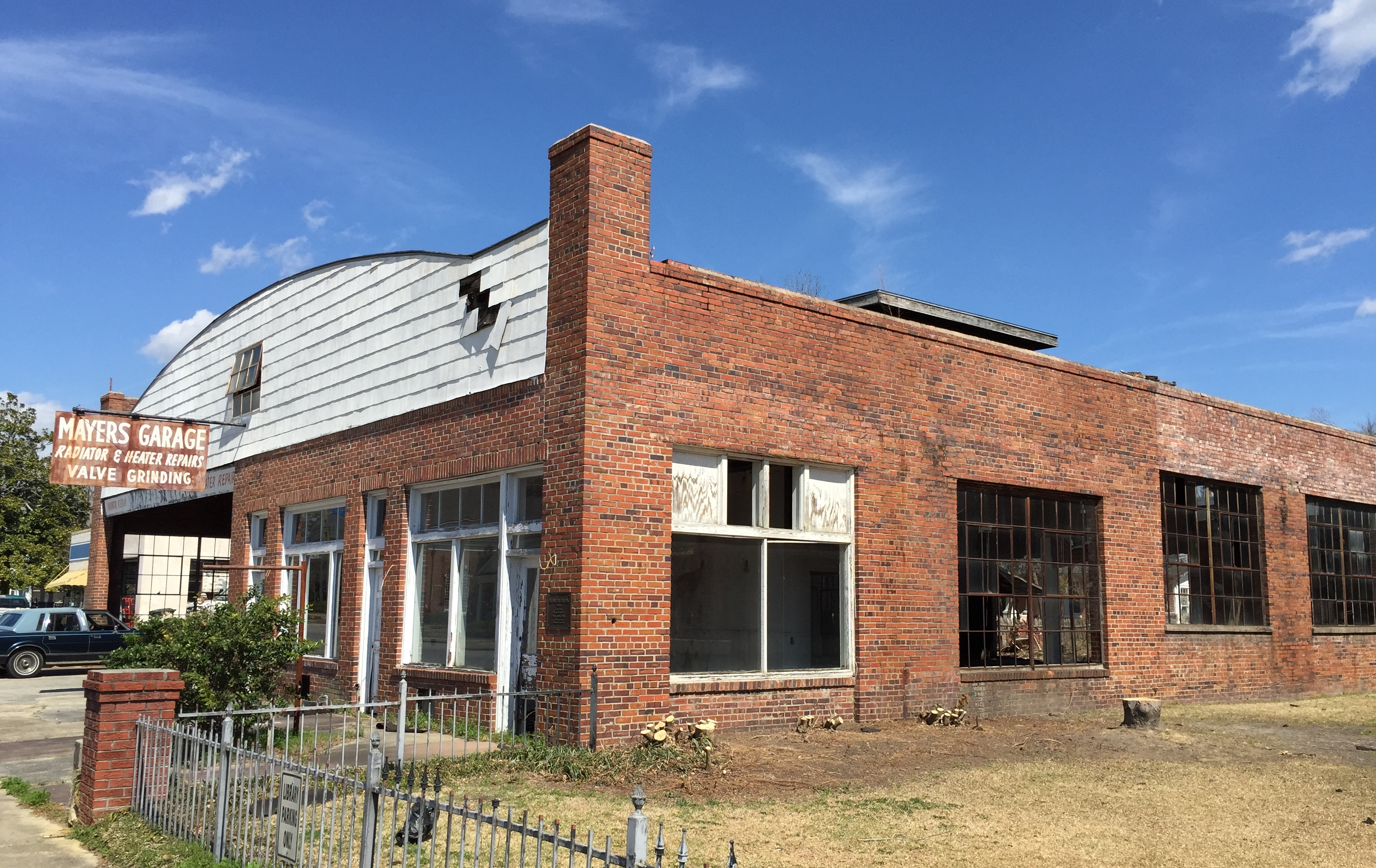
Mayer's Garage, 220 N. Main, Mullins, South Carolina, is a vacant but contributing structure to the Mullins Commercial Historic District.

Mullins Commercial Historic District is a national historic district located at Mullins, Marion County, South Carolina. The district encompasses 38 contributing buildings in the central business district of Mullins. It includes an intact collection of late 19th and early 20th century commercial and other public buildings. The buildings illustrate the growth and development of Mullins from its beginnings as a railroad town to its prominence as the leading tobacco market in South Carolina for most of the 20th century. The buildings were constructed between 1895 and about 1945, and represent stylistic influences ranging from late Victorian period examples displaying elaborate brick-corbeled cornices and pediments to the more simplified and minimalist Depression-era examples with typical low relief detailing and vertical piers. Notable buildings include the Old Martin Hospital (1937), Vaughan Hotel (1921), Mullins Library (1941), Old Mullins Post Office (c. 1936), Bank of Mullins / Anderson Brothers Bank (c. 1910), and Mullins Depot (1901). Located in the district are the separately listed Old Brick Warehouse and J.C. Teasley House.

It was listed in the National Register of Historic Places in 2003.
