= Neal and Dixon's Warehouse =

- U.S. National Register of Historic Places
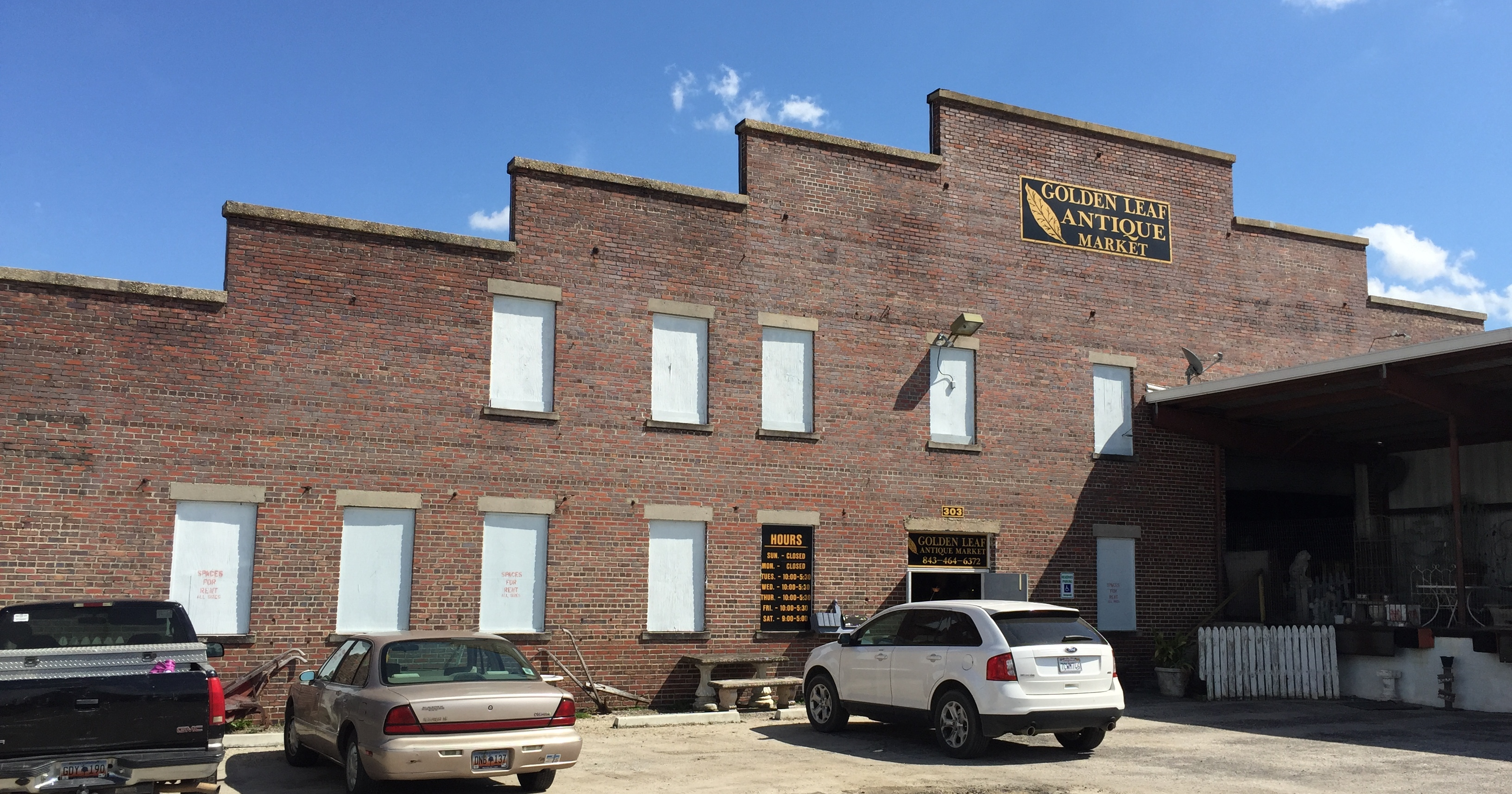
- Neal and Dixon's Warehouse, west facade, 2015

- Location within South Carolina Location within the United States
- Location: 303 S. Main St., Mullins, South Carolina
- Coordinates: 34°12′9″N 79°15′10″W
- Area: 1.9 acres (0.77 ha)
- Built: 1926
- MPS: Flue-Cured Tobacco Production Properties TR
- NRHP reference No.: 84003822
- Added to NRHP: August 3, 1984

Neal and Dixon's Warehouse in Mullins, Marion County, South Carolina, was built circa 1926 for J.S. Neal, C.O. Dixon, and J.H. Dixon Sr. The virtually unaltered warehouse is a typical example of traditional tobacco warehouse construction. It is also important in the history of tobacco marketing in the area. At the time of its construction Neal and Dixon's Warehouse was said to be one of the largest and most modern warehouses in South Carolina. In the 1926 season, the warehouse employed over 800 people.

The 1 1/2-story, common bond brick building has a metal-covered gable roof, with a number of skylights. There are stepped parapets on the front and rear elevations. The front windows are six-over-six with concrete lintels and sills. There are eight arched loading bays on the side elevations. Arched drive-throughs are located on the front and rear. The front drive-through was enlarged.

It was listed in the National Register of Historic Places on August 3, 1984. It is currently home to the Golden Leaf Antique Market.

== See also ==
- Old Brick Warehouse: Another historic tobacco warehouse in Mullins
