= Mullins, South Carolina =

- City
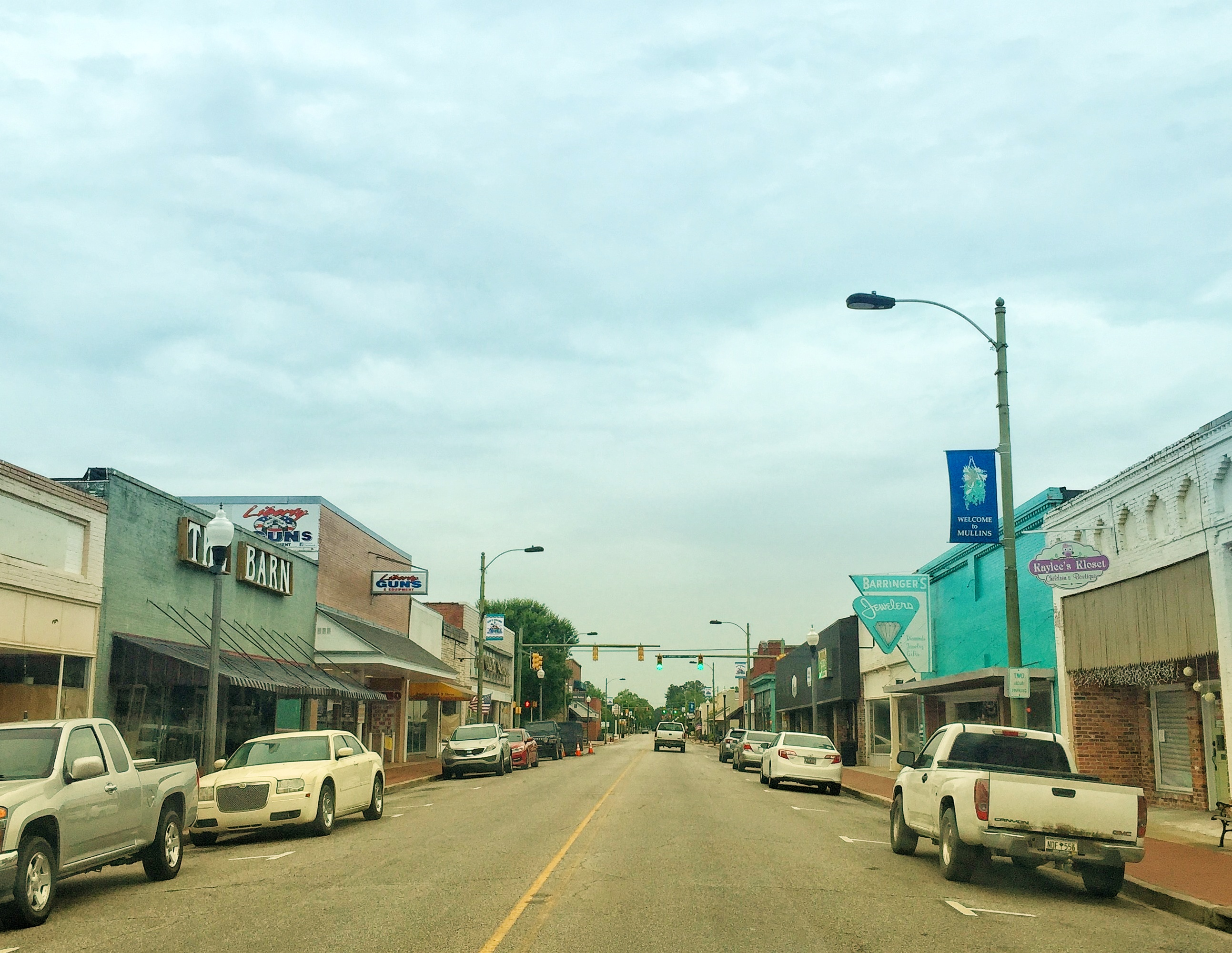
- Downtown Mullins

- Seal
- Nickname: "The City of Opportunity"
- Location within South Carolina
- Coordinates: 34°12′09″N 79°15′03″W
- Country: United States
- State: South Carolina
- County: Marion

Area
  - Total: 3.02 sq mi (7.82 km^{2})
  - Land: 3.02 sq mi (7.82 km^{2})
  - Water: 0 sq mi (0.00 km^{2})
- Elevation: 98 ft (30 m)

Population (2020)
  - Total: 4,026
  - Density: 1,332.6/sq mi (514.52/km^{2})
- Time zone: UTC-5 (EST)
  - Summer (DST): UTC-4 (EDT)
- ZIP code: 29574
- Area codes: 843, 854
- FIPS code: 45-48805
- GNIS feature ID: 2404338
- Website: mullinssc.us

Mullins is a city in Marion County, South Carolina, United States. As of the 2020 census, Mullins had a population of 4,026.

Incorporated on March 4, 1872, Mullins was named after Col. William S. Mullins, who served as a representative for Marion County in the South Carolina State Legislature from 1852 to 1866.

== History ==
On March 4, 1872, the charter was approved for the town of Mullins.The same year the Macedonia Methodist church was established, the first church within city limits. By 1878, the city of Mullins had a population of 75 people, a total of 12 families. There were only three stores and four unpaved streets: Railroad, Main, Smith, and Gapway Streets. Gapway Road was designed from 76 Hwy in 1933.

In 1894, the growth and sale of tobacco sparked the further development of the city of Mullins. At one time, the town was the largest tobacco producing/marketing industry in the United States. Mullins became the largest distributor of tobacco in the country, known as "South Carolina's Largest, The world's best tobacco market." In the late 1920s the tobacco festival was started and is still celebrated today. The tobacco festival is known as the 'Golden Leaf Festival."

Mullins' first school was established in 1872, which was attended by boys and girls from the town, nearby rural areas, and neighboring counties. The first schoolhouse was built in 1904; a brick, two-story building on Academy Street. A second schoolhouse was built in 1913, on the corner of Main and Academy streets. Mullins High School was built in 1923 on North Park Street where it stood until burning in 1976. It was rebuilt close to the old Marion highway, outside of the city limits. McCormick Elementary School was built on Sandy Bluff Road in 1956. The original Palmetto School for Negroes (High and Elementary) was built on Cypress Street in 1919 and around 1956 was split up. The Palmetto Elementary School was built on Broad Street. The Palmetto High School was built on O'Neal Street with 1970 being the last graduating class. It became Palmetto Middle School as it remains today. In 1970 all schools were combined into a fully integrated school system.

In 1910, the public library was established. The current library, located at the corner of N. Main and Wine Streets, was built in 1940.

The A.H. Buchan Company Building, Dillard Barn, Imperial Tobacco Company Building, Liberty Warehouse, Mt. Olive Baptist Church, Mullins Commercial Historic District, Neal and Dixon's Warehouse, Old Brick Warehouse, Rasor and Clardy Company Building, and J.C. Teasley House are listed on the National Register of Historic Places.

== Geography ==
According to the United States Census Bureau, the city has a total area of 3.0 square miles (7.8 km^{2}), all land.

== Demographics ==
Historical population
Census	Pop.	Note	%±
1890	242		—
1900	828		242.1%
1910	1,832		121.3%
1920	2,379		29.9%
1930	3,158		32.7%
1940	4,392		39.1%
1950	4,916		11.9%
1960	6,229		26.7%
1970	6,006		−3.6%
1980	6,068		1.0%
1990	5,910		−2.6%
2000	5,029		−14.9%
2010	4,663		−7.3%
2020	4,026		−13.7%
U.S. Decennial Census

=== Racial and ethnic composition ===
Racial composition as of the 2020 census
Race	Number	Percent
White	1,079	26.8%
Black or African American	2,750	68.3%
American Indian and Alaska Native	19	0.5%
Asian	26	0.6%
Native Hawaiian and Other Pacific Islander	0	0.0%
Some other race	37	0.9%
Two or more races	115	2.9%
Hispanic or Latino (of any race)	66	1.6%

=== 2020 Census ===
As of the 2020 census, Mullins had a population of 4,026, 1,762 households, and 930 families residing in the city.

The median age was 43.8 years. 23.0% of residents were under the age of 18 and 22.9% of residents were 65 years of age or older. For every 100 females there were 76.3 males, and for every 100 females age 18 and over there were 71.3 males age 18 and over.

99.0% of residents lived in urban areas, while 1.0% lived in rural areas.

There were 1,762 households in Mullins, of which 29.6% had children under the age of 18 living in them. Of all households, 23.3% were married-couple households, 21.2% were households with a male householder and no spouse or partner present, and 50.8% were households with a female householder and no spouse or partner present. About 34.9% of all households were made up of individuals and 17.3% had someone living alone who was 65 years of age or older.

There were 2,067 housing units, of which 14.8% were vacant. The homeowner vacancy rate was 2.0% and the rental vacancy rate was 10.2%.

=== 2000 Census ===
As of the census of 2000, there were 5,029 people, 2,001 households, and 1,324 families residing in the city. The population density was 1,647.8 inhabitants per square mile (636.2/km^{2}). There were 2,312 housing units at an average density of 757.6 per square mile (292.5/km^{2}). The racial makeup of the city was 61.58% African American, 36.59% White, 0.28% Native American, 0.68% Asian, 0.12% from other races, and 0.76% from two or more races. Hispanic or Latino of any race were 0.93% of the population.

There were 2,001 households, out of which 29.3% had children under the age of 18 living with them, 33.1% were married living together, 29.1% had a female householder with no husband present, and 33.8% were non-families. 31.1% of all households were made up of individuals, and 14.5% had someone living alone who was 65 years of age or older. The average household size was 2.46 and the average family size was 3.08.

In the city, the population was spread out, with 27.6% under the age of 18, 8.8% from 18 to 24, 23.5% from 25 to 44, 23.2% from 45 to 64, and 16.9% who were 65 years of age or older. The median age was 38 years. For every 100 females, there were 73.2 males. For every 100 females age 18 and over, there were 65.5 males.

The median income for a household in the city was $20,154, and the median income for a family was $25,218. Males had a median income of $26,233 versus $16,572 for females. The per capita income for the city was $12,183. About 25.3% of families and 28.7% of the population were below the poverty line, including 44.2% of those under age 18 and 20.0% of those age 65 or over.

== Government ==
The city is run by an elected council-mayor government system.

== Education ==
Mullins has a public library, a branch of the Marion County Library System.

== Notable people ==
- Terrell Grice, producer, singer-songwriter, and YouTuber
- Xavier Legette, NFL wide receiver for the Carolina Panthers
- Edgar L. McGowan, commissioner of South Carolina Department of Labor
- Joseph O. Rogers Jr., member of the South Carolina House of Representatives
