= Marion, South Carolina =

- City
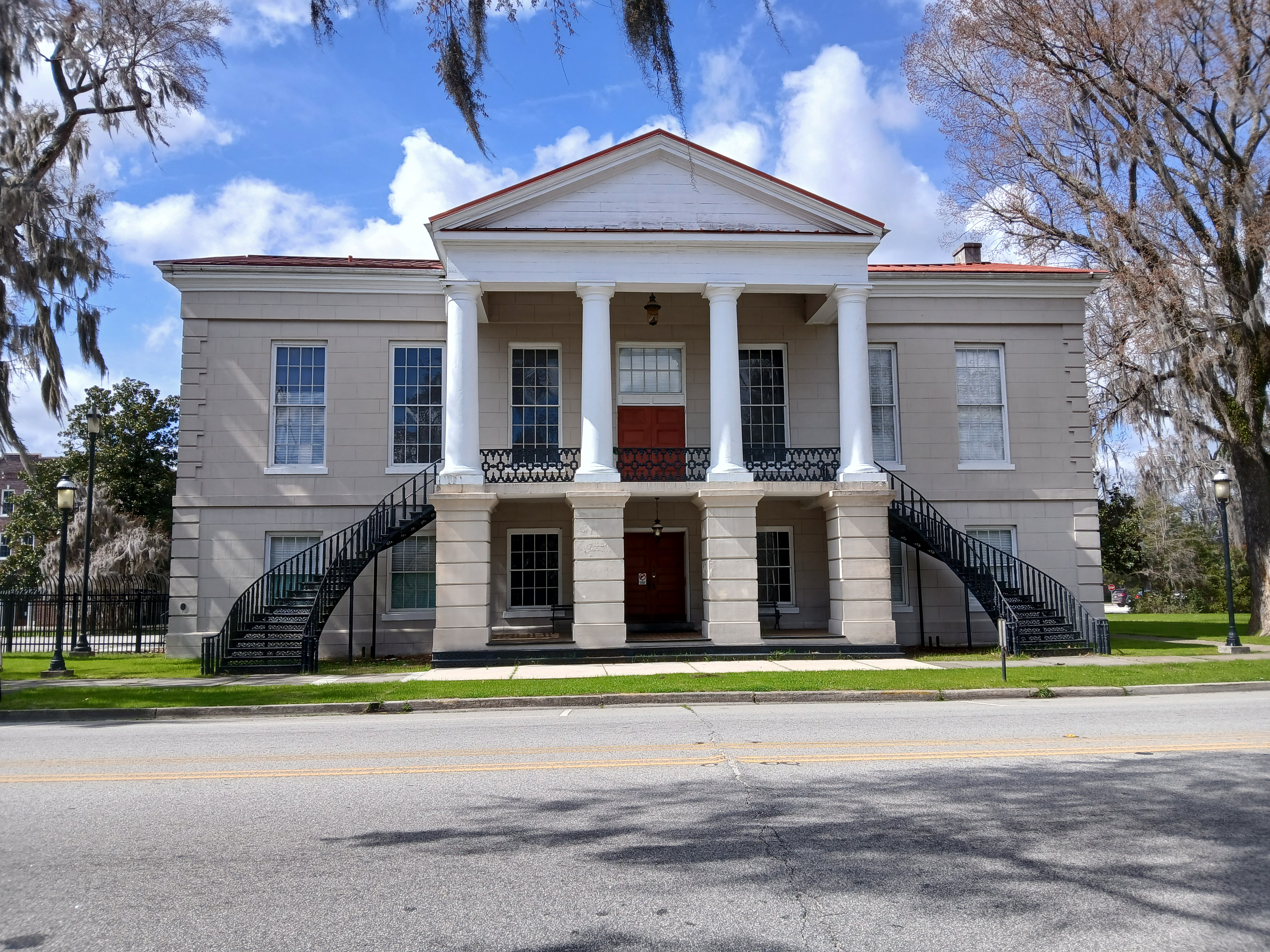
- Marion County Courthouse

- Flag Seal
- Nickname: "The Swamp Fox City"
- Motto(s): "Where History and Hospitality Greets You"
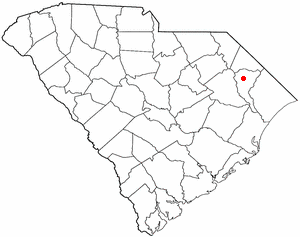
- Location of Marion in South Carolina
- Coordinates: 34°10′52″N 79°22′50″W
- Country: United States
- State: South Carolina
- County: Marion
- Established: 1795

Area
  - Total: 4.47 sq mi (11.59 km^{2})
  - Land: 4.47 sq mi (11.59 km^{2})
  - Water: 0 sq mi (0.00 km^{2})
- Elevation: 69 ft (21 m)

Population (2020)
  - Total: 6,448
  - Density: 1,440.3/sq mi (556.11/km^{2})
- Time zone: UTC−5 (EST)
  - Summer (DST): UTC−4 (EDT)
- ZIP code: 29571
- Area codes: 843, 854
- FIPS code: 45-44575
- GNIS feature ID: 2405023
- Website: www.marionsc.gov

Marion is a city in and the county seat of Marion County, South Carolina, United States. It is named for Francis Marion, a brigadier general from South Carolina in the American Revolutionary War. As of the 2020 census, Marion had a population of 6,448.

== History ==
The Marion High School, Marion County Court House, Marion County Library, Marion County Museum and Marion Historic District are listed on the National Register of Historic Places.

Some sixty years after the first permanent settlement in South Carolina, a group of English settlers sent out by the Lords Proprietor landed in Georgetown and moved up the Pee Dee River to the junction of the Little Pee Dee River about halfway between Georgetown and the present town of Marion. Among these families were Brittons, Davis, Flaglers, Giles, Graves and Tyler. At about the same time, and possibly on the same ship from England, came Captain John Godbold, a retired English sea captain. He moved farther up the Big Pee Dee and settled on Catfish Creek. The creek is southwest of and very near to the present city limits of Marion.

During its early colonial years the area was part of Craven County. When Craven was divided, this segment of land was placed in Georgetown District and was known as Gilesboro after Colonel Hugh Giles, an American Revolutionary war hero who fought under Francis Marion. In 1785, another division was made and the name "Liberty" was used for a short time to designate this area.

On December 17, 1847, when by an act of the South Carolina Legislature a charter was issued to the town, its official name was given as "Marion". The name honors General Francis Marion, a hero of the Revolutionary War.

=== Court House ===
A commission was appointed by the South Carolina Legislature to locate the site for a court house. Court was scheduled for the first Monday in March 1800. The court house was not complete, so it was held in a log building on Colonel Hugh Giles' plantation about two miles below Marion. The section was called Gilesboro or Gilesboro Court House for some time after. The Commissioners appointed to select the site for the Court House were offered land by several land owners in the vicinity, including Giles, but they chose and accepted four acres from Thomas Godbold, a grandson of Captain John Godbold. The present Court House was erected in 1854 and is the third Court House on or near the same site.

During the Revolutionary War, the people of Marion County were divided in their loyalties. There were ardent Patriots under Col. Hugh Giles, Capt. John Dozier, Capt. Stephen Godbold and others. Maj. Micajah Ganey and Capt. Jessee Barfield led the Loyalists. Before the end of the war, most of the Loyalists had pledged allegiance to the colonists due to the activities of General Francis Marion in the area. The Revolutionary battles in the county were Port's Ferry, Blue Savannah and Bowling Green.

During the American Civil War, Marion County was spared damage from Sherman's troops due to the Big Pee Dee River being at flood stage. The troops were unable to cross the river. The county fully participated in the reconstruction, and in 1876 there were Red Shirt organizations in every township.

=== Railroad ===
Marion County had several periods of growth. With the building and completion of the Wilmington to Manchester Railroad in 1854, business and transportation improved. Gen. W.W. Harllee was the first president of the railroad; the town of Florence, to the west of Marion, was named for his daughter. The second president was Col. William S. Mullins, for whom the town of Mullins was named.

=== Separation ===
In 1888, a part of the west side of the county was separated to form Florence County, and in 1910 the upper part of the county was separated to form Dillon County.

== Geography ==
According to the United States Census Bureau, the city has a total area of 4.3 square miles (11 km^{2}), all of it land.

=== Climate ===
Climate data for Marion, South Carolina (1991–2020 normals, extremes 1893, 1898, 1927–1994, 2006–present)
| Month | Jan | Feb | Mar | Apr | May | Jun | Jul | Aug | Sep | Oct | Nov | Dec | Year |
|---|---|---|---|---|---|---|---|---|---|---|---|---|---|
| Record high °F (°C) | 84 (29) | 85 (29) | 93 (34) | 96 (36) | 101 (38) | 108 (42) | 108 (42) | 106 (41) | 102 (39) | 101 (38) | 88 (31) | 83 (28) | 108 (42) |
| Mean daily maximum °F (°C) | 56.1 (13.4) | 59.8 (15.4) | 66.9 (19.4) | 75.4 (24.1) | 82.1 (27.8) | 87.6 (30.9) | 90.5 (32.5) | 88.9 (31.6) | 84.2 (29.0) | 75.8 (24.3) | 66.1 (18.9) | 59.4 (15.2) | 74.4 (23.6) |
| Daily mean °F (°C) | 45.0 (7.2) | 48.1 (8.9) | 54.6 (12.6) | 62.3 (16.8) | 70.5 (21.4) | 77.5 (25.3) | 80.8 (27.1) | 79.3 (26.3) | 74.0 (23.3) | 63.7 (17.6) | 54.2 (12.3) | 48.0 (8.9) | 63.2 (17.3) |
| Mean daily minimum °F (°C) | 33.9 (1.1) | 36.5 (2.5) | 42.4 (5.8) | 49.3 (9.6) | 59.0 (15.0) | 67.4 (19.7) | 71.0 (21.7) | 69.6 (20.9) | 63.8 (17.7) | 51.6 (10.9) | 42.2 (5.7) | 36.6 (2.6) | 51.9 (11.1) |
| Record low °F (°C) | 0 (−18) | 11 (−12) | 10 (−12) | 24 (−4) | 31 (−1) | 42 (6) | 49 (9) | 46 (8) | 39 (4) | 22 (−6) | 15 (−9) | 0 (−18) | 0 (−18) |
| Average precipitation inches (mm) | 3.51 (89) | 3.22 (82) | 3.51 (89) | 3.43 (87) | 3.62 (92) | 4.96 (126) | 5.23 (133) | 5.54 (141) | 5.97 (152) | 3.26 (83) | 3.33 (85) | 3.69 (94) | 49.27 (1,251) |
Source: NOAA

== Demographics ==
Historical population
| Census | Pop. | Note | %± |
|---|---|---|---|
| 1850 | 214 | | — |
| 1870 | 968 | | — |
| 1880 | 824 | | −14.9% |
| 1890 | 1,640 | | 99.0% |
| 1900 | 1,831 | | 11.6% |
| 1910 | 3,844 | | 109.9% |
| 1920 | 3,892 | | 1.2% |
| 1930 | 4,921 | | 26.4% |
| 1940 | 5,746 | | 16.8% |
| 1950 | 6,834 | | 18.9% |
| 1960 | 7,174 | | 5.0% |
| 1970 | 7,435 | | 3.6% |
| 1980 | 7,700 | | 3.6% |
| 1990 | 7,658 | | −0.5% |
| 2000 | 7,042 | | −8.0% |
| 2010 | 6,939 | | −1.5% |
| 2020 | 6,448 | | −7.1% |
U.S. Decennial Census

=== 2020 census ===
As of the 2020 census, Marion had a population of 6,448 people, 2,627 households, and 1,568 families. The median age was 38.2 years; 26.3% of residents were under the age of 18 and 18.8% of residents were 65 years of age or older. For every 100 females there were 80.5 males, and for every 100 females age 18 and over there were 73.2 males age 18 and over.

100.0% of residents lived in urban areas, while 0.0% lived in rural areas.

There were 2,627 households in Marion, of which 34.3% had children under the age of 18 living in them. Of all households, 27.0% were married-couple households, 17.7% were households with a male householder and no spouse or partner present, and 51.2% were households with a female householder and no spouse or partner present. About 31.6% of all households were made up of individuals and 14.7% had someone living alone who was 65 years of age or older.

There were 3,039 housing units, of which 13.6% were vacant. The homeowner vacancy rate was 3.4% and the rental vacancy rate was 7.8%.

Racial composition as of the 2020 census
| Race | Number | Percent |
|---|---|---|
| White | 1,609 | 25.0% |
| Black or African American | 4,524 | 70.2% |
| American Indian and Alaska Native | 20 | 0.3% |
| Asian | 74 | 1.1% |
| Native Hawaiian and Other Pacific Islander | 0 | 0.0% |
| Some other race | 31 | 0.5% |
| Two or more races | 190 | 2.9% |
| Hispanic or Latino (of any race) | 76 | 1.2% |

=== 2000 census ===
At the 2000 census, there were 7,042 people, 2,765 households and 1,913 families residing in the city. The population density was 1,627.5 inhabitants per square mile (628.4/km^{2}). There were 3,081 housing units at an average density of 712.0 per square mile (274.9/km^{2}). The racial makeup of the city was 66.22% African American, 32.14% White, 0.14% Native American, 0.40% Asian, 0.40% from other races, and 0.71% from two or more races. Hispanic or Latino people of any race were 1.02% of the population.

There were 2,765 households, of which 31.5% had children under the age of 18 living with them, 34.9% were married living together, 30.0% had a female householder with no husband present, and 30.8% were non-families. 28.0% of all households were made up of individuals, and 12.7% had someone living alone who was 65 years of age or older. The average household size was 2.54 and the average family size was 3.11.

29.2% of the population were under the age of 18, 9.5% from 18 to 24, 24.9% from 25 to 44, 21.5% from 45 to 64, and 14.9% who were 65 years of age or older. The median age was 35 years. For every 100 females, there were 76.7 males. For every 100 females age 18 and over, there were 69.6 males.

The median household income was $24,265 and the median family income for a family was $31,844. Males had a median income of $26,917 compared with $21,667 for females. The per capita income was $16,551. About 23.1% of families and 27.4% of the population were below the poverty line, including 38.8% of those under age 18 and 24.0% of those age 65 or over.

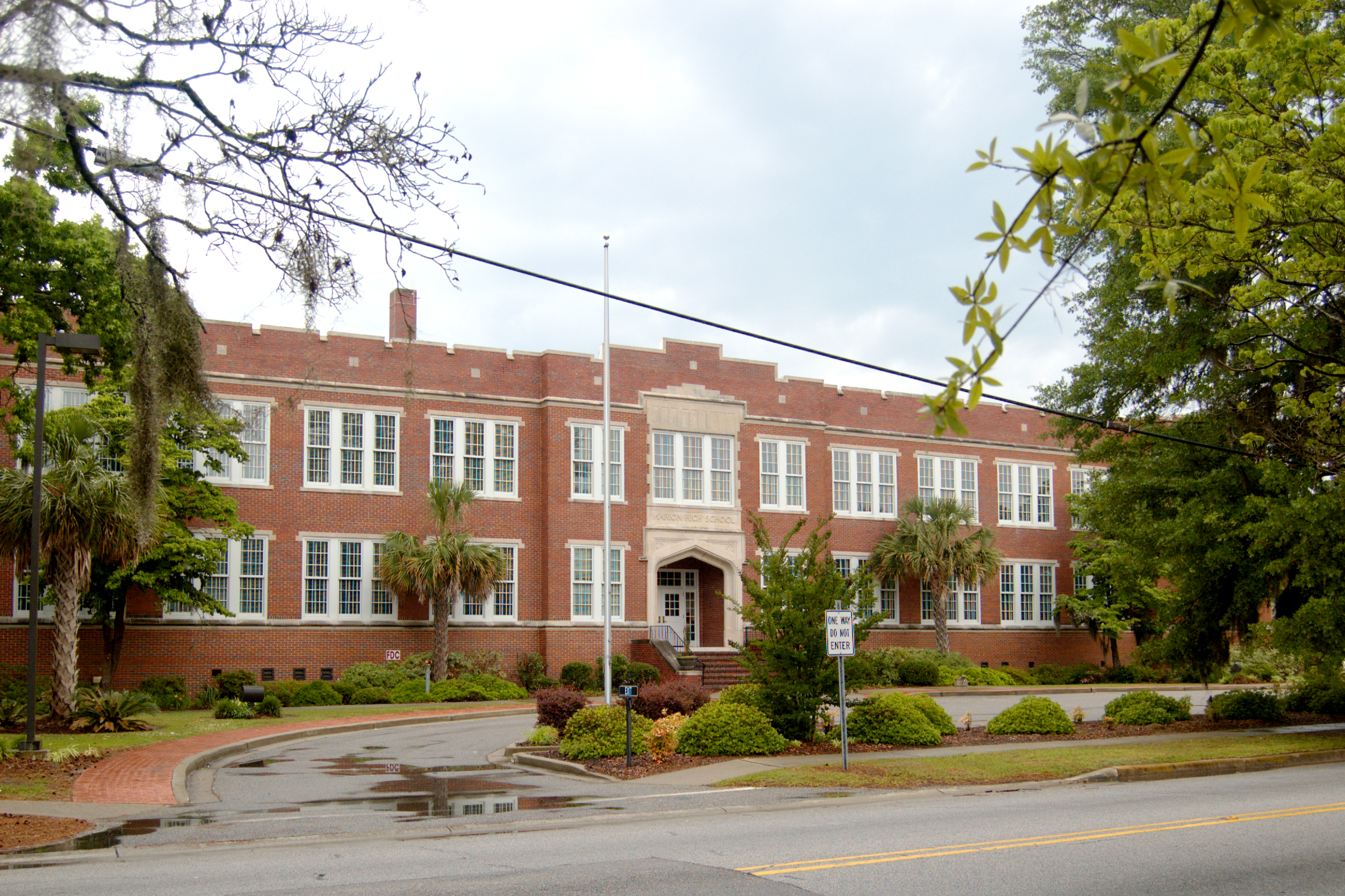
Marion High School (1924–1976)

== Education ==
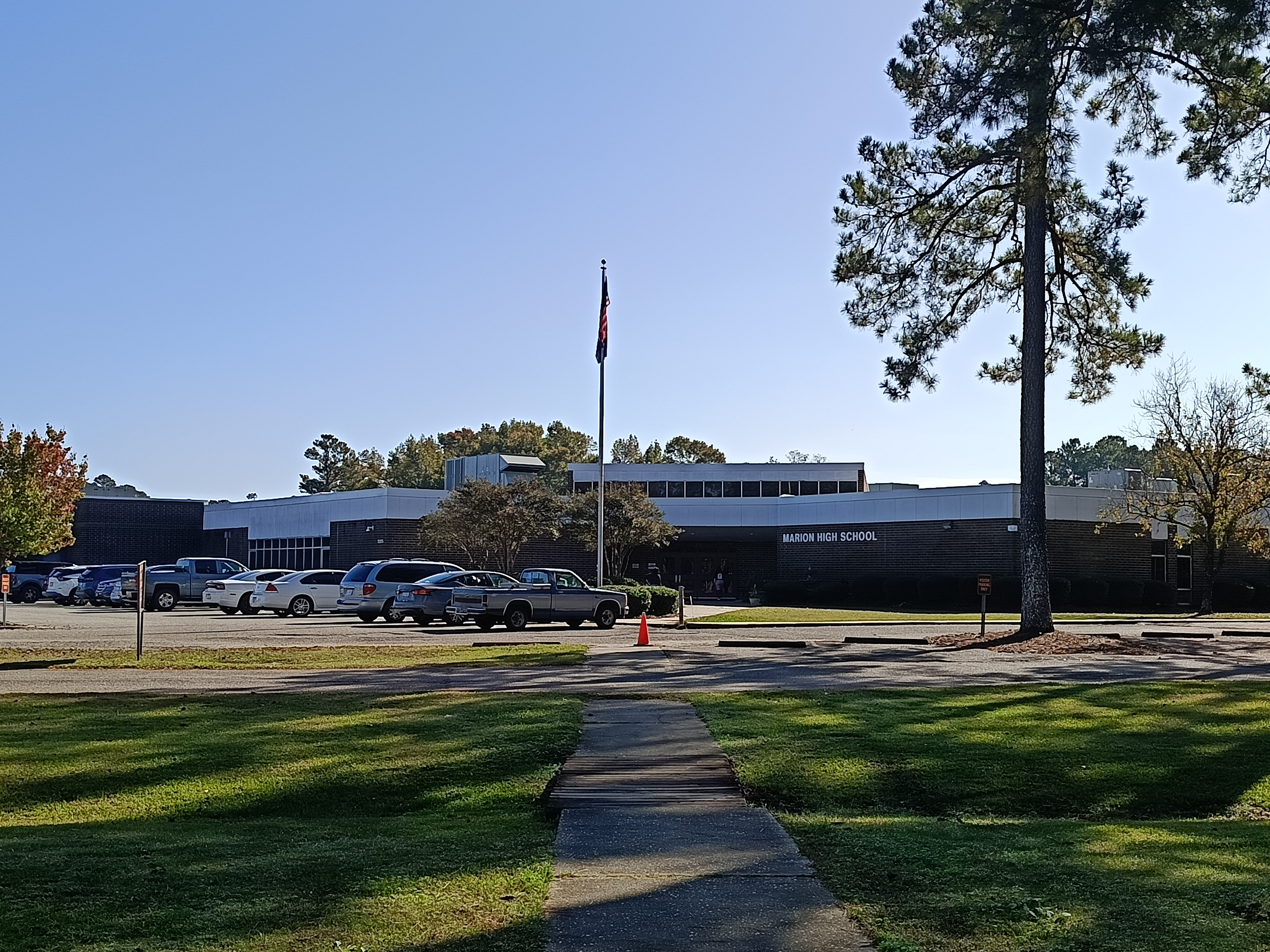
Marion High School (1976- present)

Marion County School District is the governing body of the public schools in the area. The school system supports an alternative school for middle and/or high school students, a vocational career center and an adult learning center.

Pee Dee Academy is a private school.

Marion has a technical center called Academy for Careers and Technology. Nearby higher education institutions include Francis Marion University, Florence–Darlington Technical College, Coker College, and Coastal Carolina University.

Marion has a public library, a branch of the Marion County Library System.

== Neighborhoods ==
- Fox Hollow
- Williams Park
- West Marion
- Rogers Park
- North Main Street
- South Main Street
- Highland
- East Marion

== Notable people ==
- Mabel Montgomery (1879–1968), writer, clubwoman, and photographer
- William J. Montgomery (1851–1913), lawyer, mayor of Marion in 1891, member of the South Carolina House of Representatives and South Carolina Senate
- M. Warley Platzek (1854–1932), lawyer and New York Supreme Court Justice
- Levern Tart, basketball player
- Armstrong Williams, the largest minority owner of broadcast TV stations in the United States

== Transportation ==
=== Airports ===
- Myrtle Beach International Airport (MYR), 43 miles southeast of Marion
- Marion County Airport (MAO)
- Florence Regional Airport (FLO)

== Highways ==
- US 76
- US 501
- SC 576
- SC 41

== Industry ==
- Coca-Cola – A distribution plant
- Marion Industrial Park
- Sunbelt Roofing Service Inc.
- Commercial Glass and Metal, an architectural glass design house and factory
- Normont Motion Technology
- Axynova Industries
