= Dew Barn =

- U.S. National Register of Historic Places
- Location within South Carolina Location within the United States
- Location: NW of Zion, near Zion, South Carolina
- Coordinates: 34°17′4″N 79°21′29″W
- Area: 0.6 acres (0.24 ha)
- MPS: Flue-Cured Tobacco Production Properties TR
- NRHP reference No.: 84003818
- Added to NRHP: August 3, 1984

Dew Barn is a historic tobacco barn for curing leaves located near Zion, Marion County, South Carolina. It was built before 1935, and is a hewn-timber tobacco barn with a steep, metal-covered gable roof, surrounded on all sides by a metal-roofed shed. The barn has an arched brick firebox, which supplied the heat for curing.

It was listed in the National Register of Historic Places in 1984.
