= Marion High School (South Carolina) =

- U.S. National Register of Historic Places
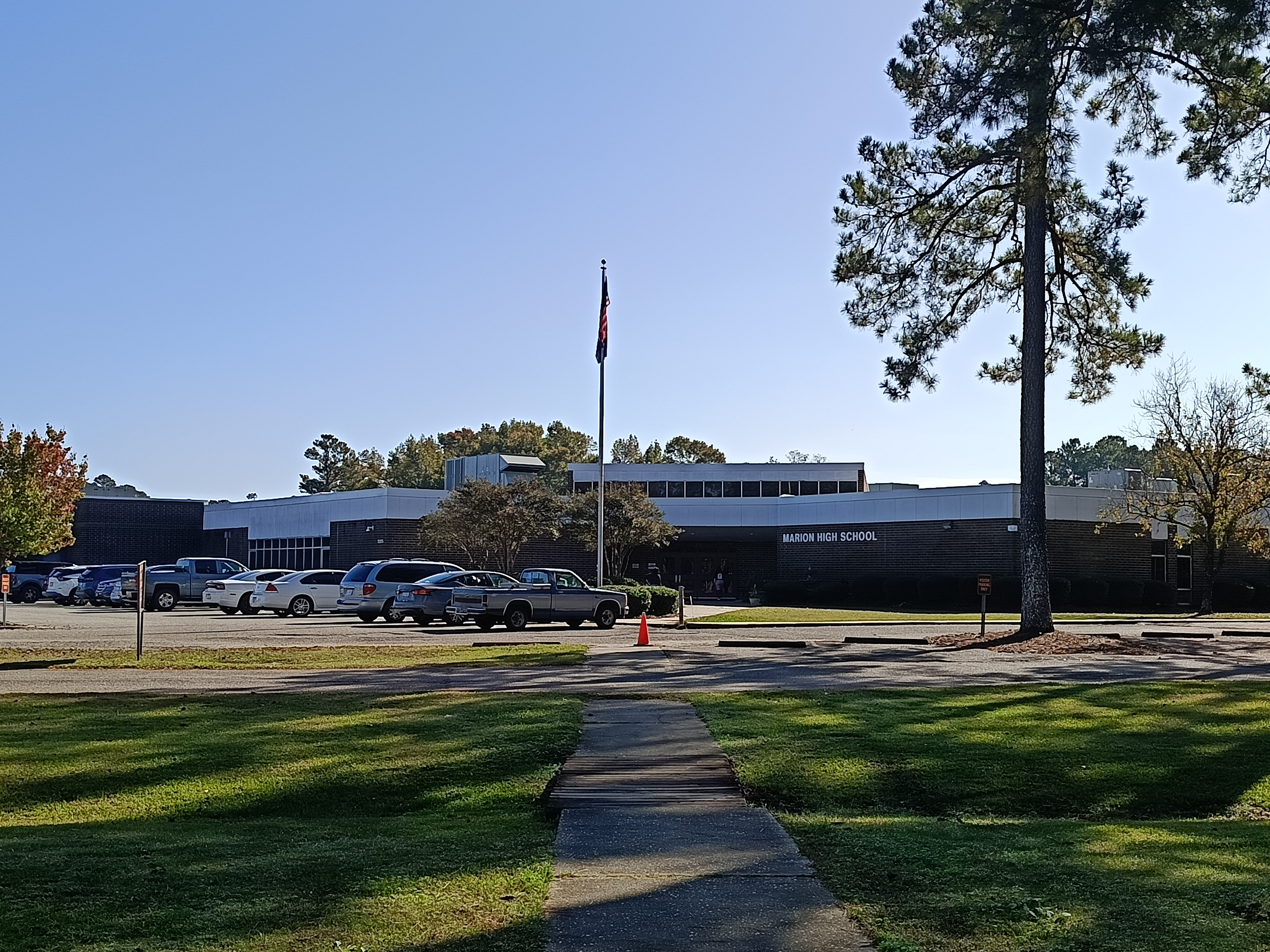
- Marion High School in 2024

- Location within South Carolina Location within the United States
- Location: 1205 S. Main St., Marion, South Carolina
- Coordinates: 34°11′6″N 79°24′5″W
- Area: 2.7 acres (1.1 ha)
- Built: 1923-1924
- Architect: Wilkins, W.J. & Co.; McBride, J.F.
- Architectural style: Late 19th- and early 20th-century American movements
- NRHP reference No.: 01000631
- Added to NRHP: June 6, 2001

Marion High School

Location
- 1205 South Main Street; Marion, United States, South Carolina 29571

Information
- School type: Public
- Motto: "Educate. Prepare. Inspire"
- Established: c.1923
- School district: Marion County School District
- NCES District ID: 4503908
- NCES School ID: 450390800765
- Principal: Dr. Samuel Tuten
- Grades: 9-12
- Gender: Female: 49%; Male: 51%
- Enrollment: 628
- Student to teacher ratio: 16:1
- Campus type: Rural
- Colors: Maroon and gold
- Mascot: Swamp fox
- Nickname: Marion Swamp Foxes
- Last updated: February 2025

Marion High School is a historic school building located at Marion, Marion County, South Carolina. The building serves as the headquarters for the Marion County School District since 1994. It was listed in the National Register of Historic Places in 2001.

== History ==
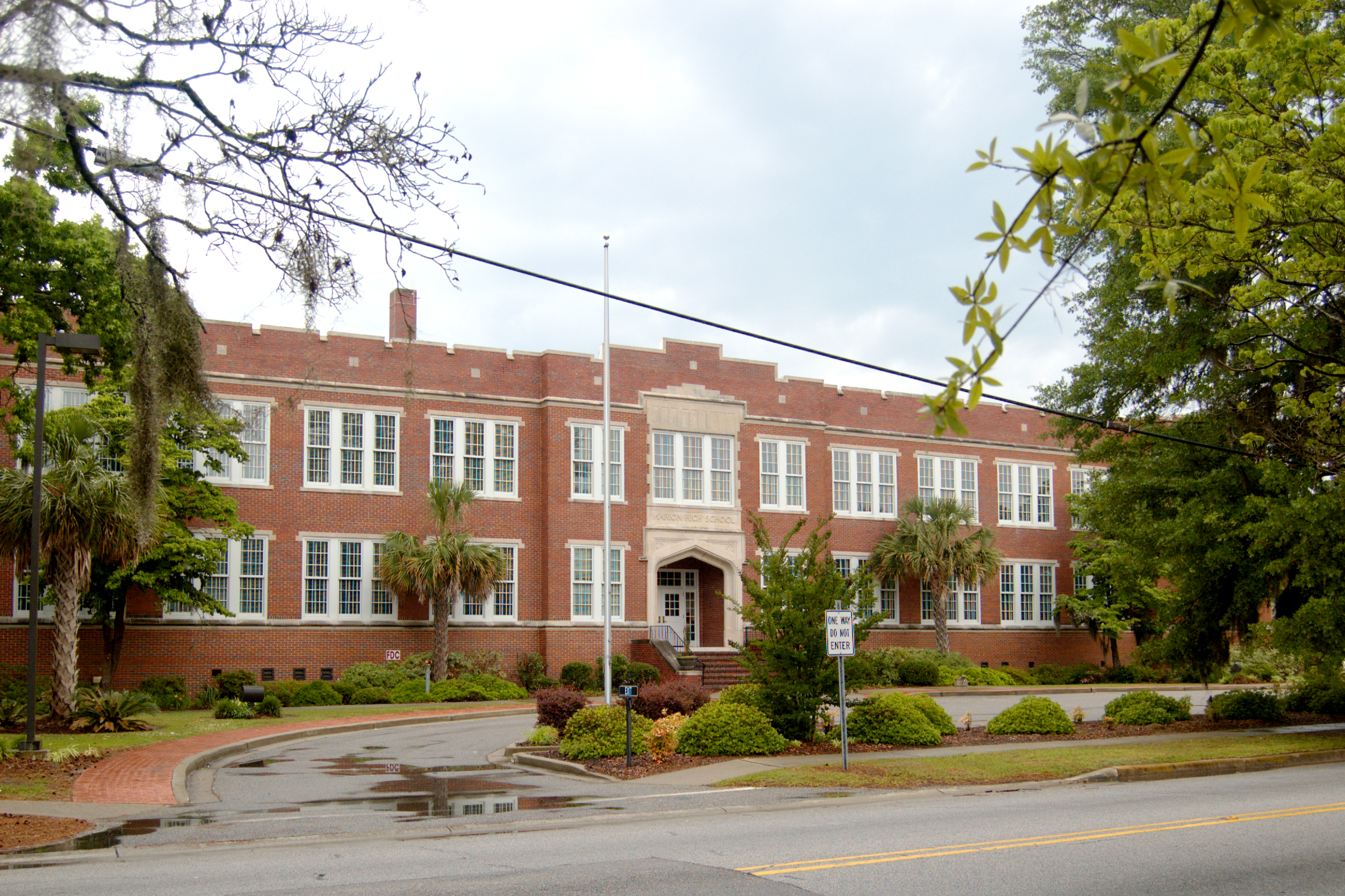
Marion High School from 1924 to 1976, now converted to Marion County School District building

It was built in 1923–1924, and is a one-story, Classical Revival style brick building. The building's main façade features baroque massing with projecting central and end pavilions. When built, the school included a gymnasium, a physics and chemistry laboratory, a domestic science department with sewing and cooking rooms, an agriculture laboratory, and a commercial department. The building served as a high school until 1975, then became the home for Marion Elementary School until 1994.
