= National Register of Historic Places listings in Dillon County, South Carolina =

Location of Dillon County in South Carolina

This is a list of the National Register of Historic Places listings in Dillon County, South Carolina.

This is intended to be a complete list of the properties and districts on the National Register of Historic Places in Dillon County, South Carolina, United States. The locations of National Register properties and districts for which the latitude and longitude coordinates are included below, may be seen in a map.

There are 20 properties and districts listed on the National Register in the county.

This National Park Service list is complete through NPS recent listings posted May 1, 2026.

== Current listings ==
	Name on the Register	Image	Date listed	Location	City or town	Description
1	Joel Allen House		August 13, 1974 (#74001848)	Northwest of Latta; 34°24′42″N 79°29′33″W	Latta	
2	Alpheus Victor Bethea and Martha Cooper Bethea Farmstead		September 26, 2024 (#100010894)	2547 SC Highway 34 West; 34°25′33″N 79°26′55″W	Dillon vicinity	
3	Catfish Creek Baptist Church	Catfish Creek Baptist Church	January 17, 1975 (#75001697)	5 miles northwest of Latta at the junction of County Roads 1741 and 1763; 34°21′55″N 79°29′36″W	Latta	
4	Dillon County Courthouse	Dillon County Courthouse	October 30, 1981 (#81000564)	1303 W. Main St. 34°25′05″N 79°22′32″W	Dillon	
5	Dillon Downtown Historic District	Dillon Downtown Historic District	January 24, 2003 (#01001549)	Roughly bounded by E. and W. Main St, N. and S. Railroad Ave, N. MacArthur Ave, and E. Harrison St. 34°25′00″N 79°22′17″W	Dillon	
6	Dillon Graded School and Dillon Public School		September 30, 2014 (#14000818)	405 W. Washington St. 34°25′18″N 79°22′25″W	Dillon	
7	James W. Dillon House	James W. Dillon House	May 6, 1971 (#71000769)	1302 W. Main St. 34°25′07″N 79°22′28″W	Dillon	
8	Early Cotton Press	Early Cotton Press	November 15, 1972 (#72001206)	Near the junction of South Carolina Highways 38 and 917; 34°20′11″N 79°31′11″W	Latta	
9	Hamer Hall	Hamer Hall	May 30, 1975 (#75001696)	North of Hamer on U.S. Route 301; 34°29′11″N 79°19′35″W	Hamer	
10	James W. Hamer House	James W. Hamer House	September 21, 2007 (#07000985)	1253 Harllees Bridge Rd. 34°28′10″N 79°24′40″W	Little Rock	
11	John Hayes Farmstead	John Hayes Farmstead	October 4, 2005 (#05001153)	1251 South Carolina Highway 38, W. 34°20′14″N 79°31′29″W	Latta	
12	Latimer High and Elementary School		May 20, 2024 (#100010400)	122 Latimer Street; 34°19′54″N 79°25′36″W	Latta	
13	Latta Downtown Historic District		May 20, 1998 (#98000555)	Roughly along E. and W. Main Sts. 34°20′15″N 79°25′57″W	Latta	
14	Latta Historic District No. 1	Latta Historic District No. 1	May 17, 1984 (#84002038)	Church, Marion, Bethea, Rice, Dew, Mauldin, and Main Sts. 34°20′25″N 79°26′03″W	Latta	
15	Latta Historic District No. 2	Latta Historic District No. 2	May 17, 1984 (#84002040)	Richardson St., Bamberg to Oak Sts. 34°20′19″N 79°25′50″W	Latta	
16	McMillan House	McMillan House	May 17, 1984 (#84002042)	206 Maion St. 34°20′12″N 79°26′06″W	Latta	
17	Meekins Barn		August 3, 1984 (#84003815)	Off South Carolina Highway 9; 34°22′25″N 79°16′02″W	Floydale	
18	St. Paul's Methodist Church	St. Paul's Methodist Church	July 26, 1977 (#77001220)	Off South Carolina Highway 9; 34°28′38″N 79°24′08″W	Little Rock	
19	Selkirk Farm	Selkirk Farm	July 24, 1974 (#74001847)	East of Bingham on Old Cashua Ferry Rd. 34°28′05″N 79°30′15″W	Bingham	
20	Smith Barn	Smith Barn	December 4, 1984 (#84000568)	East of Floydale; 34°20′32″N 79°15′10″W	Floydale	

== See also ==
- List of National Historic Landmarks in South Carolina
- National Register of Historic Places listings in South Carolina
