= Latta =

Latta may refer to:

== Buildings ==
- E. D. Latta Nurses' Residence building in North Carolina, USA
- Latta Arcade indoor shopping arcade in North Carolina, USA
- Latta Historic District No. 1 historic district in South Carolina, United States
- Latta Historic District No. 2 historic district in South Carolina, United States

== Companies ==
- Murray-Latta - British Columbian machine manufacturing and steel fabrication company
- Eckhaus Latta - America fashion brand

== Objects ==
- Latta Cotton Press, cotton press built around 1798, located south of Latta in Dillon County, South Carolina

== Places ==
- Latta Downtown Historic District, historic district in South Carolina, USA
- Latta Bridge, bridge in Alberta, Canada
- Port Latta, Tasmania, Australia, an iron ore port
- Latta Plantation in Huntersville, North Carolina, US
- Latta, Oklahoma, U.S.
- Latta, South Carolina, U.S.
- Latta Park Baseball Field - former ballpark located in Latta Park in Charlotte, North Carolina

== People with the surname ==
- Bob Latta (born 1956), American politician
- Christopher Collins (born Christopher Latta; 1949–1994), American voice actor
- David Latta (politician) (1869–1948), Canadian politician
- David Latta (ice hockey) (born 1967), Canadian ice hockey player in the National Hockey League
- Del Latta (1920–2016), American politician
- Frank Forrest Latta (1892–1983), American oral historian and ethnographer
- Harriet Nisbet Latta (1853–1910), North Carolina State Regent of the Daughters of the American Revolution
- Ivory Latta (born 1984), American basketball player
- James P. Latta (1844–1911), American politician
- James Latta (RAF officer) (1897–1974), British World War I flying ace
- John Latta (politician) (1835–1913), American politician
- Sir John Latta, 1st Baronet (1867–1946), Scottish shipping magnate
- Nigel Latta (1967–2025), New Zealand clinical psychologist, author, and broadcaster
- Reg Latta (1897–1970), Australian rugby league footballer
- Robert Latta, 1985 intruder in the White House
- Thomas Latta of Leith (1796–1833), father of intravenous therapy
- Zoe Latta, American fashion designer, co-director of the American fashion brand Eckhaus Latta

== See also ==
- Lotta (disambiguation)
- Lata (disambiguation)
