= James Addison Jones =

American businessman (1869-1950)

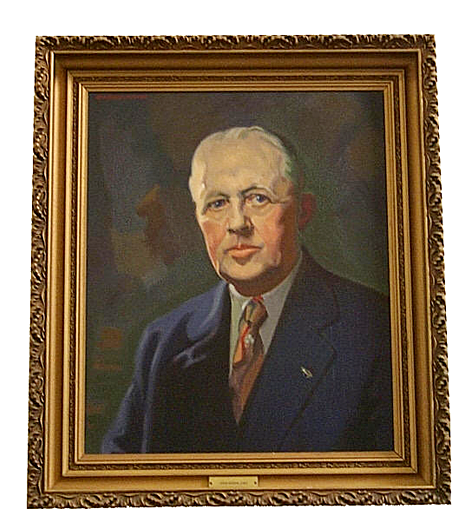
- Portrait of James Addison Jones in J.A. Jones Library at Brevard College in Brevard, North Carolina
- Born: August 20, 1869; Farmer, North Carolina, United States
- Died: May 25, 1950 (aged 80); North Carolina, United States
- Occupation: Businessman
- Spouse(s): Mary Jane "Minnie" Hooper Emma Lockhart Renn (m. 1915, died) Maude Boren (m. 1920, died) Rose Walsh (m. 1942)
- Children: 15
- Parents: Robert B. Jones (father); Elizabeth Horney Jones (mother)

James Addison Jones (20 August 1869 − 25 May 1950) was an American businessman and philanthropist. He was the founder of J.A. Jones Construction and supported many organizations such as the Methodist Church, the city of Charlotte, North Carolina, and surrounding areas, regional hospitals and several other companies. He was the benefactor and namesake for the James Addison Jones Library at Greensboro College, and the J.A. Jones Library at Brevard College. His company also contributed to the building of the Liberty fleet during World War II. Jones was married four times in his lifetime and had fifteen children.

== Early life ==
=== Birth and parentage ===
James Addison Jones was born in Farmer, North Carolina, on August 20, 1869, to Robert B. Jones and Elizabeth Horney Jones (21 August 1839 – 15 June 1872). Jones' siblings, in descending order, were: John, William, Sherman and Emma.

=== Childhood ===
Jones was only able to attend school a few months each year at a local one-room country school due to his responsibilities on the family farm. It is reported that he did not receive any formal education beyond the fourth grade. At the age of eighteen, he left home with no money and no formal skills to rely on.

In Lexington, North Carolina, Jones got his first job from David K. Cecil, a contractor building the first cotton mill in Charlotte, North Carolina, who hired him to drive a wagon, transporting the machine used to make bricks. Jones was paid twenty-five cents a day with room and board in the construction camp. He eventually became the mason’s tender and was later promoted to apprentice mason.

== Personal history ==
=== Marriages ===
Jones was married four times, losing his first three wives to illness, and was survived by his fourth wife. He had fifteen children with three of his wives, though five of his children predeceased him. Twice, after the loss of a wife, he was left to care for infant children and had to hire the help of a nurse or live-in housekeeper.

1. Mary Jane Hooper "Minnie" Jones met Mary Jane Hooper, known as "Minnie," through church. They had twelve children as follows: Edwin Lee, born 1891, Bobbie who died as an infant, Raymond Allen born 1894, Hannibal Berryman born 1897, Frances Elizabeth born 1900, James Addison Jr. born 1902, Johnie Hooper born 1904, Minnie Beatrice born 1906, William Franklin born 1908, Dorothy May born 1910, Paul Stewart born 1912, and Helen Estelle born 1914.
2. Emma Lockhart Renn Jones married again in September 1915 to Emma Lockhart Renn, a teacher, and they had two children together, Emma Renn in 1916 and Robert Joseph in 1918. The Jones family reached state and national recognition when they bought $15,000 for the War Savings Club in support of the First World War. It was the single highest donation in the nation.
3. Maude Boren Jones married Maude Boren in September 1920 and they had one child together, Charles Boren Jones on 12 June 1921.
4. Rose Walsh At age 72, Jones married Rose Walse on 16 January 1942. They did not have any children. Rose would survive Jones in 1950.

=== Children ===
1. Education: Five of his children (Edwin, Raymond, Minnie B, Dorothy, and Robert) successfully graduated from college
2. Family business: Three of his sons would go to work in J.A. Jones Construction
  1. Edwin was hired in 1913 and handled administrative duties within the company
  2. Raymond was the assistant superintendent of J.A. Jones
  3. Johnnie was in charge of accounting and office management
3. Deaths:
  1. Bobbie, died in infancy.
  2. Frances Elizabeth, died of tuberculosis in December 1925
  3. Johnnie, drowned in May 1935
  4. Raymond, died of stroke in May 1950

=== Later years and death ===
Jones remained active until the last final months of his life. During the winter of 1949-1950, he experienced health issues related to colds and influenza, leaving him slightly weakened. He also suffered a mild stroke that winter. Despite this, he continued to go to the office until three days before his death. He died from a cerebral hemorrhage at 7:46 p.m. on May 20, 1950, at the age of 80.

== Notable works ==
A number of his works are listed on the U.S. National Register of Historic Places.

Works include (with variations in attribution):

- Addison Apartments, 831 E. Morehead St., Charlotte, North Carolina (Jones, J.A.), NRHP-listed
- Dillon County Courthouse, built 1911, at 1303 W. Main St., Dillon, South Carolina (Jones, J.A.), NRHP-listed
- Fire Station No. 2, 1212 South Blvd., Charlotte, North Carolina (Jones, J.A.), NRHP-listed
- Frederick Apartments, 515 N. Church St., Charlotte, North Carolina (Jones, J.A., Construction Company), NRHP-listed
- Hoke County Courthouse, Main and Edenborough Sts., Raeford, North Carolina (Jones, J.A.), NRHP-listed
- Hoskins Mill, 201 S. Hoskins Rd., Charlotte, North Carolina (Jones, J.A., Construction Co.), NRHP-listed
- Hotel Charlotte (demolished 1988), 327 W. Trade St., Charlotte, North Carolina (Jones, J.A.), NRHP-listed
