= Frederick Apartments =

Frederick Apartments may refer to:

- Frederick Apartments (Columbia, Missouri)
- Frederick Apartments (Charlotte, North Carolina)
