= Cotton Press =

Cotton Press may refer to:

- Cotton Press (Latta, South Carolina)
- Cotton Press (Tarboro, North Carolina)
