= General Frost (disambiguation) =

General Frost is a nickname given to the Russian Winter. General Frost may also refer to:

- Daniel M. Frost (1823–1900), Missouri Volunteer Militia brigadier general and Confederate States Army brigadier general
- John Frost (British Army officer) (1912–1993), British Army major general
- Kathryn Frost (1948–2006), U.S. Army major general
- Malcolm B. Frost (born 1966), U.S. Army major general
