= Dillon Graded School and Dillon Public School =

- Dillon Graded and Dillon Public School
- U.S. National Register of Historic Places
- Location within South Carolina Location within the United States
- Location: 405 W. Washington St., Dillon, South Carolina
- Coordinates: 34°25′18″N 79°22′25″W
- Area: less than one acre
- Built: 1896
- NRHP reference No.: 14000818
- Added to NRHP: September 30, 2014

The Dillon Graded School and Dillon Public School, now the J. V. Martin Junior High School, are a pair of historic school buildings at 405 West Washington Street in Dillon, South Carolina. The Dillon Graded School, completed in 1896, is a two-story brick structure with a projecting tower section. The tower is adorned with round arches and brackets in the eaves. The Dillon Public School is also a two-story brick structure, but it was built in 1912 and is Classical Revival in style. It has a U-shaped plan, with its main facade facing North 3rd Avenue. This elevation features a full-height porch, supported by square columns and topped by a full gabled pediment. Additions were made to the school 1936 and 1957, and in 1970 it was renamed the J. V. Martin Junior High School. Its central core was destroyed by fire in 1980, but was re-built.

The school buildings were listed on the National Register of Historic Places in 2014.

== See also ==
- National Register of Historic Places listings in Dillon County, South Carolina
