= James W. Hamer House =

Historic house in South Carolina, United States

- U.S. National Register of Historic Places
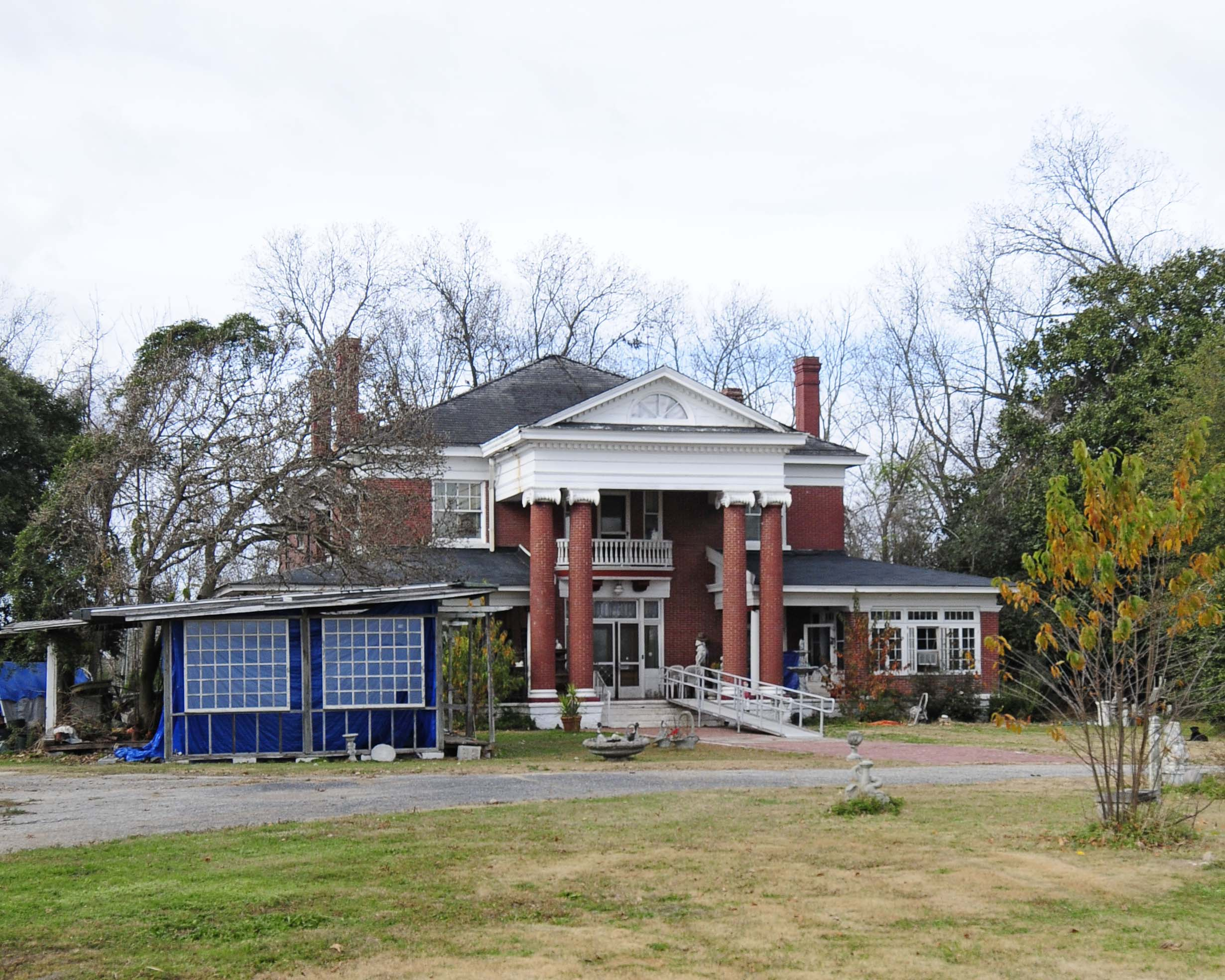

- Location within South Carolina Location within the United States
- Location: 1253 Harllees Bridge Rd., near Little Rock, South Carolina
- Coordinates: 34°28′10″N 79°24′40″W
- Area: 9.5 acres (3.8 ha)
- Built: 1910-1911
- Architect: Deibler, John Edward
- Architectural style: Classical Revival
- NRHP reference No.: 07000985
- Added to NRHP: September 21, 2007

The James W. Hamer House is a historic home located near Little Rock, Dillon County, South Carolina. It was built in 1910–1911, and is a large two-story, three-bay, brick-veneered Neo-Classical Revival style residence. It has four symmetrically placed exterior end brick chimneys. The front facade features an Ionic order pedimented portico supported by two sets of paired brick columns. Also located on the property are several agricultural outbuildings and a mature pecan orchard that was likely planted by about 1920. It was the home of James Willis Hamer, farmer, state representative, and state senator of Dillon County during its first half-century.

It was listed on the National Register of Historic Places in 2007.

== See also ==
- Hamer Hall, also in Dillon County, is also listed on the NRHP
