= Old Ebenezer Church =

Historic church in South Carolina, United States

- U.S. National Register of Historic Places
- Location within South Carolina Location within the United States
- Location: 5 miles south of Latta on South Carolina Highway 38, near Latta, South Carolina
- Coordinates: 34°17′20″N 79°23′10″W
- Area: 1 acre (0.40 ha)
- Built: 1856
- Architect: Dillon, William
- NRHP reference No.: 73001719
- Added to NRHP: March 30, 1973

Old Ebenezer Church, also known as Ebenezer Methodist Episcopal Church, South, is a historic church located near Latta, Marion County, South Carolina. It was built in 1856, and is a one-story, rectangular meeting house style frame church sheathed in white clapboard. It has two entrances on the main façade, corresponding doors on the rear façade, and a gable roof.

It was added to the National Register of Historic Places in 1973.
