= William H. Peeps =

American architect

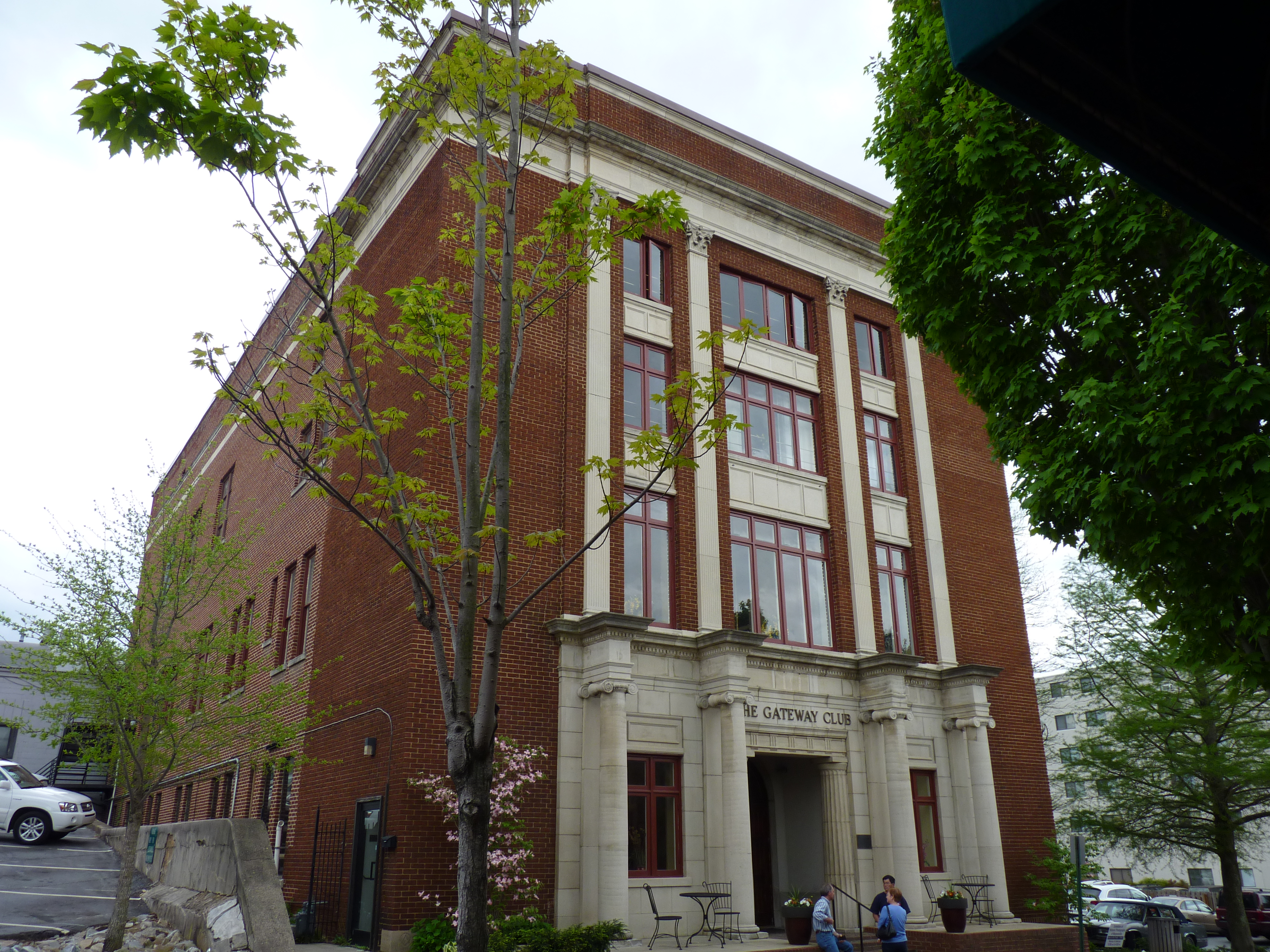
Masonic Hall (Waynesville, North Carolina)

William H. Peeps (1868–1950) was an American architect.

At least two of his works are listed on the U.S. National Register of Historic Places (NRHP).

Works include:

- Latta Arcade, 320 S. Tryon St., Charlotte, North Carolina, NRHP-listed
- Masonic Hall, 114 Church St., Waynesville, North Carolina, NRHP-listed
