= Joel Allen House =

Historic house in South Carolina, United States

- U.S. National Register of Historic Places
- Location within South Carolina Location within the United States
- Location: Northwest of Latta, Latta, South Carolina
- Coordinates: 34°24′42″N 79°29′33″W
- Area: 3 acres (1.2 ha)
- Built: 1857
- Built by: Sanderson, Solomon
- NRHP reference No.: 74001848
- Added to NRHP: August 13, 1974

Joel Allen House is a historic home located near Latta, Dillon County, South Carolina. It was built in 1857, and is a two-story, frame South Carolina upcountry farmhouse. It is sheathed in weatherboard and has an interior floor plan of two rooms flanking a central hall. It features a full-width front porch supported by six square wooden columns. Located on the property are the contributing smokehouse, wash house, commissary, stable, and barn.

It was listed on the National Register of Historic Places in 1974.
