= Dillon Downtown Historic District =

Historic district in South Carolina, United States

- U.S. National Register of Historic Places
- U.S. Historic district
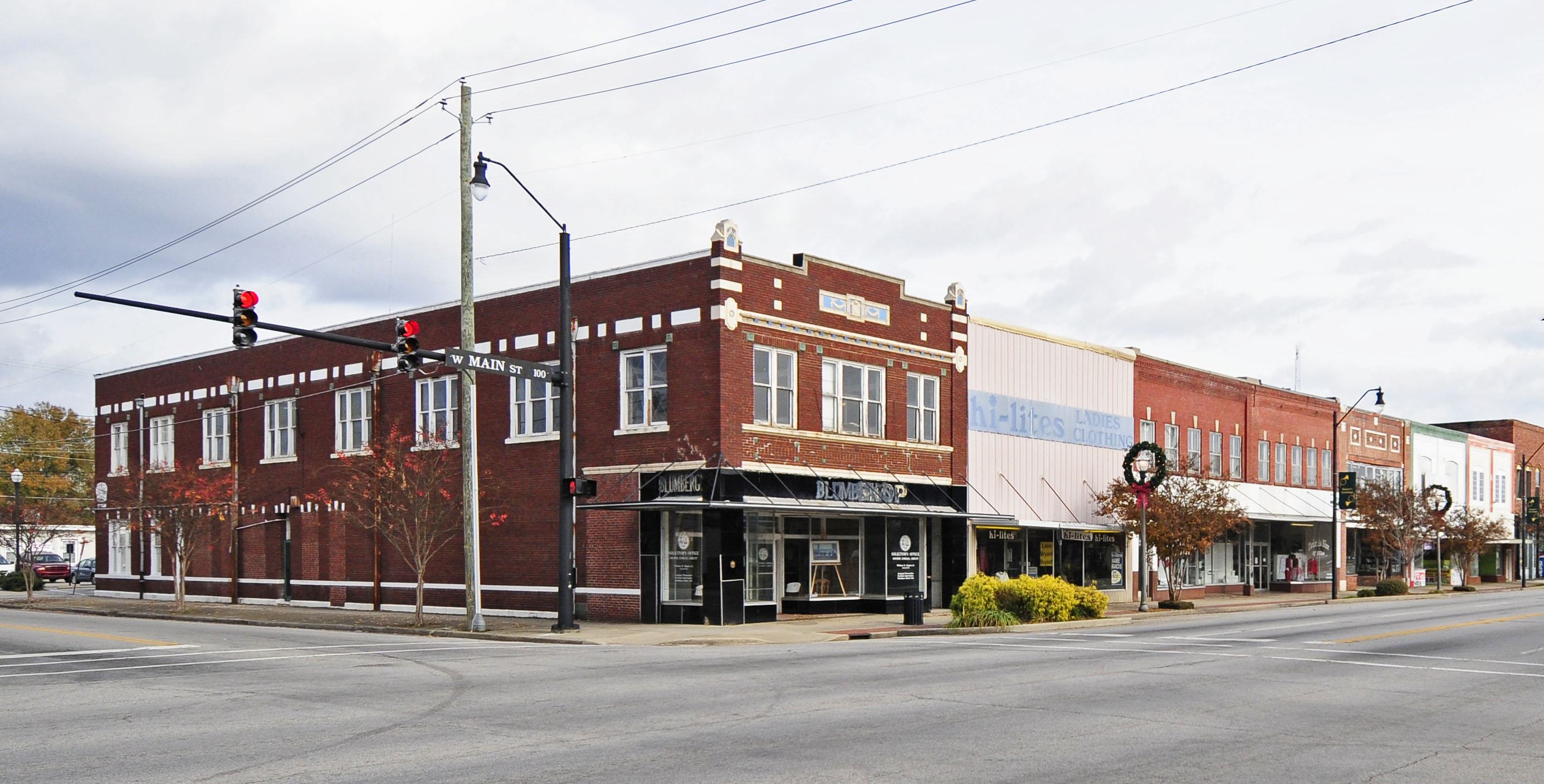
- Dillon Downtown Historic District, December 2012

- Location within South Carolina Location within the United States
- Location: Roughly bounded by E and W Main St, N and S Railroad Ave, N MacArthur Ave, and E Harrison St., Dillon, South Carolina
- Coordinates: 34°20′15″N 79°25′57″W
- Area: 12.7 acres (5.1 ha)
- Architectural style: Late 19th And 20th Century Revivals, Late 19th And Early 20th Century American Movements
- NRHP reference No.: 01001549
- Added to NRHP: January 24, 2003

Dillon Downtown Historic District is a national historic district located at Dillon, Dillon County, South Carolina. The district encompasses 66 contributing buildings in the central business district of Latta. The buildings were erected between about 1903 to 1948. The district's buildings reflect the one- and two-part commercial blocks found in towns throughout the nation and represent stylistic influences ranging from late Victorian period examples displaying elaborate brick-corbeled cornices and pediments to the more simplified and minimalist Depression-era examples with typical low relief detailing and vertical piers. The 1911 Neo-Classical Dillon County Courthouse, corner stores and banks featuring Classical Revival vocabulary, the brick depot, other highly decorative buildings, as well as modest but intact commercial stores help to define and anchor the district along both the town's Main Street and its intersecting railroad corridor.

It was listed on the National Register of Historic Places in 2003.
