= Meekins Barn =

- U.S. National Register of Historic Places
- Location within South Carolina Location within the United States
- Location: Off South Carolina Highway 9, near Floydale, South Carolina
- Coordinates: 34°22′25″N 79°16′2″W
- Area: 0.2 acres (0.081 ha)
- MPS: Flue-Cured Tobacco Production Properties TR
- NRHP reference No.: 84003815
- Added to NRHP: August 3, 1984

Meekins Barn is a historic tobacco barn located near Floydale, Dillon County, South Carolina, United States. It was built before 1935, and is an example of a log tobacco barn. It is a large, five -"room" log barn with a metal-covered gable roof. The building has an arched firebox on the left elevation, a brick foundation reinforced by concrete, and weatherboard has been added between the logs. The gable ends are also weatherboarded.

It was listed on the National Register of Historic Places in 1984.
