= Hoskins Mill =

Historic cotton mill in North Carolina, US

- U.S. National Register of Historic Places
- Location within North Carolina Location within the United States
- Location: 201 S. Hoskins Rd., Charlotte, North Carolina
- Coordinates: 35°15′49″N 80°53′11″W
- Area: 4 acres (1.6 ha)
- Built: 1903-1904
- Built by: Jones, J.A., Construction Co.
- NRHP reference No.: 88001702
- Added to NRHP: October 5, 1988

Hoskins Mill is a historic cotton mill located at Charlotte, Mecklenburg County, North Carolina. It was built in 1903–1904, and is a rectangular brick building consisting of a three-story, main section with a one-story weaving room addition. The floor of the mill was used for weaving, the second for carding, and the third for spinning. Also on the property is a 1 1/2-story, rectangular brick office building. It was used as a mill through 1985.

It was added to the National Register of Historic Places in 1988.
