= St. Paul's Methodist Church (Little Rock, South Carolina) =

Historic church in South Carolina, United States

- U.S. National Register of Historic Places
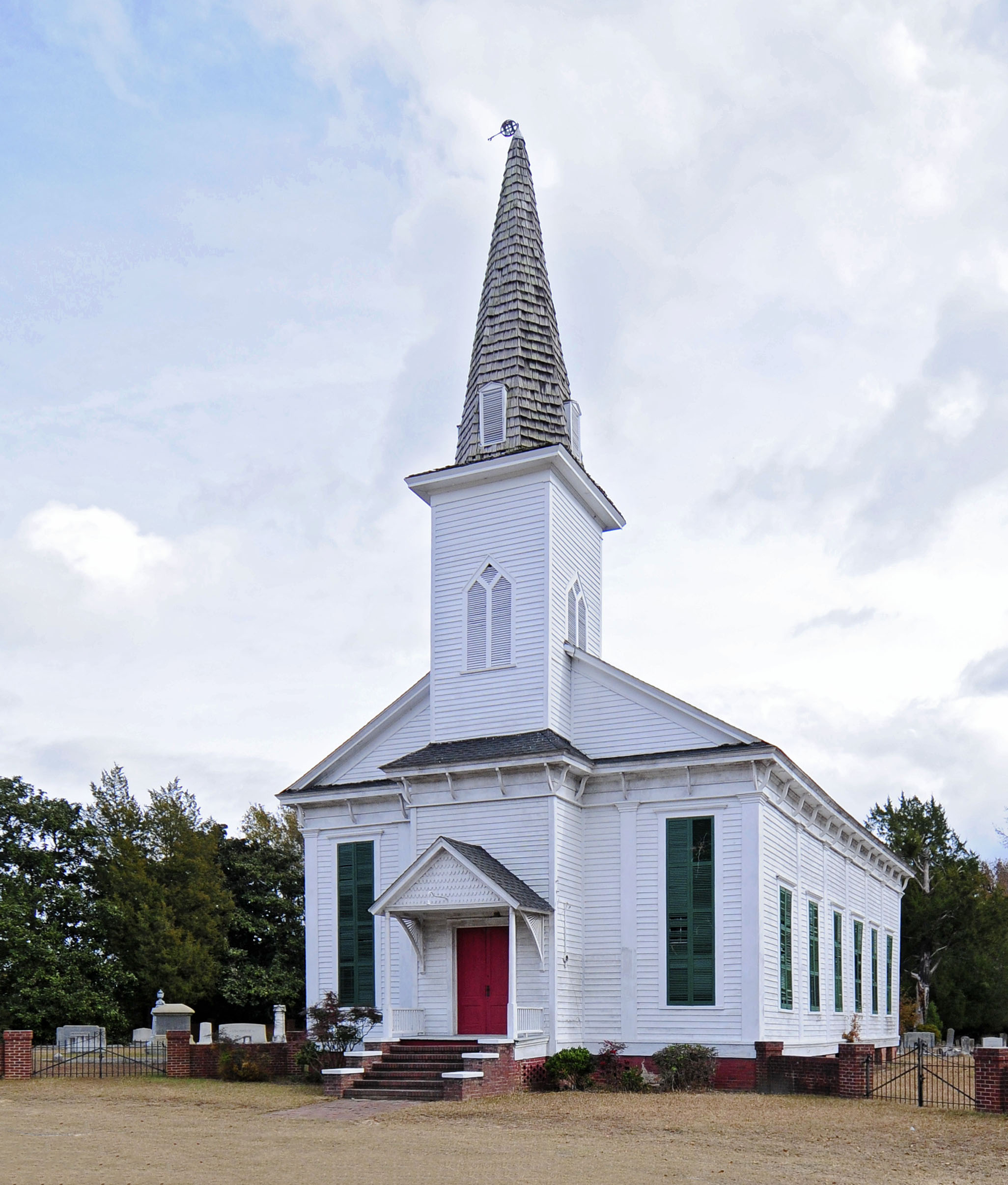

- Location within South Carolina Location within the United States
- Location: Off SC 9, Little Rock, South Carolina
- Coordinates: 34°28′38″N 79°24′8″W
- Area: 1 acre (0.40 ha)
- Built: 1871
- Architectural style: Italianate
- NRHP reference No.: 77001220
- Added to NRHP: July 26, 1977

St. Paul's Methodist Church is a historic Methodist church off SC 9 in Little Rock, Dillon County, South Carolina. It was built about 1871, and is constructed of heart pine weatherboarding in a transitional Italianate Victorian vernacular style. A bell tower with octagonal steeple dominates the exterior of the church. Surrounding the church is the cemetery where many early church members are buried.

It was listed on the U.S. National Register of Historic Places in 1977.
