= Latta Arcade =

- U.S. National Register of Historic Places
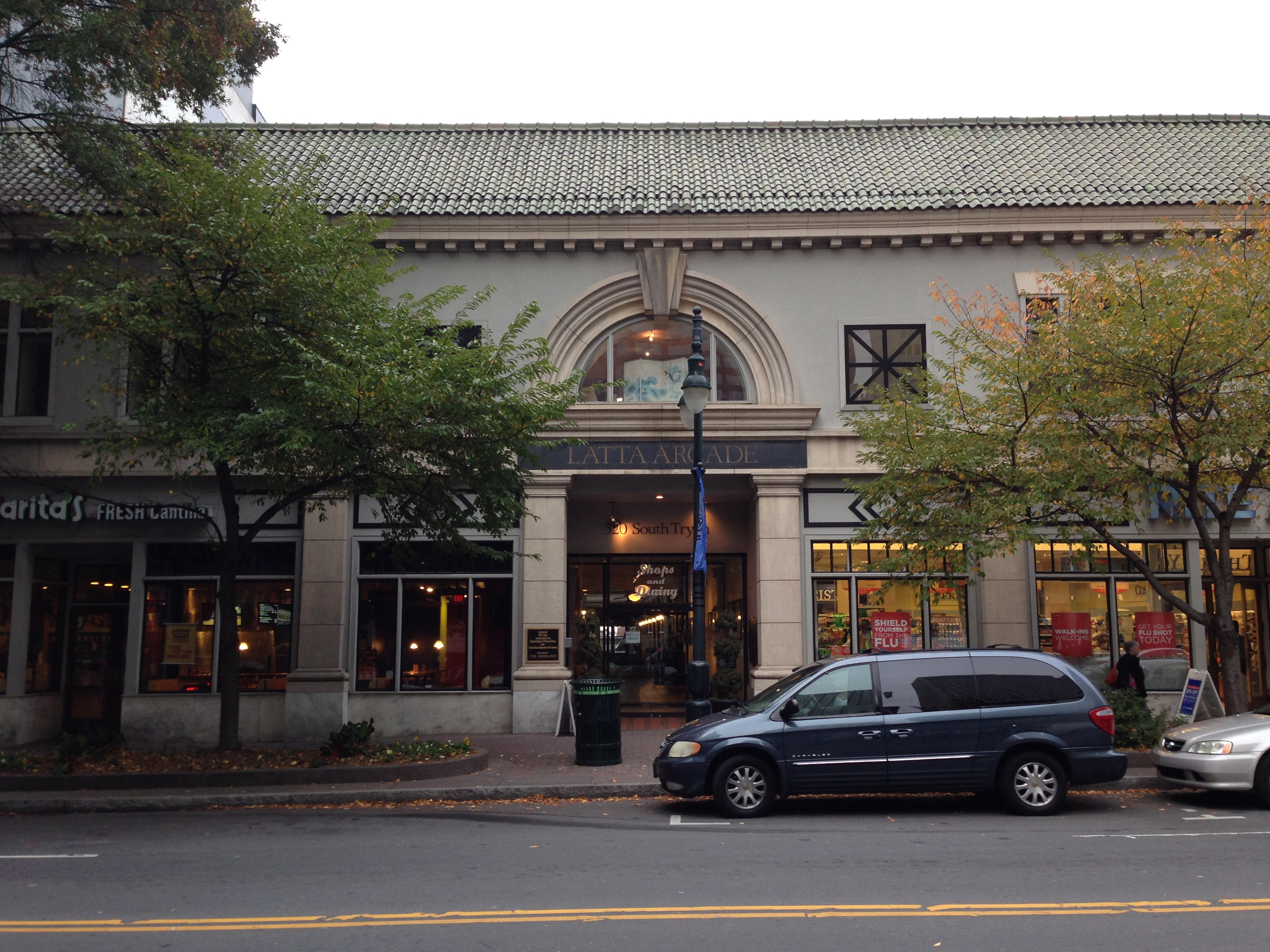

- Location within North Carolina Location within the United States
- Location: 320 S. Tryon St., Charlotte, North Carolina
- Coordinates: 35°13′32″N 80°50′45″W
- Area: 2,072 square yards (1,732 m^{2})
- Built: 1914
- Architect: William H. Peeps
- NRHP reference No.: 75001282
- Added to NRHP: October 29, 1975

The Latta Arcade is an indoor shopping arcade located at 320 S. Tryon St. in Charlotte, Mecklenburg County, North Carolina. It was built in 1914 to include a two floor atrium with stores and restaurants. There is a glass skylight over the atrium, which was originally used to allow natural light for grading cotton. It was designed by architect William H. Peeps.

It was listed on the National Register of Historic Places in 1975.

== Gallery ==
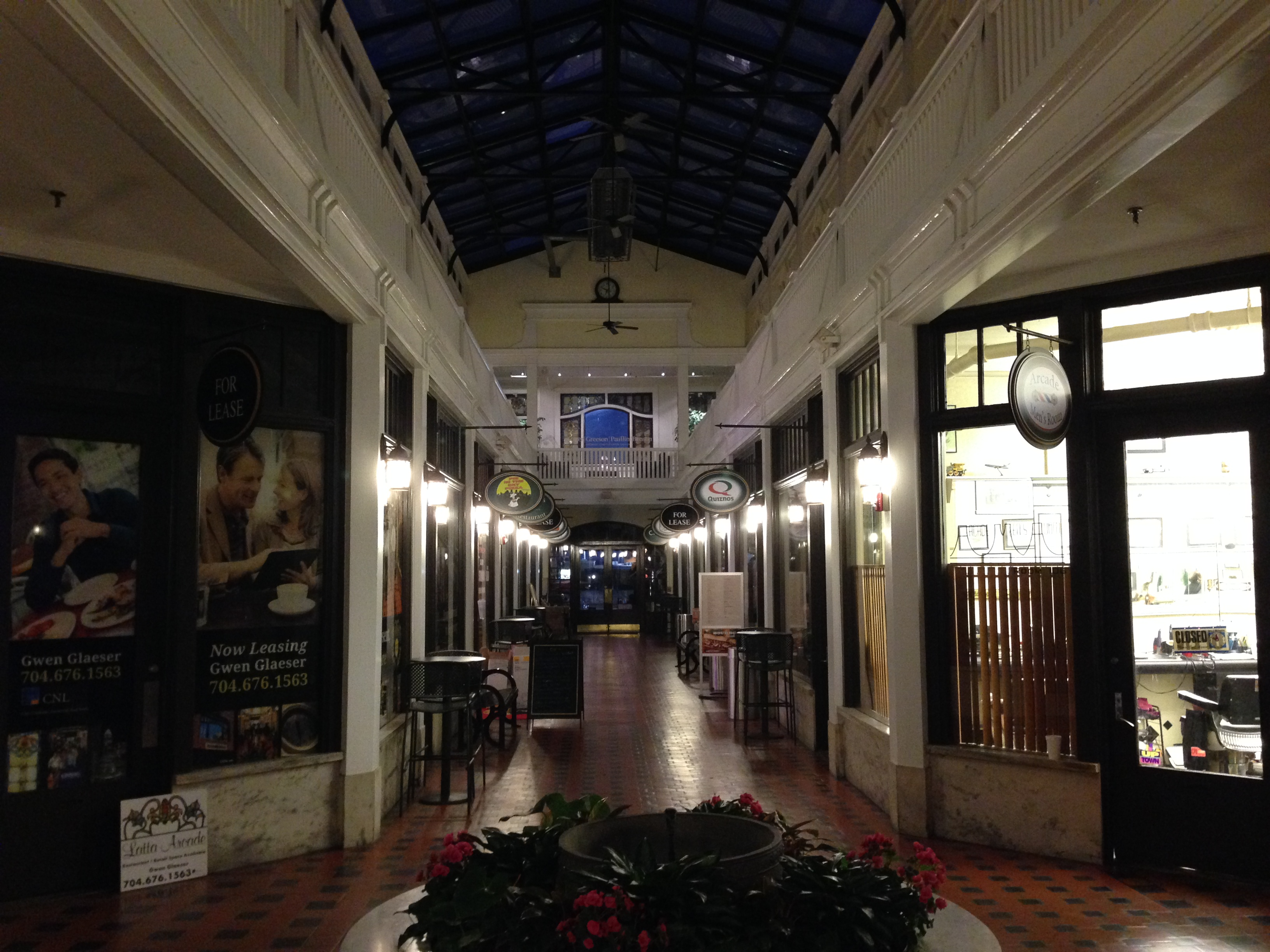
Latta Arcade, interior, Charlotte, NC
