= Kathryn Frost =

United States general (1948–2006)

Kathryn Carlson-Frost
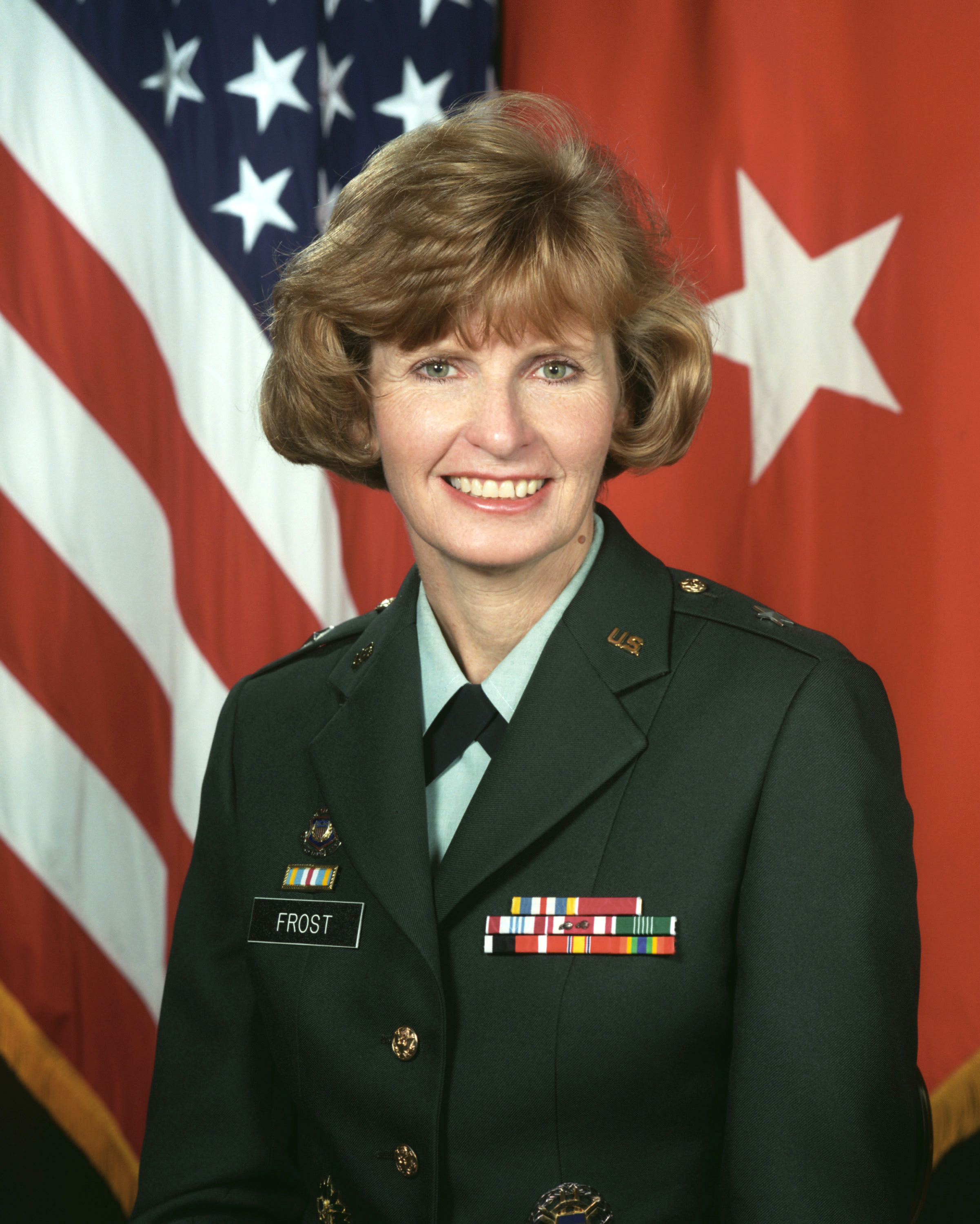
- Born: November 7, 1948; Latta, South Carolina
- Died: August 18, 2006 (aged 57); Latta, South Carolina
- Military career
- Allegiance: United States
- Branch: United States Army
- Service years: 1974–2005
- Rank: Major General
- Commands: Army and Air Force Exchange Service
- Awards: Army Distinguished Service Medal; Defense Superior Service Medal; Legion of Merit

Kathryn George Frost (November 7, 1948 – August 18, 2006) was an American military officer who was the commander of the United States Army and Air Force Exchange Service from August 2002 to April 2005. A major general, at the time of her retirement, she was the highest-ranking woman in the United States Army. She was also the wife of former United States Representative Martin Frost of Texas.

== Early life and education ==
Frost held a Bachelor of Arts in Education from the University of South Carolina and a Master of Arts in Counseling from Wayne State University.

== Military career ==
Frost's military career covered thirty-one years and included a four-year assignment as the Adjutant General of the United States Army, with concurrent assignment as the Commanding General, Physical Disability Agency, and Executive Director, Military Postal Service Agency, and as the Commander, Eastern Sector, United States Military Entrance Processing Command. She served on the staff of then-Chairman of the Joint Chiefs of Staff Colin Powell during the 1991 Gulf War and as a White House aide under the first Bush and Reagan administrations.

Following her retirement from the army, she was offered the position of executive director of the American Association of University Women, an offer she was forced to decline for health reasons. Frost died on August 18, 2006, from breast cancer.

== Personal life ==
Shortly before assuming the post at AAFES, Frost was diagnosed with breast cancer. She publicly stated that her military training gave her an advantage in dealing with cancer.
