= McMillan House (Latta, South Carolina) =

Historic house in South Carolina, United States

- U.S. National Register of Historic Places
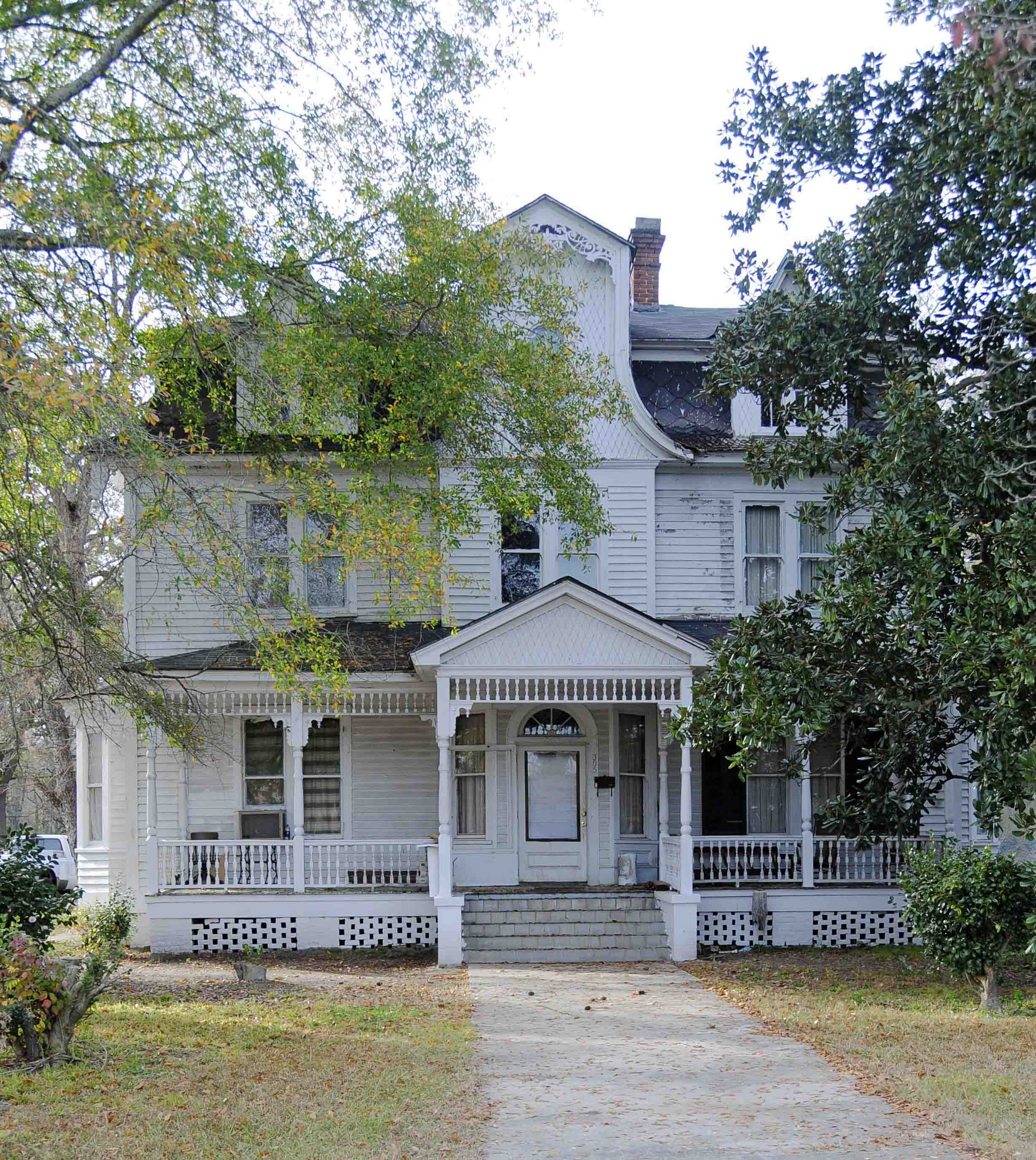
- McMillan House, December 2012

- Location within South Carolina Location within the United States
- Location: 206 Maion St., Latta, South Carolina
- Coordinates: 34°20′12″N 79°26′6″W
- Area: 0.5 acres (0.20 ha)
- Built: c. 1890
- Architectural style: Second Empire
- MPS: Latta MRA
- NRHP reference No.: 84002042
- Added to NRHP: May 17, 1984

McMillan House is a historic home located at Latta, Dillon County, South Carolina. It was built about 1890, and is a 2 1/2-story, frame, weatherboarded, Second Empire style residence. It has a mansard roof and features a one-story, hip-roofed porch, and a gabled entrance portico with sawtooth shingles. The front façade also has a central projecting bay. It was the home of S.A. McMillan, one of Latta's prominent early businessmen.

It was listed on the National Register of Historic Places in 1984.
