= Selkirk Farm =

Historic house in South Carolina, United States

- U.S. National Register of Historic Places
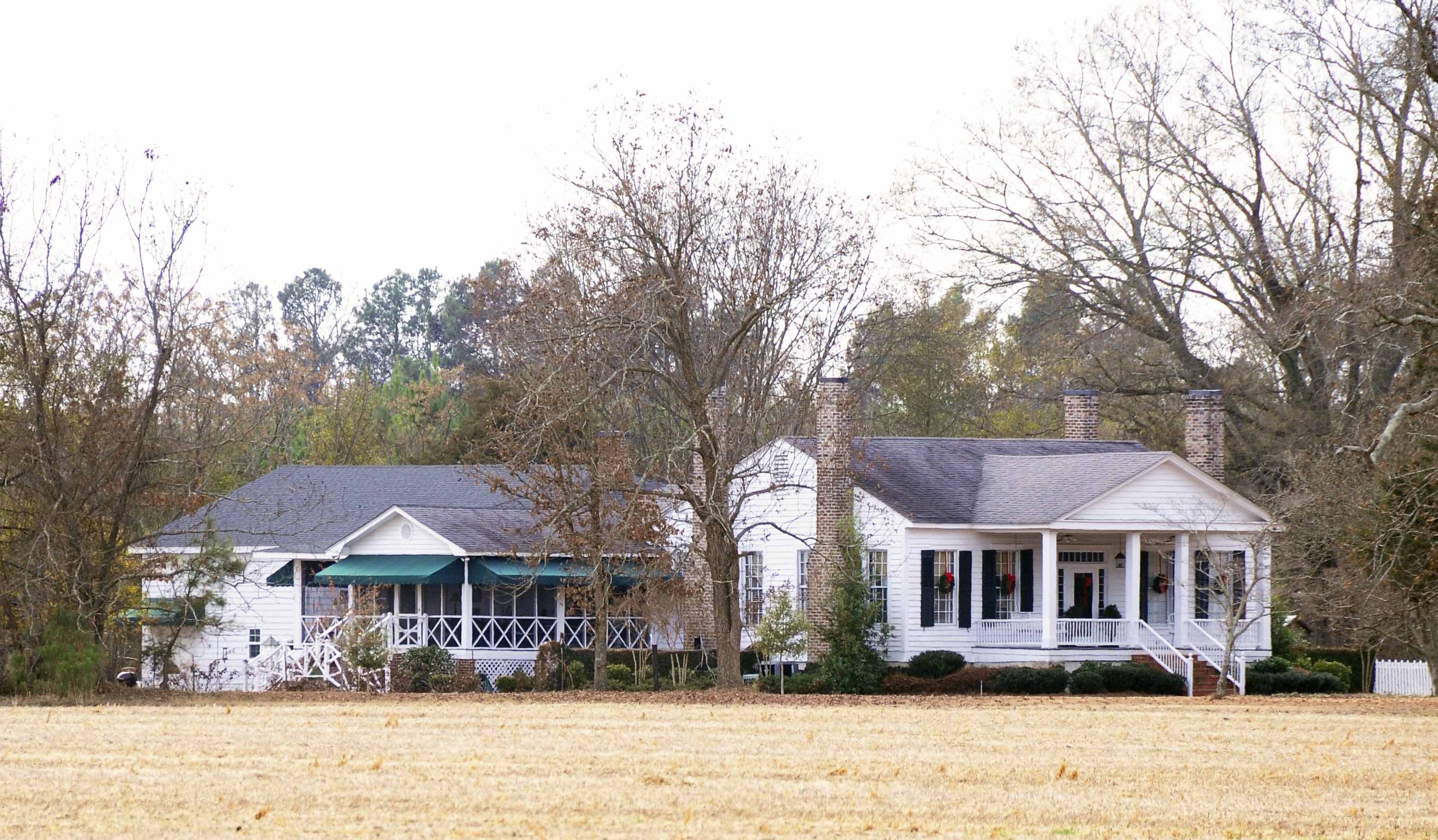
- Selkirk Farm, December 2012

- Location within South Carolina Location within the United States
- Location: East of Bingham on Old Cashua Ferry Rd., near Bingham, South Carolina
- Coordinates: 34°28′5″N 79°30′15″W
- Area: 3 acres (1.2 ha)
- Built: 1858
- Built by: Case Cousar
- Architectural style: Greek Revival
- NRHP reference No.: 74001847
- Added to NRHP: July 24, 1974

Selkirk Farm, also known as the Reverend James A. Cousar House, is a historic home located near Bingham, Dillon County, South Carolina. It was built in 1858, with additions made between 1880 and 1910, and is a one-story, clapboard Greek Revival style cottage of heart pine. The front façade features a pedimented porch with four square columns. The house rests on brick foundation pillars. The property also includes an antebellum cotton gin and a well.

It was listed on the National Register of Historic Places in 1974.
