= Little Rock, South Carolina =

- Census-designated place
- Location within South Carolina Location within the United States
- Coordinates: 34°28′05″N 79°22′50″W
- Country: United States
- State: South Carolina
- County: Dillon

Area
  - Total: 2.46 sq mi (6.37 km^{2})
  - Land: 2.46 sq mi (6.37 km^{2})
  - Water: 0 sq mi (0.00 km^{2})
- Elevation: 131 ft (40 m)

Population (2020)
  - Total: 658
  - Density: 267.6/sq mi (103.34/km^{2})
- Time zone: UTC-5 (Eastern (EST))
  - Summer (DST): UTC-4 (EDT)
- ZIP code: 29567
- Area codes: 843, 854
- GNIS feature ID: 2812949

Little Rock is an unincorporated community and census-designated place (CDP) in Dillon County, South Carolina, United States. Per the 2020 census, the population was 658.

The community is at the northwest end of the concurrency between South Carolina Highways 9 and 57.

The James W. Hamer House and St. Paul's Methodist Church are listed on the U.S. National Register of Historic Places. The median home price in Little Rock was $37,900 in 2017. There is no metro area in Little Rock.

The only railroad service within Little Rock is the CSX Andrews Subdivision, a former Seaboard Air Line Railroad line that now serves only freight.

== Demographics ==
Historical population
Census	Pop.	Note	%±
2020	658		—
U.S. Decennial Census; 2020

Little Rock first appeared as a census designated place in the 2020 U.S. census.

=== 2020 census ===
Little Rock CDP, South Carolina – Demographic Profile (NH = Non-Hispanic) Note: the US Census treats Hispanic/Latino as an ethnic category. This table excludes Latinos from the racial categories and assigns them to a separate category. Hispanics/Latinos may be of any race.
Race / Ethnicity	Pop 2020	% 2020
White alone (NH)	158	24.01%
Black or African American alone (NH)	384	58.36%
Native American or Alaska Native alone (NH)	11	1.67%
Asian alone (NH)	0	0.00%
Pacific Islander alone (NH)	0	0.00%
Some Other Race alone (NH)	1	0.15%
Mixed Race/Multi-Racial (NH)	25	3.80%
Hispanic or Latino (any race)	79	12.01%
Total	658	100.00%
