= Floydale, South Carolina =

Floydale
- Census-designated place
- Location within the state of South Carolina
- Coordinates: 34°19′26″N 79°20′10″W
- Country: United States
- State: South Carolina
- County: Dillon

Area
  - Total: 2.03 sq mi (5.25 km^{2})
  - Land: 2.03 sq mi (5.25 km^{2})
  - Water: 0 sq mi (0.00 km^{2})

Population (2020)
  - Total: 421
  - Density: 207.6/sq mi (80.16/km^{2})
- Time zone: UTC-5 (Eastern (EST))
  - Summer (DST): UTC-4 (EDT)
- FIPS code: 45-25945
- GNIS feature ID: 2812952

Floyd Dale, shown on federal maps as Floydale, is an unincorporated community and census-designated place (CDP) in Dillon County, South Carolina, United States. It was first listed as a CDP in the 2020 census with a population of 421.

Near Floyd Dale, there is the Diversified Communications Tower, a guyed mast, which is one of the tallest constructions in the world. This town is home to the Benton family, for whom the main road is named.

The Meekins Barn and Smith Tobacco Barn are listed on the U.S. National Register of Historic Places.

== Demographics ==
Historical population
Census	Pop.	Note	%±
2020	421		—
U.S. Decennial Census; 2020

Floydale first appeared as a census designated place in the 2020 U.S. census.

=== 2020 census ===
Floydale CDP, South Carolina – Demographic Profile (NH = Non-Hispanic)
Race / Ethnicity	Pop 2020	% 2020
White alone (NH)	308	73.16%
Black or African American alone (NH)	80	19.00%
Native American or Alaska Native alone (NH)	8	1.90%
Asian alone (NH)	1	0.24%
Pacific Islander alone (NH)	0	0.00%
Some Other Race alone (NH)	2	0.48%
Mixed Race/Multi-Racial (NH)	12	2.85%
Hispanic or Latino (any race)	10	2.38%
Total	421	100.00%

Note: the US Census treats Hispanic/Latino as an ethnic category. This table excludes Latinos from the racial categories and assigns them to a separate category. Hispanics/Latinos can be of any race.
