= Addison Apartments =

Historic building in North Carolina, US

- U.S. National Register of Historic Places
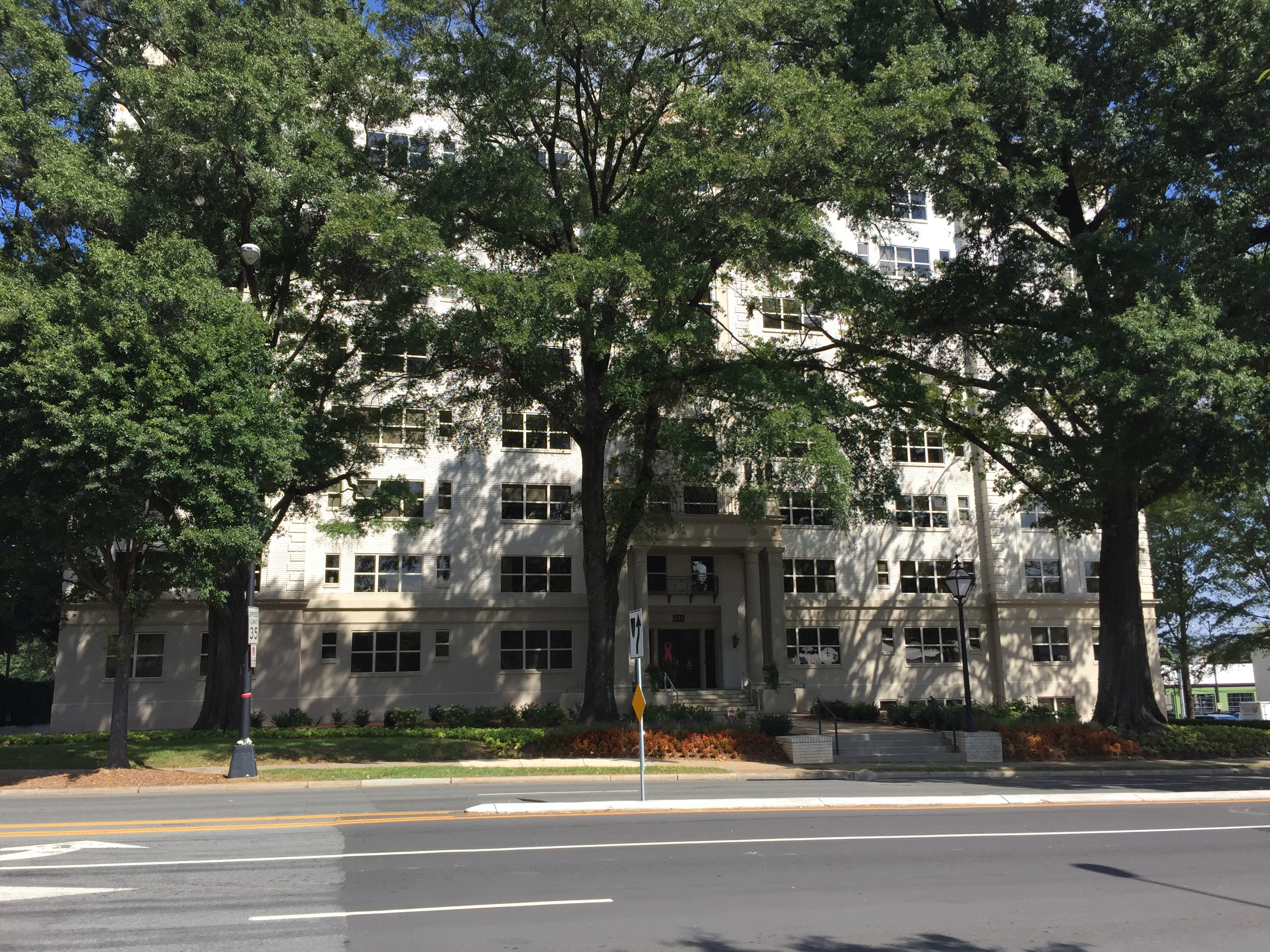

- Location within North Carolina Location within the United States
- Location: 831 E. Morehead St. Charlotte, North Carolina
- Coordinates: 35°12′50″N 80°50′41″W
- Area: 1 acre (0.40 ha)
- Built: 1926
- Built by: J.A. Jones
- Architect: Willard G. Rogers
- Architectural style: Classical Revival
- NRHP reference No.: 90001314
- Added to NRHP: August 23, 1990

Addison Apartments is a historic apartment building located at Charlotte, Mecklenburg County, North Carolina. It was built in 1926, and is a nine-story, steel frame building sheathed in light brick and cast stone. The Classical Revival-style building consists of a two-story base, six-story shaft, and one-story capital with a distinctive stepped pediment. The front facade features a two-story portico with a deck.

It was listed on the National Register of Historic Places in 1990.
