= Smith Tobacco Barn =

- Smith Barn
- U.S. National Register of Historic Places
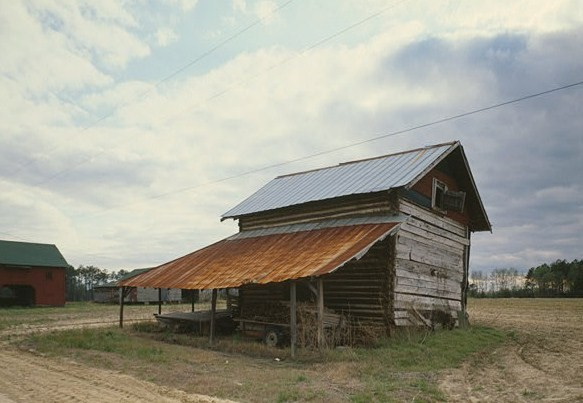
- Smith Tobacco Barn in 1987

- Location within South Carolina Location within the United States
- Nearest city: Floydale, South Carolina
- Coordinates: 34°20′32″N 79°15′10″W
- Built: 1942
- Architect: King, J.L.
- Architectural style: Flue-Cured Tobacco Barn
- MPS: Flue-Cured Tobacco Production Properties TR
- NRHP reference No.: 84000568
- Added to NRHP: December 4, 1984

The Smith Tobacco Barn is a flue-cured tobacco barn in Dillon County, South Carolina. It is on the east side of a dirt road, 0.25 mi (0.4 km) south of South Carolina State Highway 17–34, 0.5 mi (0.8 km) north of South Carolina State Highway 17–155, and about 1 mi (1.6 km) east of the intersection of South Carolina State Highway 17-22 and South Carolina State Highway 155. It was named to the National Register of Historic Places on December 4, 1984.

== History ==
Bright tobacco was introduced in South Carolina in the 1880s and 1890s. This grows well in the sandy, loamy soils of the Pee Dee and is flue-cured. The traditional barns had one or two fireboxes using wood or coal. In the 1950s, many barns were changed to gas or oil heat for better temperature regulation.

Tobacco leaves were strung onto tobacco poles that were laid across horizontal tier poles in the barn. There were three drying stages. The first stage at 95 °F (35 °C) to 110 °F (43 °C) yellowed the leaves. In the second stage, the temperature was raised to 130 °F (54 °C) to 135 °F (57 °C) to dry the leaves. The final stage was at 160 °F (71 °C) to 170 °F (77 °C) to dry the stems.

== Description ==
The barn is rectangular with a metal gable roof and a brick foundation. The walls up to the eaves are sawn timber. The timbers are notched at the corners and have mortar chinking. The gable ends are covered with horizontal weatherboarding. There are small rectangular doors in the gables that can be opened for ventilation. On the south and east sides, there are metal shed roofs supported by posts. These sheds provided shade for stringing leaves. The east and west sides have small doors at ground level. The name "J. L. King" and the date "1942" are scratched into the chinking. The barn was divided into five "rooms" or "bents" by wooden tier poles.

On the south end, there is a brick, double-arched firebox that has been bricked in. As can be seen in other photographs, the fuel was later changed to gas.

At the time of its nomination, it was said to be no longer used as a tobacco barn, but was considered the most intact tobacco barn in Dillon and Marion counties built between 1895 and the 1950s. It was also described as an "extremely fragile resource."
