= Catfish Creek Baptist Church =

Historic church in South Carolina, United States

- U.S. National Register of Historic Places
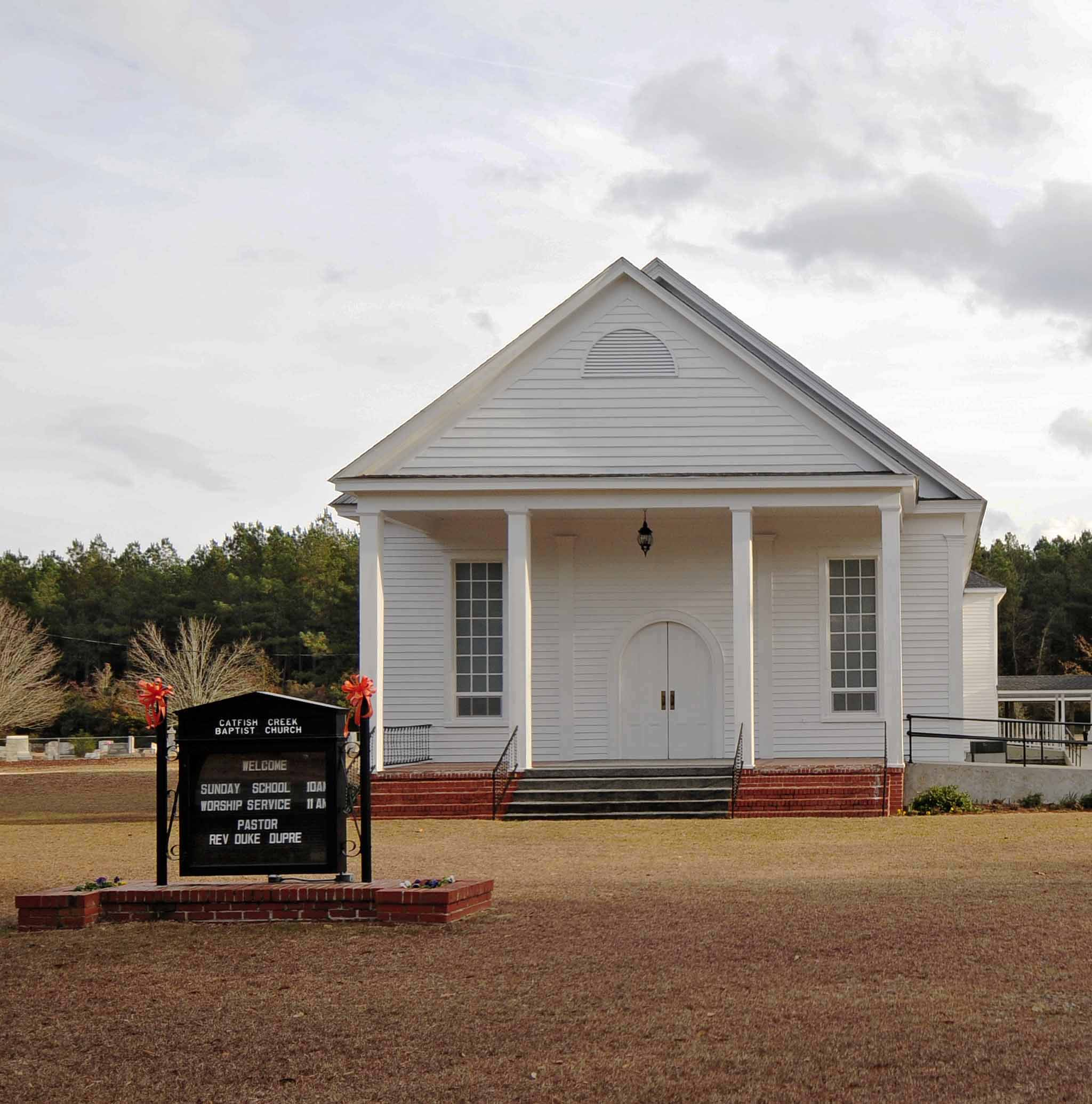

- Location within South Carolina Location within the United States
- Location: 5 miles northwest of Latta at the junction of County Roads 1741 and 1763, near Latta, South Carolina
- Coordinates: 34°21′55″N 79°29′36″W
- Area: 5 acres (2.0 ha)
- Built: 1883
- NRHP reference No.: 75001697
- Added to NRHP: January 17, 1975

Catfish Creek Baptist Church is a historic Southern Baptist church located near Latta, Dillon County, South Carolina. It was built in 1883, and is a pine structure measuring 60 feet long and 40 feet wide. The front façade features brick steps and brick pedimented portico with four supporting columns added in 1970. It is the oldest church congregation in Dillon County, dating to 1802.

It was added to the National Register of Historic Places in 1975.
