= Dillon County Courthouse =

- U.S. National Register of Historic Places
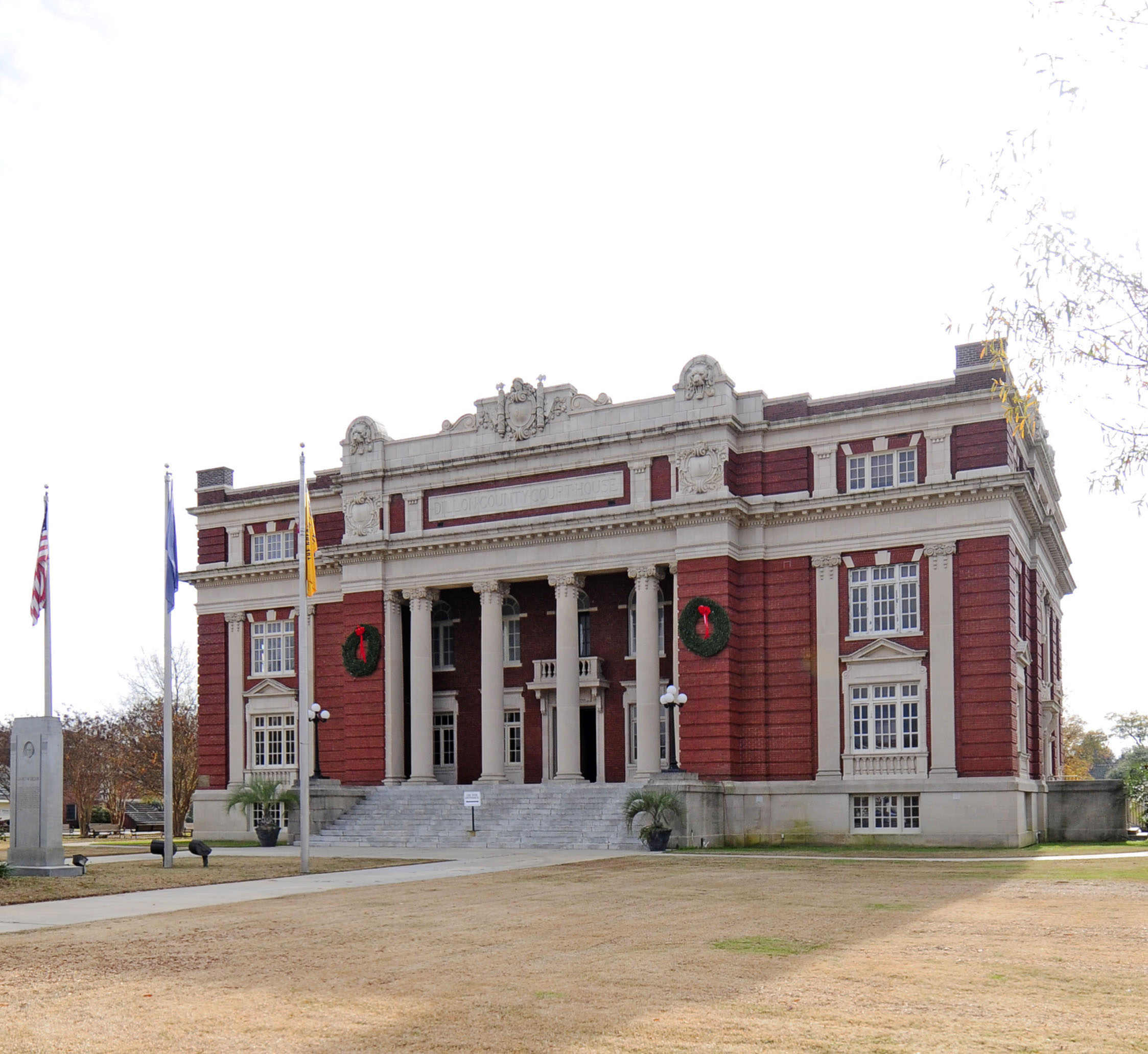

- Location within South Carolina Location within the United States
- Interactive map showing the location of Dillon County Courthouse
- Location: Dillon, South Carolina
- Coordinates: 34°25′5″N 79°22′32″W
- Built: 1911
- Built by: J. A. Jones
- Architect: William Augustus Edwards
- Architectural style: Classical Revival
- MPS: Courthouses in South Carolina Designed by William Augustus Edwards TR
- NRHP reference No.: 81000564
- Added to NRHP: October 30, 1981

The Dillon County Courthouse, built in 1911, is a historic courthouse located at 301 West Main Street in the city of Dillon in Dillon County, South Carolina. It was designed in the Classical Revival style by Darlington native William Augustus Edwards who designed eight other South Carolina courthouses as well as academic buildings at 12 institutions in Florida, Georgia and South Carolina. Dillon County was created in 1910 and this is the only courthouse it has ever had. On October 30, 1981, it was added to the National Register of Historic Places. It is located in the Dillon Downtown Historic District.

== See also ==
- List of Registered Historic Places in South Carolina
