= Frederick Apartments (Charlotte, North Carolina) =

Historic building in North Carolina, US

- U.S. National Register of Historic Places
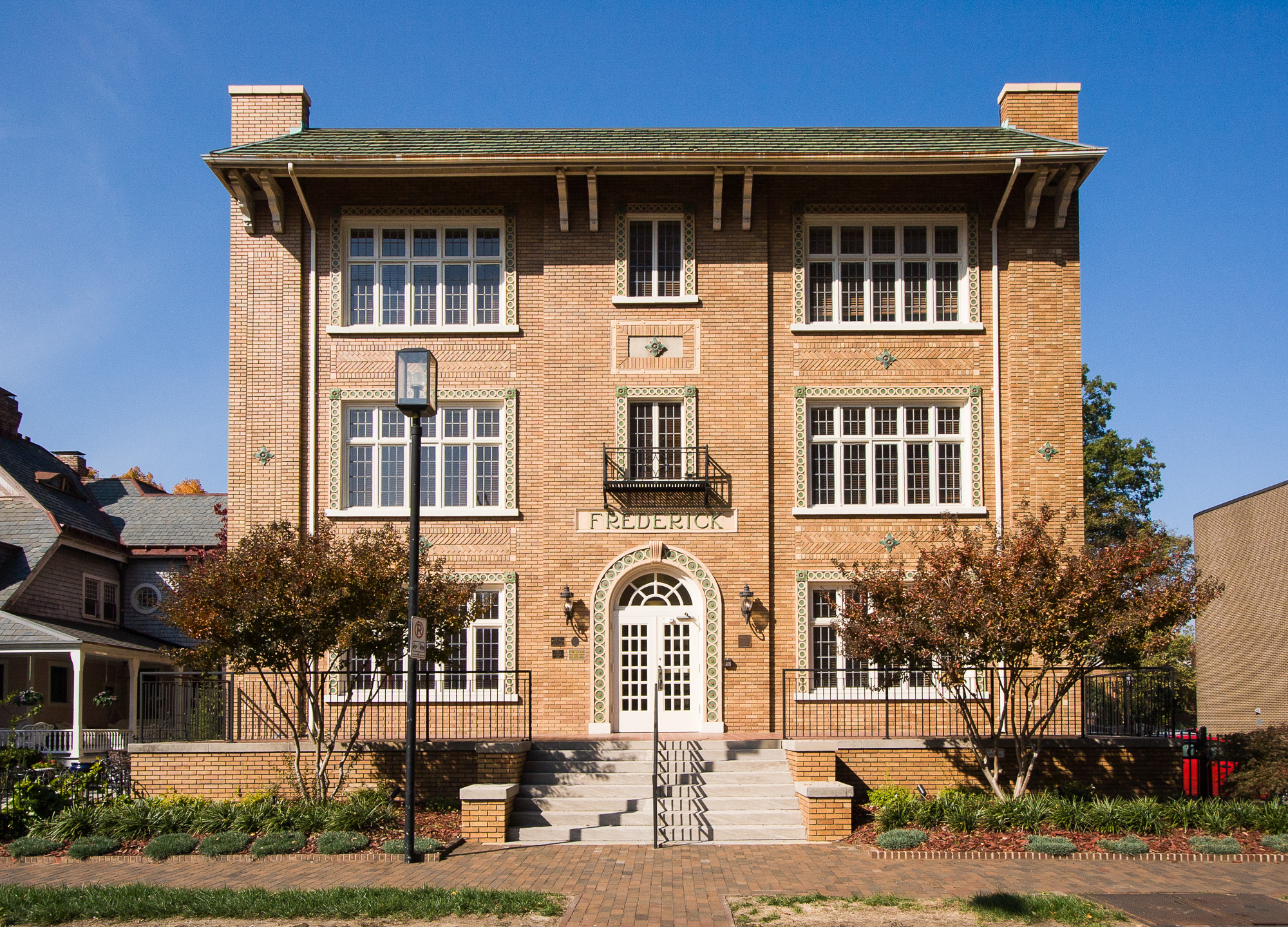
- Frederick Apartments, November 2007

- Location within North Carolina Location within the United States
- Location: 515 N. Church St., Charlotte, North Carolina
- Coordinates: 35°13′54.087″N 80°50′21.6774″W
- Area: 0.5 acres (0.20 ha)
- Built by: J.A. Jones Construction Company
- Architectural style: Italian Renaissance Revival
- NRHP reference No.: 01000341
- Added to NRHP: April 5, 2001

The Frederick Apartments is a historic apartment building located in Charlotte, Mecklenburg County, North Carolina. It was built in 1927, and is a three-story, 36-unit brick apartment house in the Italian Renaissance Revival style. The body of the building is constructed of red brick, laid up in common bond. The facade features buff-colored brick set in stretcher bond with decorative patterning in places.

It was added to the National Register of Historic Places in 2001.
