= Bingham, South Carolina =

Coordinates: 34°26′07″N 79°32′35″W

Bingham was a historical community in Dillon County, South Carolina, in operation 1892 to 1941.

Selkirk Farm was listed on the National Register of Historic Places in 1974.

== Sources ==
- Stokes, Durward T. The History of Dillon County, South Carolina. Columbia, S.C.: University of South Carolina Press, 1978. p460
- Bingham, South Carolina. Geographic Names Information System, U.S. Geological Survey.
