= John Hayes Farmstead =

- U.S. National Register of Historic Places
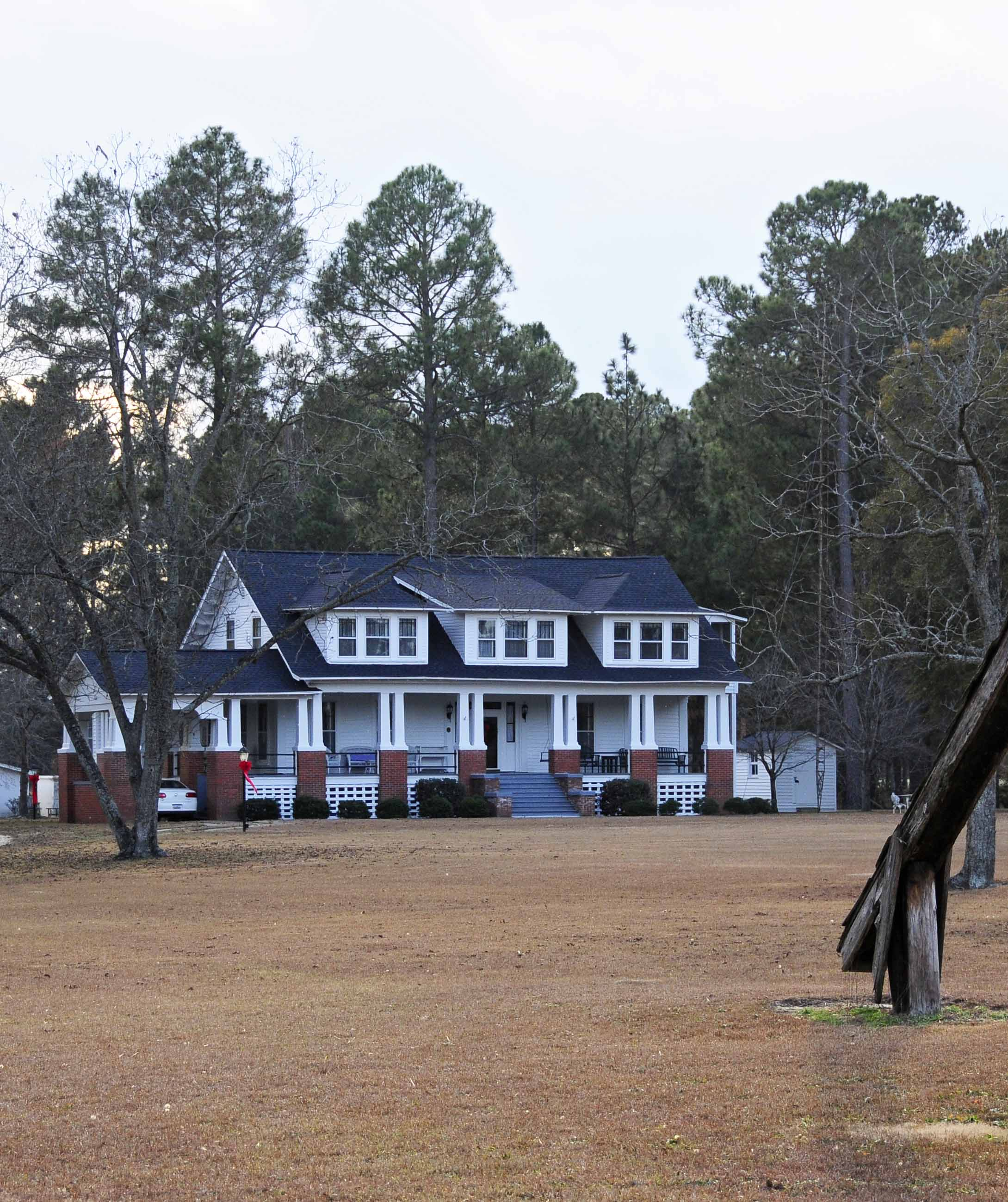
- John Hayes Farmstead, December 2012

- Location within South Carolina Location within the United States
- Location: 1251 South Carolina Highway 38, W., near Latta, South Carolina
- Coordinates: 34°20′14″N 79°31′29″W
- Area: 7.8 acres (3.2 ha)
- Built: 1791, 1915
- Architectural style: Bungalow/craftsman
- NRHP reference No.: 05001153
- Added to NRHP: October 4, 2005

John Hayes Farmstead, also known as Cotton Press Farm and John Hayes House, is a historic home and farm located near Latta, Dillon County, South Carolina. The main house was built in 1791, later extensively renovated and expanded as an American Craftsman / Bungalow house in 1915. It is still a working farm, producing tobacco, corn, grains, and soybeans, and in 1988 was recognized by the U.S. Department of Agriculture as a Bicentennial Farm. Also on the property are a sweet potato curing house, three barns, smokehouse, wash house, and pump house.

It was listed on the National Register of Historic Places in 2005.
