= Latta Historic District No. 1 =

Historic district in South Carolina, United States

- U.S. National Register of Historic Places
- U.S. Historic district
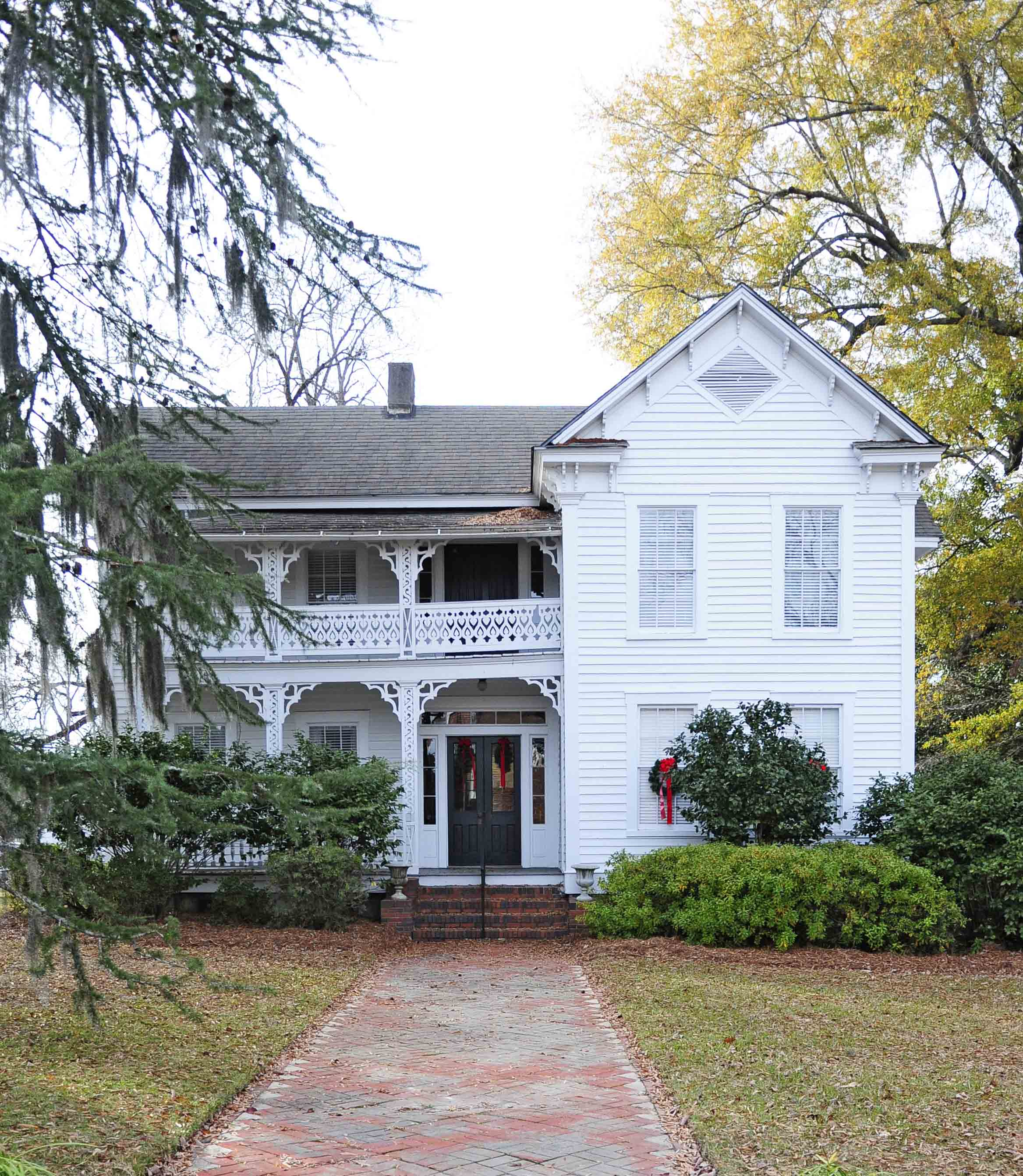
- Edwards House, Latta Historic District 1, December 2012

- Location within South Carolina Location within the United States
- Location: Church, Marion, Bethea, Rice, Dew, Mauldin, and Main Sts., Latta, South Carolina
- Coordinates: 34°20′25″N 79°26′03″W
- Area: 39 acres (16 ha)
- Built: 1930
- Architectural style: Classical Revival, Bungalow/craftsman, Late Victorian
- MPS: Latta MRA
- NRHP reference No.: 84002038
- Added to NRHP: May 17, 1984

Latta Historic District No. 1 is a national historic district located at Latta, Dillon County, South Carolina. The district encompasses 47 contributing buildings in a primarily residential section of Latta. The buildings were erected between about 1890 and 1930. The houses are mostly one- to two-story frame residences with late Victorian era details. In addition, the district has examples of local usage of neo-classical details and more sophisticated examples of the Neo-Classical style. Early 20th century bungalows illustrate the development of the area during the early century. The district also contains the Latta Public Library, the Latta Methodist Church, the Latta Baptist Church, and a few commercial buildings, most notably the Fairey Agency and Dr. L.H. Edwards dentist office.

It was listed on the National Register of Historic Places in 1984.
