= Hamer Hall (Hamer, South Carolina) =

Historic house in South Carolina, United States

- U.S. National Register of Historic Places
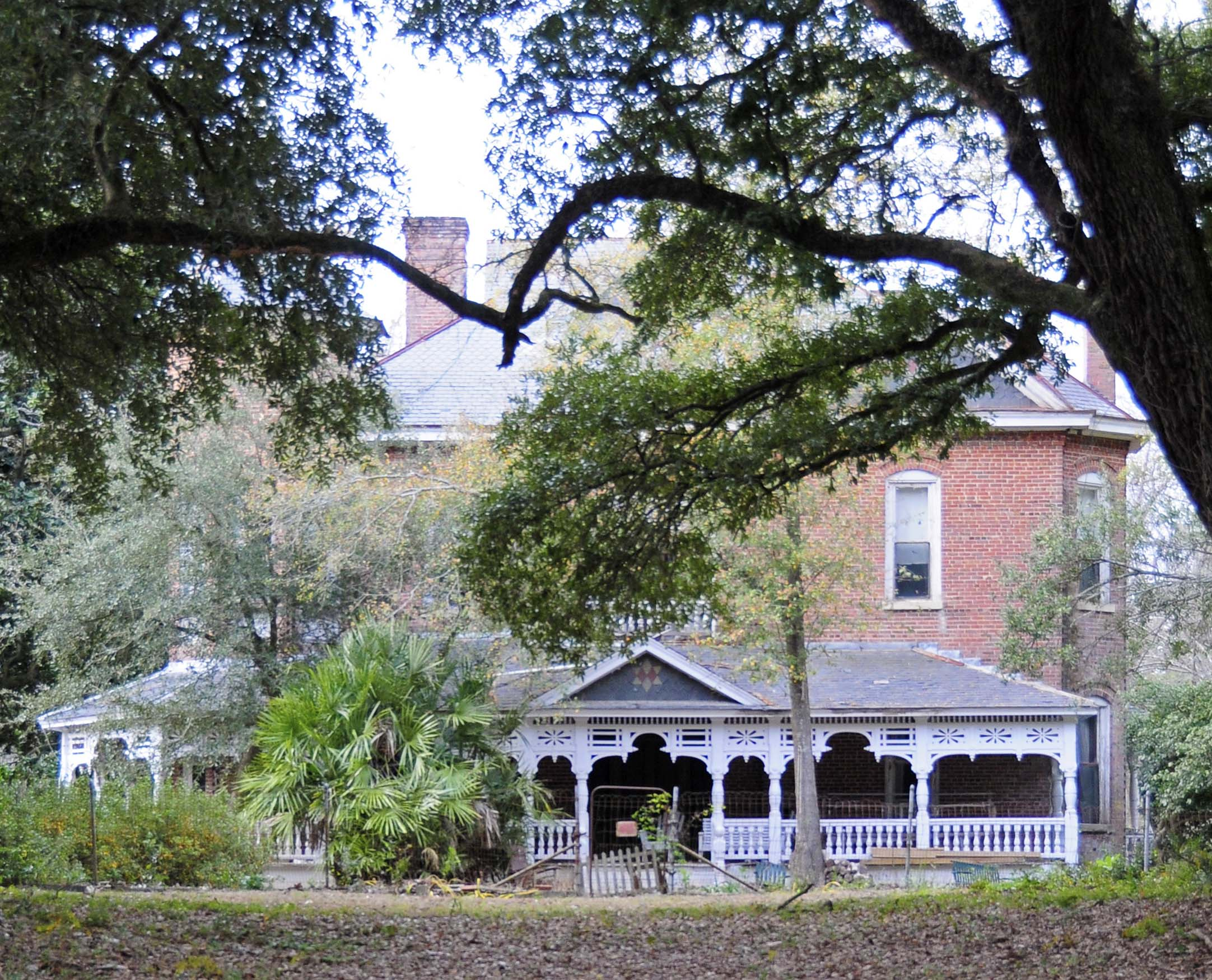

- Location within South Carolina Location within the United States
- Location: North of Hamer on U.S. Route 301, Hamer, South Carolina
- Coordinates: 34°29′11″N 79°19′35″W
- Area: 8.5 acres (3.4 ha)
- Built: 1890
- Architectural style: Late Victorian
- NRHP reference No.: 75001696
- Added to NRHP: May 30, 1975

Hamer Hall is a historic home located near Hamer, Dillon County, South Carolina. It was built about 1890, and is a two-story, brick dwelling in the Late Victorian style. The house contains 14 rooms and has three large porches. It has a corner turret and the roof is a combination of hipped and gable modes. The front facade features a one-story piazza with very elaborate ornamentation fashioned with chisel, gouge and lathe. Also on the property are three barns, a windmill, and a water tank.

It was listed on the U.S. National Register of Historic Places in 1975.
