= Latta Downtown Historic District =

Historic district in South Carolina, United States

- U.S. National Register of Historic Places
- U.S. Historic district
- Location within South Carolina Location within the United States
- Location: Roughly along E. and W. Main Sts., Latta, South Carolina
- Coordinates: 34°20′15″N 79°25′57″W
- Area: 4 acres (1.6 ha)
- Architectural style: Late 19th And Early 20th Century American Movements
- MPS: Latta MRA
- NRHP reference No.: 98000555
- Added to NRHP: May 20, 1998

Latta Downtown Historic District is a national historic district located at Latta, Dillon County, South Carolina. The district encompasses 13 contributing buildings in the central business district of Latta. The buildings were erected between about 1895 and 1928. They include buildings that housed a variety of mercantile establishments such as grocery stores, drugstores, a hotel, two banks, and several dry goods stores concentrated in a block east of the railroad on Main Street. Notable buildings include the Parham Building, McMillan Building, Cox Building, and Kornblut's Department Store.

It was listed on the National Register of Historic Places in 1998.
