= Latta, South Carolina =

- Town
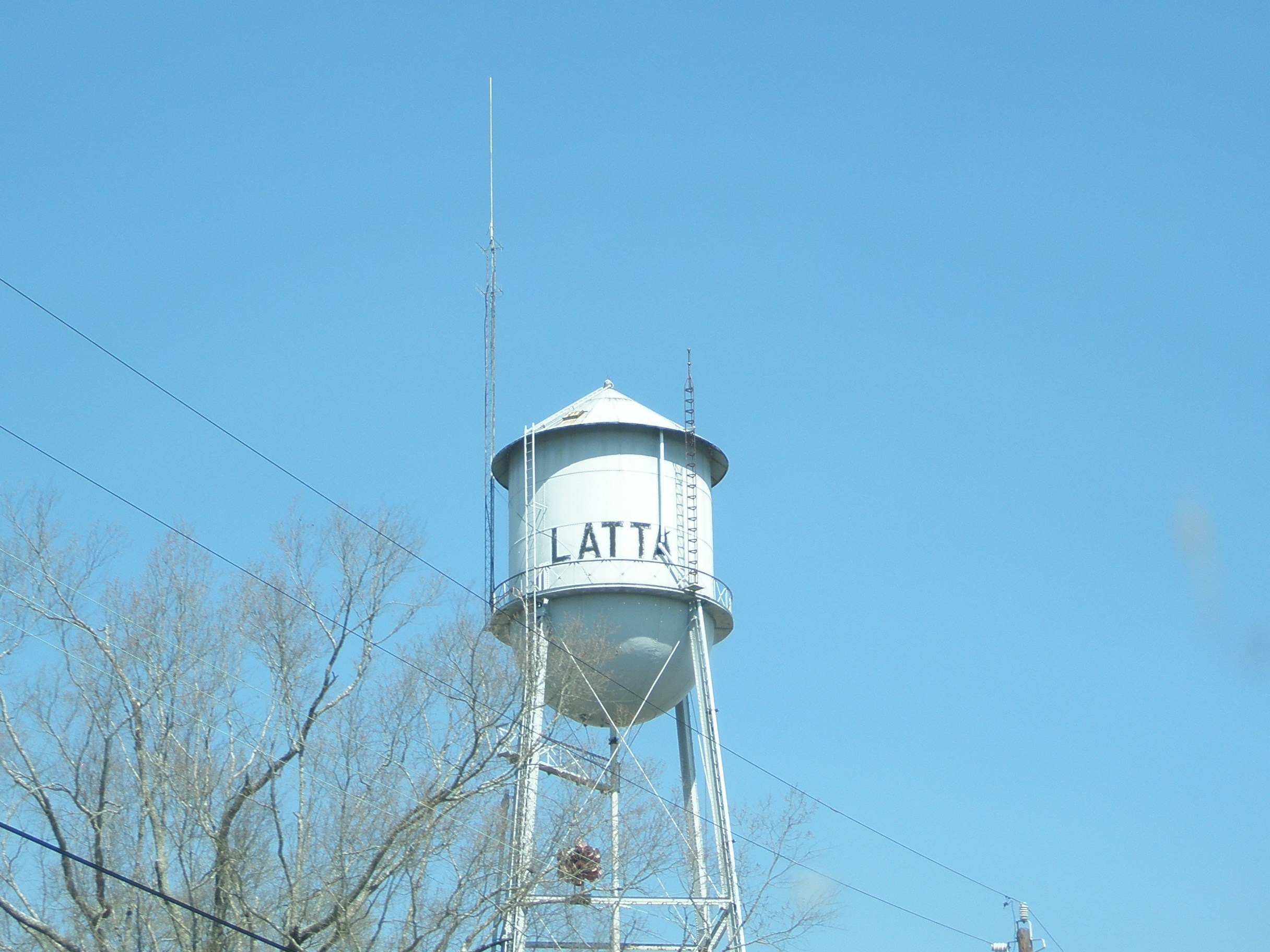
- Latta water tower

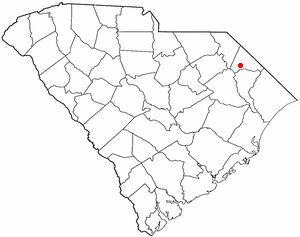
- Location of Latta within South Carolina
- Coordinates: 34°20′18″N 79°25′59″W
- Country: United States
- State: South Carolina
- County: Dillon
- Settled: c. 1887
- Incorporated: March 1890
- Named for: Captain Robert Latta

Government
  - Type: Mayor–council government
  - Mayor: Marcus McGirt

Area
  - Total: 1.10 sq mi (2.84 km^{2})
  - Land: 1.10 sq mi (2.84 km^{2})
  - Water: 0 sq mi (0.00 km^{2})
- Elevation: 102 ft (31 m)

Population (2020)
  - Total: 1,296
  - Density: 1,182.7/sq mi (456.66/km^{2})
- Time zone: UTC-5 (EST)
  - Summer (DST): UTC-4 (EDT)
- ZIP code: 29565
- Area codes: 843, 854
- FIPS code: 45-40480
- GNIS feature ID: 2405989
- Website: townoflatta.sc.gov

Latta is a town in Dillon County, South Carolina, United States. Latta is the second most populous town in Dillon County. As of the 2020 census, Latta had a population of 1,296.

== History ==
Latta was established in 1887. The town arose from a need for a railroad, which helped to eliminate "the need to travel to Wilmington, North Carolina, in order to reach many points in South Carolina." Thus, the Atlantic Coast Line Railroad built two depots; one in the city of Dillon and the other 7 miles (11 km) to the south in Latta. The depots were completed in 1888. Many families were drawn to this area, and in March 1890, "the town of Latta was incorporated by the state legislature and received its charter."

The town was named for the Latta family of settlers. More specifically, it was named after Captain Robert Latta, who was from York County, South Carolina; he orchestrated the engineering for the Atlantic Coast Line Railroad. Captain Latta not only surveyed the area for the railroad, but he also constructed the original plans for the town of Latta. Because of Latta's railroad facilities, the town grew rapidly, especially from 1900 to 1910.

Latta has an established historic district, mostly located on Main Street, and many of these structures are listed in the National Register of Historic Places. Latta has about 55 properties, constructed between ca. 1890 and ca. 1930, that are a part of the historic district. Latta is home to one of the 13 Carnegie public library buildings in South Carolina. The Latta library opened in 1914 and is "one of five of South Carolina's original 14 Carnegie libraries still in use as a library." The post office in Latta has been in operation since 1888.

In April 2014, Mayor Earl Bullard fired Police Chief Crystal Moore, allegedly because Moore is lesbian. Bullard said on the telephone, "I would much rather have — and I will say this to anybody's face — somebody who drank and drank too much taking care of my child than I had somebody whose lifestyle is questionable around children. … I'm not going to let two women stand up there and hold hands and let my child be aware of it. And I'm not going to see them do it with two men neither."

In June 2014, Latta residents voted in favor of changing from a "strong mayor" government to a "strong council" government, which allowed the town council to reinstate Crystal Moore as Latta's police chief, which they did unanimously on June 28, 2014.

=== Registered historic sites ===
The following are listed on the National Register of Historic Places: Joel Allen House, Catfish Creek Baptist Church, Early Cotton Press, John Hayes Farmstead, Latta Downtown Historic District, Latta Historic District No. 1, Latta Historic District No. 2, McMillan House, and Old Ebenezer Church.

== Geography ==
Latta is located in southern Dillon County. U.S. Routes 301 and 501 pass through the center of town as Second Avenue, leading northeast 6 miles (10 km) to Dillon, the county seat. US 501 leads south 12 miles (19 km) to Marion, while US 301 diverges from US 501 south of town and leads southwest 24 miles (39 km) to Florence. South Carolina Highway 917 is Main Street in Latta, leading west 6 miles (10 km) to Interstate 95 at Exit 181, and southeast 15 miles (24 km) to Mullins.

According to the United States Census Bureau, the town has a total area of 1.1 square miles (2.8 km^{2}), all land.

== Demographics ==
Historical population
| Census | Pop. | Note | %± |
|---|---|---|---|
| 1900 | 453 | | — |
| 1910 | 1,358 | | 199.8% |
| 1920 | 1,079 | | −20.5% |
| 1930 | 1,166 | | 8.1% |
| 1940 | 1,334 | | 14.4% |
| 1950 | 1,602 | | 20.1% |
| 1960 | 1,901 | | 18.7% |
| 1970 | 1,764 | | −7.2% |
| 1980 | 1,804 | | 2.3% |
| 1990 | 1,565 | | −13.2% |
| 2000 | 1,410 | | −9.9% |
| 2010 | 1,379 | | −2.2% |
| 2020 | 1,296 | | −6.0% |
U.S. Decennial Census

As of the census of 2000, there were 1,410 people, 580 households, and 399 families residing in the town. The population density was 1,358.9 inhabitants per square mile (524.7/km^{2}). There were 665 housing units at an average density of 640.9 per square mile (247.5/km^{2}). The racial makeup of the town was 57.94% White, 40.50% African American, 0.71% Native American, 0.07% from other races, and 0.78% from two or more races. Hispanic or Latino people of any race were 0.64% of the population.

There were 580 households, out of which 25.9% had children under the age of 18 living with them, 43.6% were married couples living together, 21.4% had a female householder with no husband present, and 31.2% were non-families. 29.7% of all households were made up of individuals, and 15.7% had someone living alone who was 65 years of age or older. The average household size was 2.43 and the average family size was 3.01.

In the town, the population was spread out, with 24.0% under the age of 18, 8.9% from 18 to 24, 23.8% from 25 to 44, 25.2% from 45 to 64, and 18.2% who were 65 years of age or older. The median age was 41 years. For every 100 females, there were 74.7 males. For every 100 females age 18 and over, there were 68.3 males. The median income for a household in the town was $25,833, and the median income for a family was $36,406. Males had a median income of $30,714 versus $19,583 for females. The per capita income for the town was $17,451. About 16.5% of families and 21.2% of the population were below the poverty line, including 24.9% of those under age 18 and 31.4% of those age 65 or over.

== Education ==
Public education in Latta is administered by Latta School District. The district operates Latta Elementary School, Latta Middle School and Latta High School.

Latta has a public library, a branch of the Dillon County Library.

== Notable people ==
- Chuck Brown, comic book creator
- Raymond Felton (born 1984), National Basketball Association point guard
- Carlisle Floyd (1926–2021), opera composer
- Kathryn Frost (1948–2006), major general, United States Army
- Chuck Jackson (1937–2023), R&B and soul singer and recording artist
- John L. McLucas (1920–2002), United States Secretary of the Air Force
- Norm McMillan (1895–1969), Major League Baseball shortstop, mostly with the Chicago Cubs
- Leroy Stanton (1946–2019), professional baseball player for numerous teams
