= Latta Historic District No. 2 =

Historic district in South Carolina, United States

- U.S. National Register of Historic Places
- U.S. Historic district
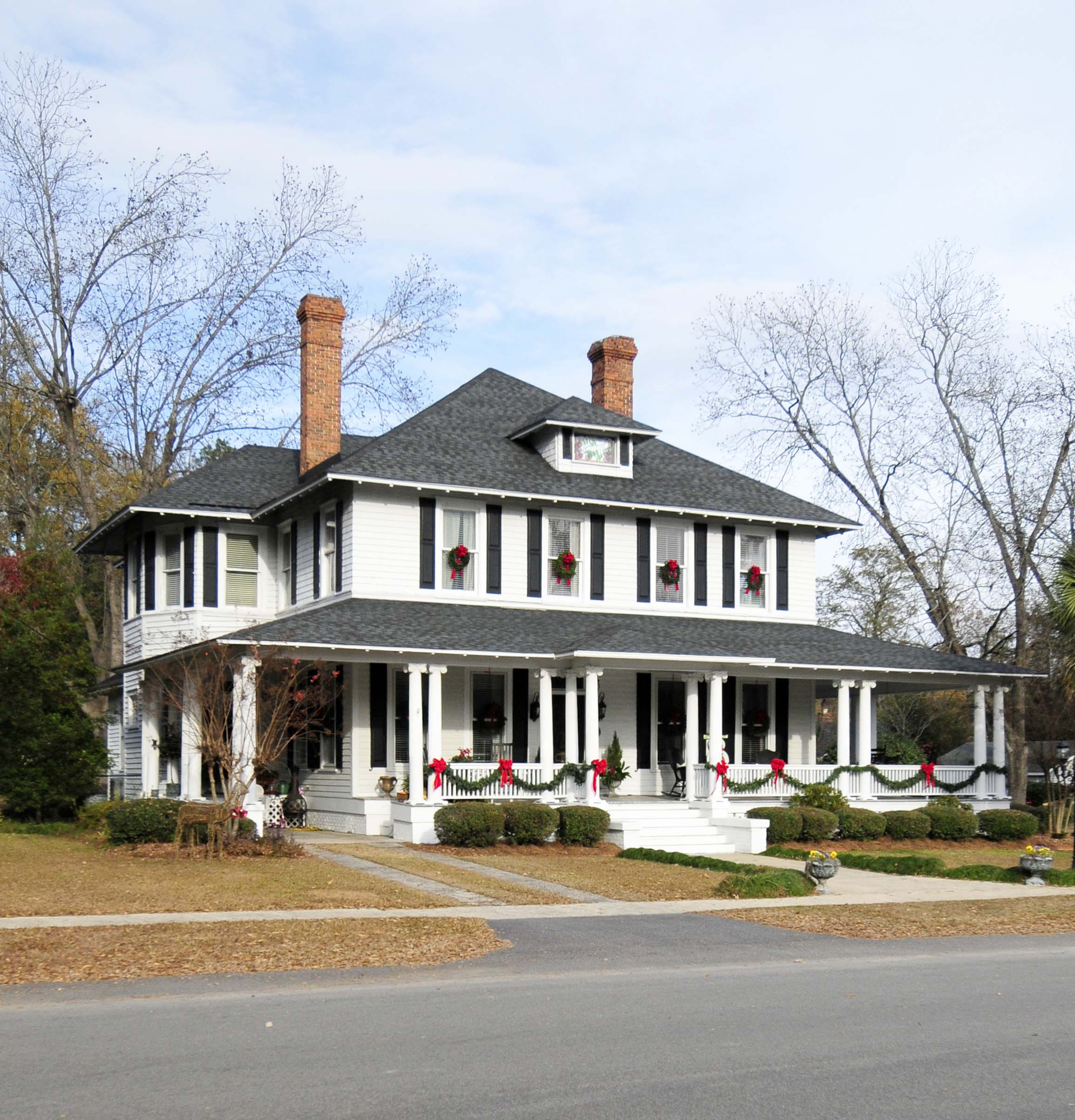
- 205 Bamberg Street, Latta Historic District 2, December 2012

- Location within South Carolina Location within the United States
- Location: Richardson St., Bamberg to Oak Sts., Latta, South Carolina
- Coordinates: 34°20′19″N 79°25′50″W
- Area: 8 acres (3.2 ha)
- Built: 1930
- Architectural style: Bungalow/craftsman, Late Victorian
- MPS: Latta MRA
- NRHP reference No.: 84002040
- Added to NRHP: May 17, 1984

Latta Historic District No. 2 is a national historic district located at Latta, Dillon County, South Carolina. The district encompasses 11 contributing buildings in a primarily residential section of Latta. The buildings were erected between about 1890 and 1930, and include residences and a church. The residences are mostly one- and two-story, frame buildings with either late Victorian era details or bungalow styling. Also included is the Latta Presbyterian Church, a small frame church with Gothic Revival details.

It was listed on the National Register of Historic Places in 1984.
