= Cotton Press (Latta, South Carolina) =

- Early Cotton Press
- U.S. National Register of Historic Places
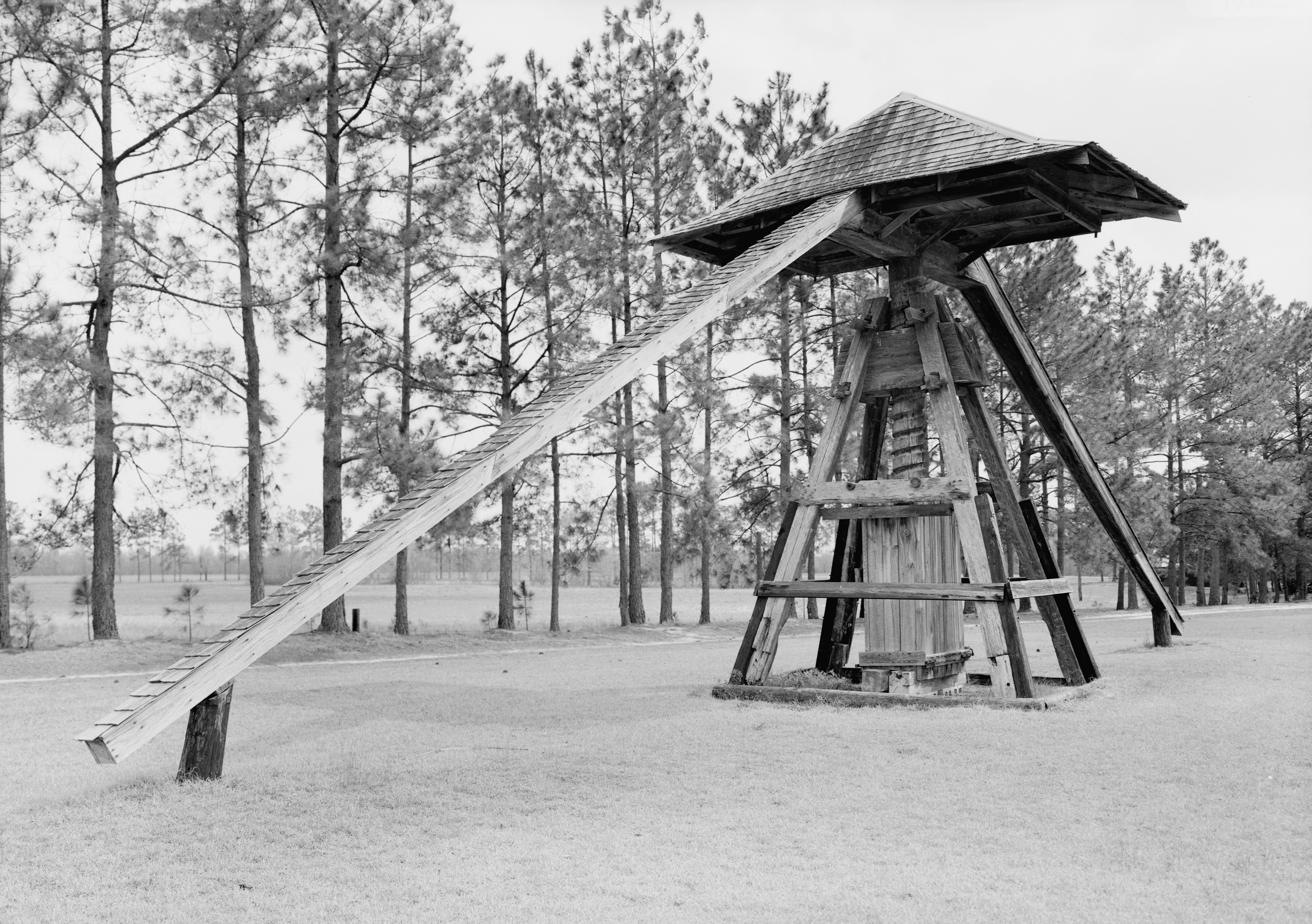
- Latta cotton press in 1987

- Location within South Carolina Location within the United States
- Nearest city: Latta, South Carolina
- Coordinates: 34°20′16″N 79°31′26″W
- Built: 1798
- Architect: Berry, Stephen
- Architectural style: Early Cotton Press
- NRHP reference No.: 72001206
- Added to NRHP: November 15, 1972

The Latta Cotton Press is an early mule-powered, wooden cotton press built around 1798. It was built and operated at Berry's Crossroad on South Carolina Highway 38 south of Latta in Dillon County, South Carolina. It was moved about 2.5 mi (4 km) west around 1950. It was listed on the National Register of Historic Places on November 15, 1972.

== History ==
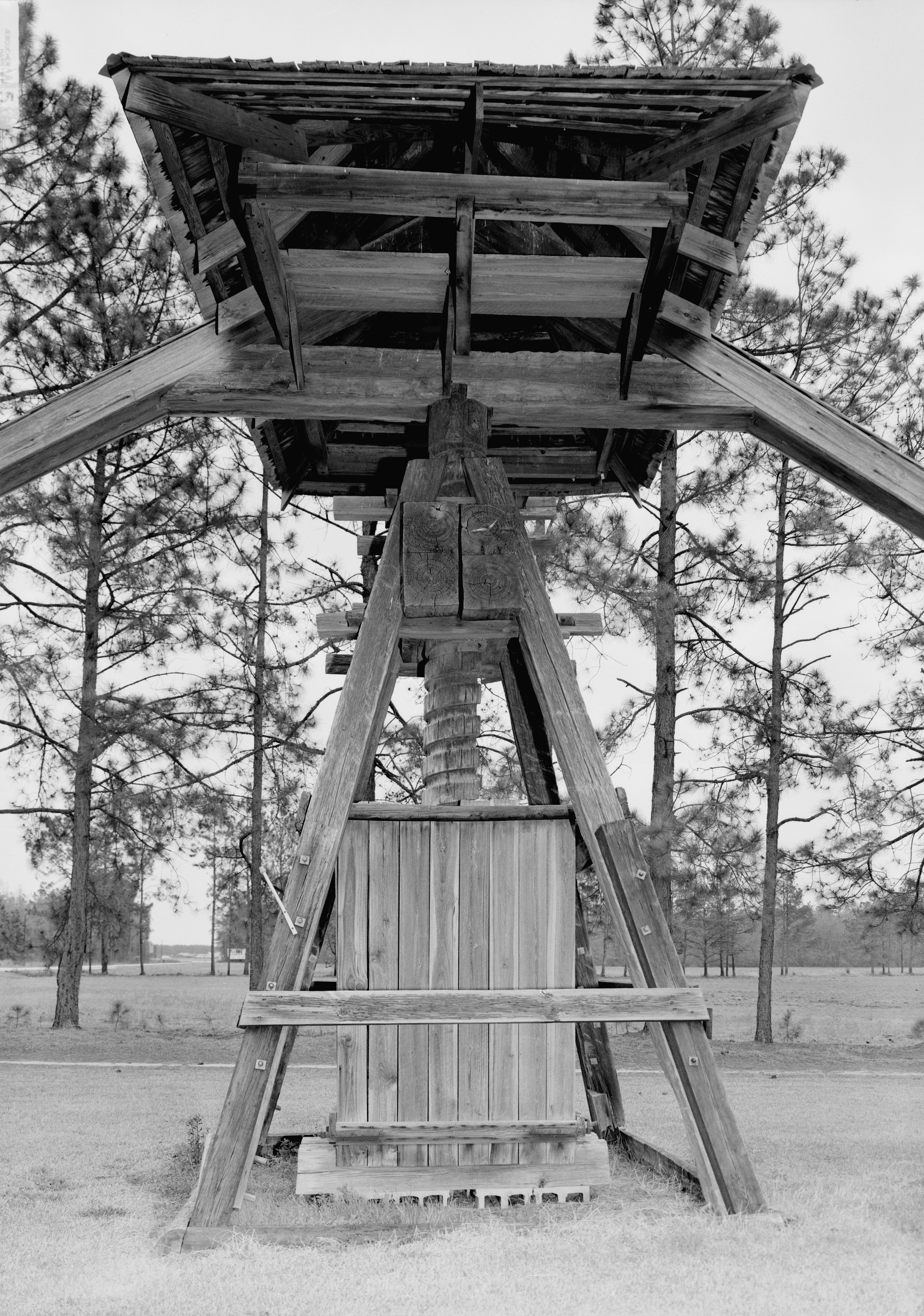
Detail of the Latta cotton press

The cotton press was built around 1798 for baling ginned cotton. It is constructed of pegged and doweled oak. It has a 16 in (406 mm) diameter oak screw that was hand chiseled. Turning the screw compressed cotton into a wooden frame to form a bale. The press has a small rectangular, shingled hip roof to protect the machinery from the weather. Four beams forming a pyramidal frame support the screw. Two long shingled booms that are hinged to the screw extend out from the machine. These booms or poles have been called "buzzard wings." Mules or oxen were used to rotate the screw. The cotton press was either built by or for Stephen Berry or "Buck Swamp" John Bethea.

In 1950, it was moved from Berry's Crossroad to private property on the south side of South Carolina Highway 38 about 0.5 mi (0.8 km) west of its intersection of South Carolina Highway 917 and can be viewed from the roadside.

Except for minor repairs at its base and roof, the cotton press is constructed of original materials. In 1961, the press was considered to be in excellent condition and an excellent example of handmade craftsmanship. It is the only cotton press of this era in South Carolina. There is a similar wooden cotton press on the Town Common in Tarboro, North Carolina. Another antebellum cotton press without the buzzard wings poles is at Magnolia Plantation near Derry, Louisiana. This press has a fixed screw and its base is rotated to compress the cotton.

There are additional pictures of the cotton press taken for the Historic American Engineering Record.
