= 2020 United States presidential election in South Carolina =

- November 3, 2020
- Turnout: 72.1% (▲4.24 pp)

Nominee	Donald Trump	Joe Biden
Party	Republican	Democratic
Home state	Florida	Delaware
Running mate	Mike Pence	Kamala Harris
Electoral vote	9	0
Popular vote	1,385,103	1,091,541
Percentage	55.11%	43.43%

Trump
40–50%
50–60%
60–70%
70–80%
80–90%
90–100%
Biden
40–50%
50–60%
60–70%
70–80%
80–90%
90–100%
Tie/No Data
President before election
Donald Trump
Republican
Elected President
Joe Biden
Democratic

The 2020 United States presidential election in South Carolina was held on Tuesday, November 3, 2020, as part of the 2020 United States presidential election in which all 50 states plus the District of Columbia participated. South Carolina voters chose electors to represent them in the Electoral College via a popular vote, pitting the Republican nominee, incumbent President Donald Trump, and running mate Vice President Mike Pence against Democratic nominee, former Vice President Joe Biden, and his running mate California Senator Kamala Harris. South Carolina has nine electoral votes in the Electoral College.

Trump carried South Carolina by a margin of 11.68%, down from his 14.27% margin four years earlier. Prior to this election, all 12 news organizations considered this a state Trump would win, or a red state.

South Carolina was the only East Coast state in 2020 to vote Republican by a double-digit margin. This was the first time that both main party candidates won more than one million votes in a statewide election in South Carolina, alongside the concurrent Senate election.

== Primary elections ==
=== Canceled Republican primary ===
On September 7, 2019, the South Carolina Republican Party became one of several state GOP affiliates to cancel their respective primaries and caucuses officially. Donald J. Trump's re-election campaign and Republican officials have cited the fact that Republicans canceled several state primaries when George H. W. Bush and George W. Bush sought second terms in 1992 and 2004, respectively, and Democrats scrapped some of their primaries when Bill Clinton and Barack Obama were seeking re-election in 1996 and 2012, respectively.

In response to the cancellation, former U.S. Representative Bob Inglis and another South Carolina Republican voter filed a lawsuit against the South Carolina Republican Party on grounds that it denied their right to vote. On December 11, 2019, a state court judge dismissed the lawsuit, writing in his opinion that the law "does not give plaintiffs a legal right to presidential preference primary". Thus at the South Carolina State Republican Convention in May 2020, the state party formally bound all 50 of its national pledged delegates to Trump.

=== Democratic primary ===
The South Carolina Democratic primary was held on February 29, 2020.

Popular vote share by county
Biden—30–40%
Biden—40–50%
Biden—50–60%
Biden—60–70%
Biden—70–80%

Popular vote share by congressional district
Biden—30–40%
Biden—40–50%
Biden—50–60%
Biden—60–70%

Official results show that Joe Biden won the Democratic primary with 48.65% of the vote, with Bernie Sanders coming in second with 19.77%.

2020 South Carolina Democratic presidential primary
Candidate	Votes	%	Delegates
Joe Biden	262,336	48.65	39
Bernie Sanders	106,605	19.77	15
Tom Steyer	61,140	11.34	
Pete Buttigieg	44,217	8.20	
Elizabeth Warren	38,120	7.07	
Amy Klobuchar	16,900	3.13	
Tulsi Gabbard	6,813	1.26	
Andrew Yang (withdrawn)	1,069	0.20	
Michael Bennet (withdrawn)	765	0.14	
Cory Booker (withdrawn)	658	0.12	
John Delaney (withdrawn)	352	0.07	
Deval Patrick (withdrawn)	288	0.05	
Total	539,263	100%	54

== General election ==
=== Predictions ===
Source	Ranking	As of
The Cook Political Report	Likely R	September 10, 2020
Inside Elections	Likely R	September 4, 2020
Sabato's Crystal Ball	Likely R	July 14, 2020
Politico	Safe R	September 8, 2020
RCP	Lean R	August 3, 2020
Niskanen	Safe R	July 26, 2020
CNN	Safe R	August 3, 2020
The Economist	Likely R	September 2, 2020
CBS News	Likely R	August 16, 2020
270towin	Likely R	August 2, 2020
ABC News	Safe R	July 31, 2020
NPR	Likely R	August 3, 2020
NBC News	Likely R	August 6, 2020
538	Likely R	September 9, 2020

=== Polling ===
View source data.

Aggregate polls

Source of poll aggregation	Dates administered	Dates updated	Joe Biden Democratic	Donald Trump Republican	Other/ Undecided (Note: Calculated by taking the difference of 100% and all other candidates combined.)	Margin
270 to Win	October 15, 2020 – November 2, 2020	November 3, 2020	43.3%	50.3%	6.4%	Trump +7.0
FiveThirtyEight	until November 2, 2020	November 3, 2020	44.5%	51.6%	3.9%	Trump +7.1
Average			43.9%	51.0%	5.1%	Trump +7.1

Polls

Poll source	Date(s) administered	Sample size (Note: Key: A – all adults RV – registered voters LV – likely voters V – unclear)	Margin of error	Donald Trump Republican	Joe Biden Democratic	Jo Jorgensen Libertarian	Howie Hawkins Green	Other	Undecided
Optimus	Oct 31 – Nov 2, 2020	817 (LV)	± 3.9%	51%	39%	–	–	2% (Note: "Refused" and "Third party candidate" with 1%)	8%
SurveyMonkey/Axios	Oct 20 – Nov 2, 2020	2,485 (LV)	± 3%	56% (Note: Overlapping sample with the previous SurveyMonkey/Axios poll, but more information available regarding sample size)	42%	–	–	–	–
Data For Progress	Oct 27 – Nov 1, 2020	1,121 (LV)	± 2.9%	53%	44%	2%	0%	0% (Note: "Other candidate/write-in" with 0%)	–
Swayable	Oct 23 – Nov 1, 2020	426 (LV)	± 7.4%	50%	49%	1%	0%	–	–
Morning Consult	Oct 22–31, 2020	904 (LV)	± 3%	51%	45%	–	–	–	–
SurveyMonkey/Axios	Oct 1–28, 2020	4,725 (LV)	–	54%	44%	–	–	–	–
Data for Progress	Oct 22–27, 2020	1,196 (LV)	± 2.8%	50%	44%	1%	0%	–	4%
Starboard Communications	Oct 26, 2020	800 (LV)	–	51%	44%	–	–	–	5%
East Carolina University	Oct 24–25, 2020	763 (LV)	± 4.1%	52%	44%	–	–	3% (Note: "Refused" with 2%; "Some other candidate" with 1%; Did/would not vote with 0%)	1%
Morning Consult	Oct 11–20, 2020	926 (LV)	± 3.2%	51%	45%	–	–	–	–
New York Times/Siena College	Oct 9–14, 2020	605 (LV)	± 4.5%	49%	41%	2%	1%	1% (Note: would not vote with 1%; "Someone else" with 0%)	6% (Note: Includes "Refused")
Data for Progress	Oct 8–11, 2020	801 (LV)	± 3.5%	52%	43%	1%	1%	–	4%
Morning Consult	Oct 2–11, 2020	903 (LV)	± 3%	54%	42%	–	–	–	–
SurveyMonkey/Axios	Sep 1–30, 2020	1,833 (LV)	–	53%	45%	–	–	–	2%
GBAO Strategies/DSCC (Note: The DSCC endorsed Jaime Harrison's campaign for the 2020 US Senate election in South Carolina before this poll's sampling period)	Sep 24–28, 2020	800 (LV)	± 3.5%	49%	44%	–	–	–	–
Data for Progress (D)	Sep 23–28, 2020	824 (LV)	± 3.4%	47% (Note: Standard VI response)	43%	1%	1%	–	8%
Data for Progress (D)	Sep 23–28, 2020	824 (LV)	± 3.4%	50% (Note: If the only candidates were Biden and Trump)	45%	–	–	–	5%
Quinnipiac University	Sep 23–27, 2020	1,123 (LV)	± 2.9%	48%	47%	–	–	1% (Note: "Someone else" with 1%)	4%
YouGov/CBS	Sep 22–25, 2020	1,080 (LV)	± 3.8%	52%	42%	–	–	2% (Note: "Someone else/third party" with 2%)	4%
Morning Consult	Sep 11–20, 2020	764 (LV)	± (3% – 4%)	50% (Note: Overlapping sample with the previous Morning Consult poll, but more information available regarding sample size)	44%	–	–	–	–
Quinnipiac University	Sep 10–14, 2020	969 (LV)	± 3.2%	51%	45%	–	–	0% (Note: "Someone else" with 0%)	4%
Morning Consult	Sep 2–11, 2020	~764 (LV)	± (3%–4%)	51%	44%	–	–	–	–
Morning Consult	Aug 23 – Sep 1, 2020	~764 (LV)	± (3%–4%)	52%	42%	–	–	–	–
SurveyMonkey/Axios	Aug 1–31, 2020	1,326 (LV)	–	53%	45%	–	–	–	2%
Morning Consult	Aug 13–22, 2020	~764 (LV)	± (3%–4%)	51%	43%	–	–	–	–
Morning Consult	Aug 3–12, 2020	~764 (LV)	± (3%–4%)	50%	43%	–	–	–	–
Quinnipiac University	Jul 30 – Aug 3, 2020	914 (RV)	± 3.2%	47%	42%	–	–	4% (Note: "Someone else" and would not vote with 2%)	7%
Morning Consult	Jul 24 – Aug 2, 2020	741 (LV)	± 4.0%	49% (Note: Overlapping sample with the previous Morning Consult poll, but more information available regarding sample size and topline numbers)	44%	–	–	3% (Note: "Someone else" with 3%)	4%
Morning Consult	Jul 23 – Aug 1, 2020	~764 (LV)	± (3%–4%)	48%	45%	–	–	–	–
SurveyMonkey/Axios	Jul 1–31, 2020	1,700 (LV)	–	53%	44%	–	–	–	2%
Morning Consult	Jul 13–22, 2020	~764 (LV)	± (3%–4%)	50%	43%	–	–	–	–
ALG Research/Lindsey Must Go (Note: This poll's sponsor, Lindsey Must Go, is a PAC opposing Lindsey Graham)	Jul 15–20, 2020	591 (LV)	–	50%	45%	–	–	1%	4%
Gravis Marketing	Jul 17, 2020	604 (LV)	± 4.0%	50%	46%	–	–	–	–
brilliant corners Research & Strategies/Jaime Harrison (Note: This poll was sponsored by Harrison's campaign)	Jul 13–19, 2020	800 (LV)	± 3.5%	50%	43%	–	–	–	–
SurveyMonkey/Axios	Jun 8–30, 2020	863 (LV)	–	52%	47%	–	–	–	2%
Civiqs/Daily Kos	May 23–26, 2020	591 (RV)	± 4.5%	52%	42%	–	–	5% (Note: "Someone else" with 5%)	1%
AtlasIntel	Feb 25–28, 2020	1,100 (RV)	± 3.0%	48%	42%	–	–	11%	–
East Carolina University	Jan 31 – Feb 2, 2020	1,756 (RV)	± 2.7%	52%	40%	–	–	–	8%
Change Research	Jun 11–14, 2019	2,312 (RV)	± 2.0%	54%	38%	3% (Note: Generic)	1%	–	–
Emerson College	Feb 28 – Mar 2, 2019	755 (RV)	± 3.5%	52%	48%	–	–	–	–

Former candidates

Donald Trump vs. Bernie Sanders

Poll source	Date(s) administered	Sample size	Margin of error	Donald Trump (R)	Bernie Sanders (D)	Other	Undecided
AtlasIntel	Feb 25–28, 2020	1,100 (RV)	± 3.0%	48%	42%	9%	–
East Carolina University	Jan 31 – Feb 2, 2020	1,756 (RV)	± 2.7%	52%	40%	–	8%
Change Research	Jun 11–14, 2019	2,312 (RV)	± 2.0%	54%	34%	6% (Note: Generic Libertarian with 4%; generic Green with 2%)	–
Emerson College	Feb 28 – Mar 2, 2019	755 (RV)	± 3.5%	54%	46%	–	–

Donald Trump vs. Elizabeth Warren

Poll source	Date(s) administered	Sample size	Margin of error	Donald Trump (R)	Elizabeth Warren (D)	Undecided
AtlasIntel	Feb 25–28, 2020	1,100 (RV)	± 3.0%	49%	41%	10%
East Carolina University	Jan 31 – Feb 2, 2020	1,756 (RV)	± 2.7%	54%	36%	10%
Emerson College	Feb 28 – Mar 2, 2019	755 (RV)	± 3.5%	54%	46%	–

Donald Trump vs. Michael Bloomberg

Poll source	Date(s) administered	Sample size	Margin of error	Donald Trump (R)	Michael Bloomberg (D)	Undecided
East Carolina University	Jan 31 – Feb 2, 2020	1,756 (RV)	± 2.7%	53%	33%	13%

Donald Trump vs. Amy Klobuchar

Poll source	Date(s) administered	Sample size	Margin of error	Donald Trump (R)	Amy Klobuchar (D)	Undecided
East Carolina University	Jan 31 – Feb 2, 2020	1,756 (RV)	± 2.7%	52%	32%	15%
Emerson College	Feb 28 – Mar 2, 2019	755 (RV)	± 3.5%	56%	44%	–

Donald Trump vs. Pete Buttigieg

Poll source	Date(s) administered	Sample size	Margin of error	Donald Trump (R)	Pete Buttigieg (D)	Undecided
AtlasIntel	Feb 25–28, 2020	1,100 (RV)	± 3.0%	48%	37%	15%
East Carolina University	Jan 31 – Feb 2, 2020	1,756 (RV)	± 2.7%	52%	34%	13%

Donald Trump vs. Tom Steyer

Poll source	Date(s) administered	Sample size	Margin of error	Donald Trump (R)	Tom Steyer (D)	Undecided
East Carolina University	Jan 31 – Feb 2, 2020	1,756 (RV)	± 2.7%	52%	39%	9%

Donald Trump vs. Andrew Yang

Poll source	Date(s) administered	Sample size	Margin of error	Donald Trump (R)	Andrew Yang (D)	Undecided
East Carolina University	Jan 31 – Feb 2, 2020	1,756 (RV)	± 2.7%	52%	34%	14%

Donald Trump vs. Cory Booker

Poll source	Date(s) administered	Sample size	Margin of error	Donald Trump (R)	Cory Booker (D)	Other	Undecided
Change Research	Jun 11–14, 2019	2,312 (RV)	± 2.0%	54%	32%	6%	–
Emerson College	Feb 28 – Mar 2, 2019	755 (RV)	± 3.5%	54%	46%	–	–

Donald Trump vs Kamala Harris

Poll source	Date(s) administered	Sample size	Margin of error	Donald Trump (R)	Kamala Harris (D)	Other	Undecided
Change Research	Jun 11–14, 2019	2,312 (RV)	± 2.0%	54%	33%	6%	–
Emerson College	Feb 28 – Mar 2, 2019	755 (RV)	± 3.5%	56%	44%	–	–

Donald Trump vs. Beto O'Rourke

Poll source	Date(s) administered	Sample size	Margin of error	Donald Trump (R)	Beto O'Rourke (D)	Undecided
Emerson College	Feb 28 – Mar 2, 2019	755 (RV)	± 3.5%	56%	44%	–

Hypothetical polling

with Donald Trump, Bernie Sanders, and Howard Schultz

Poll source	Date(s) administered	Sample size	Margin of error	Donald Trump (R)	Bernie Sanders (D)	Howard Schultz (I)	Undecided
Emerson College	Feb 28 – Mar 2, 2019	755 (RV)	± 3.5%	51%	42%	7%	–

with Donald Trump, Elizabeth Warren, and Howard Schultz

Poll source	Date(s) administered	Sample size	Margin of error	Donald Trump (R)	Elizabeth Warren (D)	Howard Schultz (I)	Undecided
Emerson College	Feb 28 – Mar 2, 2019	755 (RV)	± 3.5%	53%	41%	7%	–

with Donald Trump, generic Democrat, and Howard Schultz

Poll source	Date(s) administered	Sample size	Margin of error	Donald Trump (R)	Generic Democrat	Howard Schultz (I)	Undecided
WPA Intelligence (R) (Note: Poll sponsored by Conservatives for Clean Energy)	Mar 11–13, 2019	500 (LV)	± 4.4%	46%	34%	3%	17%

=== Results ===
2020 United States presidential election in South Carolina
Party	Candidate	Votes	%	±%
Republican	Donald Trump (incumbent) Mike Pence (incumbent)	1,385,103	55.11%	+0.17%
Democratic	Joe Biden Kamala Harris	1,091,541	43.43%	+2.76%
Libertarian	Jo Jorgensen Spike Cohen	27,916	1.11%	−1.23%
Green	Howie Hawkins Angela Walker	6,907	0.27%	−0.35%
Alliance	Rocky De La Fuente Darcy Richardson	1,862	0.07%	N/A
Turnout		2,513,329	72.1%	4.24%
Total votes		2,513,329	100.00%	N/A

==== By county ====
County	Donald Trump Republican		Joe Biden Democratic		Various candidates Other parties		Margin		Total
County	#	%	#	%	#	%	#	%	Total
Abbeville	8,215	66.07%	4,101	32.98%	117	0.95%	4,114	33.09%	12,433
Aiken	51,589	60.56%	32,275	37.89%	1,321	1.55%	19,314	22.67%	85,185
Allendale	835	23.24%	2,718	75.65%	40	1.11%	-1,883	-52.41%	3,593
Anderson	67,565	70.31%	27,169	28.27%	1,359	1.42%	40,396	42.04%	96,093
Bamberg	2,417	37.29%	4,010	61.86%	55	0.85%	-1,593	-24.57%	6,482
Barnwell	5,492	53.21%	4,720	45.73%	109	1.06%	772	7.48%	10,321
Beaufort	53,194	54.37%	43,419	44.38%	1,222	1.25%	9,775	9.99%	97,835
Berkeley	57,397	54.95%	45,223	43.29%	1,838	1.76%	12,174	11.66%	104,458
Calhoun	4,305	51.92%	3,905	47.10%	81	0.98%	400	4.82%	8,291
Charleston	93,297	42.63%	121,485	55.51%	4,075	1.86%	-28,188	-12.88%	218,857
Cherokee	18,043	71.40%	6,983	27.63%	244	0.97%	11,060	43.77%	25,270
Chester	8,660	54.96%	6,941	44.05%	156	0.99%	1,719	10.91%	15,757
Chesterfield	11,297	59.85%	7,431	39.37%	148	0.78%	3,866	20.48%	18,876
Clarendon	8,361	49.97%	8,250	49.30%	112	0.73%	111	0.67%	16,733
Colleton	10,440	54.14%	8,602	44.61%	241	1.25%	1,838	9.53%	19,283
Darlington	16,832	51.92%	15,220	46.95%	365	1.13%	1,612	4.97%	32,417
Dillon	6,582	50.24%	6,436	49.13%	83	0.63%	146	1.11%	13,101
Dorchester	41,913	54.24%	33,824	43.77%	1,541	1.99%	8,089	10.47%	77,278
Edgefield	8,184	61.52%	4,953	37.23%	167	1.25%	3,231	24.29%	13,304
Fairfield	4,625	38.11%	7,382	60.83%	129	1.06%	-2,757	-22.72%	12,136
Florence	32,615	50.56%	31,153	48.29%	742	1.15%	1,462	2.27%	64,510
Georgetown	20,487	55.87%	15,822	43.15%	359	0.98%	4,665	12.72%	36,668
Greenville	150,021	58.11%	103,030	39.91%	5,104	1.98%	46,991	18.20%	258,155
Greenwood	19,431	60.71%	12,145	37.95%	430	1.34%	7,286	22.76%	32,006
Hampton	3,906	41.98%	5,323	57.21%	76	0.81%	-1,417	-15.23%	9,305
Horry	118,821	66.11%	59,180	32.92%	1,743	0.97%	59,641	33.19%	179,744
Jasper	7,078	49.17%	7,185	49.92%	131	0.91%	-107	-0.75%	14,394
Kershaw	20,471	60.87%	12,699	37.76%	459	1.37%	7,772	23.11%	33,629
Lancaster	30,312	60.78%	18,937	37.97%	619	1.25%	11,375	22.81%	49,868
Laurens	20,004	65.61%	10,159	33.32%	325	1.07%	9,845	32.29%	30,488
Lee	3,008	35.68%	5,329	63.21%	94	1.11%	-2,321	-27.53%	8,431
Lexington	92,817	64.20%	49,301	34.10%	2,450	1.70%	43,516	30.10%	144,568
Marion	5,711	38.84%	8,872	60.34%	121	0.82%	-3,161	-21.50%	14,704
Marlboro	5,044	44.07%	6,290	54.95%	112	0.98%	-1,246	-10.88%	11,446
McCormick	2,958	51.92%	2,687	47.17%	52	0.91%	271	4.75%	5,697
Newberry	11,443	61.42%	6,958	37.35%	230	1.23%	4,485	24.07%	18,631
Oconee	29,698	73.03%	10,414	25.61%	556	1.36%	19,284	47.42%	40,668
Orangeburg	13,603	33.01%	27,295	66.24%	307	0.75%	-13,692	-33.23%	41,205
Pickens	42,907	74.56%	13,645	23.71%	994	1.73%	29,262	50.85%	57,546
Richland	58,313	30.09%	132,570	68.40%	2,939	1.51%	-74,257	-38.31%	193,822
Saluda	6,210	66.96%	2,963	31.95%	101	1.09%	3,247	35.01%	9,274
Spartanburg	93,560	62.94%	52,926	35.60%	2,169	1.46%	40,634	27.34%	148,655
Sumter	21,000	42.93%	27,379	55.97%	541	1.10%	-6,379	-13.04%	48,920
Union	8,183	61.73%	4,935	37.23%	139	1.04%	3,248	24.50%	13,257
Williamsburg	5,532	34.61%	10,289	64.37%	164	1.02%	-4,757	-29.76%	15,985
York	82,727	57.43%	59,008	40.96%	2,315	1.61%	23,719	16.47%	144,050
Totals	1,385,103	55.11%	1,091,541	43.43%	36,685	1.46%	293,562	11.68%	2,513,329

Counties that flipped from Democratic to Republican

- Clarendon (largest city: Manning)
- Dillon (largest city: Dillon)

==== By congressional district ====
Trump won six of seven congressional districts.

District	Trump	Biden	Representative
1st	52%	46%	Joe Cunningham
1st	52%	46%	Nancy Mace
2nd	55%	44%	Joe Wilson
3rd	68%	31%	Jeff Duncan
4th	59%	39%	William Timmons
5th	58%	41%	Ralph Norman
6th	32%	67%	Jim Clyburn
7th	59%	40%	Tom Rice

== Analysis ==
South Carolina—a Deep Southern Bible Belt state that was once part of the Democratic Solid South—has had a Republican tendency since 1964. Since its narrow vote for Kennedy in 1960, it has voted Democratic only in 1976, for Jimmy Carter, the former governor of the neighboring state of Georgia. Accordingly, it has long been the most conservative state on the East Coast of the United States, although it has not been as conservative as its fellow Deep South states of Alabama, Mississippi, and Louisiana, largely due to populous and fast-growing Charleston and Richland Counties' trending more Democratic in the 21st century. As in the case of other Deep Southern states, South Carolina also has a large African-American population that helps keep the state somewhat more competitive than much of the Upper South. (The final state in the Deep South, Georgia, has become much more competitive than any of its fellow Deep South states in recent years due to the explosive growth of the Atlanta area.)

Trump performed somewhat better than polls anticipated, as aggregate polls averaged him only 7 points ahead of Biden. He flipped Clarendon County for the first time since 1972 and Dillon County for the first time since 1988. Biden became the first Democrat since Lyndon B. Johnson in 1964 to win the presidency without Clarendon, Calhoun, Colleton, and McCormick counties and the first Democrat since Harry S. Truman to win without Dillon and Chester counties.

Per exit polls by the Associated Press, Trump's strength in the Palmetto State came from White, born-again/Evangelical Christians, who supported Trump by 87%–9%. South Carolina is entirely in the Bible Belt. As is the case in many Southern states, there was a stark racial divide in voting for this election: White South Carolinians supported Trump by 69%–29%, while Black South Carolinians supported Biden by 92%–7%.

In other elections, longtime Republican U.S. Senator Lindsey Graham won another term in the United States Senate by 10.27 percentage points over Democrat Jaime Harrison. While Harrison lost by a double-digit margin, he still slightly outperformed Biden.

=== Edison exit polls ===
2020 presidential election in South Carolina by demographic subgroup (Edison exit polling)
Demographic subgroup	Biden	Trump	% of total vote
Total vote	43.43	55.11	100
Ideology
Liberals	92	7	15
Moderates	56	42	38
Conservatives	14	85	47
Party
Democrats	96	4	30
Republicans	4	95	41
Independents	46	50	29
Gender
Men	41	57	45
Women	45	53	55
Race/ethnicity
White	26	73	66
Black	90	7	26
Latino	–	–	5
Asian	–	–	0
Other	–	–	3
Age
18–24 years old	53	42	9
25–29 years old	30	68	6
30–39 years old	50	47	12
40–49 years old	53	46	18
50–64 years old	38	61	28
65 and older	40	60	27
Sexual orientation
LGBT	–	–	5
Not LGBT	40	59	95
Education
High school or less	46	53	22
Some college education	46	53	25
Associate degree	36	63	17
Bachelor's degree	43	55	23
Postgraduate degree	43	56	14
Income
Under $30,000	62	38	23
$30,000–49,999	42	56	18
$50,000–99,999	47	51	31
Over $100,000	34	64	30
Issue regarded as most important
Racial inequality	88	10	15
Coronavirus	89	10	16
Economy	11	87	36
Crime and safety	16	84	14
Health care	–	–	11
Region
Upcountry	32	66	25
Piedmont	41	57	14
Central	52	46	24
Pee Dee/Waccamaw	43	57	15
Low Country	49	50	21
Area type
Urban	55	43	14
Suburban	40	58	49
Rural	43	56	37
Family's financial situation today
Better than four years ago	15	84	49
Worse than four years ago	88	12	17
About the same	65	31	32

== See also ==
- United States presidential elections in South Carolina
- 2020 South Carolina elections
- 2020 United States presidential election
- 2020 Democratic Party presidential primaries
- 2020 Republican Party presidential primaries
- 2020 United States elections

== Notes ==
Partisan clients

Additional candidates
