= 1992 United States presidential election in South Carolina =

- November 3, 1992
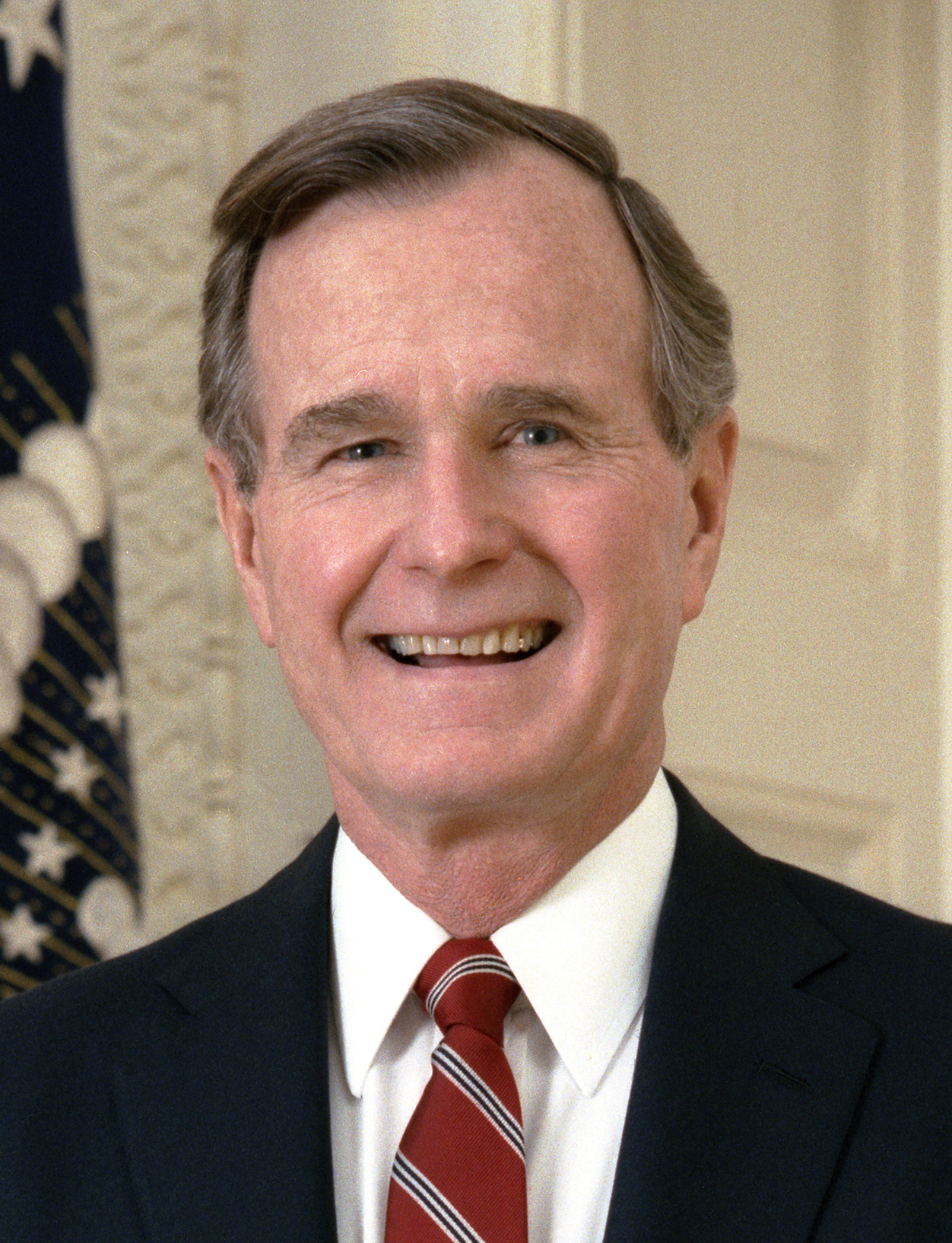

Nominee	George H. W. Bush	Bill Clinton	Ross Perot
Party	Republican	Democratic	Independent
Home state	Texas	Arkansas	Texas
Running mate	Dan Quayle	Al Gore	James Stockdale
Electoral vote	8	0	0
Popular vote	577,507	479,514	138,872
Percentage	48.02%	39.88%	11.55%

Bush
40–50%
50–60%
60–70%
Clinton
40–50%
50–60%
60–70%
President before election
George H. W. Bush
Republican
Elected President
Bill Clinton
Democratic

The 1992 United States presidential election in South Carolina took place on November 3, 1992, as part of the 1992 United States presidential election. Voters chose 8 representatives, or electors to the Electoral College, who voted for president and vice president.

South Carolina was won by incumbent President George H. W. Bush (R-Texas) with 48.02% of the popular vote over Governor Bill Clinton (D-Arkansas) with 39.88%. Businessman Ross Perot (I-Texas) finished in third, with 11.55% of the popular vote. Clinton ultimately won the national vote, defeating both incumbent President Bush and Perot.

This election was an example of South Carolina's transformation from one of the strongest Democratic states in the country to a reliably Republican one. South Carolina had voted for the Democratic nominee in every election from 1880 (the first election after Reconstruction) through 1944, always by wide margins and usually giving the Democrat over 90% of the vote. After it voted for Strom Thurmond in 1948, it returned to the Democratic fold to vote for Adlai Stevenson twice and for Kennedy in 1960, albeit narrowly.

== Background ==
With the exception of Jimmy Carter in the 1976 election South Carolina had not supported the Democratic presidential nominee since the 1960 presidential election. Republicans accounted for around 75% of registered voters in the 1980s. Republican Governor Carroll A. Campbell Jr. won reelection in the 1990 election.

== Primary ==
Tom Harkin withdrew after the South Carolina primary.

== General ==
At the time of the election, Clinton was only the fifth Democrat to win without carrying South Carolina, after Andrew Jackson, Martin van Buren, Harry S. Truman, and Lyndon B. Johnson. As of the 2020 presidential election, this is the last election in which Edgefield County voted for a Democratic presidential candidate. This is the first election in which any South Carolina county cast more than one hundred thousand votes, namely Greenville and Richland.

44.4% of the voting age population participated in the election, an increase from 38.9% in 1988, which was the second-lowest in the nation only ahead of Hawaii. With 48.02% of the popular vote, South Carolina would prove to be Bush's second strongest state in the 1992 election after Mississippi. South Carolina was the best state for Howard Phillips in terms of his percentage of the total vote.

60% of white voters supported Bush, 26% supported Clinton, and 14% supported Perot. 91% of black voters supported Clinton, 7% supported Bush, and 1% supported Perot. 44% of male voters supported Bush, 40% supported Clinton, and 16% supported Perot. Bush, contrary to national trends where Clinton did better among women, received the support of 52% of female voters while Clinton received 40% and Perot received 8%.

The Republicans gained six seats in the South Carolina House of Representatives and four seats in the South Carolina Senate. The Republicans gained one seat in the state's U.S. House delegation. Incumbent Democratic U.S. Senator Fritz Hollings won reelection in a concurrent election.

== Results ==
United States presidential election in South Carolina, 1992
Party	Candidate	Votes	Percentage	Electoral votes
Republican	George H. W. Bush (incumbent)	577,507	48.02%	8
Democratic	Bill Clinton	479,514	39.88%	0
Independent	Ross Perot	138,872	11.55%	0
Libertarian	Andre Marrou	2,719	0.23%	0
U.S. Taxpayers'	Howard Phillips	2,680	0.22%	0
New Alliance	Lenora Fulani	1,235	0.10%	0
Totals		1,202,527	100.00%	8

=== Results by county ===
County	George H.W. Bush Republican		Bill Clinton Democratic		Ross Perot Independent		Various candidates Other parties		Margin		Total votes cast
County	#	%	#	%	#	%	#	%	#	%	Total votes cast
Abbeville	3,317	39.76%	3,968	47.56%	1,036	12.42%	22	0.26%	-651	-7.80%	8,343
Aiken	25,731	55.01%	14,802	31.64%	6,056	12.95%	189	0.40%	10,929	23.37%	46,778
Allendale	1,049	30.36%	2,159	62.49%	212	6.14%	35	1.01%	-1,110	-32.13%	3,455
Anderson	24,793	51.68%	16,072	33.50%	6,966	14.52%	140	0.29%	8,721	18.18%	47,971
Bamberg	1,906	33.28%	3,426	59.82%	360	6.29%	35	0.61%	-1,520	-26.54%	5,727
Barnwell	4,026	49.24%	3,344	40.90%	752	9.20%	55	0.67%	682	8.34%	8,177
Beaufort	14,735	47.10%	11,466	36.65%	4,966	15.87%	120	0.38%	3,269	10.45%	31,287
Berkeley	18,048	50.87%	12,533	35.33%	4,632	13.06%	266	0.75%	5,515	15.54%	35,479
Calhoun	2,418	41.85%	2,770	47.94%	564	9.76%	26	0.45%	-352	-6.09%	5,778
Charleston	47,403	48.00%	40,095	40.60%	10,354	10.49%	897	0.91%	7,308	7.40%	98,749
Cherokee	6,887	47.31%	5,453	37.46%	2,186	15.02%	31	0.21%	1,434	9.85%	14,557
Chester	3,451	33.54%	5,458	53.05%	1,350	13.12%	29	0.28%	-2,007	-19.51%	10,288
Chesterfield	4,183	37.31%	5,691	50.76%	1,315	11.73%	23	0.21%	-1,508	-13.45%	11,212
Clarendon	4,147	37.89%	6,033	55.12%	744	6.80%	21	0.19%	-1,886	-17.23%	10,945
Colleton	4,545	40.17%	5,455	48.21%	1,245	11.00%	69	0.61%	-910	-8.04%	11,314
Darlington	8,912	44.00%	9,090	44.88%	1,863	9.20%	388	1.92%	-178	-0.88%	20,253
Dillon	3,575	38.07%	4,953	52.75%	831	8.85%	31	0.33%	-1,378	-14.68%	9,390
Dorchester	15,004	53.53%	9,160	32.68%	3,648	13.02%	217	0.77%	5,844	20.85%	28,029
Edgefield	3,339	45.15%	3,433	46.42%	596	8.06%	28	0.38%	-94	-1.27%	7,396
Fairfield	2,518	31.12%	4,867	60.15%	652	8.06%	54	0.67%	-2,349	-29.03%	8,091
Florence	19,802	50.77%	15,569	39.92%	3,499	8.97%	133	0.34%	4,233	10.85%	39,003
Georgetown	6,870	42.22%	7,494	46.05%	1,840	11.31%	68	0.42%	-624	-3.83%	16,272
Greenville	65,066	57.12%	34,651	30.42%	13,699	12.03%	491	0.43%	30,415	26.70%	113,907
Greenwood	9,079	47.98%	7,621	40.27%	2,101	11.10%	122	0.64%	1,458	7.71%	18,923
Hampton	2,402	32.63%	4,332	58.85%	564	7.66%	63	0.86%	-1,930	-26.22%	7,361
Horry	23,489	45.87%	18,896	36.90%	8,472	16.55%	347	0.68%	4,593	8.97%	51,204
Jasper	1,725	29.93%	3,453	59.92%	549	9.53%	36	0.62%	-1,728	-29.99%	5,763
Kershaw	8,499	49.12%	6,585	38.06%	2,150	12.43%	67	0.39%	1,914	11.06%	17,301
Lancaster	7,757	41.58%	8,307	44.53%	2,563	13.74%	28	0.15%	-550	-2.95%	18,655
Laurens	8,347	48.53%	6,638	38.59%	2,157	12.54%	58	0.34%	1,709	9.94%	17,200
Lee	2,730	34.90%	4,454	56.94%	611	7.81%	27	0.35%	-1,724	-22.04%	7,822
Lexington	41,759	60.50%	18,312	26.53%	8,652	12.54%	299	0.43%	23,447	33.97%	69,022
McCormick	899	29.46%	1,846	60.48%	295	9.67%	12	0.39%	-947	-31.02%	3,052
Marion	3,647	35.15%	5,843	56.31%	822	7.92%	64	0.62%	-2,196	-21.16%	10,376
Marlboro	2,526	29.47%	5,111	59.64%	895	10.44%	38	0.44%	-2,585	-30.17%	8,570
Newberry	5,980	48.50%	4,896	39.71%	1,393	11.30%	60	0.49%	1,084	8.79%	12,329
Oconee	10,379	50.68%	6,617	32.31%	3,405	16.63%	78	0.38%	3,762	18.37%	20,479
Orangeburg	11,328	35.14%	18,440	57.21%	2,383	7.39%	83	0.26%	-7,112	-22.07%	32,234
Pickens	17,008	57.67%	8,275	28.06%	4,128	14.00%	83	0.28%	8,733	29.61%	29,494
Richland	43,744	41.17%	53,648	50.49%	7,918	7.45%	940	0.88%	-9,904	-9.32%	106,250
Saluda	2,968	47.80%	2,393	38.54%	833	13.42%	15	0.24%	575	9.26%	6,209
Spartanburg	37,707	51.91%	25,488	35.09%	8,900	12.25%	540	0.74%	12,219	16.82%	72,635
Sumter	12,576	47.29%	11,852	44.56%	2,062	7.75%	106	0.40%	724	2.73%	26,596
Union	4,647	43.51%	4,644	43.48%	1,371	12.84%	18	0.17%	3	0.03%	10,680
Williamsburg	5,289	37.05%	8,077	56.57%	864	6.05%	47	0.33%	-2,788	-19.52%	14,277
York	21,297	48.74%	15,844	36.26%	6,418	14.69%	135	0.31%	5,453	12.48%	43,694
Totals	577,507	48.02%	479,514	39.88%	138,872	11.55%	6,634	0.55%	97,993	8.14%	1,202,527

==== Counties that flipped from Republican to Democratic ====
- Abbeville
- Calhoun
- Chester
- Chesterfield
- Colleton
- Darlington
- Dillon
- Edgefield
- Georgetown
- Lancaster
- Richland

=== Results by congressional district ===
Bush won 5 of South Carolina's 6 congressional districts, including two districts held by Democrats.

District	Bush	Clinton	Representative
1st	53%	33%	Arthur Ravenel, Jr.
2nd	52%	36%	Floyd Spence
3rd	51%	35%	Butler Derrick
4th	54%	33%	Bob Inglis
5th	45%	42%	John Spratt
6th	31%	62%	Jim Clyburn

== Works cited ==
- Moreland, Laurence; Steed, Robert; Baker, Tod, eds. (1991). The 1988 Presidential Election in the South: Continuity Amidst Change in Southern Party Politics. Praeger Publishers. ISBN 0275931455.
- Steed, Robert; Moreland, Laurence; Baker, Tod, eds. (1994). The 1992 Presidential Election in the South: Current Patterns of Southern Party and Electoral Politics. Praeger Publishers. ISBN 0275945340.
