= 1988 United States presidential election in South Carolina =

- November 8, 1988

Nominee	George H. W. Bush	Michael Dukakis
Party	Republican	Democratic
Home state	Texas	Massachusetts
Running mate	Dan Quayle	Lloyd Bentsen
Electoral vote	8	0
Popular vote	606,443	370,554
Percentage	61.50%	37.58%
County results
Bush
50–60%
60–70%
70–80%
Dukakis
50–60%
President before election
Ronald Reagan
Republican
Elected President
George H. W. Bush
Republican

The 1988 United States presidential election in South Carolina took place on November 8, 1988. All 50 states and the District of Columbia, were part of the 1988 United States presidential election. South Carolina voters chose eight electors to the Electoral College, which selected the president and vice president.

South Carolina was won by incumbent United States Vice President George H. W. Bush of Texas, who was running against Massachusetts Governor Michael Dukakis. Bush ran with Indiana Senator Dan Quayle as Vice President, and Dukakis ran with Texas Senator Lloyd Bentsen.

South Carolina weighed in for this election as 16% more Republican than the national average, and was the fourth most Republican state in the nation behind Utah, New Hampshire and Idaho. The presidential election of 1988 was a very partisan election for South Carolina, with more than 99 percent of the electorate voting for either the Democratic or Republican parties, and only four candidates appearing on the ballot.

As of the 2024 presidential election, this is the last election in which Richland County voted for a Republican Presidential candidate, while Dillon County would not vote Republican again until 2020. Bush won the election in South Carolina by a landslide 23.9% margin. Bush scored particularly strong wins in the population centers of Greenville and Lexington Counties, winning over 70% of the vote in both. He also powerfully won Spartanburg County, the largest county in the state that had remained a Democratic stronghold into the 1960s and 1970s, with over 60% of the vote.

== Background ==
With the exception of Jimmy Carter in the 1976 election South Carolina had not supported the Democratic presidential nominee since the 1960 presidential election. Democratic U.S. Senator Fritz Hollings won reelection in 1986, but Carroll A. Campbell Jr.'s victory in that year's gubernatorial election made him the second Republican governor in South Carolina in the 20th century.

== Campaign ==
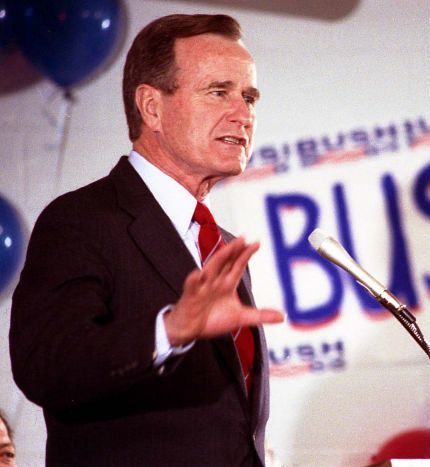
George H. W. Bush campaigning in North Augusta

South Carolina was the only southern state to not hold its primary on Super Tuesday.

George H. W. Bush won South Carolina in the Republican primary and placed first in all six congressional districts. Campbell was the chair of Bush's campaign in the southern region and Thomas F. Hartnett chaired the Bush campaign in South Carolina. Campbell proposed the selection of Jack Kemp or Bob Dole as Bush's vice-presidential running mate.

Dan Quayle was the only major party presidential or vice-presidential candidate to visit the state following the primaries with his tour of Darlington, on September 4.

While 72% of registered voters participated in the election, South Carolina had the second-lowest voter-age population turnout in the country at 38.9%, only ahead of Georgia's 38.8%. South Carolina gave Bush the highest-percentage amount of support in the South. Eleven of the twelve counties that Dukakis won had majority black populations while the remaining one, Marlboro County, had a black population of 40%. Among white voters, 79% supported Bush while 20% supported Dukakis.

The state's entire delegation to the U.S. House of Representatives, four Democratic and two Republican, was reelected and the Democrats retained control over the South Carolina General Assembly.

=== Polling ===
Poll source	Date(s) administered	Sample size	Margin of error	George Bush Republican	Michael Dukakis Democratic	Other / Undecided
The State	Late May 1988			53%	43%	4%
The State	Early September 1988			58.6%	35.8%	5.6%

== Results ==
1988 United States presidential election in South Carolina
Party	Candidate	Votes	Percentage	Electoral votes
Republican	George H. W. Bush	606,443	61.50%	8
Democratic	Michael Dukakis	370,554	37.58%	0
Libertarian	Ron Paul	4,935	0.50%	0
United Citizens Party	Lenora Fulani	4,077	0.41%	0
Totals		986,009	100.0%	8

=== Results by county ===
County	George H.W. Bush Republican		Michael Dukakis Democratic		Ron Paul Libertarian		Leonora Fulani United Citizens		Margin		Total votes cast
County	#	%	#	%	#	%	#	%	#	%	Total votes cast
Abbeville	3,738	50.51%	3,629	49.03%	19	0.26%	15	0.20%	109	1.48%	7,401
Aiken	27,665	71.84%	10,598	27.52%	142	0.37%	102	0.26%	17,067	44.32%	38,507
Allendale	1,295	41.59%	1,796	57.68%	9	0.29%	14	0.45%	-501	-16.09%	3,114
Anderson	25,939	67.58%	12,281	32.00%	88	0.23%	75	0.20%	13,658	35.58%	38,383
Bamberg	2,403	45.73%	2,830	53.85%	5	0.10%	17	0.32%	-427	-8.12%	5,255
Barnwell	4,467	63.14%	2,564	36.24%	16	0.23%	28	0.40%	1,903	26.90%	7,075
Beaufort	16,184	64.68%	8,691	34.73%	86	0.34%	60	0.24%	7,493	29.95%	25,021
Berkeley	16,779	63.81%	9,312	35.41%	66	0.25%	140	0.53%	7,467	28.40%	26,297
Calhoun	2,585	54.00%	2,175	45.44%	16	0.33%	11	0.23%	410	8.56%	4,787
Charleston	49,149	59.28%	32,977	39.77%	373	0.45%	417	0.50%	16,172	19.51%	82,916
Cherokee	7,763	63.89%	4,322	35.57%	34	0.28%	32	0.26%	3,441	28.32%	12,151
Chester	3,968	51.21%	3,737	48.23%	25	0.32%	18	0.23%	231	2.98%	7,748
Chesterfield	4,999	51.35%	4,699	48.27%	21	0.22%	16	0.16%	300	3.08%	9,735
Clarendon	4,337	46.15%	5,030	53.53%	12	0.13%	18	0.19%	-693	-7.38%	9,397
Colleton	4,962	51.97%	4,508	47.22%	26	0.27%	51	0.53%	454	4.75%	9,547
Darlington	9,854	55.23%	7,625	42.73%	202	1.13%	162	0.91%	2,229	12.50%	17,843
Dillon	3,793	53.66%	3,251	45.99%	11	0.16%	14	0.20%	542	7.67%	7,069
Dorchester	14,756	66.37%	7,371	33.15%	51	0.23%	54	0.24%	7,385	33.22%	22,232
Edgefield	3,814	55.57%	3,020	44.00%	14	0.20%	15	0.22%	794	11.57%	6,863
Fairfield	2,714	41.23%	3,827	58.13%	15	0.23%	27	0.41%	-1,113	-16.90%	6,583
Florence	19,490	60.50%	12,531	38.90%	106	0.33%	87	0.27%	6,959	21.60%	32,214
Georgetown	7,032	56.23%	5,402	43.20%	26	0.21%	46	0.37%	1,630	13.03%	12,506
Greenville	67,371	70.82%	27,188	28.58%	404	0.42%	163	0.17%	40,183	42.24%	95,126
Greenwood	9,096	57.92%	6,511	41.46%	44	0.28%	53	0.34%	2,585	16.46%	15,704
Hampton	2,826	44.81%	3,435	54.47%	14	0.22%	31	0.49%	-609	-9.66%	6,306
Horry	24,843	64.68%	13,316	34.67%	148	0.39%	102	0.27%	11,527	30.01%	38,409
Jasper	2,004	40.66%	2,894	58.71%	10	0.20%	21	0.43%	-890	-18.05%	4,929
Kershaw	8,877	65.89%	4,494	33.36%	61	0.45%	41	0.30%	4,383	32.53%	13,473
Lancaster	9,152	59.46%	6,181	40.15%	34	0.22%	26	0.17%	2,971	19.31%	15,393
Laurens	9,731	61.97%	5,930	37.77%	28	0.18%	13	0.08%	3,801	24.20%	15,702
Lee	2,936	46.17%	3,423	53.83%	0	0.00%	0	0.00%	-487	-7.66%	6,359
Lexington	41,467	77.89%	11,366	21.35%	286	0.54%	119	0.22%	30,101	56.54%	53,238
McCormick	1,172	40.22%	1,722	59.09%	16	0.17%	59	0.62%	-550	-18.87%	2,914
Marion	4,403	46.42%	5,008	52.79%	5	0.07%	7	0.10%	-605	-6.37%	9,486
Marlboro	2,921	42.52%	3,937	57.31%	3	0.10%	17	0.58%	-1,016	-14.79%	6,870
Newberry	6,427	62.37%	3,825	37.12%	23	0.22%	30	0.29%	2,602	25.25%	10,305
Oconee	10,184	69.83%	4,299	29.48%	75	0.51%	27	0.19%	5,885	40.35%	14,585
Orangeburg	13,281	47.35%	14,655	52.25%	64	0.23%	49	0.17%	-1,374	-4.90%	28,049
Pickens	17,448	73.63%	6,103	25.76%	110	0.46%	35	0.15%	11,345	47.87%	23,696
Richland	43,841	52.74%	36,420	43.81%	1,617	1.95%	1,245	1.50%	7,421	8.93%	83,123
Saluda	3,225	61.64%	1,984	37.92%	15	0.29%	8	0.15%	1,241	23.72%	5,232
Spartanburg	40,801	63.19%	22,964	35.57%	397	0.61%	406	0.63%	17,837	27.62%	64,568
Sumter	13,161	57.72%	9,502	41.67%	53	0.23%	85	0.37%	3,659	16.05%	22,801
Union	6,019	57.52%	4,420	42.24%	20	0.19%	6	0.06%	1,599	15.28%	10,465
Williamsburg	5,914	44.39%	7,343	55.11%	22	0.17%	45	0.34%	-1,429	-10.72%	13,324
York	21,657	65.02%	11,458	34.40%	123	0.37%	70	0.21%	10,199	30.62%	33,308
Totals	606,443	61.50%	370,554	37.58%	4,935	0.50%	4,077	0.41%	235,889	23.92%	986,009

==== Counties that flipped from Republican to Democratic ====
- Bamberg

==== Counties that flipped Democratic to Republican ====
- Edgefield

== Works cited ==
- Black, Earl; Black, Merle (1992). The Vital South: How Presidents Are Elected. Harvard University Press. ISBN 0674941306.
- Moreland, Laurence; Steed, Robert; Baker, Tod, eds. (1991). The 1988 Presidential Election in the South: Continuity Amidst Change in Southern Party Politics. Praeger Publishers. ISBN 0275931455.
- Steed, Robert; Moreland, Laurence; Baker, Tod, eds. (1994). The 1992 Presidential Election in the South: Current Patterns of Southern Party and Electoral Politics. Praeger Publishers. ISBN 0275945340.
