= Doar family =

Family name

Doar is the surname of an aristocratic family in the southern United States. Prior to the American Civil War, Doar family members were among the largest landowners in the South.

== History ==
The family's fortune in the U.S. originates mainly from plantations in Charleston, Georgetown, Berkeley, Orangeburg, Barnwell and Beaufort Counties, South Carolina.

Among the plantations that the Doar family owned were: Doar Plantation, Doar Point Plantation, Palo Alto (now part of the University of South Carolina's International Center for Public Health Research), Harrietta (on the National Register of Historic Places including the Doar Family Cemetery), Woodville, Walnut Grove, Montgomery, Oak Grove, Buck Hall, Egremont, Elmwood, Woodside, Hopsewee (National Register of Historic Places and birthplace of Thomas Lynch, Jr., who signed the Declaration of Independence), Wedge and Windsor.

The Doars were among the founding members of the Church of England in the south-eastern United States, and were part of efforts to open the first public schools in the south, mainly in Charleston County, South Carolina.

== Sources ==
- Doar, David. 1936. Rice and Rice Planting in the South Carolina Lowcountry
- University of South Carolina Institute for Southern Studies
