= 2012 United States presidential election in South Carolina =

- November 6, 2012

Nominee	Mitt Romney	Barack Obama
Party	Republican	Democratic
Home state	Massachusetts	Illinois
Running mate	Paul Ryan	Joe Biden
Electoral vote	9	0
Popular vote	1,071,645	865,941
Percentage	54.56%	44.09%

Romney
40–50%
50–60%
60–70%
70–80%
80–90%
90–100%
Obama
40–50%
50–60%
60–70%
70–80%
80–90%
90–100%
Tie/No Data
President before election
Barack Obama
Democratic
Elected President
Barack Obama
Democratic

The 2012 United States presidential election in South Carolina took place on November 6, 2012, as part of the 2012 United States presidential election in which all 50 states plus the District of Columbia participated. South Carolina voters chose 9 electors to represent them in the Electoral College via a popular vote pitting incumbent Democratic President Barack Obama and his running mate, Vice President Joe Biden, against Republican challenger and former Massachusetts Governor Mitt Romney and his running mate, Congressman Paul Ryan.

Also on the ballot were Libertarian nominee, former New Mexico Governor Gary Johnson and his running mate, jurist Jim Gray. The left-wing Green Party nominated activist and physician Jill Stein and her running mate, anti-poverty advocate Cheri Honkala. The conservative Constitution Party nominated former U.S. Representative from Virginia Virgil Goode for president, and former Chair of the Constitution Party Jim Clymer for vice president.

Romney defeated Obama in the state by 54.56% to 44.09%, a margin of 10.47%. While the state is generally considered safe for the Republican Party, it remains somewhat competitive due to a high African-American population, the sixth-highest in the country. The majority of the Democratic vote comes from the Black Belt, with areas such as Richland and Charleston counties, home to Columbia and Charleston respectively, providing high margins for the Democrats. However, this support is largely offset by suburban and rural white voters. The state hasn't voted for a Democrat since Jimmy Carter carried it in 1976. Romney also improved on John McCain's 8.97% margin in 2008.

As of the 2024 presidential election, this is the last time where the counties of Barnwell, Calhoun, Chester, Colleton, Darlington, and McCormick voted for the Democratic candidate.

== Primaries ==
=== Democratic primary ===
2012 South Carolina Democratic presidential primary
- January 28, 2012
Candidate	Barack Obama
Home state	Illinois
Percentage	99%

Incumbent President Barack Obama ran unopposed in the Democratic primary and easily won with more than 99% of the vote. The Democratic primary was held on January 28, 2012, one week after the Republican primary.

=== Republican primary ===
South Carolina Republican presidential primary, 2012
- January 21, 2012
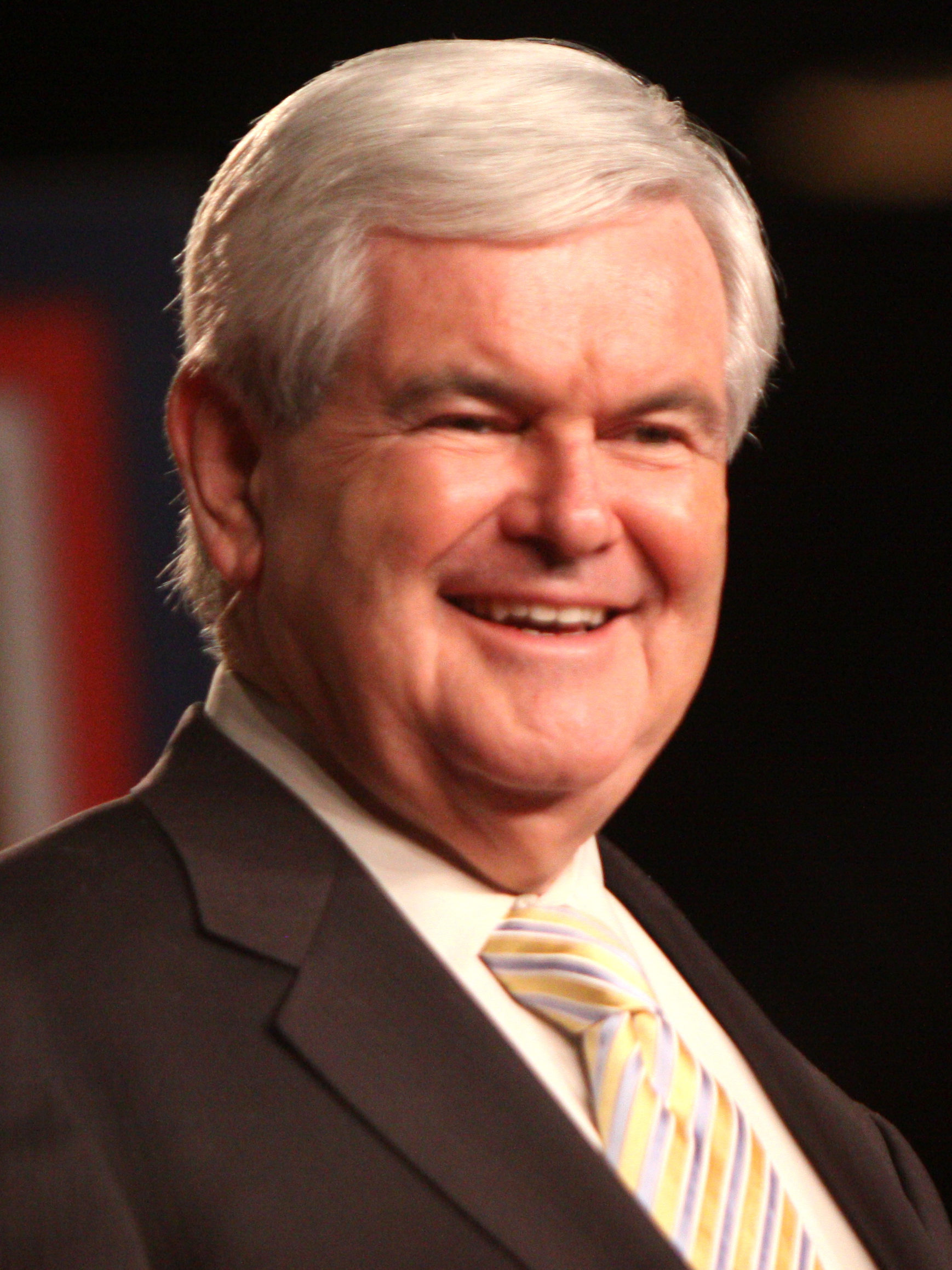

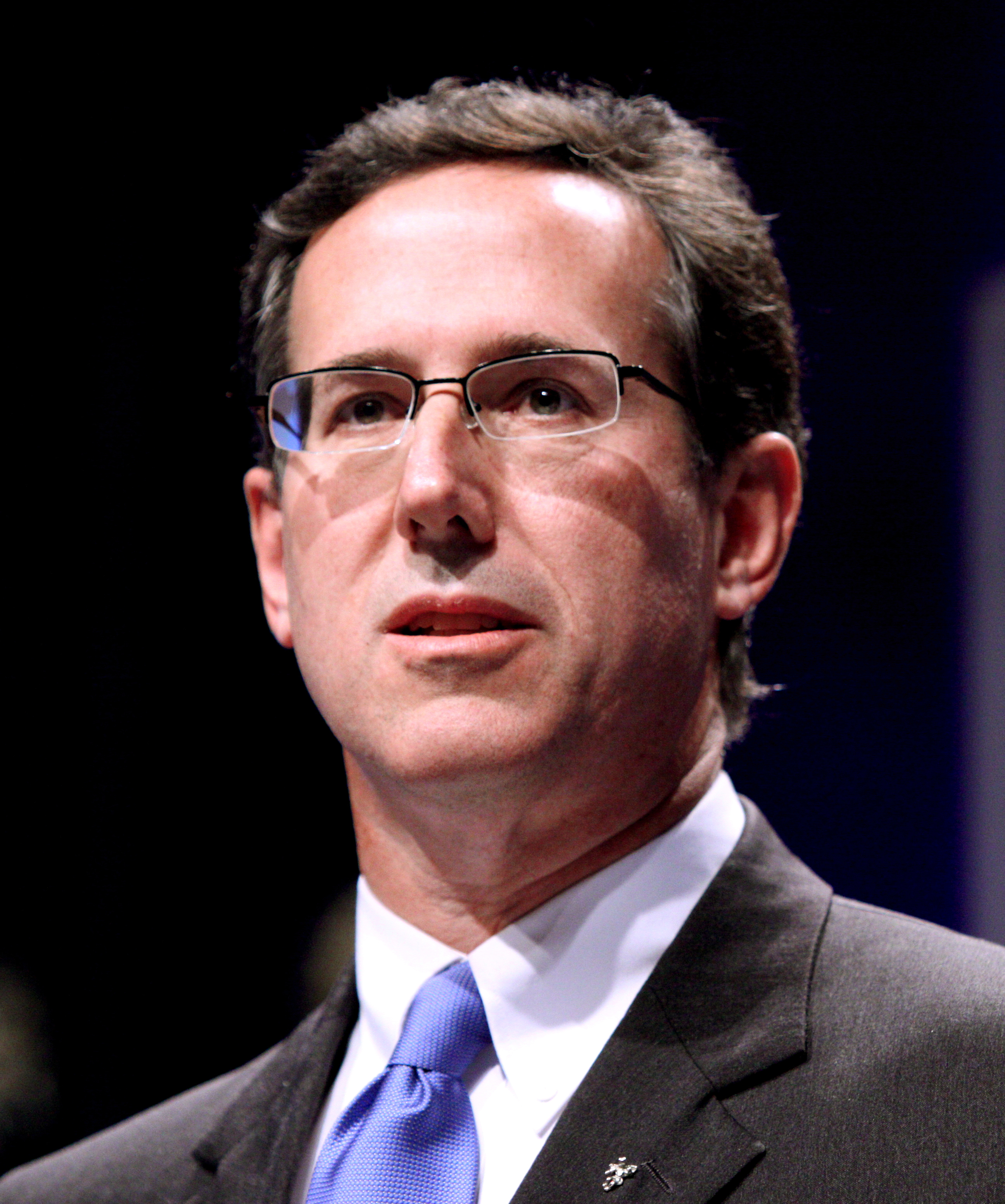

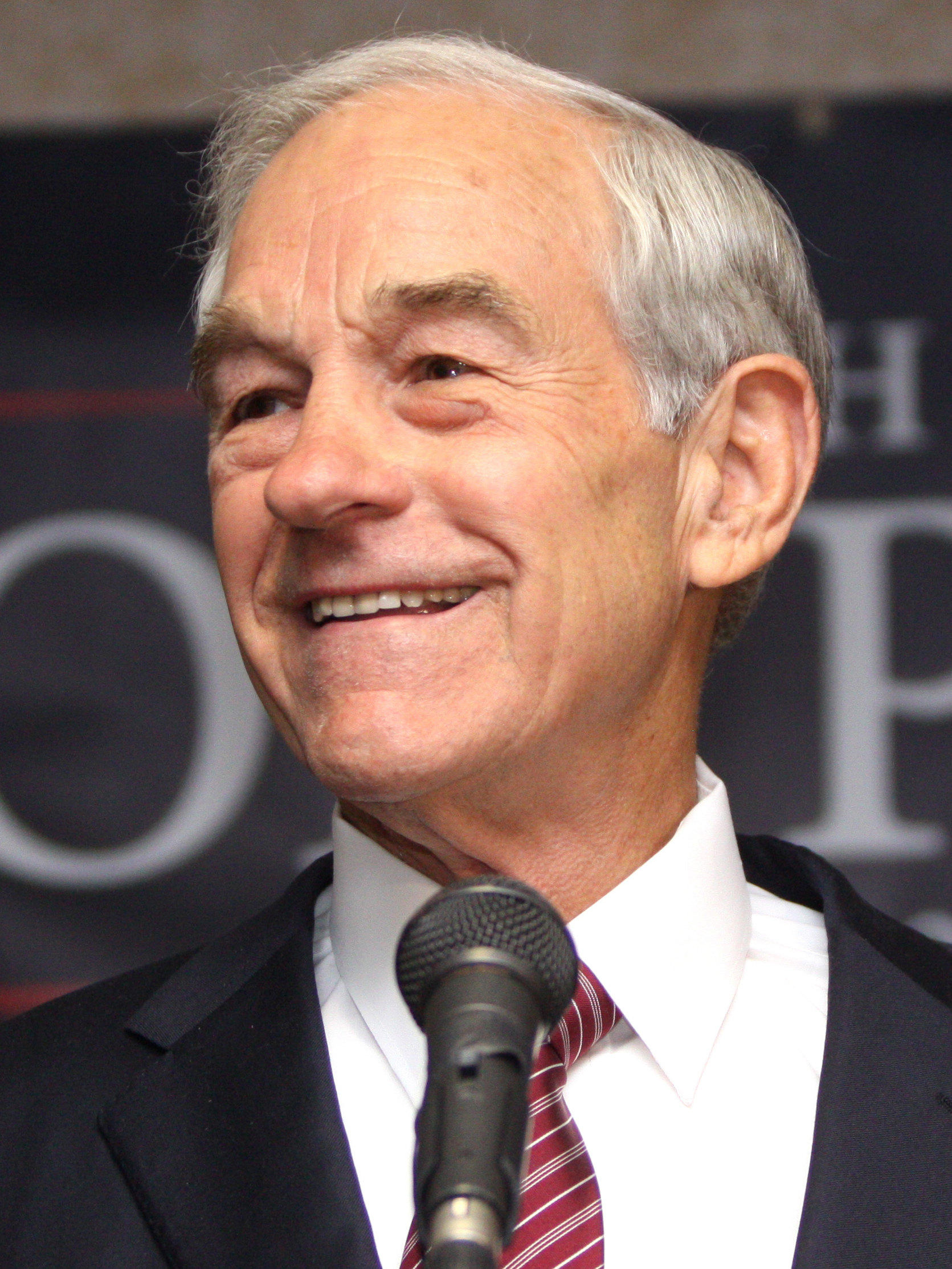
Candidate	Newt Gingrich	Mitt Romney
Home state	Georgia	Massachusetts
Delegate count	23	2
Popular vote	244,065	168,123
Percentage	40.42%	27.85%
Candidate	Rick Santorum	Ron Paul
Home state	Pennsylvania	Texas
Delegate count	0	0
Popular vote	102,475	78,360
Percentage	16.97%	12.98%
Gingrich
30–40%
40–50%
50–60%
60–70%
Romney
40–50%
50–60%

The Republican primary was held on January 21, 2012.

During the primary election campaign, the candidates ran on a platform of government reform in Washington. Domestic, foreign and economic policy emerged as the main themes in the election campaign following the onset of the 2008 economic crisis, as well as policies implemented by the Obama administration. This included the Patient Protection and Affordable Care Act, termed "Obamacare" by its opponents, as well as government spending as a whole.

The primary has become one of several key early state nominating contests in the process of choosing the nominee of the Republican Party for the election for President of the United States. It has historically been more important for the Republican Party than for the Democratic Party; from its inception in 1980, until the nomination of former Massachusetts Governor Mitt Romney in 2012, the winner of the Republican presidential primary had gone on to win the nomination. As of 2012, the primary has cemented its place as the "First in the South" primary for both parties. Former Speaker of the House Newt Gingrich was declared the winner of the race as soon as polls closed, however, Mitt Romney went on to win the nomination.

==== Date ====
The 2012 South Carolina Republican primary was tentatively scheduled to occur on February 28, 2012, much later than the date in 2008, which almost immediately followed the beginning of the year in January 2008. On September 29, 2011, the entire schedule of caucuses and primaries was disrupted, however, when it was announced that the Republican Party of Florida had decided to move up its primary to January 31, in an attempt to bring attention to its own primary contest, and attract the presidential candidates to visit the state. Because of the move, the Republican National Committee decided to strip Florida of half of its delegates. Also as a result, the South Carolina Republican Party, along with Iowa, New Hampshire and Nevada then sought to move their primaries and caucuses back into early January. All but Nevada, who agreed to follow Florida, confirmed their caucus and primary dates to take place throughout January, with South Carolina deciding to hold their contest on January 21, 2012. It is an open primary, meaning all registered voters can participate in the primary.

==== Ballot access ====
Nine candidates appeared on the presidential primary ballot. South Carolina had only 25 delegates up for grabs because it moved its primary to January 21. Eleven delegates were awarded for the statewide winner, Newt Gingrich, and two additional delegates were awarded to the winner of each of the seven congressional districts. Six districts were won by Gingrich, and one by Romney, giving Gingrich twelve additional delegates and Romney two delegates.

==== Results ====
There were 2,804,231 registered voters, for a turnout of 21.60%.

South Carolina Republican primary, 2012
Candidate	Votes	Percentage	Estimated national delegates
Newt Gingrich	244,065	40.42%	23
Mitt Romney	168,123	27.85%	2
Rick Santorum	102,475	16.97%	0
Ron Paul	78,360	12.98%	0
Herman Cain	6,338	1.05%	0
Rick Perry	2,534	0.42%	0
Jon Huntsman	1,173	0.19%	0
Michele Bachmann	491	0.08%	0
Gary Johnson	211	0.03%	0
Totals	603,770	100.00%	25

Key:	Withdrew prior to contest

== General election ==
=== Predictions ===
Source	Ranking	As of
Huffington Post	Safe R	November 6, 2012
CNN	Safe R	November 6, 2012
New York Times	Safe R	November 6, 2012
Washington Post	Safe R	November 6, 2012
RealClearPolitics	Solid R	November 6, 2012
Sabato's Crystal Ball	Solid R	November 5, 2012
FiveThirtyEight	Solid R	November 6, 2012

=== Results ===
United States presidential election in South Carolina, 2012
Party	Candidate	Running mate	Votes	Percentage	Electoral votes
Republican	Mitt Romney	Paul Ryan	1,071,645	54.56%	9
Democratic	Barack Obama (incumbent)	Joe Biden (incumbent)	865,941	44.09%	0
Libertarian	Gary Johnson	Jim Gray	16,321	0.83%	0
Green	Jill Stein	Cheri Honkala	5,446	0.28%	0
Constitution	Virgil Goode	Jim Clymer	4,765	0.22%	0
Totals			1,964,118	100.00%	9

==== By county ====
County	Mitt Romney Republican		Barack Obama Democratic		Various candidates Other parties		Margin		Total
County	#	%	#	%	#	%	#	%	Total
Abbeville	5,981	56.05%	4,543	42.57%	147	1.38%	1,438	13.48%	10,671
Aiken	44,042	62.59%	25,322	35.99%	999	1.42%	18,720	26.60%	70,363
Allendale	838	20.13%	3,297	79.20%	28	0.67%	-2,459	-59.07%	4,163
Anderson	48,709	67.45%	22,405	31.03%	1,098	1.52%	26,304	36.42%	72,212
Bamberg	2,194	31.88%	4,624	67.19%	64	0.93%	-2,430	-35.31%	6,882
Barnwell	4,659	46.95%	5,188	52.28%	76	0.77%	-529	-5.33%	9,923
Beaufort	42,687	58.24%	29,848	40.72%	762	1.04%	12,839	17.52%	73,297
Berkeley	38,475	56.42%	28,542	41.85%	1,178	1.73%	9,933	14.57%	68,195
Calhoun	3,707	47.32%	4,045	51.63%	82	1.05%	-338	-4.31%	7,834
Charleston	77,629	48.01%	81,487	50.39%	2,591	1.60%	-3,858	-2.38%	161,707
Cherokee	13,314	64.09%	7,231	34.81%	228	1.10%	6,083	29.28%	20,773
Chester	6,367	44.19%	7,891	54.77%	149	1.04%	-1,524	-10.58%	14,407
Chesterfield	8,490	51.16%	7,958	47.96%	146	0.88%	532	3.20%	16,594
Clarendon	7,071	43.40%	9,091	55.80%	130	0.80%	-2,020	-12.40%	16,292
Colleton	8,443	49.41%	8,475	49.60%	168	0.99%	-32	-0.19%	17,086
Darlington	14,434	47.87%	15,457	51.27%	259	0.86%	-1,023	-3.40%	30,150
Dillon	5,427	41.63%	7,523	57.71%	85	0.66%	-2,096	-16.08%	13,035
Dorchester	32,531	57.22%	23,445	41.24%	879	1.54%	9,086	15.98%	56,855
Edgefield	6,512	56.21%	4,967	42.87%	107	0.92%	1,545	13.34%	11,586
Fairfield	3,999	33.62%	7,777	65.38%	119	1.00%	-3,778	-31.76%	11,895
Florence	28,961	49.83%	28,614	49.23%	547	0.94%	347	0.60%	58,122
Georgetown	16,526	53.37%	14,163	45.74%	276	0.89%	2,363	7.63%	30,965
Greenville	121,685	62.99%	68,070	35.23%	3,434	1.78%	53,615	27.76%	193,189
Greenwood	16,348	57.02%	11,972	41.76%	352	1.22%	4,376	15.26%	28,672
Hampton	3,312	35.98%	5,834	63.37%	60	0.65%	-2,522	-27.39%	9,206
Horry	72,127	64.17%	38,885	34.60%	1,381	1.23%	33,242	29.57%	112,393
Jasper	4,169	41.60%	5,757	57.45%	95	0.95%	-1,588	-15.85%	10,021
Kershaw	16,324	58.41%	11,259	40.29%	363	1.30%	5,065	18.12%	27,946
Lancaster	19,333	58.33%	13,419	40.49%	392	1.18%	5,914	17.84%	33,144
Laurens	14,746	58.02%	10,318	40.60%	352	1.38%	4,428	17.42%	25,416
Lee	2,832	31.80%	5,977	67.10%	98	1.10%	-3,145	-35.30%	8,907
Lexington	76,662	68.07%	34,148	30.32%	1,813	1.61%	42,514	37.75%	112,623
Marion	5,164	34.46%	9,688	64.65%	134	0.89%	-4,524	-30.19%	14,986
Marlboro	3,676	37.31%	6,100	61.91%	77	0.78%	-2,424	-24.60%	9,853
McCormick	2,467	47.81%	2,653	51.41%	40	0.78%	-186	-3.60%	5,160
Newberry	9,260	56.63%	6,913	42.28%	178	1.09%	2,347	14.35%	16,351
Oconee	21,611	70.47%	8,550	27.88%	505	1.65%	13,061	42.59%	30,666
Orangeburg	12,022	27.93%	30,720	71.37%	299	0.70%	-18,698	-43.44%	43,041
Pickens	33,474	73.49%	11,156	24.49%	919	2.02%	22,138	49.00%	45,549
Richland	53,105	33.37%	103,989	65.34%	2,060	1.29%	-50,884	-31.97%	159,154
Saluda	5,135	59.96%	3,328	38.86%	101	1.18%	1,807	21.10%	8,564
Spartanburg	66,969	60.93%	41,461	37.72%	1,476	1.35%	25,508	23.21%	109,906
Sumter	19,274	40.74%	27,589	58.32%	446	0.94%	-8,315	-17.58%	47,309
Union	6,584	52.50%	5,796	46.22%	161	1.28%	788	6.28%	12,541
Williamsburg	4,824	29.59%	11,335	69.52%	145	0.89%	-6,511	-39.93%	16,304
York	59,546	59.42%	39,131	39.05%	1,533	1.53%	20,415	20.37%	100,210
Totals	1,071,645	54.56%	865,941	44.09%	26,532	1.35%	205,704	10.47%	1,964,118

Counties that flipped from Republican to Democratic

- Darlington (largest city: Hartsville)

==== By congressional district ====
Romney won six of seven congressional districts.

District	Romney	Obama	Representative
1st	58.25%	40.2%	Tim Scott
2nd	59.14%	39.43%	Joe Wilson
3rd	64.55%	33.95%	Jeff Duncan
4th	62.17%	36.2%	Trey Gowdy
5th	55.1%	43.62%	Mick Mulvaney
6th	28.1%	70.9%	Jim Clyburn
7th	54.55%	44.43%	Tom Rice

== See also ==
- South Carolina primary
- Republican Party presidential debates, 2012
- Republican Party presidential primaries, 2012
- Results of the 2012 Republican Party presidential primaries
- South Carolina Republican Party
