= 2024 United States presidential election in South Carolina =

- November 5, 2024
- Turnout: 76.76% (▲4.7 pp)

Nominee	Donald Trump	Kamala Harris
Party	Republican	Democratic
Home state	Florida	California
Running mate	JD Vance	Tim Walz
Electoral vote	9	0
Popular vote	1,483,747	1,028,452
Percentage	58.23%	40.36%

Trump
40–50%
50–60%
60–70%
70–80%
80–90%
90–100%
Harris
40–50%
50–60%
60–70%
70–80%
80–90%
90–100%
Tie/No data
President before election
Joe Biden
Democratic
Elected President
Donald Trump
Republican

The 2024 United States presidential election in South Carolina took place on Tuesday, November 5, 2024, as part of the 2024 United States presidential election in which all 50 states plus the District of Columbia participated. South Carolina voters choose electors to represent them in the Electoral College via a popular vote. The state of South Carolina has nine electoral votes in the Electoral College.

Prior to the election, almost all major news organizations considered South Carolina a safe red state; the state has voted Republican in every presidential election since 1980, including by double-digit margins since 2012.

South Carolina voted for Trump by a comfortable margin in the election, with him winning the state by 17.9%. Trump received more than 1.48 million votes, which was a record for votes cast for any candidate in the history of South Carolina. This was the largest Republican win in the state since 1988.

== Primary elections ==
=== Democratic primary ===
On February 4, 2023, the Democratic National Committee approved a new 2024 primary calendar, moving South Carolina to hold its race first on February 3, 2024. Due to protests of the change, the New Hampshire primary was scheduled for January 23, maintaining its traditional "first-in-the-nation" status. However, the primary was deemed non-binding, so the South Carolina primary was the first contest in which candidates could earn delegates. President Biden won the primary in a landslide, winning all 55 of the state's unbound delegates. The Democratic primary recorded low voter turnout among registered voters, with only 4% participating.

The South Carolina Democratic primary was held on February 3, 2024.

Popular vote share by county Biden: >90%

2024 South Carolina Democratic primary
Candidate	Votes	%	Delegates
Joe Biden (incumbent)	126,493	96.21	55
Marianne Williamson	2,732	2.08	0
Dean Phillips	2,247	1.71	0
Total	131,472	100%	55

=== Republican primary ===
The South Carolina Republican primary was held on February 24, 2024, the fifth contest in the nationwide Republican primaries. Nikki Haley, who served as the governor of South Carolina from 2011 to 2017, lost her home state to former president Donald Trump by 20 points. Trump won six congressional districts, earning a total of 47 delegates. Haley won the 1st district, earning three delegates. The Republican primary recorded a voter turnout of 23% among its registered voters, passing its 2016 turnout record.

Popular vote share by county Trump: 50–60%; 60–70%; 70–80%; 80–90%; Haley: 50–60%; 60–70%

South Carolina Republican primary, February 24, 2024
Candidate	Votes	Percentage	Actual delegate count		
Candidate	Votes	Percentage	Bound	Unbound	Total
Donald Trump	452,496	59.79%	47		47
Nikki Haley	299,084	39.52%	3		3
Ron DeSantis (withdrawn)	2,953	0.39%			
Vivek Ramaswamy (withdrawn)	726	0.10%			
Chris Christie (withdrawn)	658	0.09%			
Ryan Binkley	528	0.07%			
David Stuckenberg	361	0.05%			
Total:	756,806	100.00%	50	0	50

== General election ==
=== Predictions ===
Source	Ranking	As of
Cook Political Report	Solid R	December 19, 2023
Inside Elections	Solid R	April 26, 2023
Sabato's Crystal Ball	Safe R	June 29, 2023
Decision Desk HQ/The Hill	Safe R	December 14, 2023
CNalysis	Solid R	December 30, 2023
CNN	Solid R	January 14, 2024
The Economist	Safe R	October 16, 2024
538	Solid R	October 21, 2024
RCP	Likely R	June 26, 2024
NBC News	Safe R	October 6, 2024

=== Polling ===
Donald J. Trump vs. Kamala Harris

Poll source	Date(s) administered	Sample size (Note: Key: A – all adults RV – registered voters LV – likely voters V – unclear)	Margin of error	Donald Trump Republican	Kamala Harris Democratic	Other / Undecided
ActiVote	October 5–29, 2024	400 (LV)	± 4.9%	58.5%	41.5%	–
ActiVote	September 9 – October 17, 2024	400 (LV)	± 4.9%	58%	42%	–
Winthrop University	September 21–29, 2024	1,068 (LV)	± 3.0%	52%	42%	6% (Note: "Some other candidate" with 2%)

Donald J. Trump vs. Kamala Harris vs. Cornel West vs. Jill Stein vs. Chase Oliver

Poll source	Date(s) administered	Sample size	Margin of error	Donald J. Trump Republican	Kamala Harris Democratic	Cornel West Independent	Jill Stein Green	Chase Oliver Libertarian	Other / Undecided
The Citadel	October 17–25, 2024	1,241 (RV)	± 3.6%	53%	41%	0%	0%	0%	6%
The Citadel	October 17–25, 2024	1,136 (LV)	± 3.6%	54%	42%	0%	0%	0%	4%
East Carolina University	October 18–22, 2024	950 (LV)	± 3.0%	55%	42%	–	–	1%	2%

Hypothetical polling with Donald J. Trump and Joe Biden

Donald J. Trump vs. Joe Biden

Poll source	Date(s) administered	Sample size	Margin of error	Donald J. Trump Republican	Joe Biden Democratic	Other / Undecided
John Zogby Strategies (Note: Poll conducted for Kennedy's campaign)	April 13–21, 2024	501 (LV)	–	52%	40%	8%
Emerson College	February 14–16, 2024	1,197 (RV)	± 3.0%	51%	37%	12%
The Citadel	February 5–11, 2024	1,000 (RV)	± 4.1%	54%	35%	11%
Winthrop University	February 2–10, 2024	1,717 (RV)	± 2.4%	50%	35%	15%
Mainstreet Research/Florida Atlantic University	February 1–8, 2024	679 (RV)	± 3.8%	52%	34%	14%
Mainstreet Research/Florida Atlantic University	February 1–8, 2024	643 (LV)	± 3.8%	54%	36%	10%
Echelon Insights	August 31 – September 7, 2022	600 (LV)	± 5.1%	51%	39%	10%
Blueprint Polling (D)	August 24–25, 2022	721 (LV)	± 3.7%	46%	34%	20%

Donald J. Trump vs. Joe Biden vs. Robert F. Kennedy Jr. vs. Jill Stein vs. Joe Manchin

Poll source	Date(s) administered	Sample size	Margin of error	Donald J. Trump Republican	Joe Biden Democratic	Robert F. Kennedy Jr. Independent	Jill Stein Green	Joe Manchin Independent	Other / Undecided
The Citadel	February 5–11, 2024	1,000 (RV)	± 4.1%	49%	32%	9%	3%	4%	3%

Hypothetical polling with other candidates

Nikki Haley vs. Joe Biden

Poll source	Date(s) administered	Sample size	Margin of error	Nikki Haley Republican	Joe Biden Democratic	Other / Undecided
The Citadel	February 5–11, 2024	1,000 (RV)	± 4.1%	50%	28%	22%
Winthrop University	February 2–10, 2024	1,717 (RV)	± 2.4%	47%	29%	24%

Nikki Haley vs. Joe Biden vs. Robert F. Kennedy Jr. vs. Jill Stein vs. Joe Manchin

Poll source	Date(s) administered	Sample size	Margin of error	Nikki Haley Republican	Joe Biden Democratic	Robert F. Kennedy Jr. Independent	Jill Stein Green	Joe Manchin Independent	Other / Undecided
The Citadel	February 5–11, 2024	1,000 (RV)	± 4.1%	41%	25%	20%	3%	4%	7%

Donald J. Trump vs. Robert F. Kennedy Jr.

Poll source	Date(s) administered	Sample size	Margin of error	Donald J. Trump Republican	Robert F. Kennedy Jr. Independent	Other / Undecided
John Zogby Strategies	April 13–21, 2024	501 (LV)	–	47%	40%	13%

Robert F. Kennedy Jr. vs. Joe Biden

Poll source	Date(s) administered	Sample size	Margin of error	Robert F. Kennedy Jr. Independent	Joe Biden Democratic	Other / Undecided
John Zogby Strategies	April 13–21, 2024	501 (LV)	–	50%	35%	15%

Ron DeSantis vs. Joe Biden

Poll source	Date(s) administered	Sample size	Margin of error	Ron DeSantis Republican	Joe Biden Democratic	Other / Undecided
Echelon Insights	August 31 – September 7, 2022	600 (LV)	± 5.1%	42%	42%	16%

=== Ballot changes after the primaries ===
On July 21, 2024, Joe Biden announced his withdrawal from the presidential race and endorsed Kamala Harris. Harris and running mate Tim Walz replaced Biden on the South Carolina ballot.

On August 23, 2024, Robert F. Kennedy Jr., suspended his presidential campaign and endorsed Donald J. Trump. The Alliance Party of South Carolina removed Kennedy's name from the ballot, fielding no presidential candidate on their ticket for the year.

South Carolina political parties had until September 3 to make final changes and certify their presidential and vice presidential candidates for the state ballot.

=== Results ===
State House district results: Trump 40–50% 50–60% 60–70% 70–80% 80–90% / Harris 50–60% 60–70% 70–80%

2024 United States presidential election in South Carolina
Party	Candidate	Votes	%	±%
Republican	Donald Trump; JD Vance	1,483,747	58.23%	+3.12%
Democratic	Kamala Harris; Tim Walz	1,028,452	40.36%	−3.07%
Libertarian	Chase Oliver; Mike ter Maat	12,669	0.50%	−0.61%
Green	Jill Stein; Butch Ware	8,117	0.32%	+0.05%
United Citizens	Cornel West; Melina Abdullah	6,744	0.26%	N/A
Constitution	Randall Terry; Stephen Broden	5,352	0.21%	N/A
SCWP	Claudia De la Cruz; Karina Garcia	3,059	0.12%	N/A
Total votes		2,548,140	100.00%	N/A

==== By county ====
County	Donald Trump Republican		Kamala Harris Democratic		Various candidates Other parties		Margin		Total
County	#	%	#	%	#	%	#	%	Total
Abbeville	8,509	70.63%	3,399	28.21%	140	1.16%	5,110	42.41%	12,048
Aiken	53,592	62.25%	31,298	36.35%	1,201	1.40%	22,294	25.90%	86,091
Allendale	813	26.89%	2,165	71.62%	45	1.49%	-1,352	-44.72%	3,023
Anderson	71,828	73.07%	25,281	25.72%	1,187	1.21%	46,547	47.35%	98,296
Bamberg	2,376	41.73%	3,245	56.99%	73	1.28%	-869	-15.26%	5,694
Barnwell	5,605	57.18%	4,082	41.64%	116	1.18%	1,523	15.54%	9,803
Beaufort	59,123	56.63%	44,002	42.15%	1,278	1.22%	15,121	14.48%	104,403
Berkeley	64,777	57.41%	46,416	41.14%	1,641	1.45%	18,361	16.27%	112,834
Calhoun	4,474	56.53%	3,339	42.19%	101	1.28%	1,135	14.34%	7,914
Charleston	99,265	46.27%	111,427	51.94%	3,829	1.78%	-12,162	-5.67%	214,521
Cherokee	18,697	75.27%	5,939	23.91%	203	0.82%	12,758	51.36%	24,839
Chester	9,030	58.05%	6,353	40.84%	173	1.11%	2,677	17.21%	15,556
Chesterfield	11,682	63.52%	6,520	35.45%	189	1.03%	5,162	28.07%	18,391
Clarendon	9,065	55.55%	7,064	43.28%	191	1.17%	2,001	12.26%	16,320
Colleton	10,696	58.52%	7,376	40.36%	204	1.12%	3,320	18.17%	18,276
Darlington	17,017	56.10%	12,977	42.78%	337	1.11%	4,040	13.32%	30,331
Dillon	6,526	55.02%	5,241	44.19%	94	0.79%	1,285	10.83%	11,861
Dorchester	43,839	56.37%	32,489	41.78%	1,436	1.85%	11,350	14.60%	77,764
Edgefield	9,092	65.32%	4,659	33.47%	168	1.21%	4,433	31.85%	13,919
Fairfield	4,792	42.73%	6,277	55.97%	146	1.30%	-1,485	-13.24%	11,215
Florence	32,615	53.34%	27,706	45.32%	819	1.34%	4,909	8.03%	61,140
Georgetown	22,326	59.14%	14,965	39.64%	463	1.23%	7,361	19.50%	37,754
Greenville	158,541	60.21%	100,074	38.01%	4,701	1.79%	58,467	22.20%	263,316
Greenwood	19,715	63.83%	10,766	34.85%	407	1.32%	8,949	28.97%	30,888
Hampton	3,801	46.17%	4,328	52.57%	104	1.26%	-527	-6.40%	8,233
Horry	141,719	68.81%	62,325	30.26%	1,910	0.93%	79,394	38.55%	205,954
Jasper	9,900	54.32%	8,144	44.68%	183	1.00%	1,756	9.63%	18,227
Kershaw	21,289	63.49%	11,826	35.27%	418	1.25%	9,463	28.22%	33,533
Lancaster	33,623	61.78%	20,146	37.01%	658	1.21%	13,477	24.76%	54,427
Laurens	21,110	69.87%	8,769	29.02%	334	1.11%	12,341	40.85%	30,213
Lee	3,078	38.11%	4,505	55.78%	493	6.10%	-1,427	-17.67%	8,076
Lexington	96,965	66.01%	47,815	32.55%	2,123	1.45%	49,150	33.46%	146,903
Marion	5,906	44.11%	7,316	54.65%	166	1.24%	-1,410	-10.53%	13,388
Marlboro	4,896	48.23%	5,137	50.60%	119	1.17%	-241	-2.37%	10,152
McCormick	3,565	57.94%	2,513	40.84%	75	1.22%	1,052	17.10%	6,153
Newberry	12,067	66.56%	5,841	32.22%	221	1.22%	6,226	34.34%	18,129
Oconee	31,772	75.18%	9,987	23.63%	505	1.19%	21,785	51.55%	42,264
Orangeburg	13,750	37.19%	22,832	61.76%	388	1.05%	-9,082	-24.57%	36,970
Pickens	45,728	75.64%	13,891	22.98%	832	1.38%	31,837	52.67%	60,451
Richland	58,019	31.81%	121,110	66.39%	3,282	1.80%	-63,091	-34.59%	182,411
Saluda	6,452	71.58%	2,454	27.22%	108	1.20%	3,998	44.35%	9,014
Spartanburg	103,032	66.22%	50,710	32.59%	1,855	1.19%	52,322	33.63%	155,597
Sumter	21,215	46.97%	23,425	51.86%	530	1.17%	-2,210	-4.89%	45,170
Union	8,102	65.93%	4,084	33.23%	103	0.84%	4,018	32.70%	12,289
Williamsburg	5,524	38.55%	8,634	60.25%	172	1.20%	-3,110	-21.70%	14,330
York	88,239	58.80%	59,600	39.72%	2,220	1.48%	28,639	19.09%	150,059
Totals	1,483,747	58.23%	1,028,452	40.36%	35,941	1.41%	455,295	17.87%	2,548,140

County that flipped from Democratic to Republican

- Jasper (largest city: Hardeeville)

==== By congressional district ====
Trump won six of seven congressional districts.

District	Trump	Harris	Representative
1st	55.78%	42.70%	Nancy Mace
2nd	56.23%	42.28%	Joe Wilson
3rd	70.89%	27.89%	Sheri Biggs
4th	60.97%	37.41%	William Timmons
5th	60.71%	37.93%	Ralph Norman
6th	37.77%	60.63%	Jim Clyburn
7th	62.65%	36.30%	Russell Fry

== Analysis ==
South Carolina handed Republican Donald Trump a comfortable victory, doing so by a margin of 455,295 votes. Notably, Trump improved his margins in every county and gained significant support across all demographics, performing better in suburban, rural, and urban areas. He flipped Jasper County in the southwest of the state, becoming the first Republican to win it since Richard Nixon in 1972.

== See also ==
- United States presidential elections in South Carolina
- 2024 United States presidential election
- 2024 Democratic Party presidential primaries
- 2024 Republican Party presidential primaries
- 2024 South Carolina elections
- 2024 United States elections
