= Bamberg County, South Carolina =

County in South Carolina, United States

- County
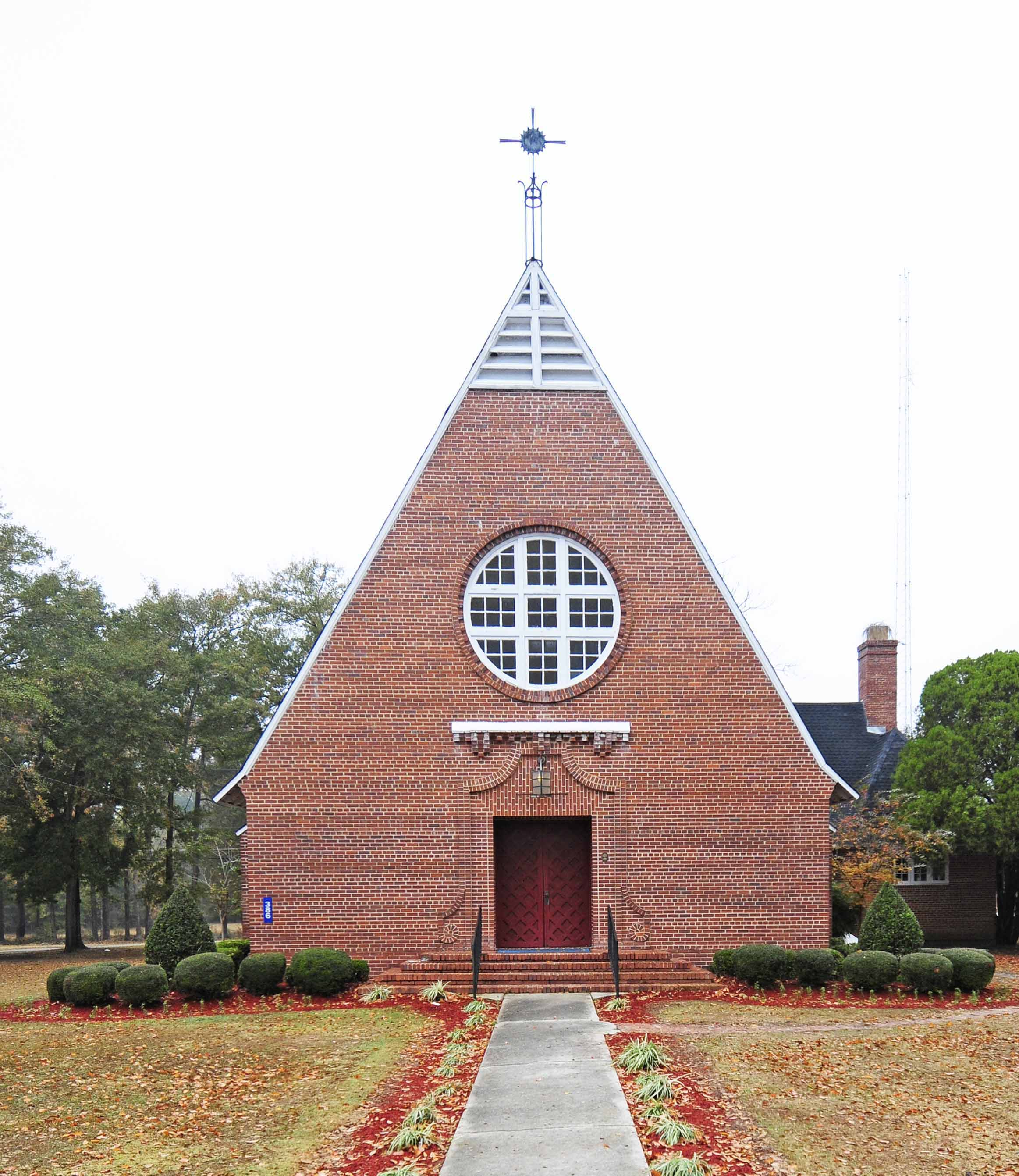
- St. Philip's Episcopal Church

- Seal Logo
- Motto: "Naturally"
- Location within the U.S. state of South Carolina
- Interactive map of Bamberg County, South Carolina
- Coordinates: 33.20°N 81.05°W
- Country: United States
- State: South Carolina
- Founded: 1897
- Named for: Francis Marion Bamberg
- Seat: Bamberg
- Largest community: Bamberg

Area
  - Total: 395.57 sq mi (1,024.5 km^{2})
  - Land: 393.37 sq mi (1,018.8 km^{2})
  - Water: 2.20 sq mi (5.7 km^{2}) 0.56%

Population (2020)
  - Total: 13,311
  - Estimate (2025): 12,796 ▼
  - Density: 33.838/sq mi (13.065/km^{2})
- Time zone: UTC−5 (Eastern)
  - Summer (DST): UTC−4 (EDT)
- Congressional district: 6th
- Website: www.bambergcountysc.gov

Bamberg County is a county located in the southwestern portion of U.S. state of South Carolina. As of the 2020 census, the population was 13,311, making the rural county the third-least populous of any in South Carolina. Its county seat is Bamberg. Voorhees University (formerly Voorhees College), a historically black university, was established here in the late nineteenth century. It is affiliated with the Episcopal Church.

== History ==
Part of an agricultural area since the antebellum years, this upland area was developed for the cultivation of short-staple cotton. As a result, African Americans have comprised a large portion of the workers and population for much of the county's history.

The rural county was created from the eastern portion of Barnwell County, under the new South Carolina Constitution adopted in 1895; it included an article prescribing the process to establish new counties. The referendum on creating Bamberg County was held on January 19, 1897. The name Bamberg was selected to honor General Francis Marion Bamberg. In 1919 and again in 1920, tiny portions of northwestern Colleton County were annexed to Bamberg County.

== Geography ==
According to the U.S. Census Bureau, the county has a total area of 395.57 square miles (1,024.5 km^{2}), of which 393.37 square miles (1,018.8 km^{2}) is land and 2.20 square miles (5.7 km^{2}) (0.56%) is water. It is the fourth-smallest county in South Carolina by land area and third-smallest by total area.

=== State and local protected areas ===
- Cathedral Bay Heritage Preserve
- Rivers Bridge State Park

=== Major water bodies ===
- Edisto River
- Lemon Creek
- Little Salkehatchie River
- Salkehatchie River

=== Adjacent counties ===
- Orangeburg County – north
- Dorchester County – east
- Colleton County – southeast
- Hampton County – south
- Allendale County – southwest
- Barnwell County – west

=== Major highways ===
- US 21
- US 78
- US 78 Conn.
- US 301
- US 321
- US 601
- SC 61
- SC 64
- SC 70
- SC 217
- SC 362

=== Major infrastructure ===
- Bamberg County Airport
- Denmark Station

== Demographics ==
Historical population
Census	Pop.	Note	%±
1900	17,296		—
1910	18,544		7.2%
1920	20,962		13.0%
1930	19,410		−7.4%
1940	18,643		−4.0%
1950	17,533		−6.0%
1960	16,274		−7.2%
1970	15,950		−2.0%
1980	18,118		13.6%
1990	16,902		−6.7%
2000	16,658		−1.4%
2010	15,987		−4.0%
2020	13,311		−16.7%
2025 (est.)	12,796	▼	−3.9%
U.S. Decennial Census; 1790–1960 1900–1990; 1990–2000 2010 2020

=== Racial and ethnic composition ===
Bamberg County, South Carolina – Racial and ethnic composition Note: the US Census treats Hispanic/Latino as an ethnic category. This table excludes Latinos from the racial categories and assigns them to a separate category. Hispanics/Latinos may be of any race.
Race / Ethnicity (NH = Non-Hispanic)	Pop 1980	Pop 1990	Pop 2000	Pop 2010	Pop 2020	% 1980	% 1990	% 2000	% 2010	% 2020
White alone (NH)	7,648	6,428	6,040	5,691	5,010	42.21%	38.03%	36.26%	35.60%	37.64%
Black or African American alone (NH)	10,234	10,356	10,352	9,786	7,749	56.49%	61.27%	62.14%	61.21%	58.22%
Native American or Alaska Native alone (NH)	6	22	27	38	25	0.03%	0.13%	0.16%	0.24%	0.19%
Asian alone (NH)	38	20	32	68	66	0.21%	0.12%	0.19%	0.43%	0.50%
Native Hawaiian or Pacific Islander alone (NH)	x	x	1	3	0	x	x	0.01%	0.02%	0.00%
Other race alone (NH)	3	1	4	6	36	0.02%	0.01%	0.02%	0.04%	0.27%
Mixed race or Multiracial (NH)	x	x	84	137	284	x	x	0.50%	0.86%	2.13%
Hispanic or Latino (any race)	189	75	118	258	141	1.04%	0.44%	0.71%	1.61%	1.06%
Total	18,118	16,902	16,658	15,987	13,311	100.00%	100.00%	100.00%	100.00%	100.00%

=== 2020 census ===
As of the 2020 census, the county had a population of 13,311, 5,394 households, and 3,355 families. The median age was 44.7 years, 19.7% of residents were under the age of 18, and 22.8% of residents were 65 years of age or older. For every 100 females there were 90.4 males, and for every 100 females age 18 and over there were 87.5 males age 18 and over.

The racial makeup of the county was 37.6% White, 58.2% Black or African American, 0.2% American Indian and Alaska Native, 0.5% Asian, 0.0% Native Hawaiian and Pacific Islander, 0.6% from some other race, and 2.4% from two or more races. Hispanic or Latino residents of any race comprised 1.1% of the population.

0.0% of residents lived in urban areas, while 100.0% lived in rural areas.

Of the 5,394 households, 27.6% had children under the age of 18 living with them and 39.0% had a female householder with no spouse or partner present. About 33.7% of all households were made up of individuals and 17.7% had someone living alone who was 65 years of age or older.

There were 6,558 housing units, of which 17.7% were vacant. Among occupied housing units, 68.5% were owner-occupied and 31.5% were renter-occupied. The homeowner vacancy rate was 2.0% and the rental vacancy rate was 5.8%.

=== 2010 census ===
At the 2010 census, there were 15,987 people, 6,048 households, and 3,920 families living in the county. The population density was 40.6 inhabitants per square mile (15.7/km^{2}). There were 7,716 housing units at an average density of 19.6 per square mile (7.6/km^{2}). The racial makeup of the county was 61.5% black or African American, 36.1% white, 0.4% Asian, 0.3% American Indian, 0.7% from other races, and 1.0% from two or more races. Those of Hispanic or Latino origin made up 1.6% of the population. In terms of ancestry, 5.1% were American, and 5.0% were German.

Of the 6,048 households, 31.4% had children under the age of 18 living with them, 38.3% were married couples living together, 21.6% had a female householder with no husband present, 35.2% were non-families, and 31.8% of all households were made up of individuals. The average household size was 2.44 and the average family size was 3.07. The median age was 39.3 years.

The median income for a household in the county was $32,538 and the median income for a family was $41,625. Males had a median income of $33,893 versus $27,324 for females. The per capita income for the county was $16,236. About 23.6% of families and 29.9% of the population were below the poverty line, including 40.7% of those under age 18 and 27.0% of those age 65 or over.

=== 2000 census ===
At the 2000 census, there were 16,658 people, 6,123 households, and 4,255 families living in the county. The population density was 42 people per square mile (16 people/km^{2}). There were 7,130 housing units at an average density of 18 per square mile (6.9/km^{2}). The racial makeup of the county was 62.50% Black or African American, 36.47% White, 0.16% Native American, 0.19% Asian, 0.01% Pacific Islander, 0.14% from other races, and 0.53% from two or more races. 0.71% of the population were Hispanic or Latino of any race.

There were 6,123 households, out of which 31.10% had children under the age of 18 living with them, 43.60% were married couples living together, 21.30% had a female householder with no husband present, and 30.50% were non-families. 27.80% of all households were made up of individuals, and 11.60% had someone living alone who was 65 years of age or older. The average household size was 2.55 and the average family size was 3.10.

In the county, the population was spread out, with 25.40% under the age of 18, 12.90% from 18 to 24, 24.60% from 25 to 44, 23.20% from 45 to 64, and 13.90% who were 65 years of age or older. The median age was 35 years. For every 100 females there were 88.70 males. For every 100 females age 18 and over, there were 84.00 males.

The median income for a household in the county was $24,007, and the median income for a family was $29,360. Males had a median income of $25,524 versus $3 for females. The per capita income for the county was $12,584. About 23.90% of families and 27.80% of the population were below the poverty line, including 87.00% of those under age 18 and 80% of those age 65 or over.

== Law and Government ==
The Bamberg county council is the governing body in the county. The council consists of seven members, elected from single-member districts:Sharon Hammond-District 2, Larry Haynes-District 3, Joe Guess, Jr- District 4, Isaiah Odom-District 5, Evert Comer, Jr- District 6, Clint Carter-District 7.

=== Politics ===
Prior to 1948, Bamberg County and South Carolina were Democratic Party strongholds similar to the rest of the Solid South, dominated by white Democrats. Most of the majority population of African Americans, who had supported the Republican Party during Reconstruction and the nineteenth century, had been disenfranchised by Democrats under the 1895 state constitution and related laws. These raised barriers to black voter registration and voting in South Carolina, as did similar laws across the South. After excluding blacks from the political system, the white-dominated legislature passed Jim Crow laws imposing legal segregation. Most blacks did not recover the ability to vote until years after passage of federal civil rights legislation in the mid-1960s.

As a result of the exclusion of black Republicans, white Democratic voters controlled elections in this state and others of the former Confederacy for decades, creating the Solid South. They elected Democratic presidential candidates by nearly unanimous margins of victory, while preserving all the power associated with apportionment based on total population.

The twenty years from 1948 to 1968 were transitional years for the politics of South Carolina and Bamberg County. President Harry Truman ordered integration of the military and took other initiatives on civil rights issues. Discontented with that direction, Southern Dixiecrat candidates twice carried the county, and Republican candidates carried the county three times in this timespan, twice before many African Americans began to vote.

Following Congressional passage of the Voting Rights Act of 1965, as a consequence of the civil rights movement, most African Americans in Bamberg County supported the Democratic Party, but they did not get to full voting strength in the county until after the 1972 presidential election, in which conservative whites carried the county for incumbent Republican President Richard Nixon. He had gained considerable support among whites in the South, a sign of what has become a nearly total shifting of their alliance to the Republican Party. In elections since 1972, the majority of county voters, with the enfranchisement of African Americans, have backed a Republican presidential candidate only once, voting for the popular incumbent Ronald Reagan by 16 votes.

United States presidential election results for Bamberg County, South Carolina
Year	Republican		Democratic		Third party(ies)	
Year	No.	%	No.	%	No.	%
1900	36	4.34%	793	95.66%	0	0.00%
1904	23	2.58%	868	97.42%	0	0.00%
1912	3	0.48%	616	99.35%	1	0.16%
1916	0	0.00%	820	99.88%	1	0.12%
1920	0	0.00%	688	100.00%	0	0.00%
1924	7	0.96%	708	97.12%	14	1.92%
1928	4	0.51%	779	99.49%	0	0.00%
1932	15	0.93%	1,598	99.07%	0	0.00%
1936	5	0.32%	1,542	99.68%	0	0.00%
1940	13	1.42%	904	98.58%	0	0.00%
1944	106	10.18%	737	70.80%	198	19.02%
1948	34	1.82%	124	6.62%	1,715	91.56%
1952	1,407	65.23%	750	34.77%	0	0.00%
1956	326	17.40%	430	22.95%	1,118	59.66%
1960	1,652	64.53%	908	35.47%	0	0.00%
1964	2,366	62.51%	1,419	37.49%	0	0.00%
1968	1,327	27.70%	1,845	38.52%	1,618	33.78%
1972	2,537	59.65%	1,680	39.50%	36	0.85%
1976	1,849	35.45%	3,330	63.84%	37	0.71%
1980	2,098	38.69%	3,294	60.75%	30	0.55%
1984	2,908	49.87%	2,892	49.60%	31	0.53%
1988	2,403	45.73%	2,830	53.85%	22	0.42%
1992	1,906	33.28%	3,426	59.82%	395	6.90%
1996	1,715	32.29%	3,380	63.63%	217	4.09%
2000	2,047	36.88%	3,451	62.17%	53	0.95%
2004	2,138	35.42%	3,841	63.63%	57	0.94%
2008	2,309	33.89%	4,426	64.95%	79	1.16%
2012	2,194	31.88%	4,624	67.19%	64	0.93%
2016	2,204	35.47%	3,898	62.73%	112	1.80%
2020	2,417	37.29%	4,010	61.86%	55	0.85%
2024	2,376	41.73%	3,245	56.99%	73	1.28%

== Economy ==
In 2022, the GDP of Bamberg County was $380.2 million (about $28,565 per capita). In chained 2017 dollars, the real GDP was $305.5 million (about $22,954 per capita). From 2022 through 2024, the unemployment rate has fluctuated between 4-7%.

As of April 2024, some of the largest employers in the county include Denmark Technical College and Voorhees University.

Employment and Wage Statistics by Industry in Bamberg County, South Carolina
Industry	Employment Counts	Employment Percentage (%)	Average Annual Wage ($)
Accommodation and Food Services	222	6.4	17,836
Agriculture, Forestry, Fishing and Hunting	172	4.9	38,584
Construction	54	1.5	33,696
Educational Services	683	19.6	44,356
Finance and Insurance	153	4.4	47,840
Health Care and Social Assistance	472	13.5	40,664
Information	11	0.3	137,540
Manufacturing	502	14.4	50,232
Other Services (except Public Administration)	52	1.5	23,400
Professional, Scientific, and Technical Services	114	3.3	59,852
Public Administration	271	7.8	42,328
Real Estate and Rental and Leasing	3	0.1	32,032
Retail Trade	432	12.4	26,676
Transportation and Warehousing	53	1.5	50,856
Utilities	125	3.6	84,968
Wholesale Trade	165	4.7	40,456
Total	3,484	100.0%	42,215

== Communities ==
=== Cities ===
- Bamberg (county seat and largest community)
- Denmark

=== Towns ===
- Ehrhardt
- Govan
- Olar

== Education ==
Institutions of tertiary education:

- Denmark Technical College
- Voorhees University

Since 2022 all of the county is a part of the Bamberg County School District. Prior to 2022, Bamberg School District One and Bamberg School District Two included sections of the county.

== Notable people ==
- Justin Bamberg, attorney
- Da’Quan Bowers, football player
- A. J. Cann, football player
- Andrew Faulker, baseball player
- Cally Gault, football coach
- Zack Godley, baseball player
- Nikki Haley, politician
- Julius Ness, judge
- Henry Odom, football player
- Cecil T. Sandifer, politician
- Ricky Sapp, football player
- Mark Smith, politician
- Wylly Folk St. John, writer
- Rodney Wallace, martial artist
- Baby Washington, singer
- Mookie Wilson, baseball player
- Preston Wilson, baseball player

== See also ==
- List of counties in South Carolina
- National Register of Historic Places listings in Bamberg County, South Carolina
- USS Bamberg County (LST-209)

== Other sources ==
- Lawrence, Margaret Spann (2003). Betty Jane Barker Miller (ed.). History of Bamberg County, South Carolina : commemorating one hundred years (1897–1997. Spartanburg, South Carolina: The Reprint Co. ISBN 0-87152-543-7. Archived from the original on February 1, 2009.
- Copeland, D. Graham (1940). Many Years After : a bit of history and some recollections of Bamberg, with appendix of data concerning a few Bamberg County families and their connections.
