= Barnwell State Park =

State park in South Carolina, US

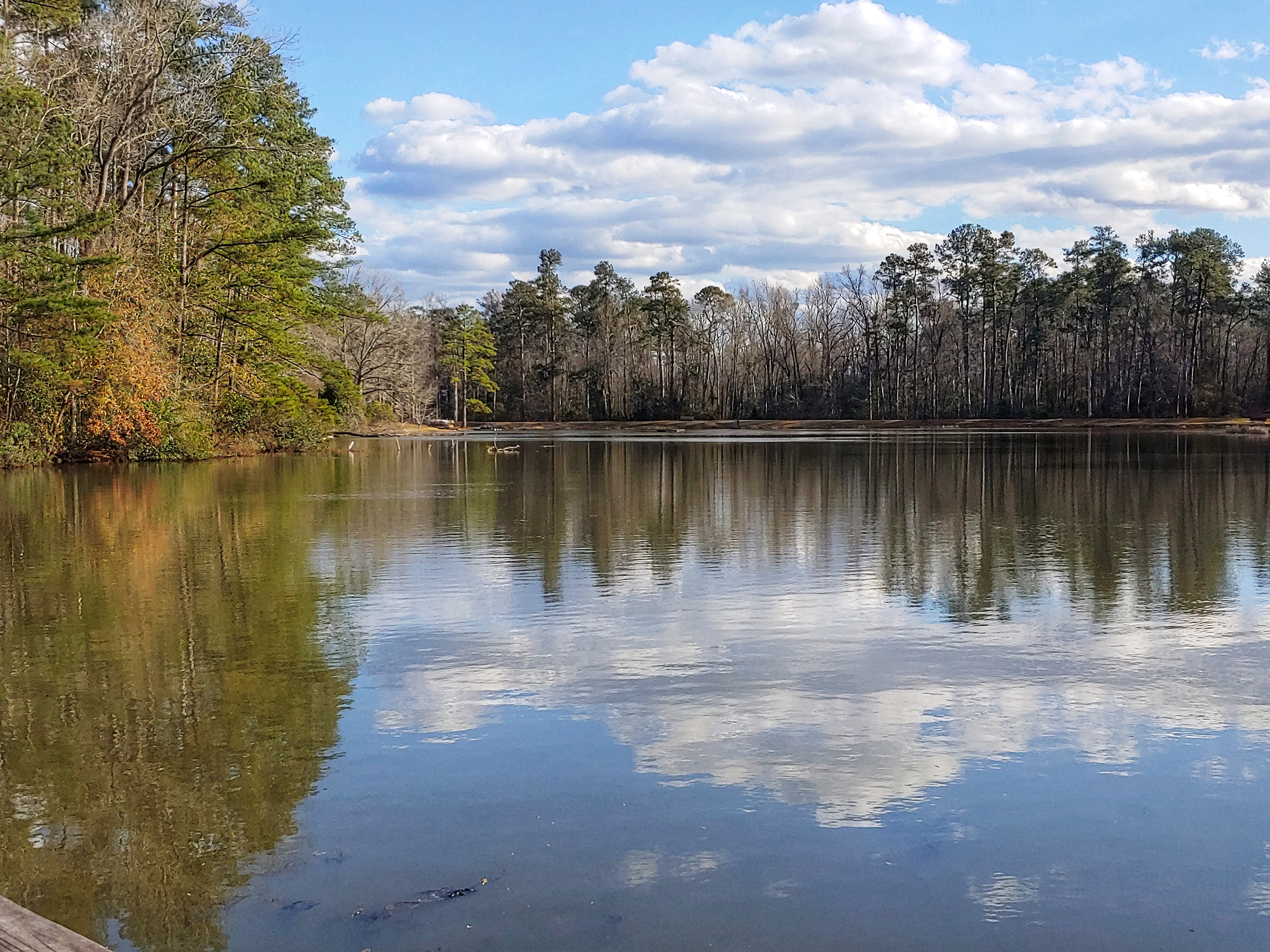
- Interactive map of Barnwell State Park
- Nearest city: Blackville, SC
- Coordinates: 33°19′44″N 81°18′03″W
- Area: 307 acres (1 km^{2})
- Created: 1937
- Camp sites: tent and RV sites, primitive group camping area
- Hiking trails: 1.5 mile long Dogwood Interpretive Trail

Barnwell State Park is a state park located near the town of Blackville in Barnwell County, South Carolina. The park was one of the 16 built by the Civilian Conservation Corps in South Carolina, sitting on land purchased from landowners in 1937. Many buildings constructed by the CCC are still in use.

Activities available at the park include picnicking, fishing, hiking and camping. Boats without engines are allowed in lakes located within the park. Amenities include a playground, picnic shelters, an area for volleyball, a fishing pier, a community building and a park store. Visitors can rent fishing rods and reels as well as non-motorized boats.
