= Barnwell County, South Carolina =

County in South Carolina, United States

- County
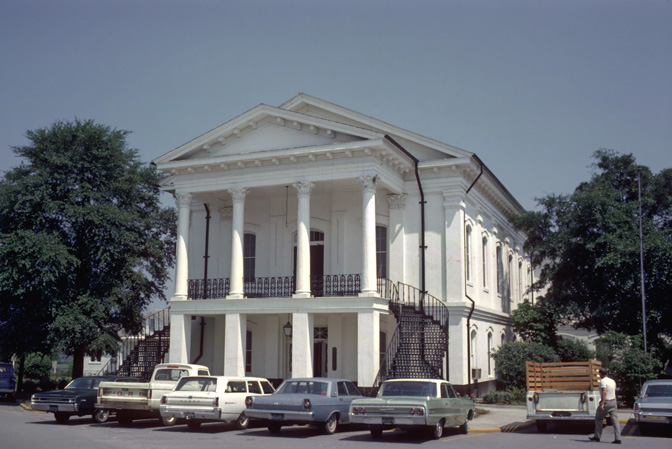
- Barnwell County Courthouse

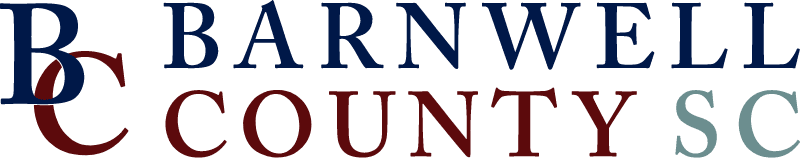
- Seal Logo

- Location within the U.S. state of South Carolina
- Interactive map of Barnwell County, South Carolina
- Coordinates: 33.26°N 81.43°W
- Country: United States
- State: South Carolina
- Founded: 1800
- Named for: John Barnwell
- Seat: Barnwell
- Largest community: Barnwell

Area
  - Total: 557.26 sq mi (1,443.3 km^{2})
  - Land: 548.38 sq mi (1,420.3 km^{2})
  - Water: 8.88 sq mi (23.0 km^{2}) 1.59%

Population (2020)
  - Total: 20,589
  - Estimate (2025): 20,653 ▲
  - Density: 37.545/sq mi (14.496/km^{2})
- Time zone: UTC−5 (Eastern)
  - Summer (DST): UTC−4 (EDT)
- Congressional district: 2nd
- Website: www.barnwellcountysc.us

Barnwell County is a county in the U.S. state of South Carolina. As of the 2020 census, its population was 20,589. It is located in the Central Savannah River Area. Its county seat is Barnwell.

== History ==
The Barnwell District was established in 1797 and became effective in 1800 from the southwestern portion of the Orangeburg District, along the Savannah River. It was named after John Barnwell, a local figure in the Revolutionary War.

In 1868, under the South Carolina Constitution revised during Reconstruction, South Carolina districts became counties. The government was made more democratic, with county officials to be elected by male citizens at least 21 years old, rather than by the state legislature as done previously.

In 1871, the legislature took the northwestern portion of the county to form part of the new Aiken County, the only county organized during the Reconstruction era. In 1874, the border with Aiken County was slightly adjusted. Aiken and Barnwell, with nearly equal, populations of Black and white people, had extensive violence in the months before the 1874 and 1876 elections, as groups of paramilitary Red Shirts rode to disrupt Black Republican meetings and intimidate voters to suppress Black voting. More than 100 Black men were killed in Aiken County during the violence, especially at Ellenton, South Carolina.

In 1895, white Democrats in the state legislature passed a new constitution, disfranchising most Blacks for more than 60 years by raising barriers to voter registration.

In 1897, the eastern third of the county was taken to form the new Bamberg County. In 1919, most of the southern half of the county was taken to form most of the new Allendale County, thus reducing Barnwell County to its present size.

== Geography ==
According to the U.S. Census Bureau, the county has a total area of 557.26 square miles (1,443.3 km^{2}), of which 548.38 square miles (1,420.3 km^{2}) is land and 8.88 square miles (23.0 km^{2}) (1.59%) is water.

=== State and local protected areas/sites ===
- Banksia Hall
- Barnwell State Park
- Long Branch Bay Heritage Preserve

=== Major water bodies ===
- Georges Creek
- Par Pond
- Salkehatchie River
- Savannah River
- South Fork Edisto River

=== Adjacent counties ===
- Aiken County – north
- Bamberg County – east
- Orangeburg County – east
- Allendale County – southeast
- Burke County, Georgia – southwest

=== Major highways ===
- US 78
- US 78 Bus.
- US 278
- SC 3
- SC 37
- SC 39
- SC 64
- SC 70
- SC 125
- SC 300
- SC 304

=== Major infrastructure ===
- Barnwell Regional Airport
- Savannah River Site (part)

== Demographics ==
Historical population
| Census | Pop. | Note | %± |
|---|---|---|---|
| 1800 | 7,376 | | — |
| 1810 | 12,280 | | 66.5% |
| 1820 | 14,750 | | 20.1% |
| 1830 | 19,236 | | 30.4% |
| 1840 | 21,471 | | 11.6% |
| 1850 | 26,608 | | 23.9% |
| 1860 | 30,743 | | 15.5% |
| 1870 | 35,724 | | 16.2% |
| 1880 | 39,857 | | 11.6% |
| 1890 | 44,613 | | 11.9% |
| 1900 | 35,504 | | −20.4% |
| 1910 | 34,209 | | −3.6% |
| 1920 | 23,081 | | −32.5% |
| 1930 | 21,221 | | −8.1% |
| 1940 | 20,138 | | −5.1% |
| 1950 | 17,266 | | −14.3% |
| 1960 | 17,659 | | 2.3% |
| 1970 | 17,176 | | −2.7% |
| 1980 | 19,868 | | 15.7% |
| 1990 | 20,293 | | 2.1% |
| 2000 | 23,478 | | 15.7% |
| 2010 | 22,621 | | −3.7% |
| 2020 | 20,589 | | −9.0% |
| 2025 (est.) | 20,653 | ▲ | 0.3% |
U.S. Decennial Census; 1790–1960 1900–1990; 1990–2000 2010 2020

=== Racial and ethnic composition ===
Barnwell County, South Carolina – Racial and ethnic composition Note: the US Census treats Hispanic/Latino as an ethnic category. This table excludes Latinos from the racial categories and assigns them to a separate category. Hispanics/Latinos may be of any race.
| Race / Ethnicity (NH = Non-Hispanic) | Pop 1980 | Pop 1990 | Pop 2000 | Pop 2010 | Pop 2020 | % 1980 | % 1990 | % 2000 | % 2010 | % 2020 |
|---|---|---|---|---|---|---|---|---|---|---|
| White alone (NH) | 11,438 | 11,421 | 12,857 | 11,715 | 10,352 | 57.57% | 56.28% | 54.76% | 51.79% | 50.28% |
| Black or African American alone (NH) | 8,104 | 8,677 | 9,957 | 9,964 | 8,785 | 40.79% | 42.76% | 42.41% | 44.05% | 42.67% |
| Native American or Alaska Native alone (NH) | 21 | 31 | 78 | 84 | 61 | 0.11% | 0.15% | 0.33% | 0.37% | 0.30% |
| Asian alone (NH) | 22 | 17 | 89 | 126 | 161 | 0.11% | 0.08% | 0.38% | 0.56% | 0.78% |
| Native Hawaiian or Pacific Islander alone (NH) | x | x | 6 | 2 | 14 | x | x | 0.03% | 0.01% | 0.07% |
| Other race alone (NH) | 12 | 1 | 14 | 19 | 58 | 0.06% | 0.00% | 0.06% | 0.08% | 0.28% |
| Mixed race or Multiracial (NH) | x | x | 150 | 300 | 638 | x | x | 0.64% | 1.33% | 3.10% |
| Hispanic or Latino (any race) | 271 | 146 | 327 | 411 | 520 | 1.36% | 0.72% | 1.39% | 1.82% | 2.53% |
| Total | 19,868 | 20,293 | 23,478 | 22,621 | 20,589 | 100.00% | 100.00% | 100.00% | 100.00% | 100.00% |

=== 2020 census ===
As of the 2020 census, there were 20,589 people, 8,460 households, and 5,260 families residing in the county. The median age was 42.5 years. 22.5% of residents were under the age of 18 and 19.2% of residents were 65 years of age or older. For every 100 females there were 92.2 males, and for every 100 females age 18 and over there were 89.6 males.

The racial makeup of the county was 51.0% White, 42.9% Black or African American, 0.4% American Indian and Alaska Native, 0.8% Asian, 0.1% Native Hawaiian and Pacific Islander, 1.3% from some other race, and 3.7% from two or more races. Hispanic or Latino residents of any race comprised 2.5% of the population.

0.0% of residents lived in urban areas, while 100.0% lived in rural areas.

There were 8,460 households in the county, of which 28.8% had children under the age of 18 living with them and 36.6% had a female householder with no spouse or partner present. About 31.7% of all households were made up of individuals and 14.2% had someone living alone who was 65 years of age or older.

There were 9,854 housing units, of which 14.1% were vacant. Among occupied housing units, 69.8% were owner-occupied and 30.2% were renter-occupied. The homeowner vacancy rate was 1.8% and the rental vacancy rate was 9.9%.

=== 2010 census ===
At the 2010 census, there were 22,621 people, 8,937 households, and 6,055 families living in the county. The population density was 41.2 inhabitants per square mile (15.9/km^{2}). There were 10,484 housing units at an average density of 19.1 units per square mile (7.4 units/km^{2}). The racial makeup of the county was 52.6% white, 44.3% Black or African American, 0.6% Asian, 0.4% American Indian, 0.7% from other races, and 1.5% from two or more races. Those of Hispanic or Latino origin made up 1.8% of the population. In terms of ancestry, 11.5% were American, 5.7% were German, and 5.4% were English.

Of the 8,937 households, 34.0% had children under the age of 18 living with them, 41.8% were married couples living together, 20.8% had a female householder with no husband present, 32.2% were non-families, and 28.4% of all households were made up of individuals. The average household size was 2.50 and the average family size was 3.05. The median age was 38.8 years.

The median income for a household in the county was $33,816 and the median income for a family was $41,764. Males had a median income of $35,957 versus $30,291 for females. The per capita income for the county was $17,592. About 20.8% of families and 25.4% of the population were below the poverty line, including 39.6% of those under age 18 and 11.5% of those age 65 or over.

=== 2000 census ===
At the 2000 census, there were 23,478 people, 9,021 households, and 6,431 families living in the county. The population density was 43 people per square mile (17 people/km^{2}). There were 10,191 housing units at an average density of 19 units per square mile (7.3 units/km^{2}). The racial makeup of the county was 55.18% White, 42.55% Black or African American, 0.35% Native American, 0.39% Asian, 0.03% Pacific Islander, 0.78% from other races, and 0.72% from two or more races. 1.39% of the population were Hispanic or Latino of any race.

There were 9,021 households, out of which 34.80% had children under the age of 18 living with them, 47.40% were married couples living together, 19.30% had a female householder with no husband present, and 28.70% were non-families. 25.60% of all households were made up of individuals, and 10.20% had someone living alone who was 65 years of age or older. The average household size was 2.57 and the average family size was 3.08.

In the county, the population was spread out, with 28.10% under the age of 18, 8.70% from 18 to 24, 27.90% from 25 to 44, 22.60% from 45 to 64, and 12.60% who were 65 years of age or older. The median age was 36 years. For every 100 females there were 92.70 males. For every 100 females age 18 and over, there were 86.50 males.

The median income for a household in the county was $28,591, and the median income for a family was $35,866. Males had a median income of $31,161 versus $21,904 for females. The per capita income for the county was $15,870. About 17.90% of families and 20.90% of the population were below the poverty line, including 27.30% of those under age 18 and 24.40% of those age 65 or over.

== Government and politics ==
Prior to 1948, Barnwell County was a Democratic Party stronghold similar to the rest of the Solid South, with Democratic presidential candidates receiving near-unanimous margins of victory in most years. The twenty years from 1948 to 1968 were a highly transitional time for the politics of South Carolina & Barnwell County, largely in part due to the Democratic Party's increasing support for African-American civil rights & enfranchisement. Segregationist candidates Strom Thurmond & George Wallace won the county in those aforementioned years, bookended by Democratic wins in 1952 & 1956 & Republican wins in 1960 & 1964. From 1972 on, the county has primarily Republican, but has become more of a swing county in recent years, backing the national winner in every presidential election from 2000 on except for 2020.

United States presidential election results for Barnwell County, South Carolina
| Year | Republican | | Democratic | | Third party(ies) | |
| Year | No. | % | No. | % | No. | % |
|---|---|---|---|---|---|---|
| 1900 | 57 | 4.03% | 1,356 | 95.97% | 0 | 0.00% |
| 1904 | 35 | 2.44% | 1,401 | 97.56% | 0 | 0.00% |
| 1912 | 15 | 1.29% | 1,139 | 98.27% | 5 | 0.43% |
| 1916 | 21 | 1.42% | 1,454 | 98.51% | 1 | 0.07% |
| 1920 | 25 | 3.35% | 721 | 96.65% | 0 | 0.00% |
| 1924 | 23 | 2.64% | 847 | 97.13% | 2 | 0.23% |
| 1928 | 34 | 3.20% | 1,028 | 96.80% | 0 | 0.00% |
| 1932 | 15 | 0.79% | 1,877 | 99.21% | 0 | 0.00% |
| 1936 | 2 | 0.09% | 2,157 | 99.91% | 0 | 0.00% |
| 1940 | 13 | 0.70% | 1,845 | 99.30% | 0 | 0.00% |
| 1944 | 8 | 0.53% | 1,482 | 98.41% | 16 | 1.06% |
| 1948 | 28 | 1.36% | 115 | 5.57% | 1,921 | 93.07% |
| 1952 | 657 | 29.14% | 1,598 | 70.86% | 0 | 0.00% |
| 1956 | 520 | 17.28% | 1,914 | 63.61% | 575 | 19.11% |
| 1960 | 1,842 | 58.05% | 1,331 | 41.95% | 0 | 0.00% |
| 1964 | 3,670 | 72.64% | 1,382 | 27.36% | 0 | 0.00% |
| 1968 | 1,849 | 31.25% | 1,716 | 29.01% | 2,351 | 39.74% |
| 1972 | 3,955 | 71.71% | 1,560 | 28.29% | 0 | 0.00% |
| 1976 | 2,569 | 38.62% | 4,083 | 61.38% | 0 | 0.00% |
| 1980 | 3,228 | 48.14% | 3,399 | 50.69% | 78 | 1.16% |
| 1984 | 4,346 | 60.45% | 2,811 | 39.10% | 32 | 0.45% |
| 1988 | 4,467 | 63.14% | 2,564 | 36.24% | 44 | 0.62% |
| 1992 | 4,026 | 49.24% | 3,344 | 40.90% | 807 | 9.87% |
| 1996 | 3,808 | 48.98% | 3,620 | 46.57% | 346 | 4.45% |
| 2000 | 4,521 | 54.63% | 3,661 | 44.24% | 94 | 1.14% |
| 2004 | 4,606 | 53.03% | 3,982 | 45.85% | 97 | 1.12% |
| 2008 | 4,769 | 48.67% | 4,931 | 50.33% | 98 | 1.00% |
| 2012 | 4,659 | 46.95% | 5,188 | 52.28% | 76 | 0.77% |
| 2016 | 4,889 | 51.54% | 4,400 | 46.39% | 196 | 2.07% |
| 2020 | 5,492 | 53.21% | 4,720 | 45.73% | 109 | 1.06% |
| 2024 | 5,605 | 57.18% | 4,082 | 41.64% | 116 | 1.18% |

== Economy ==
In 2022, Barnwell County's GDP was $556.3 million (approx. $27,018 per capita). In chained 2017 dollars, its real GDP was $448.3 million (approx. $21,774 per capita). From 2022 through 2024, the unemployment rate for the county has fluctuated from a high of 6.3% in January 2022 and a low of 3.2% in April 2023.

As of April 2024, Walmart is one of the largest employers in the county.

Employment and Wage Statistics by Industry in Barnwell County, South Carolina
| Industry | Employment Counts | Employment Percentage (%) | Average Annual Wage ($) |
|---|---|---|---|
| Accommodation and Food Services | 372 | 7.8 | 16,900 |
| Administrative and Support and Waste Management and Remediation Services | 83 | 1.7 | 54,080 |
| Agriculture, Forestry, Fishing and Hunting | 68 | 1.4 | 39,884 |
| Construction | 172 | 3.6 | 62,972 |
| Educational Services | 613 | 12.8 | 41,392 |
| Finance and Insurance | 64 | 1.3 | 40,716 |
| Health Care and Social Assistance | 715 | 14.9 | 36,296 |
| Information | 9 | 0.2 | 32,188 |
| Manufacturing | 1,039 | 21.7 | 59,956 |
| Other Services (except Public Administration) | 161 | 3.4 | 36,348 |
| Professional, Scientific, and Technical Services | 108 | 2.3 | 50,024 |
| Public Administration | 422 | 8.8 | 38,948 |
| Retail Trade | 797 | 16.6 | 26,624 |
| Transportation and Warehousing | 134 | 2.8 | 57,512 |
| Wholesale Trade | 33 | 0.7 | 47,164 |
| Total | 4,790 | 100.0% | 41,546 |

== Communities ==
=== City ===
- Barnwell (county seat and largest community)

=== Towns ===
- Blackville
- Elko
- Hilda
- Kline
- Snelling
- Williston

== Education ==
On July 1, 2024, the Barnwell County Consolidated School District and Barnwell School District 45 consolidated into one countywide school district, Barnwell County School District. A new Barnwell County High School is currently under construction and will house Career and Technical Education labs as well. The new high school is scheduled to open for the 2028-2029 academic year.

A portion is not in any school district, labeled by the 2010 U.S. census as "School District Not Defined". This corresponds with the Savannah River Site.

== Notable people ==
- James Brown (1933–2006), singer
- Rosa Louise Woodberry (1869–1932), journalist and school founder
- Sarah Lowe Twiggs (1839–1920), poet

== See also ==
- List of counties in South Carolina
- National Register of Historic Places listings in Barnwell County, South Carolina
