= 1960 United States presidential election in South Carolina =

- November 8, 1960

All 8 South Carolina votes to the Electoral College

Nominee	John F. Kennedy	Richard Nixon
Party	Democratic	Republican
Home state	Massachusetts	California
Running mate	Lyndon B. Johnson	Henry Cabot Lodge Jr.
Electoral vote	8	0
Popular vote	198,129	188,558
Percentage	51.24%	48.76%
County results
Kennedy
50–60%
60–70%
70–80%
Nixon
50–60%
60–70%
President before election
Dwight D. Eisenhower
Republican
Elected President
John F. Kennedy
Democratic

The 1960 United States presidential election in South Carolina took place on November 8, 1960, as part of the 1960 United States presidential election. South Carolina voters chose eight representatives, or electors, to the Electoral College, who voted for president and vice president.

For six decades up to 1950 South Carolina was a one-party state dominated by the Democratic Party. The Republican Party had been moribund due to the disfranchisement of blacks and the complete absence of other support bases as South Carolina completely lacked upland or German refugee whites opposed to secession. Between 1900 and 1948, no Republican presidential candidate ever obtained more than seven percent of the total presidential vote – a vote which in 1924 reached as low as 6.6 percent of the total voting-age population (or approximately 15 percent of the voting-age white population).

Following Harry S. Truman's To Secure These Rights in 1947, the following year South Carolina's small electorate overwhelmingly rejected him in favour of state Governor Strom Thurmond, who won 71 percent of the state's limited electorate and every county except poor white industrial Anderson and Spartanburg. During the 1950s, the state's wealthier and more urbanized whites became extremely disenchanted with the national Democratic Party and to a lesser extent with the federal administration of Republican Dwight D. Eisenhower. However, the state's abolition of its poll tax in 1950 allowed increasing white voter registration and the poor white upcountry provided enough support to national Democrat Adlai Stevenson II to keep the state Democratic in the 1952 and 1956 elections, aided by substantial majorities amongst the small but increasing number of blacks able to vote.

During the 1950s, wealthy textile mill owners in the upcountry developed a grassroots state Republican Party dedicated to the tenets of the John Birch Society. This group nominated the most conservative delegation at the party's 1960 convention. These wealthy businessmen would merge with hardline segregationists to draft Barry Goldwater for the Republican nomination in 1960, and at the same time, the "Independents" in the Lowcountry moved to support GOP nominees Richard Nixon and Henry Cabot Lodge Jr. as they had in 1952. At the same time, Protestant clergymen in the state were quite outspoken against the nomination of Catholic Massachusetts Senator John F. Kennedy by the Democratic Party.

Both candidates toured the state in October, when James F. Byrnes, former governor, criticized severely the Kennedy platform as economically unaffordable and injurious to the states' independence. In September and October polls, the state was considered likely to go for Nixon, and even on election night Nixon was leading until quite late when Kennedy overtook him. Kennedy ultimately won the state by 2.48 percentage points, being aided by an exceptional turnout for him amongst the state's seventy-five thousand or so black voters, and by the loyalty of the pro-Stevenson upcountry despite its distaste for his Catholicism. Nixon won a narrow majority of the state's white voters, and a strong majority amongst the wealthier whites of the growing Columbia and Charleston metropolitan areas. South Carolina was one of six states that swung toward Republicans compared to 1956, alongside Alabama, Georgia, Mississippi, Oklahoma, and Tennessee.

== Results ==
1960 United States presidential election in South Carolina
Party	Candidate	Votes	%
Democratic	John F. Kennedy	198,129	51.24%
Republican	Richard Nixon	188,558	48.76%
Write-in		1	0.00%
Total votes		386,688	100%

=== Results by county ===
County	John F. Kennedy Democratic		Richard Nixon Republican		Margin		Total votes cast
County	#	%	#	%	#	%	Total votes cast
Abbeville	3,064	78.38%	845	21.62%	2,219	56.76%	3,909
Aiken	6,674	38.38%	10,715	61.62%	-4,041	-23.24%	17,389
Allendale	583	39.63%	888	60.37%	-305	-20.74%	1,471
Anderson	13,901	78.33%	3,845	21.67%	10,056	56.66%	17,746
Bamberg	908	35.47%	1,652	64.53%	-744	-29.06%	2,560
Barnwell	1,331	41.95%	1,842	58.05%	-511	-16.10%	3,173
Beaufort	1,800	47.11%	2,021	52.89%	-221	-5.78%	3,821
Berkeley	2,542	51.21%	2,422	48.79%	120	2.42%	4,964
Calhoun	536	38.62%	852	61.38%	-316	-22.76%	1,388
Charleston	12,010	36.14%	21,223	63.86%	-9,213	-27.72%	33,233
Cherokee	5,391	77.50%	1,565	22.50%	3,826	55.00%	6,956
Chester	4,262	71.97%	1,660	28.03%	2,602	43.94%	5,922
Chesterfield	4,450	76.43%	1,372	23.57%	3,078	52.86%	5,822
Clarendon	1,134	43.97%	1,445	56.03%	-311	-12.06%	2,579
Colleton	1,962	43.77%	2,521	56.23%	-559	-12.46%	4,483
Darlington	4,668	57.19%	3,494	42.81%	1,174	14.38%	8,162
Dillon	2,652	64.83%	1,439	35.17%	1,213	29.66%	4,091
Dorchester	2,357	40.07%	3,525	59.93%	-1,168	-19.86%	5,882
Edgefield	846	36.88%	1,448	63.12%	-602	-26.24%	2,294
Fairfield	1,633	51.32%	1,549	48.68%	84	2.64%	3,182
Florence	6,090	51.15%	5,815	48.85%	275	2.30%	11,905 (Note: There was one write-in vote from Florence County)
Georgetown	2,811	51.88%	2,607	48.12%	204	3.76%	5,418
Greenville	13,976	38.15%	22,657	61.85%	-8,681	-23.70%	36,633
Greenwood	5,283	64.03%	2,968	35.97%	2,315	28.06%	8,251
Hampton	790	37.41%	1,322	62.59%	-532	-25.18%	2,112
Horry	6,006	61.45%	3,768	38.55%	2,238	22.90%	9,774
Jasper	721	48.07%	779	51.93%	-58	-3.86%	1,500
Kershaw	3,178	47.84%	3,465	52.16%	-287	-4.32%	6,643
Lancaster	5,561	65.66%	2,909	34.34%	2,652	31.32%	8,470
Laurens	4,547	57.95%	3,299	42.05%	1,248	15.90%	7,846
Lee	1,487	53.41%	1,297	46.59%	190	6.82%	2,784
Lexington	4,159	38.98%	6,511	61.02%	-2,352	-22.04%	10,670
McCormick	680	66.21%	347	33.79%	333	32.42%	1,027
Marion	2,397	59.29%	1,646	40.71%	751	18.58%	4,043
Marlboro	2,586	66.70%	1,291	33.30%	1,295	33.40%	3,877
Newberry	3,143	52.52%	2,841	47.48%	302	5.04%	5,984
Oconee	4,328	69.65%	1,886	30.35%	2,442	39.30%	6,214
Orangeburg	3,890	42.64%	5,233	57.36%	-1,343	-14.72%	9,123
Pickens	2,546	37.74%	4,201	62.26%	-1,655	-24.52%	6,747
Richland	11,694	36.06%	20,736	63.94%	-9,042	-27.88%	32,430
Saluda	1,353	51.62%	1,268	48.38%	85	3.24%	2,621
Spartanburg	20,134	64.79%	10,940	35.21%	9,194	29.58%	31,074
Sumter	2,616	36.09%	4,633	63.91%	-2,017	-27.82%	7,249
Union	5,229	72.53%	1,980	27.47%	3,249	45.06%	7,209
Williamsburg	1,513	39.43%	2,324	60.57%	-811	-21.14%	3,837
York	8,707	61.23%	5,512	38.77%	3,195	22.46%	14,219
Totals	198,129	51.24%	188,558	48.76%	9,571	2.48%	386,688

==== Counties that flipped from Unpledged to Democratic ====
- Berkeley
- Clarendon
- Colleton
- Dorchester
- Edgefield
- Fairfield
- Florence
- Georgetown
- Lee

==== Counties that flipped from Democratic to Republican ====
- Barnwell
- Greenville
- Pickens

==== Counties that flipped from Unpledged to Republican ====
- Allendale
- Bamberg
- Calhoun
- Charleston
- Hampton
- Jasper
- Kershaw
- Lexington
- Orangeburg
- Richland
- Sumter
- Williasburg
