= 1976 United States presidential election in South Carolina =

- November 2, 1976

Nominee	Jimmy Carter	Gerald Ford
Party	Democratic	Republican
Home state	Georgia	Michigan
Running mate	Walter Mondale	Bob Dole
Electoral vote	8	0
Popular vote	450,825	346,140
Percentage	56.17%	43.13%
County results
Carter
40–50%
50–60%
60–70%
70–80%
Ford
50–60%
President before election
Gerald Ford
Republican
Elected President
Jimmy Carter
Democratic

The 1976 United States presidential election in South Carolina took place on November 2, 1976. All 50 states and the District of Columbia were part of the 1976 United States presidential election. South Carolina voters chose eight electors to the Electoral College, who voted for president and vice president. Despite fluctuating polls, Carter would carry South Carolina by a margin of 13.04 points over Ford.

Ford managed to carry just three of South Carolina's counties, whereas Richard Nixon had carried all 46 counties four years earlier. As of the 2024 presidential election, this is the last time that the Democratic nominee carried South Carolina, the last time a Democrat won Horry, Spartanburg, Berkeley, Beaufort, Dorchester, Florence, Pickens, Kershaw, and Newberry counties, and the last time a Democrat swept every congressional district in the state.

== Campaign ==
Both major party nominees, Democrat former Georgia Governor Jimmy Carter, with running mate Walter Mondale, and Republican President Gerald Ford with running mate Senator Bob Dole, campaigned in the state during the fall campaign. Ford did not target the state in late September at the beginning of his re-election campaign, but did visit Columbia in late October as polling day approached, when he was joined by Carter two days subsequently. After Ford’s visit, it was said he was not a factor in South Carolina and that the election hinged on approval or disapproval of Carter. Carter himself campaigned more extensively with his eldest son Jack working in the Sixth Congressional District, and other members of his “Peanut Brigade” touring most major population centers.

Among white voters, 55% supported Ford while 44% supported Carter.

=== Predictions ===
Source	Rating	As of
The Atlanta Constitution	Lean R	September 13, 1976
The Charlotte Observer	Likely D (flip)	October 19, 1976
The Times and Democrat	Tilt D (flip)	October 26, 1976
Kansas City Times	Lean D (flip)	October 26, 1976
Daily News	Tossup	October 27, 1976
Sun Herald	Likely D (flip)	October 31, 1976
Austin American-Statesman	Tossup	October 31, 1976

== Results ==
1976 United States presidential election in South Carolina
Party	Candidate	Votes	Percentage	Electoral votes
Democratic	Jimmy Carter	450,825	56.17%	8
Republican	Gerald Ford (incumbent)	346,140	43.13%	0
Independent	Thomas Anderson	2,997	0.37%	0
American	Lester Maddox	1,951	0.24%	0
Write-ins	Write-ins	681 (Note: These write-in votes were not separated by county, but given only as a state-wide total.)	0.08%	0
Totals		802,594	99.99%	8
Voter turnout				–

=== Results by county ===
County	Jimmy Carter Democratic		Gerald Ford Republican		Thomas Anderson Independent		Lester Maddox American		Margin		Total
County	#	%	#	%	#	%	#	%	#	%	Total
Abbeville	4,700	72.06%	1,791	27.46%	19	0.29%	12	0.18%	2,909	44.60%	6,522
Aiken	14,927	47.88%	16,011	51.36%	80	0.26%	155	0.50%	-1,084	-3.48%	31,173
Allendale	2,634	71.02%	1,064	28.69%	4	0.11%	7	0.19%	1,570	42.33%	3,709
Anderson	19,002	66.32%	9,496	33.14%	96	0.34%	60	0.21%	9,506	33.18%	28,654
Bamberg	3,330	63.84%	1,849	35.45%	19	0.36%	18	0.35%	1,481	28.39%	5,216
Barnwell	4,083	61.38%	2,569	38.62%	0	0.00%	0	0.00%	1,514	22.76%	6,652
Beaufort	6,049	50.29%	5,935	49.34%	25	0.21%	20	0.17%	114	0.95%	12,029
Berkeley	9,741	58.05%	6,981	41.60%	27	0.16%	32	0.19%	2,760	16.45%	16,781
Calhoun	2,055	59.29%	1,382	39.87%	22	0.63%	7	0.20%	673	19.42%	3,466
Charleston	34,328	49.64%	34,010	49.18%	445	0.64%	372	0.54%	318	0.46%	69,155
Cherokee	7,765	66.19%	3,931	33.51%	17	0.14%	19	0.16%	3,834	32.68%	11,732
Chester	5,200	63.32%	2,982	36.31%	18	0.22%	12	0.15%	2,218	27.01%	8,212
Chesterfield	7,687	75.04%	2,537	24.77%	11	0.11%	9	0.09%	5,150	50.27%	10,244
Clarendon	5,489	64.13%	3,040	35.52%	14	0.16%	16	0.19%	2,449	28.61%	8,559
Colleton	5,134	60.24%	3,324	39.00%	34	0.40%	30	0.35%	1,810	21.24%	8,522
Darlington	10,165	60.16%	6,678	39.52%	26	0.15%	28	0.17%	3,487	20.64%	16,897
Dillon	5,089	66.62%	2,527	33.08%	10	0.13%	13	0.17%	2,562	33.54%	7,639
Dorchester	8,046	54.44%	6,695	45.30%	19	0.13%	19	0.13%	1,351	9.14%	14,779
Edgefield	3,216	62.60%	1,879	36.58%	17	0.33%	25	0.49%	1,337	26.02%	5,137
Fairfield	4,153	69.36%	1,817	30.34%	11	0.18%	7	0.12%	2,336	39.02%	5,988
Florence	16,294	54.49%	13,539	45.27%	27	0.09%	44	0.15%	2,755	9.22%	29,904
Georgetown	7,169	63.54%	4,058	35.97%	34	0.30%	22	0.19%	3,111	27.57%	11,283
Greenville	35,943	47.31%	39,099	51.46%	796	1.05%	143	0.19%	-3,156	-4.15%	75,981
Greenwood	9,976	62.39%	5,974	37.36%	17	0.11%	24	0.15%	4,002	25.03%	15,991
Hampton	3,923	68.56%	1,773	30.99%	11	0.19%	15	0.26%	2,150	37.57%	5,722
Horry	15,720	62.59%	9,339	37.18%	15	0.06%	43	0.17%	6,381	25.41%	25,117
Jasper	2,903	70.12%	1,221	29.49%	6	0.14%	10	0.24%	1,682	40.63%	4,140
Kershaw	6,211	50.08%	6,126	49.40%	36	0.29%	29	0.23%	85	0.68%	12,402
Lancaster	8,324	62.19%	4,997	37.33%	37	0.28%	27	0.20%	3,327	24.86%	13,385
Laurens	7,440	57.98%	5,300	41.31%	54	0.42%	37	0.29%	2,140	16.67%	12,831
Lee	3,869	61.86%	2,357	37.69%	12	0.19%	16	0.26%	1,512	24.17%	6,254
Lexington	14,339	39.75%	21,442	59.43%	183	0.51%	113	0.31%	-7,103	-19.68%	36,077
Marion	5,927	65.74%	3,076	34.12%	7	0.08%	6	0.07%	2,851	31.62%	9,016
Marlboro	5,409	73.32%	1,961	26.58%	2	0.03%	5	0.07%	3,448	46.74%	7,377
McCormick	1,774	73.09%	640	26.37%	5	0.21%	8	0.33%	1,134	46.72%	2,427
Newberry	5,034	50.26%	4,931	49.23%	24	0.24%	27	0.27%	103	1.03%	10,016
Oconee	8,447	68.61%	3,805	30.90%	41	0.33%	19	0.15%	4,642	37.71%	12,312
Orangeburg	13,652	60.40%	8,794	38.90%	108	0.48%	50	0.22%	4,858	21.50%	22,604
Pickens	8,505	51.07%	8,029	48.21%	95	0.57%	26	0.16%	476	2.86%	16,655
Richland	36,855	52.68%	32,727	46.78%	211	0.30%	169	0.24%	4,128	5.90%	69,962
Saluda	2,715	56.11%	2,085	43.09%	25	0.52%	14	0.29%	630	13.02%	4,839
Spartanburg	27,925	57.32%	20,456	41.99%	223	0.46%	113	0.23%	7,469	15.33%	48,717
Sumter	10,471	52.59%	9,332	46.87%	56	0.28%	53	0.27%	1,139	5.72%	19,912
Union	6,363	64.51%	3,463	35.11%	13	0.13%	24	0.24%	2,900	29.40%	9,863
Williamsburg	8,745	62.22%	5,275	37.53%	10	0.07%	25	0.18%	3,470	24.69%	14,055
York	14,099	58.73%	9,843	41.00%	35	0.15%	28	0.12%	4,256	17.73%	24,005
Totals	450,825	56.17%	346,140	43.13%	2,997	0.37%	1,951	0.24%	104,685	13.04%	802,594

==== Counties that flipped from Republican to Democratic ====
- Allendale
- Beaufort
- Berkeley
- Charleston
- Clarendon
- Dorchester
- Edgefield
- Fairfield
- Florence
- Hampton
- Jasper
- Horry
- Kershaw
- Lee
- McCormick
- Marion
- Marlboro
- Orangeburg
- Newberry
- Pickens
- Richland
- Spartanburg
- Sumter
- Williamsburg
- Abbeville
- Anderson
- Bamberg
- Barnwell
- Calhoun
- Cherokee
- Chester
- Chesterfield
- Colleton
- Darlington
- Dillon
- Georgetown
- Greenwood
- Lancaster
- Laurens
- Oconee
- Saluda
- Union
- York

=== Results by congressional district ===
Carter won all six congressional districts, including one that elected a Republican.

District	Carter	Ford	Representative
1st	53.9%	46.1%	Mendel Jackson Davis
2nd	52.4%	47.6%	Floyd Spence
3rd	58.9%	41.1%	Butler Derrick
4th	51.7%	48.3%	James Mann
5th	60.7%	39.3%	Kenneth Lamar Holland
6th	61.8%	38.2%	John Jenrette

== Works cited ==
- Black, Earl; Black, Merle (1992). The Vital South: How Presidents Are Elected. Harvard University Press. ISBN 0674941306.
