= Cleveland Sellers =

American educator and activist (born 1944)

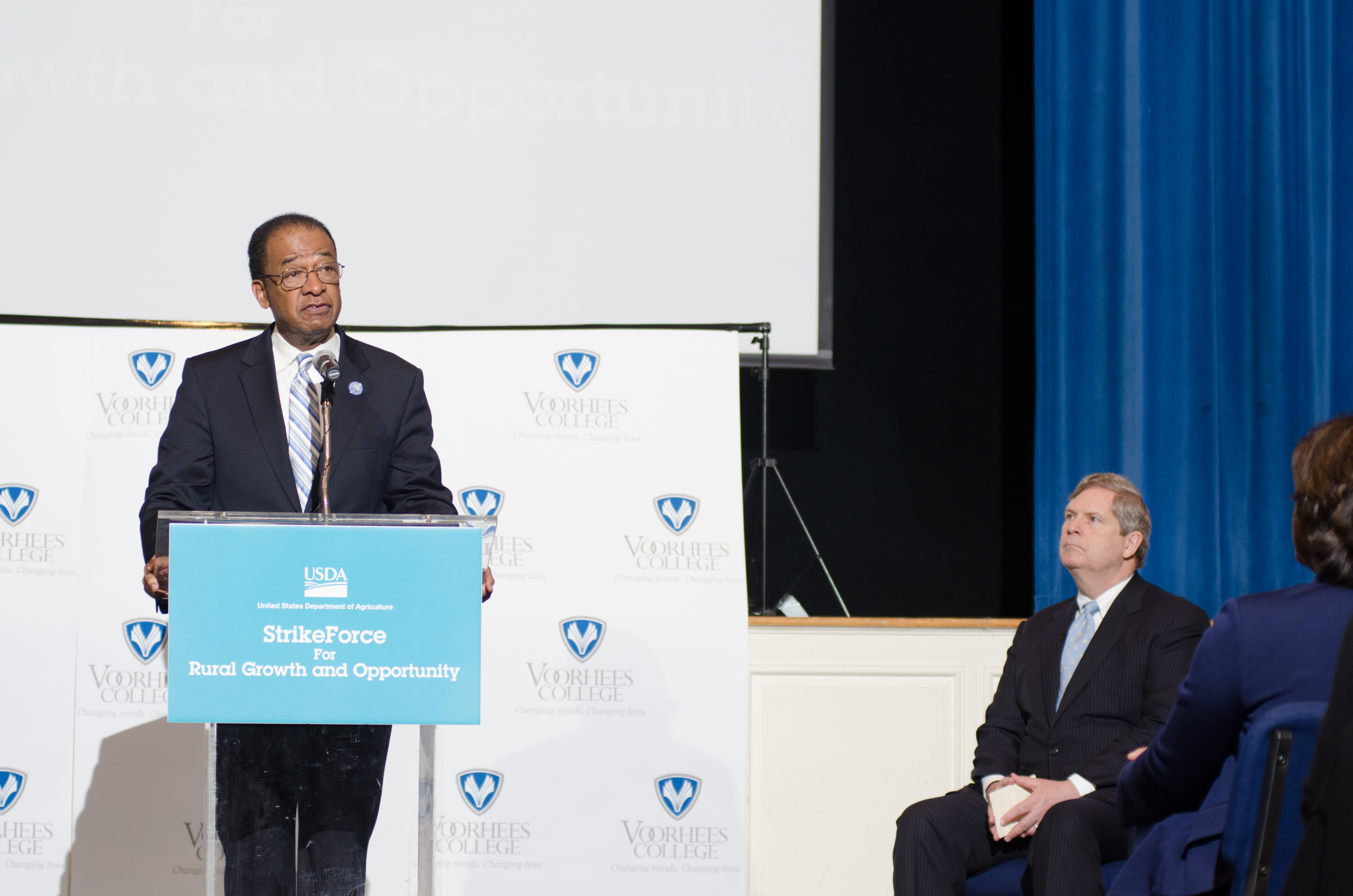

President of Voorhees College
- In office 2008–2015

Personal details
- Born: November 8, 1944 (age 81) Denmark, South Carolina, U.S.
- Children: 3, including Bakari
- Education: Shaw University (BA); Harvard University (EdM); University of North Carolina-Greensboro (EdD)

Cleveland "Cleve" Sellers Jr. (born November 8, 1944) is an American educator and civil rights activist. During the Civil Rights Movement, he helped lead the Student Nonviolent Coordinating Committee. He was the only person convicted and jailed for events at the Orangeburg Massacre, a 1968 civil rights protest in which three students were killed by state troopers. Sellers' conviction and the acquittal of the other nine defendants were believed to be motivated by racism. He received a full pardon 25 years after the incident.

Sellers is the former Director of the African American Studies Program at the University of South Carolina. He served as president of Voorhees College, a historically black college in South Carolina, from 2008 to 2015.

== Early life ==
Sellers was born in Denmark, South Carolina, to Cleveland Sellers (Sr.) and Pauline Sellers. Denmark was a town of mostly black residents, so much so, that as a child, Sellers was often blind to the privilege of whites. He said, "as far as I was concerned, white people didn't constitute a threat or deterrent to anything I wanted to be or accomplish." In the late 1940s, under the segregated South Carolina school system, the county arranged for black children to go to what was then called the Voorhees School and Junior College, which was founded by Elizabeth Evelyn Wright. Sellers began attending Voorhees when he was three and served as its mascot. He remained at the school through 12th grade, graduating in 1962.

During childhood, Sellers had a close relationship with his parents, especially his mother. He admired her care for the community and said he grew up "under her wing." He was active in the Boy Scouts of America and went to the 1960 National Scout jamboree in Colorado Springs, Colorado. His family were members of the St. Philip's Episcopal Chapel, also located on the Voorhees College campus.

When Sellers later traced his awakening to the civil rights struggle, he mentioned being shaken deeply at age ten by the murder of Emmett Till: "I couldn't see a difference between the two of us." As a young teenager, he participated in summer retreats with his church where they discussed racial inequality in America. He was also inspired by the 1960 sit-ins in the South and soon dedicated himself to student-led protesting. In 1960, two weeks after the Greensboro sit-ins and while still only 15 years old, he organized a similar protest at a lunch counter in downtown Denmark.

== Civil rights activism ==
In 1962, Sellers enrolled in Howard University. After the 1960 protests, his father had forbidden him from jeopardizing himself by engaging in further radical action. Nevertheless, Sellers joined the Nonviolent Action Group (NAG) where he met Stokely Carmichael, who inspired Sellers as he was a like-minded student and prominent in the campus movement. Carmichael's house served as NAG headquarters, where Malcolm X spoke to students about black nationalism, while also criticizing Martin Luther King Jr. for insufficient militancy. Shortly before the 1963 the March on Washington, the event's organizer Bayard Rustin contacted NAG and asked them to supply what they could to aid the marchers. Sellers and others provided signs and food that day. As he walked through the crowds at the march, he said he could hear Malcolm X's message in his ear.

In 1964, Sellers became involved with the Student Non-Violent Coordinating Committee (SNCC). The organization had been founded by students in 1960. Sellers was a spiritually disciplined person, who took an "oath of poverty" after joining SNCC, and forsook education, family and pleasures of student life to focus on the movement. He was quickly assigned to Holly Springs, Mississippi, to coordinate voting registration and advocate for the Mississippi Freedom Democratic Party. He and his colleagues encountered intense racism there. When they returned home, they felt dejected as though nothing had been accomplished. When Sellers was elected SNCC's program director the next year, he took action to revise the direction of the organization.

He thought the current SNCC tactics were not working, that the goals were too abstract, and he wanted instead for the organization to pursue focused, achievable goals. Many SNCC members did not like his hard crack-down within the organization, but Sellers believed it to be the best way to make necessary changes. Other SNCC members, especially Carmichael, began advocating for black power. Sellers preached, and continues to preach, that the idea of black power was never meant to undermine white people, but simply was a concept meant to empower and celebrate the black community. Still, many white Americans saw black power as an ideology advocating black superiority. By 1967, it had a largely negative reputation in the country. Although SNCC ended up having many critics and eventually disbanding, the black power concept sent a "wake up call" to America and helped the black community express its sense of pride.

In 1966, Sellers was one of the first SNCC leaders to refuse to be drafted into the U.S. military as a protest against the Vietnam War. His refusal became part of a larger resistance that year by SNCC to allowing black men to fight in what was viewed as an unjust war against other people of color.

In 1967, Sellers graduated from Shaw University in Raleigh, North Carolina with a Bachelor of Arts degree in liberal studies. He then returned to South Carolina, feeling emotionally drained from his time with SNCC.

== Orangeburg Massacre ==
On February 8, 1968, approximately 200 protesters gathered on the campus of South Carolina State University (in the city of Orangeburg) to protest the de facto segregation of the All Star Bowling Lane. Now called All-Star Triangle Bowl, it was a bowling alley on Russell Street, owned by local businessman Harry K. Floyd. Sellers was at a friend's house when he was alerted of the chaos outside. Upon going outdoors, he began walking through the mass of student protestors. The surrounding police officers perceived the rowdiness of the crowd as an attack and fired into the crowd, killing three young men: Samuel Hammond, all-state basketball player Delano Middleton, and Henry Smith, and wounding 27 others. Sellers was shot in the left shoulder and fell to the ground.

Then Governor Robert Evander McNair blamed "outside Black Power agitators", but subsequent investigations showed this allegation was without basis.

The ensuing trial, billed as the first federal trial of police officers for using excessive force at a campus protest, led to the acquittal of all nine defendants. Authorities tried to build a case against Sellers claiming he was the instigator. While awaiting criminal trial, Sellers was released on bond and went to Atlanta, out of fear of not being safe at home.

In the fall of 1970, Sellers was convicted of not dispersing when ordered to, and was sentenced to a year in prison. Sellers was the only individual imprisoned as a result of the incident. He served approximately seven months in prison after a conviction for inciting to riot. He began serving his sentence in February 1973. On August 31, 1973, Sellers would be granted a release five months early for good behavior, with prison officials describing him as a "model prisoner." It's believed that Sellers was legally targeted in the initiation of the massacre, having been known as a staunch civil rights advocate and former SNCC leader. Some suggested that he may also have been the target of an assassination plot during the massacre, although this is factually unfounded.

During his imprisonment he wrote his autobiography, The River of No Return, chronicling his involvement with the civil rights movement. On July 20, 1993, Sellers received a full pardon, 25 years after the Orangeburg Massacre, but he chose not to have his record expunged, keeping it as a "badge of honor." The South Carolina Board of Probation, Paroles and Pardons would grant his pardon in a unanimous vote. Sellers said that receiving a pardon "closed a chapter" in his life.

== Later life ==
After his release from prison, Sellers earned a Master's degree in education from Harvard University in 1970. He ran unsuccessfully for office in Greensboro, North Carolina, while aiding the 1984 presidential campaign of Reverend Jesse Jackson. Sellers obtained his EdD degree in history at the University of North Carolina at Greensboro in 1987.

He served as director of the African American Studies Program at the University of South Carolina. His scholarly interests include recording the history of protest tradition, civil rights history, and the experiences of Africans in the diaspora. He focuses on the oral history of African Americans who shaped the history of South Carolina, including cultural groupings and the languages of Gullah, Creole, and Geechee. He also has studied the survival experiences of African Americans, sometimes recorded in folklore but often unrecorded.

In 1989, Seller's parents were aging and he and his family moved back to Denmark, South Carolina, to be with them. In 2008, Sellers was selected the eighth president of Voorhees College in Denmark, South Carolina, where he had graduated from high school. In September 2015, Sellers reluctantly stepped down as president because of a heart condition. During his tenure, he helped increase enrollment at the historically black college.

Sellers has two sons and a daughter. His younger son is former South Carolina state Rep. Bakari T. Sellers (born September 18, 1984). At the age of 22, B. T. Sellers was one of the youngest state lawmakers in the United States when he was first elected in November 2006.

== See also ==
- Timeline of the civil rights movement
