= List of Sigma Gamma Rho chapters =

Sigma Gamma Rho is an international historically African American sorority that was founded in 1922 in Indianapolis, Indiana.

== Active Chapters ==
In the following list of chapters, active chapters are indicated in bold and inactive chapters are in italics.

| Chapter | Charter date and range | Institution | Location | Status | Ref. |
|---|---|---|---|---|---|
| **Alpha** | December 30, 1929 – 1952; 19xx ? | Butler University | Indianapolis, Indiana | Active | (Note: Chapter was formed in Indianapolis, Indiana and later moved to the Butler campus.) |
| Beta First | 1923–1931 | Indiana State University | Terre Haute, Indiana | Reissued | |
| **Beta** | 1948 | University of the District of Columbia | Washington, D.C. | Active | |
| Gamma First | 1923 | Atlanta University | Atlanta, Georgia | Reissued | |
| **Gamma** | 1951 | North Carolina A&T State University | Greensboro, North Carolina | Active | |
| Delta First | 192x ?–19xx ? | Louisville Municipal College | Louisville, Kentucky | Reissued | |
| **Delta** | 1941–1952; April 2, 2000 | Xavier University of Louisiana | New Orleans, Louisiana | Active | |
| **Epsilon** | 1924–19xx ?, 1966 | Indiana University Northwest | Gary, Indiana | Active | (Note: Formed as a citywide chapter but later spun off the alumnae chapter, Alpha Sigma Sigma.) |
| **Zeta** | 1929 | Case Western Reserve University | Cleveland, Ohio | Active | |
| **Eta** | December 14, 1927 – 2004; December 3, 2014 | Northwestern University | Evanston, Illinois | Active | |
| Theta First | 1928 –19xx ? | Texas Southern University | Houston, Texas | Reissued | |
| **Theta** | December 17, 1949 | Claflin University | Orangeburg, South Carolina | Active | |
| Iota First | 192x ?–19xx ? | | | Reissued | |
| **Iota** | 1941–1952, 19xx ? | Langston University | Langston, Oklahoma | Active | |
| **Kappa** | April 21, 1923 – 19xx; 1971 | Wilberforce University | Wilberforce, Ohio | Active | |
| Lambda First | 192x ?–19xx ? | | | Reissued | |
| **Lambda** | 1947–1953, 19xx ? | Kentucky State University | Frankfort, Kentucky | Active | |
| Mu First | 192x ?–19xx? | | | Reissued | |
| **Mu** | October 24, 1946 – 1952, 19xx ? | Ball State University | Muncie, Indiana | Active | |
| Nu First | 192x ?–19xx ? | | | Reissued | |
| **Nu** | 1950 | St. Augustine's University | Raleigh, North Carolina | Active | |
| Xi First | 192x ?–19xx ? | | | Reissued | |
| **Xi** | April 23, 1994 | Francis Marion University | Florence, South Carolina | Active | |
| Omicron First | 192x ?–19xx ? | | | Reissued | |
| **Omicron** | November 22, 1940 | Dillard University | New Orleans, Louisiana | Active | |
| Pi | 19xx ?–19xx ? | | | Inactive | |
| Rho First | 19xx ?–19xx ? | Brick Junior College | Enfield, NC | Reissued | |
| **Rho** | March 31, 1951 | Winston-Salem State University | Winston-Salem, North Carolina | Active | |
| Sigma | | | | Inactive | |
| **Tau** | 1927 | Virginia Union University | Richmond, Virginia | Active | |
| Upsilon | 1930–1941 | | Lovejoy, Illinois | Inactive | (Note: Chapter closed when it became the graduate chapter, Alpha Upsilon Sigma of East Saint Louis, Illinois.) |
| Phi First | 193x ?–19xx ? | | | Reissued | |
| **Phi** | 1952 | Clark Atlanta University | Atlanta, Georgia | Active | |
| Chi First | 193x ?–19xx ? | | | Reissued | |
| **Chi** | April 1970–1973, 19xx ? | Wichita State University | Wichita, Kansas | Active | |
| Psi (see **Nu Psi**) | 1938–19xx ? | Southern Illinois University Carbondale | Carbondale, Illinois | Inactive | (Note: Chapter was reestablished as Nu Psi in 1968.) |
| Omega | 193x ?–19xx ? | | | Inactive | |
| Alpha Alpha | | | | Inactive | |
| **Alpha Beta** | 193x ?–19xx ?; 1942 | Tennessee State University | Nashville, Tennessee | Active | |
| Alpha Gamma | 1932 | Lane College | Jackson, Tennessee | Active | |
| **Alpha Delta** | 1937 | Harris–Stowe State University | St. Louis, Missouri | Active | |
| Alpha Epsilon First | 193x ?–19xx ? | | | Reissued | |
| **Alpha Epsilon** | 1946 | Florida A&M University | Tallahassee, Florida | Active | |
| **Alpha Zeta** | 1938 | Virginia State University | Ettrick, Virginia | Active | |
| **Alpha Eta** | 1938–1946, 1953 | Wayne State University | Detroit, Michigan | Active | |
| Alpha Theta | 1936–1941, 1950–1954 | Illinois Institute of Technology | Chicago, Illinois | Inactive | (Note: Chapter formed at the Lewis Institute which later became the Illinois Institute of Technology.) |
| Alpha Iota First | 193x ?–19xx ? | | | Reissued | |
| **Alpha Iota** | 1949 | Savannah State University | Savannah, Georgia | Active | |
| Alpha Kappa | 193x ? | | | Inactive | |
| **Alpha Lambda** | 1928 | Texas Southern University | Houston, Texas | Active | |
| **Alpha Mu** | 1937 | Lincoln University | Jefferson City, Missouri | Active | |
| **Alpha Nu** | 1950 | Los Angeles Areawide | Los Angeles, California | Active | |
| **Alpha Xi** | 1943 | Philander Smith College | Little Rock, Arkansas | Active | |
| **Alpha Omicron** | December 23, 1937 | LeMoyne–Owen College | Memphis, Tennessee | Active | |
| **Alpha Pi** | 1938 | New York City Areawide | New York City, New York | Active | |
| Alpha Rho First | 1941–1954 | YMCA College, Chicago | Chicago, Illinois | Inactive | |
| **Alpha Rho** | 1973 | University of Missouri | Columbia, Missouri | Active | |
| **Alpha Tau** | March 14, 1941 – 1944; 1948 | Jackson State University | Jackson, Mississippi | Active | |
| **Alpha Upsilon** | 1945–1952, 1972 | Fisk University | Nashville, Tennessee | Active | |
| **Alpha Phi** | April 28, 1939 | Howard University | Washington, D.C. | Active | |
| **Alpha Chi** | 1944 | University of Arkansas at Pine Bluff | Pine Bluff, Arkansas | Active | |
| **Alpha Psi** | 1935 | Saint Louis University | St. Louis, Missouri | Active | |
| **Alpha Omega** | 1945 | Huston–Tillotson University | Austin, Texas | Active | |
| **Beta Alpha** | 1945 | Southern University | Baton Rouge, Louisiana | Active | |
| Beta Beta First (see **Epsilon Tau**) | 1946–1952 | Alcorn State University | Lorman, Mississippi | Reissued | (Note: Chapter was reestablished as Epsilon Tau chapter in 1972.) |
| **Beta Beta** | 1971 | Indiana State University | Terre Haute, Indiana | Active | |
| **Beta Gamma** | 1946–1947, 1972 | Wiley College | Marshall, Texas | Active | |
| **Beta Delta** | 1947 | Temple University | Philadelphia, Pennsylvania | Active | |
| **Beta Epsilon** | 1947 | Benedict College | Columbia, South Carolina | Active | |
| Beta Zeta | 19xx ?–19xx ? | | | Inactive | |
| **Beta Eta** | 1950 | Bethune–Cookman University | Daytona Beach, Florida | Active | |
| **Beta Theta** | 1950 | Shaw University | Raleigh, North Carolina | Active | |
| **Beta Iota** | 1950 | Allen University | Columbia, South Carolina | Active | |
| **Beta Kappa** | 1961–1953, 1960 | Texas College | Tyler, Texas | Active | |
| **Beta Lambda** | 1952 | Morris Brown College | Atlanta, Georgia | Active | |
| Beta Mu | 195x ?–19xx ? | | | Inactive | |
| **Beta Nu** | 1952 | Saint Paul College | Saint Paul, Minnesota | Active | |
| Beta Xi | 195x ?–19xx ? | | | Inactive | |
| **Beta Omicron** | 1952 | North Carolina Central University | Durham, North Carolina | Active | |
| **Beta Pi** | 1952 | Arizona State University | Tempe, Arizona | Active | |
| **Beta Rho** | September 25, 1954 | Roosevelt University | Chicago, Illinois | Active | |
| **Beta Tau** | 1954 | Morgan State University | Baltimore, Maryland | Active | |
| **Beta Upsilon** | 1955 | Johnson C. Smith University | Charlotte, North Carolina | Active | |
| **Beta Phi** | 1957 | Cheyney University of Pennsylvania | Cheyney, Pennsylvania | Active | |
| **Beta Chi** | 1958 | Alabama State University | Montgomery, Alabama | Active | |
| **Beta Psi** | 1958 | University of California, Berkeley | Berkeley, California | Active | |
| **Beta Omega** | 1960 | Grambling State University | Grambling, Louisiana | Active | |
| **Gamma Alpha** | 1960 | Monrovia, Liberia | Monrovia, Liberia | Active | |
| **Gamma Beta** | July 29, 1961 | Southern Illinois University Edwardsville | Edwardsville, Illinois | Active | |
| **Gamma Gamma** | 1962 | Knoxville College | Knoxville, Tennessee | Active | |
| Gamma Delta | 1962–19xx ? | Bishop College | Marshall, Texas | Inactive | |
| **Gamma Epsilon** | 1973 | Kent State University | Kent, Ohio | Active | |
| **Gamma Zeta** | April 6, 1963 – 19xx ?; December 19, 1998 | Indiana University–Purdue University Indianapolis | Indianapolis, Indiana | Active | (Note: Although chartered at IUPUI, Gamma Zeta chapter operates as a citywide chapter and also serves Marian University, Martin University, and the University of Indianapolis.) |
| **Gamma Eta** | 1965 | Oklahoma City Areawide | Oklahoma City, Oklahoma | Active | |
| **Gamma Theta** | 1963 | Newark Citywide | Newark, New Jersey | Active | |
| **Gamma Iota** | 1964 | Paul Quinn College | Dallas, Texas | Active | |
| **Gamma Kappa** | June 14, 1968 | California State University, Long Beach | Long Beach, California | Active | |
| Gamma Lambda | 196x?–19xx ? | | | Inactive | |
| **Gamma Mu** | 1964 | Baltimore Areawide | Baltimore, Maryland | Active | |
| **Gamma Nu** | 1964 | Norfolk State University | Norfolk, Virginia | Active | |
| **Gamma Xi** | 1964 | Florida Memorial University | Miami Gardens, Florida | Active | |
| **Gamma Omicron** | 1966 | Denver Areawide | Denver, Colorado | Active | |
| **Gamma Pi** | 1965 | Louisiana State University | Baton Rouge, Louisiana | Active | |
| **Gamma Rho** | 1973 | Illinois State University | Normal, Illinois | Active | |
| **Gamma Tau** | 1967 | Little Rock Citywide | Little Rock, Arkansas | Active | |
| **Gamma Upsilon** | 1968 | Southern University at New Orleans | New Orleans, Louisiana | Active | |
| **Gamma Phi** | 1968 | Coppin State University | Baltimore, Maryland | Active | |
| **Gamma Chi** | August 17, 1968 | University of Memphis | Memphis, Tennessee | Active | |
| **Gamma Psi** | August 2, 1969 | Emporia State University | Emporia, Kansas | Active | |
| **Gamma Omega** | 1968 | Michigan State University | East Lansing, Michigan | Active | |
| **Delta Alpha** | 1969 | Prairie View A&M University | Prairie View, Texas | Active | |
| **Delta Beta** | 1971 | Eastern Illinois University | Charleston, Illinois | Active | |
| **Delta Gamma** | June 5, 1970 | San Diego State University | San Diego, California | Active | |
| Delta Delta | 197x ?–19xx ? | | | Inactive | |
| **Delta Epsilon** | 1970–1973, 19xx ? | Eastern Michigan University | Ypsilanti, Michigan | Active | |
| **Delta Zeta** | 1970 | Ferris State University | Big Rapids, Michigan | Active | |
| **Delta Eta** | 1970 | Miles College | Fairfield, Alabama | Active | |
| Delta Theta | 197x?–19xx ? | | | Inactive | |
| **Delta Iota** | 1970 | Fayetteville State University | Fayetteville, North Carolina | Active | |
| **Delta Kappa** | 1970 | Truman State University | Kirksville, Missouri | Active | |
| **Delta Lambda** | 1971 | Shreveport Citywide | Shreveport, Louisiana | Active | |
| **Delta Mu** | 1973 | University of Oregon | Eugene, Oregon | Active | |
| **Delta Nu** | May 30, 1970 | University of Minnesota | Minneapolis and Saint Paul, Minnesota | Active | |
| **Delta Xi** | 1971 | Barber–Scotia College | Concord, North Carolina | Active | |
| **Delta Omicron** | 1970 | Paine College | Augusta, Georgia | Active | |
| **Delta Pi** | 1970 | University of Central Missouri | Warrensburg, Missouri | Active | |
| **Delta Rho** | March 8, 1969 | University of Illinois Urbana-Champaign | Champaign, Illinois | Active | |
| **Delta Tau** | 1970 | Elizabeth City State University | Elizabeth City, North Carolina | Active | |
| **Delta Upsilon** | 1971 | Edward Waters University | Jacksonville, Florida | Active | |
| **Delta Phi** | 1971 | Ohio State University | Columbus, Ohio | Active | |
| **Delta Chi** | 1972 | Talladega College | Talladega, Alabama | Active | |
| **Delta Psi** | 1972 | Tallahassee Citywide | Tallahassee, Florida | Active | |
| **Delta Omega** | 1971 | Central State University | Wilberforce, Ohio | Active | |
| Epsilon Alpha | 197x ?–xxxx ? | | | Inactive | |
| **Epsilon Beta** | 1972 | Western Illinois University | Macomb, Illinois | Active | |
| **Epsilon Gamma** | 1972 | Purdue University | West Lafayette, Indiana | Active | |
| **Epsilon Delta** | 1972 | Florida State University | Tallahassee, Florida | Active | |
| Epsilon Epsilon | 197x ?–xxxx ? | | | Inactive | |
| **Epsilon Zeta** | 1972 | Virginia Commonwealth University | Richmond, Virginia | Active | |
| **Epsilon Eta** | 1973 | Spelman College | Atlanta, Georgia | Active | |
| **Epsilon Theta** | 1972 | Tuskegee University | Tuskegee, Alabama | Active | |
| **Epsilon Iota** | 1976 | Nebraska Wesleyan University | Lincoln, Nebraska | Active | |
| Epsilon Kappa | 197x ?–xxxx ? | | | Inactive | |
| **Epsilon Lambda** | 1973 | Bowie State University | Prince George's County, Maryland | Active | |
| **Epsilon Mu** | 1973 | Compton Areawide | Compton, California | Active | |
| **Epsilon Mu** | 1979 | San Antonio Areawide | San Antonio, Texas | Active | |
| Epsilon Nu | 197x ?–xxxx ? | | | Inactive | |
| **Epsilon Xi** | 1973 | University of Wisconsin–Madison | Madison, Wisconsin | Active | |
| Epsilon Omicron | 1973–2008 | San Jose State University | San Jose, California | Inactive | (Note: In 2008, San Jose State suspended this chapter until 2016 for hazing.) |
| **Epsilon Pi** | 1972 | University of Houston | Houston, Texas | Active | |
| **Epsilon Rho** | 1978 | University of Akron | Akron, Ohio | Active | |
| **Epsilon Tau** (see Beta Beta First) | 1972 | Alcorn State University | Lorman, Mississippi | Active | (Note: This reestablished the defunct Beta Beta first chapter.) |
| Epsilon Upsilon | 197x ?–xxxx ? | | | Inactive | |
| **Epsilon Phi** | November 18, 1973 | California State University, Northridge | Los Angeles, California | Active | |
| **Epsilon Chi** | 1971 | Indiana University Bloomington | Bloomington, Indiana | Active | |
| Epsilon Psi | 197x ?–xxxx ? | | | Inactive | |
| **Epsilon Omega** | 1974 | University of Wisconsin–Whitewater | Whitewater, Wisconsin | Active | |
| **Zeta Alpha** | 1973 | Bowling Green State University | Bowling Green, Ohio | Active | |
| Zeta Beta | 197x ?–xxxx ? | | | Inactive | |
| Zeta Gamma | 197x ?–xxxx ? | | | Inactive | |
| **Zeta Delta** | 1974 | Delaware State University | Dover, Delaware | Active | |
| **Zeta Epsilon** | 1974 | Louisiana Tech University | Ruston, Louisiana | Active | |
| Zeta Zeta | 197x ?–xxxx ? | | | Inactive | |
| Zeta Eta | 197x ?–xxxx ? | | | Inactive | |
| **Zeta Theta** | 1974 | University of South Carolina | Columbia, South Carolina | Active | |
| **Zeta Iota** | 1976 | Chattanooga Areawide | Chattanooga, Tennessee | Active | |
| **Zeta Kappa** | 1974 | South Carolina State University | Orangeburg, South Carolina | Active | |
| **Zeta Lambda** | 1975 | University of St. Thomas | Houston, Texas | Active | |
| **Zeta Mu** | 1974 | Lewis University | Romeoville, Illinois | Active | |
| **Zeta Nu** | 1975 | Northern Illinois University | DeKalb, Illinois | Active | |
| **Zeta Xi** | 1975 | Hampton University | Hampton, Virginia | Active | |
| **Zeta Omicron** | 1976 | West Virginia State University | Institute, West Virginia | Active | |
| **Zeta Pi** | April 14, 1975 | Fort Valley State University | Fort Valley, Georgia | Active | |
| **Zeta Rho** | 1976 | Northwest Missouri State University | Maryville, Missouri | Active | |
| **Zeta Tau** | 1975 | Beaumont Citywide | Beaumont, Texas | Active | |
| **Zeta Upsilon** | 1976 | University of Northern Colorado | Greeley, Colorado | Active | |
| **Zeta Phi** | 1975 | Bradley University | Peoria, Illinois | Active | |
| **Zeta Chi** | 1975 | University of Alabama | Tuscaloosa, Alabama | Active | |
| **Zeta Psi** | 1975 | Albany State University | Albany, Georgia | Active | |
| Zeta Omega | 197x ?–xxxx ? | | | Inactive | |
| **Eta Alpha** | 1976–1981, 1991 | University of North Texas | Denton, Texas | Active | |
| **Eta Beta** | April 3, 1976 | University of Maryland, College Park | College Park, Maryland | Active | |
| Eta Gamma | 197x ?–xxxx ? | | | Inactive | |
| **Eta Delta** | 1977 | University of California, San Diego | San Diego, California | Active | |
| **Eta Epsilon** | 1976 | Western Michigan University | Kalamazoo, Michigan | Active | |
| **Eta Zeta** | 1977 | University of Wisconsin–Milwaukee | Milwaukee, Wisconsin | Active | |
| Eta Eta | 197x ?–xxxx ? | | | InActive | |
| Eta Theta | 197x ?–xxxx ? | | | Inactive | |
| **Eta Iota** | 1976 | University of Kansas | Lawrence, Kansas | Active | |
| **Eta Kappa** | 1977 | Stillman College | Tuscaloosa, Alabama | Active | |
| **Eta Lambda** | 1977 | California State University, Bakersfield | Bakersfield, California | Active | |
| **Eta Mu** | 1977 | East Carolina University | Greenville, North Carolina | Active | |
| **Eta Nu** | 1979 | Texas Woman's University | Denton, Texas | Active | |
| **Eta Xi** | 1977 | Towson University | Towson, Maryland | Active | |
| **Eta Omicron** | 1977 | Voorhees University | Denmark, South Carolina | Active | |
| **Eta Pi** | 1977 | Saginaw Valley State University | University Center, Michigan | Active | |
| **Eta Rho** | 1978 | Knoxville Citywide | Knoxville, Tennessee | Active | |
| **Eta Tau** | 1978 | University of Southern Mississippi | Hattiesburg, Mississippi | Active | |
| Eta Upsilon | 1978–2010 | Rutgers University–New Brunswick | New Brunswick, New Jersey | Inactive | (Note: Rutgers and the national sorority suspended this chapter in 2010 for hazing.) |
| **Eta Phi** | 1978 | Western Kentucky University | Bowling Green, Kentucky | Active | |
| **Eta Chi** | 1976 | Purdue University Northwest | Hammond, Indiana | Active | |
| **Eta Psi** | 1980 | Ohio University | Athens, Ohio | Active | |
| **Eta Omega** | 1979 | University of Louisville | Louisville, Kentucky | Active | |
| **Theta Alpha** | 1979 | University of Wisconsin–Oshkosh | Oshkosh, Wisconsin | Active | |
| Theta Beta | 19xx ?–xxxx ? | | | InActive | |
| **Theta Gamma** | March 29, 1980 | Tougaloo College | Jackson, Mississippi | Active | |
| **Theta Delta** | 1980 | Galveston Citywide | Galveston, Texas | Active | |
| **Theta Epsilon** | May 9, 1980 | University of Southern California | Los Angeles, California | Active | |
| **Theta Zeta** | 1980 | Marquette University | Milwaukee, Wisconsin | Active | |
| **Theta Eta** | 1981 | Drake University | Des Moines, Iowa | Active | |
| Theta Theta | 198x ?–xxxx ? | | | Inactive | |
| Theta Iota | 198x ?–xxxx ? | | | Inactive | |
| **Theta Kappa** | 1980 | Baldwin Wallace University | Berea, Ohio | Active | |
| **Theta Lambda** | 1980 | University of Virginia | Charlottesville, Virginia | Active | |
| **Theta Mu** | 1980 | Rowan University | Glassboro, New Jersey | Active | |
| **Theta Nu** | 1980 | University of Pittsburgh | Pittsburgh, Pennsylvania | Active | |
| **Omega Tau** | 1980 | Houston Areawide | Houston, Texas | Active | |
| **Psi Delta** | 1981 | Seattle Areawide | Seattle, Washington | Active | |
| **Theta Xi** | 1981 | University of Nebraska Omaha | Omaha, Nebraska | Active | |
| **Theta Omicron** | 1981 | University of Delaware | Newark, Delaware | Active | |
| **Theta Pi** | 1981 | University of Central Oklahoma | Edmond, Oklahoma | Active | |
| **Theta Rho** | 1981 | Cleveland State University | Cleveland, Ohio | Active | |
| **Theta Tau** | 1981 | Syracuse University | Syracuse, New York | Active | |
| **Theta Upsilon** | 1981 | University of South Florida | Tampa, Florida | Active | |
| **Theta Phi** | 1982 | Mississippi State University | Starkville, Mississippi | Active | |
| **Theta Chi** | 1982 | Old Dominion University | Norfolk, Virginia | Active | |
| **Theta Psi** | 1982 | Iowa State University | Ames, Iowa | Active | |
| **Theta Omega** | 1982 | Stockton University | Galloway Township, New Jersey | Active | |
| Iota Alpha | | | | Unassigned ? | |
| Iota Beta | | | | Unassigned ? | |
| **Iota Gamma** | 1980 | Longview Citywide | Longview, Texas | Active | |
| Iota Epsilon | | | | Unassigned ? | |
| **Iota Zeta** | 1982 | University of Missouri–Kansas City | Kansas City, Missouri | Active | |
| **Iota Eta** | 1983 | Morris College | Sumter, South Carolina | Active | |
| Iota Theta | | | | Unassigned ? | |
| Iota Iota | | | | Unassigned ? | |
| Iota Kappa | | | | Unassigned ? | |
| Iota Lambda | | | | Unassigned ? | |
| Iota Mu | | | | Unassigned ? | |
| Iota Nu | | | | Unassigned ? | |
| Iota Xi | | | | Unassigned ? | |
| Iota Omicron | | | | Unassigned ? | |
| Iota Pi | | | | Unassigned ? | |
| Iota Rho | | | | Unassigned ? | |
| Iota Tau | | | | Unassigned ? | |
| Iota Upsilon | | | | Unassigned ? | |
| Iota Phi | | | | Unassigned ? | |
| Iota Chi | | | | Unassigned ? | |
| **Iota Psi** | April 12, 1980 | University of Michigan | Ann Arbor, Michigan | Active | |
| Iota Omicron | | | | Unassigned ? | |
| Kappa Alpha | 198x ?–xxxx ? | | | Inactive | |
| **Kappa Beta** | 1982 | Bakers | | Active | |
| **Kappa Gamma** | 1986 | University of Tennessee at Martin | Martin, Tennessee | Active | |
| **Kappa Delta** | 1983 | Marshall University | Huntington, West Virginia | Active | |
| **Kappa Epsilon** | 1983 | LIU Brooklyn | Brooklyn, New York | Active | |
| **Kappa Zeta** | 1983 | Texas Tech University | Lubbock, Texas | Active | |
| **Kappa Eta** | 1983 | University of Iowa | Iowa City, Iowa | Active | |
| **Kappa Theta** | 1986 | University of Louisiana at Monroe | Monroe, Louisiana | Active | |
| **Kappa Iota** | 1987 | Alabama A&M University | Normal, Alabama | Active | |
| Kappa Kappa | 198x ?–xxxx ? | | | Inactive | |
| **Kappa Lambda** | 1983 | Indiana University of Pennsylvania | Indiana County, Pennsylvania | Active | |
| **Kappa Mu** | 1984 | Sam Houston State University | Huntsville, Texas | Active | |
| **Kappa Nu** | April 27, 1984 – 198x ?; November 17, 1989 | Northeastern University | Boston, Massachusetts | Active | (Note: Chapter was originally Boston Metro and served Northeastern University, Emmanuel College, Boston College, Boston University, Tufts University, Suffolk University, Wellesley College, Salem State College, Framingham State College, and Worcester State College. In 2008, it divided into three separate campuses, with Northeastern University keeping the chapter name.) |
| **Kappa Xi** | 1987 | State University of New York at Old Westbury | Old Westbury, New York | Active | |
| **Kappa Omicron** | 1987 | State University of New York at New Paltz | New Paltz, New York | Active | |
| **Kappa Pi** | 1987 | Buffalo State University | Buffalo, New York | Active | |
| **Kappa Rho** | December 12, 1987 | Pennsylvania State University | University Park, Pennsylvania | Active | |
| **Kappa Tau** | 1983 | Tulsa Areawide | Tulsa, Oklahoma | Active | |
| **Kappa Upsilon** | 1972 | Jarvis Christian University | Wood County, Texas | Active | |
| **Kappa Phi** | 1985 | University of California, Davis | Davis, California | Active | |
| **Kappa Chi** | 1985 | Mississippi Valley State University | Mississippi Valley State, Mississippi | Active | |
| **Kappa Psi** | 1985 | Virginia Tech | Blacksburg, Virginia | Active | |
| **Kappa Omega** | 1987 | North Carolina State University | Raleigh, North Carolina | Active | |
| **Lambda Alpha** | 1988 | Millersville University of Pennsylvania | Millersville, Pennsylvania | Active | |
| **Lambda Beta** | 1988 | Valdosta State University | Valdosta, Georgia | Active | |
| **Lambda Gamma** | 1988 | West Virginia University | Morgantown, West Virginia | Active | |
| **Lambda Delta** | 1988 | University of Georgia | Athens, Georgia | Active | |
| **Lambda Epsilon** | 1989 | University of West Georgia | Carrollton, Georgia | Active | |
| **Lambda Zeta** | May 8, 1989 | Binghamton University | Binghamton, New York | Active | |
| **Lambda Eta** | 1989 | Southeast Missouri State University | Cape Girardeau, Missouri | Active | |
| **Lambda Theta** | 1989 | Northwestern State University | Natchitoches, Louisiana | Active | |
| **Lambda Iota** | 1989 | James Madison University | Harrisonburg, Virginia | Active | |
| **Lambda Kappa** | 1989 | Winthrop University | Rock Hill, South Carolina | Active | |
| **Lambda Lambda** | 1990 | East Texas A&M University | Commerce, Texas | Active | (Note: Texas A&M University at Commerce changed its name to East Texas A&M University on 7 November 2024.) |
| **Lambda Mu** | 1990 | University of Central Florida | Orlando, Florida | Active | |
| **Lambda Nu** | 1991 | Stephen F. Austin State University | Nacogdoches, Texas | Active | |
| **Lambda Xi** | 1991 | University of Central Arkansas | Conway, Arkansas | Active | |
| **Lambda Omicron** | 1990 | Cornell University | Ithaca, New York | Active | |
| **Lambda Pi** | 1990 | The College of New Jersey | Ewing Township, New Jersey | Active | |
| **Lambda Rho** | 1990 | University of Florida | Gainesville, Florida | Active | |
| **Lambda Tau** | 1990 | Stony Brook University | Stony Brook, New York | Active | |
| **Lambda Upsilon** | May 2, 1990 | University of Oklahoma | Norman, Oklahoma | Active | |
| **Lambda Phi** | 1990 | University of Maryland, Baltimore County | Baltimore County, Maryland | Active | |
| **Lambda Chi** | 1990 | Middle Tennessee State University | Murfreesboro, Tennessee | Active | |
| **Lambda Psi** | 1991 | University of North Carolina at Chapel Hill | Chapel Hill, North Carolina | Active | |
| **Lambda Omega** | 1990 | University at Albany, SUNY | Albany, New York | Active | |
| **Mu Alpha** | March 10, 1991 | University of California, Los Angeles | Los Angeles, California | Active | |
| **Mu Beta** | 1991 | University of Tennessee | Knoxville, Tennessee | Active | |
| **Mu Gamma** | 1991 | College of Charleston | Charleston, South Carolina | Active | |
| **Mu Delta** | 1991 | West Chester University | West Chester, Pennsylvania | Active | |
| **Mu Epsilon** | 1991 | Lamar University | Beaumont, Texas | Active | |
| **Mu Zeta** | 1991 | East Texas A&M University | Commerce, Texas | Active | |
| **Mu Eta** | 1991 | Southern Arkansas University | Magnolia, Arkansas | Active | |
| **Mu Theta** | 1991 | Central Michigan University | Mount Pleasant, Michigan | Active | |
| **Mu Iota** | 1991 | American International College | Springfield, Massachusetts | Active | |
| Mu Kappa First | November 2, 1991 – xxxx ? | Brown University | Providence, Rhode Island | Moved | (Note: Chapter moved to Johnson & Wales University) |
| **Mu Kappa** | 199x ? | Johnson & Wales University | Providence, Rhode Island | Active | |
| Mu Lambda | 199x ?–xxxx ? | | | Inactive | |
| **Mu Mu** | 1992 | National Louis University | Chicago, Illinois | Active | |
| **Mu Nu** | 1987 | University of Miami | Chicago, Illinois | Active | |
| **Mu Xi** | 1992 | Jacksonville State University | Jacksonville, Alabama | Active | |
| **Mu Omicron** | 1992 | University of Kentucky | Lexington, Kentucky | Active | |
| **Mu Pi** | 1992–xxxx ?; 2021 | Capital University | Columbus, Ohio | Active | |
| **Mu Rho** | 1992 | Georgia Southwestern State University | Americus, Georgia | Active | |
| **Mu Sigma** | December 8, 1945 | Baton Rouge Areawide | Baton Rouge, Louisiana | Active | |
| **Mu Tau** | March 5, 1992 | Livingstone College | Salisbury, North Carolina | Active | |
| **Mu Upsilon** | 1992 | University of Texas at Austin | Austin, Texas | Active | |
| **Mu Phi** | 1992–199x ?, 20xx ? | Texas State University | San Marcos, Texas | Active | |
| **Mu Chi** | 1992 | Wagner College | Staten Island, New York | Active | |
| **Mu Psi** | 1992 | Clemson University | Clemson, South Carolina | Active | |
| **Mu Omega** | April 12, 1992 | George Mason University | Fairfax, Virginia | Active | |
| **Nu Alpha** | 1992 | Cleveland Metro Area | Cleveland, Ohio | Active | |
| **Nu Beta** | October 3, 1992 | Kansas State University | Manhattan, Kansas | Active | |
| **Nu Gamma** | April 10, 1978 | University of Cincinnati | Cincinnati, Ohio | Active | |
| **Nu Delta** | 1992 | University of Maryland Eastern Shore | Princess Anne, Maryland | Active | |
| **Nu Epsilon** | 1992 | Missouri State University | Springfield, Missouri | Active | |
| **Nu Zeta** | 1992 | Austin Peay State University | Clarksville, Tennessee | Active | |
| **Nu Eta** | 1993 | University of Nevada, Las Vegas | Paradise, Nevada | Active | |
| **Nu Theta** | 1993 | Georgia Southern University | Statesboro, Georgia | Active | |
| **Nu Iota** | 1993 | University of Texas at Arlington | Arlington, Texas | Active | |
| Nu Kappa | 1993–xxxx ? | | | Inactive | |
| **Nu Lambda** | 1993 | University of Arkansas | Fayetteville, Arkansas | Active | |
| **Nu Mu** | May 8, 1993 | University of Connecticut | Storrs, Connecticut | Active | |
| **Nu Nu** | September 25, 1993 – xxxx ?; March 7, 2021 | Bennett College | Greensboro, North Carolina | Active | |
| Nu Xi | 1993–xxxx ? | | | Inactive | |
| **Nu Omicron** | 1993 | Elon University | Elon, North Carolina | Active | |
| **Nu Pi** | November 5, 1993 | Strayer University | Arlington, Virginia | Active | |
| **Nu Rho** | 1993 | University of North Carolina at Charlotte | Charlotte, North Carolina | Active | |
| **Nu Tau** | 1993 | Hofstra University | Nassau County, New York | Active | |
| **Nu Upsilon** | 1994 | University of Arizona | Tucson, Arizona | Active | |
| Nu Phi | 1994–xxxx ? | | | Inactive | |
| **Nu Chi** | 1994 | Lander University | Greenwood, South Carolina | Active | |
| **Nu Psi** (see Psi) | 1968 | Southern Illinois University Carbondale | Carbondale, Illinois | Active | (Note: This was the re-establishment of Psi chapter.) |
| **Nu Omega** | 1994 | California State University, Chico | Chico, California | Active | |
| Xi Alpha | 1994–xxxx ? | | | Inactive | |
| **Xi Beta** | 1994 | University of Toledo | Toledo, Ohio | Active | |
| **Xi Gamma** | 1994 | Morehead State University | Morehead, Kentucky | Active | |
| **Xi Delta** | 1994 | Stanford University | Stanford, California | Active | |
| **Xi Epsilon** | May 21, 1994 | California State University, Sacramento | Sacramento, California | Active | |
| **Xi Zeta** | 1994 | University of Mississippi | Oxford, Mississippi | Active | |
| **Xi Eta** | 1995–1999; 2020 | University of New Mexico | Albuquerque, New Mexico | Active | |
| **Xi Theta** | 1995 | Lincoln University | Oxford, Pennsylvania | Active | |
| **Xi Iota** | 1995 | Northern Arizona University | Flagstaff, Arizona | Active | |
| **Xi Kappa** | 1995 | Sonoma State University | Rohnert Park, California | Active | |
| **Xi Lambda** | 1995 | DePaul University | Chicago, Illinois | Active | |
| **Xi Mu** | 1995 | University of Alabama at Birmingham | Birmingham, Alabama | Active | |
| **Xi Nu** | 1996 | Grand Valley State University | Allendale, Michigan | Active | |
| **Xi Xi** | 1996 | Wright State University | Dayton, Ohio | Active | |
| **Xi Omicron** | 1996 | Rust College | Holly Springs, Mississippi | Active | |
| **Xi Pi** | 1996 | University of the Virgin Islands | United States Virgin Islands | Active | |
| **Xi Rho** | 1996 | University of California, Riverside | Riverside, California | Active | |
| Xi Tau | 1996–xxxx ? | | | Inactive | |
| **Xi Upsilon** | 1996 | Detroit Metropolitan | Detroit, Michigan | Active | |
| **Xi Phi** | 1996 | Utica University | Utica, New York | Active | |
| **Xi Chi** | 1996 | Baylor University | Waco, Texas | Active | |
| **Xi Psi** | 1996 | Mercer University | Macon, GA | Active | |
| **Xi Omega** | 1996 | Union College | Schenectady, New York | Active | |
| **Omicron Alpha** | 1996 | University of Wisconsin–Parkside | Kenosha, Wisconsin | Active | |
| **Omicron Beta** | 1996 | University of Illinois Chicago | Chicago, Illinois | Active | |
| **Omicron Gamma** | 1997 | Georgia State University | Atlanta, Georgia | Active | |
| **Omicron Delta** | 1997 | Southeastern Oklahoma State University | Durant, Oklahoma | Active | |
| **Omicron Epsilon** | 1997 | George Washington University | Washington, D.C. | Active | |
| **Omicron Zeta** | 1997 | University of Washington | Seattle, Washington | Active | |
| **Omicron Eta** | 1997–xxxx ?; March 4, 2022 | University of North Carolina at Greensboro | Greensboro, North Carolina | Active | |
| **Omicron Theta** | 1997 | Florida International University | Miami, Florida | Active | |
| **Omicron Iota** | 1997 | Auburn University | Auburn, Alabama | Active | |
| **Omicron Kappa** | 1998 | University of Tulsa | Tulsa, Oklahoma | Active | |
| **Omicron Lambda** | 1998 | Rollins College | Winter Park, Florida | Active | |
| **Omicron Mu** | 1998 | California State University, Fullerton | Fullerton, California | Active | |
| **Omicron Nu** | 1998 | Duke University | Durham, North Carolina | Active | |
| **Omicron Xi** | October 3, 1998 | Rhodes College | Memphis, Tennessee | Active | |
| **Omicron Omicron** | March 20, 1999 | Longwood University | Farmville, Virginia | Active | |
| **Omicron Pi** | May 22, 1999 | Troy University | Troy, Alabama | Active | |
| **Omicron Rho** | May 1, 1999 | California State University, Dominguez Hills | Carson, California | Active | |
| **Omicron Tau** | 1999 | Arkansas State University | Jonesboro, Arkansas | Active | |
| **Omicron Upsilon** | 1999 | Elon University | Elon, North Carolina | Active | |
| **Omicron Phi** | 1999 | American University | Washington, D.C. | Active | |
| **Omicron Chi** | 1999 | Chicago State University | Chicago, Illinois | Active | |
| Omicron Psi | xxxx ?–xxxx ? | | | Inactive | |
| **Omicron Omega** | 2000 | University of Arkansas at Little Rock | Little Rock, Arkansas | Active | |
| Pi Alpha | 2000–20xx ? | College of New Rochelle | New Rochelle, New York | Inactive | |
| **Pi Beta** | 2000 | Georgia College & State University | Milledgeville, Georgia | Active | |
| **Pi Gamma** | 2000 | Marist College | Poughkeepsie, New York | Active | |
| **Pi Delta** | 2001 | Washington State University | Pullman, Washington | Active | |
| **Pi Epsilon** | 2001 | University of Louisiana at Lafayette | Lafayette, Louisiana | Active | |
| **Pi Zeta** | 2001 | University of South Carolina Upstate | Valley Falls, South Carolina | Active | |
| **Pi Eta** | 2002 | Florida Atlantic University | Boca Raton, Florida | Active | |
| **Pi Theta** | 2002 | University of South Carolina Aiken | Aiken, South Carolina | Active | |
| **Pi Iota** | 2002 | Southeastern Louisiana University | Hammond, Louisiana | Active | |
| **Pi Kappa** | September 14, 2003 | Elmhurst University | Elmhurst, Illinois | Active | |
| **Pi Lambda** | 2003 | Auburn University at Montgomery | Montgomery, Alabama | Active | |
| **Pi Mu** | 200x ? | University of Missouri–St. Louis | St. Louis, Missouri | Active | |
| **Pi Nu** | March 27, 2004 | Oakland University | Rochester, Michigan | Active | |
| **Pi Xi** | May 29, 2004 | University of Massachusetts Amherst | Amherst, Massachusetts | Active | |
| **Pi Omicron** | 2004 | Emory University | St. Louis, Missouri | Active | |
| **Pi Pi** | 2004 | Christian Brothers University | Memphis, Tennessee | Active | |
| **Pi Rho** | 2004 | California State Polytechnic University, Pomona | Pomona, California | Active | |
| **Pi Tau** | 2005 | Gettysburg College | Gettysburg, Pennsylvania | Active | |
| **Pi Upsilon** | April 2, 2005 | Xavier University | Cincinnati, Ohio | Active | |
| **Pi Phi** | 2005 | San Francisco State University | San Francisco, California | Active | |
| ’Pi Chi’ | April 29, 2005 | Ursinus College | Collegeville, Pennsylvania | Active | |
| **Pi Psi** | 2005 | Frostburg State University | Frostburg, Maryland. | Active | |
| **Pi Omega** | 2005 | University of South Alabama | Mobile, Alabama | Active | |
| **Rho Alpha** | February 7, 2006 | University of Bridgeport | Bridgeport, Connecticut | Active | |
| **Rho Beta** | 2006 | University of Northern Iowa | Cedar Falls, Iowa | Active | |
| **Rho Gamma** | 2006 | Charleston Southern University | North Charleston, South Carolina | Active | |
| **Rho Delta** | 2006 | University of New Orleans | New Orleans, Louisiana | Active | |
| **Rho Epsilon** | 2006 | Ursuline College | Pepper Pike, Ohio | Active | |
| Rho Zeta | 2006–20xx ? | | | Inactive | |
| **Rho Eta** | December 8, 2006 | Loyola Marymount University | Los Angeles, California | Active | |
| **Rho Theta** | 2007 | Susquehanna University | Selinsgrove, Pennsylvania | Active | |
| Rho Iota | 200x ?–20xx ? | | | Inactive | |
| **Rho Kappa** | February 28, 2007 | University of North Carolina Wilmington | Wilmington, North Carolina | Active | |
| **Rho Lambda** | 2007 | Clayton State University | Morrow, Georgia | Active | |
| **Rho Mu** | March 20, 2008 | California State University, San Bernardino | San Bernardino, California | Active | |
| **Rho Nu** | April 27, 2008 | University of North Carolina at Pembroke | Pembroke, North Carolina | Active | |
| **Rho Xi** | 2008 | St. John's University | Staten Island, New York | Active | |
| **Rho Omicron** | 2008 | Bloomsburg University of Pennsylvania | Bloomsburg, Pennsylvania | Active | |
| **Rho Pi** | 2007 | Shippensburg University of Pennsylvania | Shippensburg, Pennsylvania | Active | |
| **Rho Rho** | 2008 | McNeese State University | Lake Charles, Louisiana | Active | |
| **Rho Tau** | 2009 | Aurora University | Aurora, Illinois | Active | |
| **Rho Upsilon** | 2009 | Columbus State University | Columbus, Georgia | Active | |
| **Rho Phi** | 2009 | University of North Florida | Jacksonville, Florida | Active | |
| **Rho Chi** | 2009 | Northern Kentucky University | Highland Heights, Kentucky | Active | |
| **Rho Psi** | 2009 | Eastern Kentucky University | Richmond, Kentucky | Active | |
| **Rho Omega** | 2009 | Johns Hopkins University | Baltimore, Maryland | Active | |
| **Sigma Alpha** | 2009 | Kennesaw State University | Cobb County, Georgia | Active | |
| **Sigma Beta** | April 18, 2009 | Quinnipiac University | Hamden, Connecticut | Active | |
| **Sigma Gamma** | April 18, 2009 | Southern Connecticut State University | New Haven, Connecticut | Active | |
| **Sigma Delta** | 2009 | Vanderbilt University | Nashville, Tennessee | Active | |
| **Sigma Epsilon** | 2009 | Nicholls State University | Thibodaux, Louisiana | Active | |
| **Sigma Zeta** | 2010 | University of Tampa | Tampa, Florida | Active | |
| **Sigma Eta** | 2011 | Northeastern Illinois University | Chicago, Illinois | Active | |
| **Sigma Theta** | 2011 | William Paterson University | Wayne, New Jersey | Active | |
| **Sigma Iota** | 2011 | Pace University | New York City, New York | Active | |
| **Sigma Kappa** | 2011 | Suffolk University | Boston, Massachusetts | Active | (Note: Originally part of the Boston Metro Kappa Nu chapter.) |
| **Sigma Lambda** | 2011 | College of William & Mary | Williamsburg, Virginia | Active | |
| **Sigma Mu** | 2005 | The University of Chicago | Chicago, Illinois | Active | |
| **Sigma Nu** | 2012 | York College of Pennsylvania | Spring Garden Township, Pennsylvania | Active | |
| **Sigma Xi** | 2012 | University of Massachusetts Boston | Boston, Massachusetts | Active | |
| **Sigma Omicron** | 2012 | California State University, East Bay | Hayward, California | Active | |
| **Sigma Pi** | 2013 | University of Michigan–Flint | Flint, Michigan | Active | |
| Sigma Rho | 2013–20xx ? | | | Inactive | |
| **Sigma Tau** | 2013 | Saint Leo University | St. Leo, Florida | Active | |
| **Sigma Upsilon** | 2013 | Georgia Tech | Athens, Georgia | Active | |
| **Sigma Phi** | 2013 | Farleigh Dickinson University | Madison, New Jersey | Active | |
| **Sigma Chi** | 2013 | University of the Bahamas | Nassau, Bahamas | Active | |
| **Sigma Psi** | 2014 | Stetson University | Pensacola, Florida | Active | |
| Sigma Omega | April 26, 2014 – 20xx ? | Carleton University | Ottawa, Ontario, Canada | Inactive | |
| **Tau Alpha** | May 17, 2014 | California State University, Los Angeles | East Los Angeles, California | Active | |
| **Tau Beta** | April 11, 2015 | University of West Florida | Pensacola, Florida | Active | |
| **Tau Gamma** | 2015 | Kean University | Union, New Jersey | Active | |
| **Tau Delta** | 2015 | Radford University | Radford, Virginia | Active | |
| **Tau Epsilon** | 2015 | New York University | New York City, New York | Active | |
| **Tau Zeta** | 2016 | Lehigh University | Bethlehem, Pennsylvania | Active | |
| Tau Eta | 201x ?–20xx ? | | | Inactive | |
| **Tau Theta** | 2015 | University at Buffalo | Buffalo, New York | Active | |
| **Tau Iota** | 2016 | Denison University | Granville, Ohio | Active | |
| **Tau Kappa** | 2016 | University of West Alabama | Livingston, Alabama | Active | |
| **Tau Lambda** | May 6, 2016 | California State University San Marcos | San Marcos, California | Active | |
| **Tau Mu** | 2017 | University of Texas at San Antonio | San Antonio, Texas | Active | |
| **Tau Nu** | 2017 | University of La Verne | La Verne, California | Active | |
| **Tau Xi** | 2017 | Georgia Southern University | Statesboro, Georgia | Active | |
| **Tau Omicron** | January 20, 2018 | Wilmington College | Wilmington, Ohio | Active | |
| **Tau Pi** | 2018 | University of Texas at Dallas | Richardson, Texas | Active | |
| **Tau Rho** | 2018 | Texas Christian University | Fort Worth, Texas | Active | |
| **Tau Tau** | 2018 | Brooklyn College | Brooklyn, New York | Active | |
| **Tau Phi** | 2019 | Augusta University | Augusta, Georgia | Active | |
| **Tau Chi** | April 27, 2019 | Wingate University | Wingate, North Carolina | Active | |
| **Tau Psi** | March 30, 2019 | Coastal Carolina University | Conway, South Carolina | Active | |
| **Tau Omega** | March 31, 2019 | Mississippi University for Women | Columbus, Mississippi | Active | |
| Upsilon Alpha | April 13, 2019 – 20xx ? | State University of New York at Cortland | Cortland, New York | Inactive | |
| **Upsilon Beta** | April 25, 2020 | University of Dayton | Dayton, Ohio | Active | |
| Upsilon Gamma | 202x ?–20xx ? | | | Inactive | |
| **Upsilon Delta** | March 27, 2021 | University of Montevallo | Montevallo, Alabama | Active | |
| **Upsilon Epsilon** | April 3, 2021 | University of North Alabama | Florence, Alabama | Active | |
| **Upsilon Zeta** | 2021 | Western Carolina University | Cullowhee, North Carolina | Active | |
| **Upsilon Eta** | November 20, 2021 | University of Texas at El Paso | El Paso, Texas | Active | |
| Upsilon Theta | | | | Inactive ? | |
| **Upsilon Iota** | 2021 | Delta State University | Cleveland, Mississippi | Active | |
| Upsilon Kappa | | | | Inactive ? | |
| Upsilon Lambda | | | | Inactive ? | |
| **Upsilon Mu** | 2023 | University of North Texas at Dallas | Dallas, Texas | Active | |
| **Upsilon Nu** | 2023 | Johnson & Wales University, Charlotte Campus | Charlotte, North Carolina | Active | |
| **Upsilon Xi** | 2023 | University of Hartford | West Hartford, Connecticut | Active | |
| **Omega Rho** | | | | Memorial | |
| **Bethel College Regional UG** | | Bethel University | South Bend, Indiana | Colony | |
| **Columbia College Regional UG** | | Columbia College Chicago | Chicago, Illinois | Colony | |
| **Indiana University South Bend Regional UG** | | Indiana University South Bend | South Bend, Indiana | Colony | |
| **Rockhurst University Regional UG** | | Rockhurst University | Kansas City, Missouri | Colony | |
| **Wheaton College Regional UG** | | Wheaton College | Wheaton, Illinois | Colony | |
| **University of Indianapolis Regional UG** | | University of Indianapolis | Indianapolis, Indiana | Colony | |
| **University of Phoenix Regional UG** | | University of Phoenix | St. Louis, Missouri | Colony | |

== Alumnae chapters ==
Following is a list of Sigma Gamma Rho alumnae chapters. Active chapters are indicated in bold. Inactive chapters are indicated in italics.

| Chapter | Charter date and range | Location | Status | Ref. |
|---|---|---|---|---|
| **Alpha Sigma** | 1922 | Indianapolis, Indiana | Active | |
| **Beta Sigma** | 192x ? | Montgomery, Alabama | Active | |
| **Gamma Sigma** | 1928 | Houston, Texas | Active | |
| **Delta Sigma** | 1927 | Chicago, Illinois | Active | |
| **Epsilon Sigma** | 19xx ? | New Orleans, Louisiana | Active | |
| **Zeta Sigma** | June 5, 1932 | St. Louis, Missouri | Active | |
| **Eta Sigma** | 1923 | Atlanta, Georgia | Active | |
| **Theta Sigma** | March 8, 1935 | Little Rock, Arkansas | Active | |
| **Iota Sigma** | 1935 | Richmond, Virginia | Active | |
| **Kappa Sigma** | 1936 | New York City, New York | Active | |
| Lambda Sigma | | | InActive | |
| **Mu Sigma** | December 8, 1945 | Baton Rouge, Louisiana | Active | |
| **Nu Sigma** | November 2, 1937 | Jackson, Tennessee | Active | |
| **Xi Sigma** | 1937 | Spartanburg, South Carolina | Active | |
| **Omicron Sigma** | 1937 | Memphis, Tennessee | Active | |
| **Pi Sigma** | 1938 | Louisville, Kentucky | Active | |
| **Rho Sigma** | 1936 | Detroit, Michigan | Active | |
| **Sigma Sigma** | July 30, 1939 | Los Angeles, California | Active | |
| **Tau Sigma** | February 19, 1938 | Jackson, Mississippi | Active | |
| **Upsilon Sigma** | November 12, 1939 | Nashville, Tennessee | Active | |
| **Phi Sigma** | August 14, 1938 | Washington, D.C. | Active | |
| **Chi Sigma** | November 11, 1938 | Birmingham, Alabama | Active | |
| **Psi Sigma** | December 19, 1938 | Kansas City, Missouri | Active | |
| **Omega Sigma** | 19xx ? | Newport News, Virginia | Active | |
| **Alpha Alpha Sigma** | April 9, 1940 | Baltimore, Maryland | Active | |
| **Alpha Beta Sigma** | 194x ? | Portsmouth, Virginia | Active | |
| **Alpha Gamma Sigma** | March 1941 | Longview, Texas | Active | |
| Alpha Delta Sigma | | | Inactive | |
| Alpha Epsilon Sigma | | | Inactive | |
| **Alpha Zeta Sigma** | January 25, 1941 January 25, 1941 | Bessemer, Alabama | Active | |
| **Alpha Eta Sigma** | March 28, 1941 | Philadelphia, Pennsylvania | Active | |
| Alpha Theta Sigma | | | Inactive | |
| **Alpha Iota Sigma** | 194x ? | Savannah, Georgia | Active | |
| **Alpha Kappa Sigma** | February 2, 1946 | Austin, Texas | Active | |
| **Alpha Lambda Sigma** | June 20, 1942 | Cleveland, Ohio | Active | |
| **Alpha Mu Sigma** | February 15, 1943 | Winston-Salem, North Carolina | Active | |
| **Alpha Nu Sigma** | 1943 | Wilmington, Delaware | Active | |
| **Alpha Xi Sigma** | 194x ? | Tulsa, Oklahoma | Active | |
| **Alpha Omicron Sigma** | December 29, 1944 | Dallas, Texas | Active | |
| **Alpha Pi Sigma** | March 17, 1945 | Fort Worth, Texas | Active | |
| **Alpha Rho Sigma** | 194x ? | Waco, Texas | Active | |
| **Alpha Sigma Sigma** | 194x ? | Gary, Indiana | Active | |
| Alpha Tau Sigma | | | Inactive | |
| **Alpha Upsilon Sigma** | 1941 | East St. Louis, Illinois | Active | (Note: Chapter formed from the Upsilon collegiate chapter.) |
| **Alpha Phi Sigma** | October 6, 1945 | San Antonio, Texas | Active | |
| **Alpha Chi Sigma** | 1945 | Pine Bluff, Arkansas | Active | |
| **Alpha Psi Sigma** | 194x ? | Beaumont, Texas | Active | |
| **Alpha Omega Sigma** | December 29, 1944 | Dallas, Texas | Active | |
| Beta Alpha Sigma | | | Inactive | |
| Beta Beta Sigma | | | Inactive | |
| Beta Gamma Sigma | | | Inactive | |
| **Beta Delta Sigma** | 1946 | Tallahassee, Florida | Active | |
| **Beta Epsilon Sigma** | 194x ? | Columbia, South Carolina | Active | |
| **Beta Zeta Sigma** | 1947 | Rocky Mount, North Carolina | Active | |
| **Beta Eta Sigma** | August 1947 | Portland, Oregon | Active | |
| **Beta Theta Sigma** | November 30, 1947 | Oakland, California | Active | |
| **Beta Iota Sigma** | 194x ? | Daytona Beach, Florida | Active | |
| **Beta Kappa Sigma** | 194x ? | Tampa, Florida | Active | |
| **Beta Lambda Sigma** | December 10, 1949 | Raleigh, North Carolina | Active | |
| **Beta Mu Sigma** | May 20, 1952 | Phoenix, Arizona | Active | |
| **Beta Nu Sigma** | June 24, 1950 | San Diego, California | Active | |
| **Beta Xi Sigma** | 1950 | Petersburg, Virginia | Active | |
| **Beta Omicron Sigma** | December 2, 1950 | Charlotte, North Carolina | Active | |
| **Beta Pi Sigma** | April 13, 1951 | Durham, North Carolina | Active | |
| **Beta Rho Sigma** | 1951 | Denver, Colorado | Active | |
| **Beta Sigma Sigma** | 195x ? | Wilmington, North Carolina | Active | |
| Beta Tau Sigma | | | Inactive | |
| Beta Upsilon Sigma | | | Inactive | |
| Beta Phi Sigma | 195x ?–202x ? | Jefferson City, Missouri | Inactive | |
| **Beta Chi Sigma** | 1953 | Hattiesburg, Mississippi | Active | |
| **Beta Psi Sigma** | 195x ?–xxxx ?; March 14, 2007 | Long Island, New York | Active | |
| **Beta Omega Sigma** | 19xx ? | Shreveport, Louisiana | Active | |
| **Gamma Alpha Sigma** | March 14, 1954 | Bakersfield, California | Active | |
| **Gamma Beta Sigma** | 1954 | Omaha, Nebraska | Active | |
| **Gamma Gamma Sigma** | May 11, 1955 | West Palm Beach, Florida | Active | |
| **Gamma Delta Sigma** | March 11, 1955 | Miami, Florida | Active | |
| Gamma Epsilon Sigma | | | Inactive | |
| Gamma Zeta Sigma | | | Inactive | |
| **Gamma Eta Sigma** | 19xx ? | Knoxville, Tennessee | Active | |
| **Gamma Theta Sigma** | 19xx ? | Chattanooga, Tennessee | Active | |
| **Gamma Iota Sigma** | April 1961 | Fort Pierce, Florida | Active | |
| Gamma Kappa Sigma | | | Inactive | |
| **Gamma Lambda Sigma** | 19xx ? | Lake Charles, Louisiana | Active | |
| **Gamma Mu Sigma** | 19xx ? | Oklahoma City, Oklahoma | Active | |
| **Gamma Nu Sigma** | 1962 | Newark, New Jersey | Active | |
| Gamma Xi Sigma | | | Inactive | |
| **Gamma Omicron Sigma** | September 29, 1962 | Jacksonville, Florida | Active | |
| **Gamma Pi Sigma** | March 15, 1963 | Milwaukee, Wisconsin | Active | |
| Gamma Rho Sigma | | | Inactive | |
| **Gamma Sigma Sigma** | 196x ? | Bermuda | Active | |
| **Gamma Tau Sigma** | December 26, 1964 | Long Beach, California | Active | |
| **Gamma Upsilon Sigma** | 196c ? | Monroe, North Carolina | Active | |
| **Gamma Phi Sigma** | 1966 | Houston, Texas | Active | |
| **Gamma Chi Sigma** | June 17, 1967 | Wichita, Kansas | Active | |
| **Gamma Psi Sigma** | May 21, 1967 | Saginaw, Michigan | Active | |
| **Gamma Omega Sigma** | 196x ? | Suffolk, Virginia | Active | |
| **Delta Alpha Sigma** | March 23, 1968 | Augusta, Georgia | Active | |
| **Delta Beta Sigma** | May 18, 1968 | Norfolk, Virginia | Active | |
| **Delta Gamma Sigma** | June 8, 1968 | Fayetteville, North Carolina | Active | |
| Delta Delta Sigma | | | Inactive | |
| Delta Epsilon Sigma | | | Inactive | |
| **Delta Zeta Sigma** | 19xx ? | Compton, California | Active | |
| **Delta Eta Sigma** | September 19, 1973 | Kansas City, Kansas | Active | |
| Delta Theta Sigma | | | Inactive | |
| **Delta Iota Sigma** | November 3, 1973 | Charleston, South Carolina | Active | |
| **Delta Kappa Sigma** | January 26, 1974 | Plainfield, New Jersey | Active | |
| **Delta Lambda Sigma** | 197x ? | Vicksburg, Mississippi | Active | |
| **Delta Mu Sigma** | January 1974 | Orlando, Florida | Active | |
| **Delta Nu Sigma** | May 1975 | Mount Vernon, New York | Active | |
| **Delta Xi Sigma** | 197x ? | Evanston, Illinois | Active | |
| **Delta Omicron Sigma** | July 20, 1975 | Columbus, Ohio | Active | |
| **Delta Pi Sigma** | April 14, 1975 | Macon, Georgia | Active | |
| **Delta Rho Sigma** | November 8, 1975 – xxxx ?; September 2010 | Tuskegee, Alabama | Active | |
| **Delta Sigma Sigma** | April 24, 1976 | Greensboro, North Carolina | Active | |
| **Delta Tau Sigma** | March 30, 1974 | Dover, Delaware | Active | |
| **Delta Upsilon Sigma** | April 4, 1976 | Fort Lauderdale, Florida | Active | |
| **Delta Phi Sigma** | April 10, 1976 | Pittsburgh, Pennsylvania | Active | |
| **Delta Chi Sigma** | 197x ? – xxxx ?; 2009 | Orangeburg, South Carolina | Active | |
| **Delta Psi Sigma** | May 27, 1977 | Seattle, Washington | Active | |
| **Delta Omega Sigma** | 197x ? | Urbana, Illinois | Active | |
| **Epsilon Alpha Sigma** | June 9, 1979 | Opelousas, Louisiana | Active | |
| **Epsilon Beta Sigma** | 19xx ? | St. Petersburg, Florida | Active | |
| Epsilon Gamma Sigma | | | Inactive | |
| Epsilon Delta Sigma | | | Inactive | |
| Epsilon Epsilon Sigma | | | Inactive | |
| **Epsilon Zeta Sigma** | May 26, 1979 | Burlington, New Jersey | Active | |
| **Epsilon Eta Sigma** | May 3, 1980 | Peoria, Illinois | Active | |
| **Epsilon Theta Sigma** | 198x ? | Des Moines, Iowa | Active | |
| Epsilon Iota Sigma | | | Inactive | |
| **Epsilon Kappa Sigma** | July 31, 1980 | Dayton, Ohio | Active | |
| **Epsilon Lambda Sigma** | November 1, 1980 N | Cincinnati, Ohio | Active | |
| **Epsilon Mu Sigma** | 1980 | Tuscaloosa, Alabama | Active | |
| **Epsilon Nu Sigma** | 198x ? | Matteson, Illinois | Active | |
| Epsilon Xi Sigma | 198x ?–xxxx ? | Ocala, Florida | Inactive | |
| Epsilon Omicron Sigma | | | Inactive | |
| Epsilon Pi Sigma | | | Inactive | |
| **Epsilon Rho Sigma** | April 17, 1981 | Pensacola, Florida | Active | |
| Epsilon Sigma Sigma | 1981–xxxx ? | Springfield, Illinois | Inactive | |
| **Epsilon Tau Sigma** | 1981 | Stafford, Texas | Active | |
| Epsilon Upsilon Sigma | | | Inactive | |
| **Epsilon Phi Sigma** | November 7, 1981 | Gretna, Louisiana | Active | |
| **Epsilon Chi Sigma** | 198x ? | Lancaster, California | Active | |
| **Epsilon Psi Sigma** | March 6, 1982 | Topeka, Kansas | Active | |
| **Epsilon Omega Sigma** | December 19, 1983 | Oklahoma City, Oklahoma | Active | |
| **Zeta Alpha Sigma** | 1985 | College Park, Georgia | Active | |
| **Zeta Beta Sigma** | 198x ? | D'Iberville, Mississippi | Active | |
| **Zeta Gamma Sigma** | July 9, 1982 | East Chicago, Indiana | Active | |
| **Zeta Delta Sigma** | 1982 | Arlington, Texas | Active | |
| **Zeta Epsilon Sigma** | 198x ? | Greenwood, Mississippi | Active | |
| **Zeta Zeta Sigma** | January 30, 1988 | Ann Arbor, Michigan | Active | |
| **Zeta Eta Sigma** | May 25, 1985 | Pontiac, Michigan | Active | |
| Zeta Theta Sigma | | | Inactive | |
| **Zeta Iota Sigma** | 198x ?–xxxx ?, August 2017 | Saint Paul, Minnesota | Active | |
| **Zeta Kappa Sigma** | 198x ? | Lansing, Michigan | Active | |
| **Zeta Lambda Sigma** | 198x ? | Starkville, Mississippi | Active | |
| **Zeta Mu Sigma** | November 5, 1983 – xxxx ?; December 1, 2008 | Charlottesville, Virginia | Active | |
| **Zeta Nu Sigma** | April 12, 1986 | Boston, Massachusetts | Active | |
| **Zeta Xi Sigma** | 198x ? | Harvey, Illinois | Active | |
| **Zeta Omicron Sigma** | 198x ? | Bolingbrook, Illinois | Active | |
| **Zeta Pi Sigma** | 1984 | Greenville, North Carolina | Active | |
| **Zeta Rho Sigma** | 198x ? | Freeport, Bahamas | Active | |
| Zeta Sigma Sigma | | | Inactive | |
| **Zeta Tau Sigma** | 1983 | Largo, Maryland | Active | |
| Zeta Upsilon Sigma | 198x ?– xxxx ? | Kingsmill, Virginia | Inactive | |
| **Zeta Phi Sigma** | June 13, 1987 – xxxx ?; July 1, 2017 | Tacoma, Washington | Active | |
| **Zeta Chi Sigma** | 198x ? | Norman, Oklahoma | Active | |
| **Zeta Psi Sigma** | 19xx ? | Albany, Georgia | Active | |
| **Zeta Omega Sigma** | March 6, 1988 | Randallstown, Maryland | Active | |
| **Eta Alpha Sigma** | September 28, 1988 | Sacramento, California | Active | |
| **Eta Beta Sigma** | 1989–xxxx ?; November 18, 2017 | Albuquerque, New Mexico | Active | |
| **Eta Gamma Sigma** | 1989 | Denmark, South Carolina | Active | |
| **Eta Delta Sigma** | September 19, 1989 | Akron, Ohio | Active | |
| **Eta Epsilon Sigma** | 1990 | Lexington, Kentucky | Active | |
| **Eta Zeta Sigma** | 199x ? | Ellicott City, Maryland | Active | |
| Eta Eta Sigma | October 17, 1992 – 201x ? | Boynton Beach, Florida | Inactive | |
| **Eta Theta Sigma** | October 20, 1990 – xxxx ?; October 22, 2016 | Silver Spring, Maryland | Active | |
| **Eta Iota Sigma** | November 3, 1990 | Chevy Chase, Maryland | Active | |
| **Eta Kappa Sigma** | 199x ? | Miami, Florida | Active | |
| **Eta Lambda Sigma** | June 7, 1991 | Monroe, Louisiana | Active | |
| **Eta Mu Sigma** | 1991 | St. Louis, Missouri | Active | |
| **Eta Nu Sigma** | December 21, 1991 | Brooklyn, New York | Active | |
| **Eta Xi Sigma** | August 16, 1992 | Oak Lawn, Illinois | Active | |
| Eta Omicron Sigma First | February 20, 1993 – xxxx ? | Washington, D.C. | Reissued | |
| **Eta Omicron Sigma** | December 22, 2005 | Waldorf, Maryland | Active | |
| Eta Pi Sigma First | March 27, 1993 – xxxx ? | Kalamazoo, Michigan | Reissued | |
| **Eta Pi Sigma** | April 16, 2011 | Grand Rapids, Michigan | Active | |
| **Eta Rho Sigma** | March 13, 1993 | Buffalo, New York | Active | |
| **Eta Sigma Sigma** | August 12, 1993 | Greenville, South Carolina | Active | |
| Eta Tau Sigma | | | Inactive | |
| **Eta Upsilon Sigma** | 1993 | Brunswick, Georgia | Active | |
| **Eta Phi Sigma** | 199x ? | Gainesville, Florida | Active | |
| **Eta Chi Sigma** | September 1994 | Las Vegas, Nevada | Active | |
| **Eta Psi Sigma** | October 28, 1994 | Shreveport, Louisiana | Active | |
| **Eta Omega Sigma** | 199x ? | Roanoke, Virginia | Active | |
| **Theta Alpha Sigma** | June 1995 | Hartford, Connecticut | Active | |
| Theta Beta Sigma | | | Inactive | |
| **Theta Gamma Sigma** | December 1, 1995 | Albany, New York | Active | |
| **Theta Delta Sigma** | February 17, 1996 – xxxx ?; December 15, 2016 | Flint, Michigan | Active | |
| **Theta Epsilon Sigma** | June 2, 1996 | Culver City, California | Active | |
| **Theta Zeta Sigma** | 1996 | Aurora, Colorado | Active | |
| **Theta Eta Sigma** | December 3, 1996 | Rock Hill, South Carolina | Active | |
| **Theta Theta Sigma** | November 12, 1998 | Huntsville, Alabama | Active | |
| **Theta Iota Sigma** | November 6, 1996 | Oxford, Mississippi | Active | |
| Theta Kappa Sigma | | | Inactive | |
| **Theta Lambda Sigma** | September 26, 1997 | Cary, North Carolina | Active | |
| **Theta Mu Sigma** | 199x ? | Kernersville, North Carolina | Active | |
| **Theta Nu Sigma** | October 4, 1997 | Florence, South Carolina | Active | |
| Theta Xi Sigma | | | Inactive | |
| **Theta Omicron Sigma** | January 31, 1998 | Syracuse, New York | Active | |
| **Theta Pi Sigma** | February 21, 1998 | Riverside County, California | Active | |
| **Theta Rho Sigma** | November 1, 1998 | Bronx, New York | Active | |
| **Theta Sigma Sigma** | November 12, 1998 | Poughkeepsie, New York | Active | |
| **Theta Tau Sigma** | 199x ? | Saint Thomas, U.S. Virgin Islands | Active | |
| **Theta Upsilon Sigma** | December 19, 1998 | Inglewood, California | Active | |
| **Theta Phi Sigma** | January 30, 1999 | Jersey City, New Jersey | Active | |
| **Theta Chi Sigma** | March 6, 1999 | Oak Park, Illinois | Active | |
| **Theta Psi Sigma** | October 3, 1999 | Chester, Pennsylvania | Active | |
| **Theta Omega Sigma** | October 23, 1999 – xxxx ?; January 22, 2011 | Rochester, New York | Active | |
| **Iota Alpha Sigma** | xxxx ? | Bergen County, New Jersey | Active | |
| **Iota Beta Sigma** | 2000 | Silicon Valley, California | Active | |
| **Iota Gamma Sigma** | June 10, 2000 | Athens, Georgia | Active | |
| **Iota Delta Sigma** | January 13, 2001 | Landstuhl, Germany | Active | |
| **Iota Epsilon Sigma** | March 31, 2001 | Woodbridge, Virginia | Active | |
| **Iota Zeta Sigma** | March 24, 2001 | Atlanta, Georgia | Active | |
| **Iota Eta Sigma** | December 1, 2001 | Troy, Alabama | Active | |
| **Iota Theta Sigma** | December 8, 2001 | Toledo, Ohio | Active | |
| Iota Iota Sigma | | | Inactive | |
| **Iota Kappa Sigma** | March 16, 2002 | Brevard County, Florida | Active | |
| **Iota Lambda Sigma** | June 29, 2002 | Germantown, Tennessee | Active | |
| **Iota Mu Sigma** | 200x ? | Kingstree, South Carolina | Active | |
| **Iota Nu Sigma** | October 25, 2002 | Worthington, Ohio | Active | |
| **Iota Xi Sigma** | November 23, 2002 | South Bend, Indiana | Active | |
| **Iota Omicron Sigma** | November 1, 2003 | West Columbia, South Carolina | Active | |
| **Iota Pi Sigma** | January 10, 2004 | Clarksville, Tennessee | Active | |
| **Iota Rho Sigma** | August 21, 2004 | Joliet, Illinois | Active | |
| **Iota Sigma Sigma** | October 8, 2004 | St. Bernard, Ohio | Active | |
| **Iota Tau Sigma** | October 23, 2004 | Lafayette, Louisiana | Active | |
| **Iota Upsilon Sigma** | November 5, 2004 | DeKalb, Illinois | Active | |
| **Iota Phi Sigma** | January 15, 2005 | Nacogdoches, Texas | Active | |
| **Iota Chi Sigma** | May 14, 2005 | New Haven, Connecticut | Active | |
| **Iota Psi Sigma** | August 27, 2005 | Brown Deer, Wisconsin | Active | |
| Iota Omega Sigma | | | Inactive | |
| **Kappa Alpha Sigma** | October 29, 2005 | Columbus, Georgia | Active | |
| Kappa Beta Sigma | | | Inactive | |
| **Kappa Gamma Sigma** | 2006 | Bratenahl, Ohio | Active | |
| **Kappa Delta Sigma** | September 2, 2006 | Nassau, Bahamas | Active | |
| **Kappa Epsilon Sigma** | September 16, 2006 | Normal, Illinois | Active | |
| **Kappa Zeta Sigma** | September 30, 2006 | Mobile, Alabama | Active | |
| Kappa Eta Sigma | December 1, 2006 – 202x ? | Scottsdale, Arizona | Inactive | |
| Kappa Theta Sigma | | | Inactive | |
| **Kappa Iota Sigma** | 200x ? | Selinsgrove, Pennsylvania | Active | |
| **Kappa Kappa Sigma** | April 14, 2007 | Southfield, Michigan | Active | |
| **Kappa Lambda Sigma** | September 15, 2007 | Anniston, Alabama | Active | |
| Kappa Mu Sigma | | | Inactive | |
| **Kappa Nu Sigma** | October 2007 | San Fernando Valley, California | Active | |
| **Kappa Xi Sigma** | October 27, 2007 | Conway, Arkansas | Active | |
| **Kappa Omicron Sigma** | May 8, 2008 | Harrisburg, Pennsylvania | Active | |
| **Kappa Pi Sigma** | 200x ? | Atlantic City, New Jersey | Active | |
| **Kappa Rho Sigma** | May 24, 2008 | Goose Creek, South Carolina | Active | |
| **Kappa Sigma Sigma** | 200x ? | Flagstaff, Arizona | Active | |
| **Kappa Tau Sigma** | June 12, 2008 | Murfreesboro, Tennessee | Active | |
| **Kappa Upsilon Sigma** | September 1, 2008 | Beaufort, South Carolina | Active | |
| Kappa Phi Sigma | | | Inactive | |
| **Kappa Chi Sigma** | October 25, 2008 | Norristown, Pennsylvania | Active | |
| **Kappa Psi Sigma** | October 28, 2008 | Valdosta, Georgia | Active | |
| **Kappa Omega Sigma** | November 11, 2008 – 20xx ?; September 15, 2018 | Gibsonton, Florida | Active | |
| **Lambda Alpha Sigma** | June 6, 2009 – 20xx ?; August 22, 2020 | Tucson, Arizona | Active | |
| **Lambda Beta Sigma** | November 21, 2009 | Springfield, Massachusetts | Active | |
| **Lambda Gamma Sigma** | May 15, 2010 | Pomona, California | Active | |
| **Lambda Delta Sigma** | May 16, 2010 | Annapolis, Maryland | Active | |
| **Lambda Epsilon Sigma** | June 5, 2010 | Salisbury, North Carolina | Active | |
| **Lambda Zeta Sigma** | June 19, 2010 | Litchfield, Connecticut | Active | |
| **Lambda Eta Sigma** | September 11, 2010 | Pinson, Alabama | Active | |
| **Lambda Theta Sigma** | October 2, 2010 | Brooksville, Florida | Active | |
| **Lambda Iota Sigma** | December 5, 2010 | Madison, Tennessee | Active | |
| **Lambda Kappa Sigma** | January 29, 2011 | Brockton, Massachusetts | Active | |
| **Lambda Lambda Sigma** | April 16, 2011 | Kalamazoo, Michigan | Active | |
| **Lambda Mu Sigma** | August 6, 2011 | Honolulu, Hawaii | Active | |
| **Lambda Nu Sigma** | October 8, 2011 | Toronto, Ontario, Canada | Active | |
| **Lambda Xi Sigma** | October 15, 2011 | Athens, Ohio | Active | |
| Lambda Omicron Sigma | | | Inactive | |
| **Lambda Pi Sigma** | 2012 | Savannah, Georgia | Active | |
| **Lambda Rho Sigma** | 2012 | Santa Monica, California | Active | |
| **Lambda Sigma Sigma** | June 9, 2012 | Stockbridge, Georgia | Active | |
| **Lambda Tau Sigma** | 201x ? | Miami, Florida | Active | |
| **Lambda Upsilon Sigma** | June 29, 2013 | Plano, Texas | Active | |
| **Lambda Phi Sigma** | August 2, 2013 | Fayetteville, Arkansas | Active | |
| **Lambda Chi Sigma** | September 7, 2013 | Alsip, Illinois | Active | |
| Lambda Psi Sigma | 201x ? | | Inactive | |
| **Lambda Omega Sigma** | November 9, 2013 | Spring, Texas | Active | |
| Mu Alpha Sigma | 201x ? | | Inactive | |
| **Mu Beta Sigma** | July 26, 2014 | Round Rock, Texas | Active | |
| **Mu Gamma Sigma -** | September 13, 2014 | Aberdeen, Maryland | Active | |
| **Mu Delta Sigma** | May 9, 2015 | Fort Myers, Florida | Active | |
| **Mu Epsilon Sigma** | January 23, 2016 | Roswell, Georgia | Active | |
| **Mu Zeta Sigma** | January 26, 2016 | Kankakee, Illinois | Active | |
| **Mu Eta Sigma** | July 9, 2016 | Alexandria, Louisiana | Active | |
| **Mu Theta Sigma** | 2016 | Roanoke Rapids, North Carolina | Active | |
| **Mu Iota Sigma** | October 2, 2016 | Olive Branch, Mississippi | Active | |
| **Mu Kappa Sigma** | September 30, 2016 | Waukegan, Illinois | Active | |
| **Mu Lambda Sigma** | October 22, 2016 | Trenton, New Jersey | Active | |
| **Mu Mu Sigma** | June 28, 2017 | Tallahassee, Florida | Active | |
| **Mu Nu Sigma** | November 10, 2017 | York, Pennsylvania | Active | |
| **Mu Xi Sigma** | November 11, 2017 | Elizabeth City, North Carolina | Active | |
| **Mu Omicron Sigma** | January 27, 2018 | Salisbury, Maryland | Active | |
| **Mu Pi Sigma** | May 19, 2018 | Bethlehem, Pennsylvania | Active | |
| **Mu Rho Sigma** | 2018 | Henderson, Nevada | Active | |
| **Mu Sigma Sigma** | January 26, 2019 | West Memphis, Arkansas | Active | |
| **Mu Tau Sigma** | January 26, 2019 | Killeen, Texas | Active | |
| **Mu Upsilon Sigma** | March 2, 2019 | El Paso, Texas | Active | |
| **Mu Phi Sigma** | September 28, 2019 | Dubai, United Arab Emirates | Active | |
| **Mu Chi Sigma** | October 5, 2019 | Stockton, California | Active | |
| **Mu Psi Sigma** | November 22, 2019 | Middletown, Delaware | Active | |
| **Mu Omega Sigma** | June 20, 2020 | Fredericksburg, Virginia | Active | |
| **Nu Alpha Sigma** | June 20, 2020 | Livingston, Alabama | Active | |
| **Nu Beta Sigma** | June 27, 2020 | Queens, New York | Active | |
| **Nu Gamma Sigma** | 2020 | Carbondale, Illinois | Active | |
| **Nu Delta Sigma** | September 22, 2020 | San Bernardino County, California | Active | |
| **Nu Epsilon Sigma** | November 7, 2020 | St. Augustine, Florida | Active | |
| **Nu Zeta Sigma** | December 12, 2020 | Wrens, Georgia | Active | |
| **Nu Eta Sigma** | February 22, 2020 | Schertz, Texas | Active | (Note: Chapter was formed as Nu Gamma Sigma. However, its name was changed when it was discovered that there were two chapters with that name.) |
| **Nu Theta Sigma** | March 6, 2021 | West Point, Mississippi | Active | |
| **Nu Iota Sigma** | March 17, 2021 | Hammond, Louisiana | Active | |
| Nu Kappa Sigma | November 12, 2021 | Belize | Active | |
| **Nu Lambda Sigma** | December 12, 2021 | Accra, Ghana | Active | |
| **Nu Mu Sigma** | January 22, 2022 | Hinesville, Georgia | Active | |
| **Nu Nu Sigma** | December 12, 2021 | Newberry, SC | Active | |
| **Nu Xi Sigma** | March 17, 2021 | Dublin, Georgia | Active | |
| **Nu Omicron Sigma** | April 2022 | Frederick, Maryland | Active | |
| **Nu Pi Sigma** | September 25, 2022 | Denton, Texas | Active | |
| Nu Rho Sigma | | | Inactive | |
| **Nu Sigma Sigma** | February 25, 2023 | San Marcos, Texas | Active | |
| **Nu Tau Sigma** | April 1, 2023 | Spring Valley, NY | Active | |
| **Nu Upsilon Sigma** | April 1, 2023 | Laurinburg, NC | Active | |
| **Nu Phi Sigma** | April 1, 2023 | Reading, PA | Active | |
| **Nu Chi Sigma** | April 16, 2023 | Magnolia, AR | Active | |
| **Nu Psi Sigma** | July 9, 2023 | Dallas, GA | Active | |
| **Nu Omega Sigma** | September 2, 2023 | Tupelo, MS | Active | |
| **Xi Alpha Sigma** | October 28, 2023 | Tokyo, Japan | Active | |
| **Xi Beta Sigma** | November 12, 2023 | Binghamton, NY | Active | |
| **Xi Gamma Sigma** | December 16, 2023 | Summerville, SC | Active | |
