= Annie Greene Nelson =

- Born: Annie Greene; December 1, 1902; Darlington County, South Carolina, U.S.
- Died: December 23, 1993 (aged 91); Columbia, South Carolina, U.S.
- Other name: Annie Plunkett
- Education: Voorhees College
- Known for: Writer and playwright

Photograph of Annie Plunkett (later known as Annie Elva Greene Nelson) with her infant son, John Wesley Plunkett Jr., in 1928. Date: 1928 Source: University of South Carolina Libraries Digital Collections, Roberts collection

Annie Greene Nelson (December 1, 1902 – December 23, 1993) was a writer and playwright. She was the first African American woman in South Carolina to publish a novel.

== Early life ==
Annie Greene was born at the Parrott Plantation in Darlington County, South Carolina, on December 5, 1902, to Sylvester and Nancy Greene (née Muldow). She was the eldest child of thirteen or fourteen children. Sylvester Greene was a sharecropper and a music teacher. Nelson recalled that she began reciting poetry at two years old and published a poem in a local paper as a child.

Nelson began school on the Parrots' Plantation. She later attended boarding school at Benedict College and earned a degree in education and nursing from Voorhees College in 1923. While at Voorhees, she learned about and was inspired by Elizabeth Evelyn Wright.

== Writing career ==
In 1925, Nelson first published a poem, "What Do You Think of Mother", in the Palmetto Leader. She later wrote three novels, After the Storm (1942), The Dawn Appears (1944), and Don't Walk on My Dreams (1961). A novel, Shadow of Southland, was serialized in 1952 in a Columbia newspaper, but was never issued as a book. In 1976, she wrote an unpublished autobiography, To Paw with Love. Nelson wrote two plays, Weary Fireside Blues, which was produced off-Broadway, and The Parrots' Plantation, which was staged at Brooklyn College.

Just prior to her death, Nelson worked on a manuscript called Eighty, So What?

Nelson sets her works in Pee Dee, South Carolina, recounting life for ordinary African Americans in her community. Her work differs from that by other Black writers of the 1940s and 1950s as her fiction imagines a landscape "where blacks and whites live together in harmony." She discusses the civil rights movement in Don't Walk on My Dreams and about violence by Whites against Blacks in her autobiography.

== Later life and death ==
At age 80, Nelson took courses in drama at the University of South Carolina to help her act for her one-woman show, Happenings on the Parrot Plantation.

Nelson died in Columbia, South Carolina, on December 23, 1993.

== Personal life ==
Over an almost twenty-year career, Nelson taught in Darlington and Richland Counties and worked as a nurse at Columbia Hospital, Providence Hospital, and Forest Hills Nursing Home. She founded and taught at the first kindergarten for black children in Columbia. She also served as the librarian at Waverly School in Columbia.

Nelson married twice, to John Plunkett and then to Edward Nelson Sr. She had six children.

== Awards ==
- 1994: South Carolina Black Hall of Fame
- 1989: Lucy Hampton Bostick Award, Friends of the Richland County Public Library
- 1989: Governor Carroll A. Campbell Jr. signed a proclamation honoring her for her literary accomplishments
- 1982: Arts Award for Excellence in the Arts from the Columbia Urban League
- 1980–81: Budweiser of Columbia Community Drama Award
- P. Scott Kennedy Award for her contributions to African American theater
