= Voorhees College Historic District =

Historic district in South Carolina, United States

- U.S. National Register of Historic Places
- U.S. Historic district
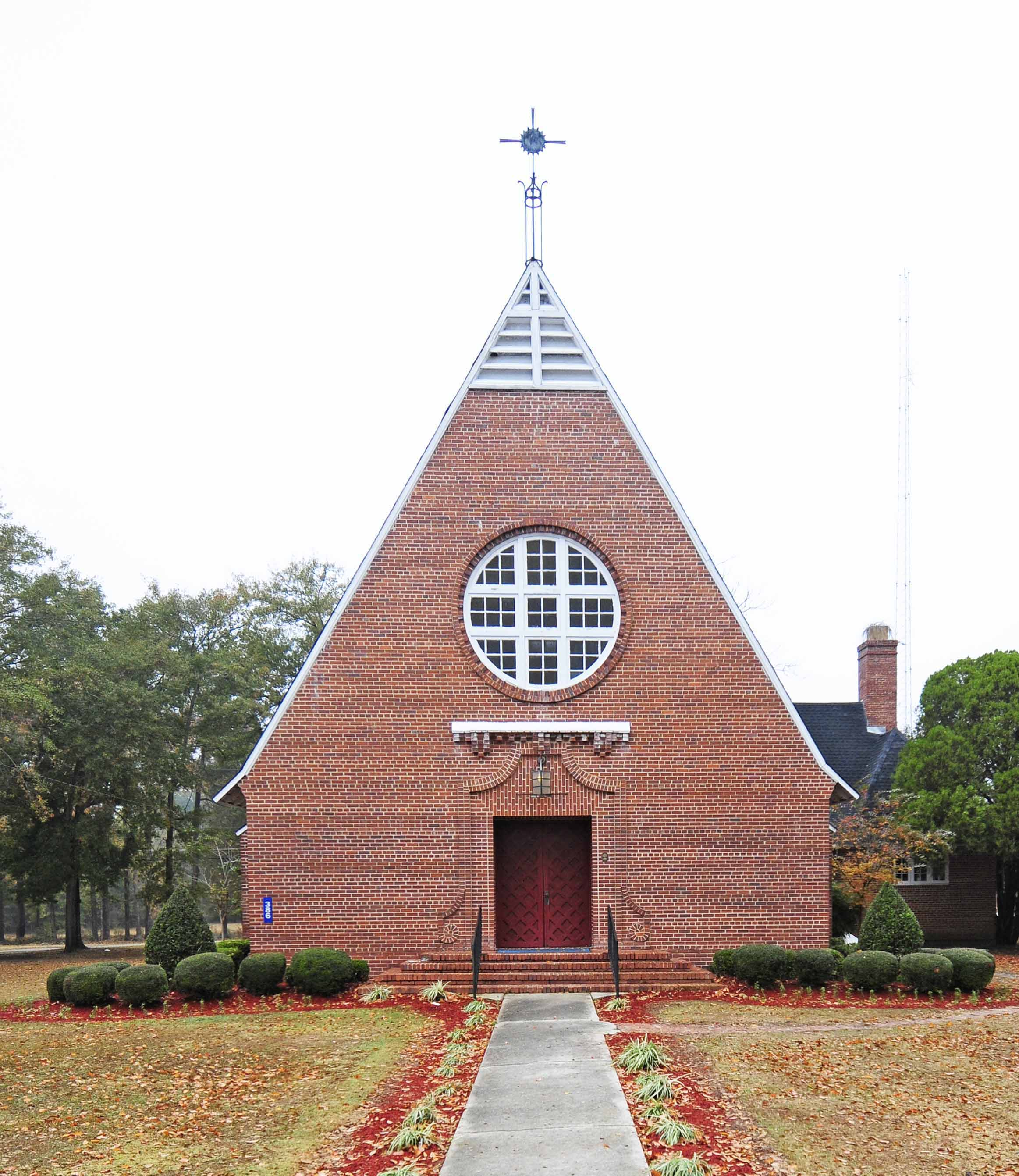
- St. Philip's Episcopal Church

- Location within South Carolina Location within the United States
- Nearest city: Denmark, South Carolina
- Coordinates: 33.30709°N 81.12798°W
- Area: 40 acres (16 ha)
- Built: 1897, 1904–1935
- NRHP reference No.: 82003830
- Added to NRHP: January 21, 1982

The Voorhees College Historic District is a historic district encompassing the campus of Voorhees College in Denmark, South Carolina. Thirteen of the nineteen buildings are contributing properties.

Voorhees College was started by Elizabeth Evelyn Wright as the Denmark Industrial School, modeled on the Tuskegee Institute, which Wright had attended. She kept close ties with her mentor, Booker T. Washington. The school was a late 19th-century effort to provide education to underserved black children in a rural area. As the school matured, it became a normal school and eventually a four-year accredited college.

The architectural and historical significance of this district is that it represents sophisticated styles for an African-American college in the early twentieth century. Many of these buildings were constructed by its students. In addition, the college was a pioneer in African-American education and associated with the notable educator and founder, Elizabeth Evelyn Wright. Photographs of some of the buildings are available.

On January 21, 1982, it was listed on the National Register of Historic Places.

Of 13 contributing properties, several have significant architectural or historic importance:

- Booker T. Washington Hall: A brick building built in 1905 as a hospital.
- Blanton Hall: A 2½ story brick building built in 1914 as an administration building. It now houses faculty, administrative staff, and classrooms.
- Menafee Trades Building: A 2-story brick building built in 1907 from a gift from Ralph Voorhees as the Boys Trade building. It was named for Martin Menafee, the college treasurer and husband of founder Elizabeth Wright.
- St. Philip's Episcopal Chapel: a brick chapel built in 1935.
- Grave site and tombstone of Elizabeth Evelyn Wright.
- Bedford Hall: a brick building built in 1912 that was named for R.C. Bedford, a member of the first Board of Trustees and aide to Booker T. Washington.
