= EIAC =

EIAC may stand for:

- Eastern Indiana Athletic Conference, an interscholastic athletic conference in the Indiana High School Athletic Association (IHSAA)
- Eastern Intercollegiate Athletic Conference, a defunct intercollegiate athletic conference in the National Association of Intercollegiate Athletics (NAIA)
- Eastern Intercollegiate Athletic Conference (1939), a defunct intercollegiate athletic conference of historically black colleges and universities (HBCUs)
