= Harvey N. Middleton =

American physician and cardiologist

- Born: February 15, 1895; Denmark, South Carolina, U.S.
- Died: March 18, 1978 (aged 83); Indianapolis, Indiana, U.S.
- Resting place: Crown Hill Cemetery and Arboretum, Section 98, Lot 1494; Indianapolis; 39.8141173°N 86.1715989°W
- Education: B.A. (1919); M.D. (1926)
- Alma mater: Benedict College; Meharry Medical College
- Occupation: physician (cardiologist)
- Board member of: Senate Avenue YMCA, Indianapolis
- Spouse: Easter (Goodnight) Middleton
- Children: three daughters, one son

Harvey N. Middleton (February 15, 1895 – March 18, 1978) was an American physician and cardiologist in Indianapolis, Indiana, who is best known for his efforts to open opportunities for black physicians to serve on the staffs of Indianapolis hospitals and for his community service. Middleton was born in Denmark, South Carolina, and received a Bachelor of Arts degree from Benedict College (1919) in Columbia, South Carolina. He attended two years of medical school at Boston University before transferring to Meharry Medical College, in Nashville, Tennessee, where he received a medical degree (M.D.) in 1926. Middleton took short courses for additional training at Harvard University; the University of London, England; the University of Michigan; Indiana University; and Michael Reese Hospital in Chicago. In 1928 Middleton moved to Anderson, Indiana, where he joined the staff of Saint Johns Hospital. Around 1935 he relocated to Indianapolis, established a private medical practice, and volunteered at Indianapolis General (City) Hospital's outpatient heart clinic. Middleton was accepted as a member of City Hospital staff in 1942 and joined the staffs at other Indianapolis hospitals. Middleton wrote several articles relating to cardiology that appear in state and national medical journals. He was a member of the American Medical Association, the National Medical Association, the American Heart Association, the Indiana State Medical Association, the Hoosier State Medical Society, and others.

Middleton, a member of the National Association for the Advancement of Colored People, was actively involved in Indianapolis philanthropic and social organizations, most notably in leadership roles in YMCA. He was particularly active in Indianapolis's Senate Avenue YMCA and its successor, Fall Creek Parkway YMCA. Middleton served on state-level YMCA committees and was a member of YMCA's national council and a delegate to YMCA's World Council (1955). He co-chaired the United Negro College Fund's Indiana fundraising campaign (1950–51) and was a board member of the Indianapolis Community Chest. Middleton was active in the Zeta Phi chapter of the Omega Psi Phi fraternity and a member of Indianapolis's Mount Paran Baptist Church. He is buried in Crown Hill Cemetery, Indianapolis, Indiana.

== Early life and education ==
Harvey Nathaniel Middleton was born on February 15, 1895, in Denmark, South Carolina. He received a Bachelor of Arts degree from Benedict College, Columbia, South Carolina, in 1919. He later recalled that as a youth he became aware of the "inferior medical treatment given to blacks" and decided to become a physician. To earn money for medical school Middleton briefly worked as a Pullman car porter during the summer of 1919. He also served in the U.S. Army during World War I.

Middleton continued his education at Boston University, where he attended the university's School of Liberal Arts for a year and its medical school for two years (1920–22) before transferring to Meharry Medical College in Nashville, Tennessee, in 1923. Middleton received a medical degree (M.D.) from Meharry Medical College in 1926. His interest in heart diseases and electrocardiography lead him to continue his professional development by taking short courses at Harvard University in Boston; the University of London, England; the University of Michigan at Ann Arbor; Indiana University School of Medicine at Indianapolis; and Michael Reese Hospital in Chicago.

== Medical career ==
Middleton briefly practiced medicine in Springfield, Tennessee, in 1928, then moved to Anderson, Indiana, where he joined the staff at Saint Johns Hospital. Around 1935 he relocated to Indianapolis and applied for a position on the staff at Indianapolis General (City) Hospital, but was unsuccessful. Middleton established a private practice in Indianapolis, where he gave electrocardiograms and specialized in treating heart irregularities, and volunteered as a clinician at City Hospital's outpatient heart clinic on Saturdays. He became a member of the hospital staff in 1942. City Hospital was renamed Wishard Memorial Hospital in 1975. A new facility, the Sidney and Lois Eskenazi Hospital, replaced it in 2013.

Middleton joined the staffs of other Indianapolis hospitals: Saint Vincent, Methodist, Community, and Winona. He also served on the staff of the Lilly Research Division at City Hospital. Middleton's article, "Phonocardiograph Studies on Heart Disease", published in the Journal of the National Medical Association (July 1943), is based on case histories from his work in Indianapolis.

Middleton was a member of several national, state, and local medical associations: the American Medical Association, the National Medical Association, the American College of Cardiology, the American Heart Association, the American College of Physians, the American Thoracic Society, the Indiana State Medical Association, the Aesculapian Society, the Indiana Thoracic Society, and the Marion County Medical Society. He wrote several articles related to cardiology that appear in state and national medical journals. Middleton was general secretary of the Hoosier State Medical Society (1953–1958) and an associate board member of the Indianapolis Hospital Development Association.

== Personal life ==
Middleton married Easter Goodnight in 1947. The couple had four children (three daughters and one son): Zenobia, Harvey N. Jr., Ettra Marie, and Brenda Pandora.

== Civic life ==
Middleton was an active civic leader, and a community service volunteer. He was a member of several philanthropic and social organizations in Indianapolis. He was especially known for his leadership roles in Indianapolis YMCA. Middleton joined the National Association for the Advancement of Colored People in 1929. While practicing medicine in Anderson, Indiana, he served as a local Boy Scout leader and became involved with the National Negro Health Week. In 1942, following his relocation to Indianapolis, Middleton served as the general chairman of National Negro Health Week.

Middleton maintained an association of more than fifty years with the YMCA, especially the Indianapolis Senate Avenue YMCA and its successor, the Fall Creek Parkway YMCA. Middleton began serving on the Senate Avenue YMCA board in 1945 and was general chairman of its membership campaigns (1938 and 1947). He served as president of the Senate Avenue YMCA (1951) and took a leading role in fundraising for a new branch, which opened on Fall Creek Parkway in 1959. Middleton was chairman of the Fall Creek Parkway YMCA. He served on state-level YMCA committees and was a member of the national council. In 1955 Middleton and his family traveled to Paris, France, where he was a delegate to the International YMCA Conference.

In addition to his service to Indianapolis YMCAs, Middleton was involved with the United Negro College Fund and co-chaired its state fundraising campaign (1950–51). Middleton remained an active alumni of Meharry Medical College, where he served five years as a class agent and organized his class's 50th reunion in 1976. He was an active in the Zeta Phi chapter of the Omega Psi Phi fraternity and a member of the Mount Paran Baptist Church in Indianapolis.

== Death and legacy ==
Middleton died on March 18, 1978, at Methodist Hospital in Indianapolis. Funeral services were held on March 23, 1978, at the Mount Paran Baptist Church in Indianapolis. He is buried in Crown Hill Cemetery, Indianapolis.

== Works ==
Published journal articles:

- "True Congenital Dextrocardia with Situs Inversus Corroborated by Electrocardiographic and X-Ray Findings", Journal of the Indiana State Medical Association (October 1937)
- "Phonocardiograph Studies on Heart Disease", Journal of the National Medical Association (July 1943)
- "The Electrocardiographic Diagnosis and Treatment in Recent Coronary Occlusion", Journal of the Indiana State Medical Association (February 1943)
- "Diagnoisis and Prognosis of Bundle-Branch Block", Journal of the Indiana State Medical Association (February 1945)
- "Electrocariographic Studies of Gunshot and Stab Wounds of the Heart", American Heart Journal (December 1947)
- "Electrocardiographic Diagnosis and Prognosis of Recent Coronary Thrombosis or Occlusion", Journal of the Indiana State Medical Association (July 1947)
- "The Diagnosis and Management of Cardiac Arrhythmias", Journal of the National Medical Association (March 1949)
- "The Value of the Electrocardiogram in Digitalis Therapy", Annual Bulletin of the Hoosier State Medical Association (August 1954)

== Honors and awards ==
- Inducted into the Indiana State Medical Association's 50-Year Club in 1976.
- Named Man of the Year by the Fall Creek YMCA in Indianapolis, Indiana, in 1977.

== Tributes ==
The Indiana Historical Society recreated the setting of Middleton's 1939 medical office for one of its "You Are There" exhibitions at the Eugene and Marilyn Glick Indiana History Center in Indianapolis.
