= Denmark High School (South Carolina) =

- U.S. National Register of Historic Places
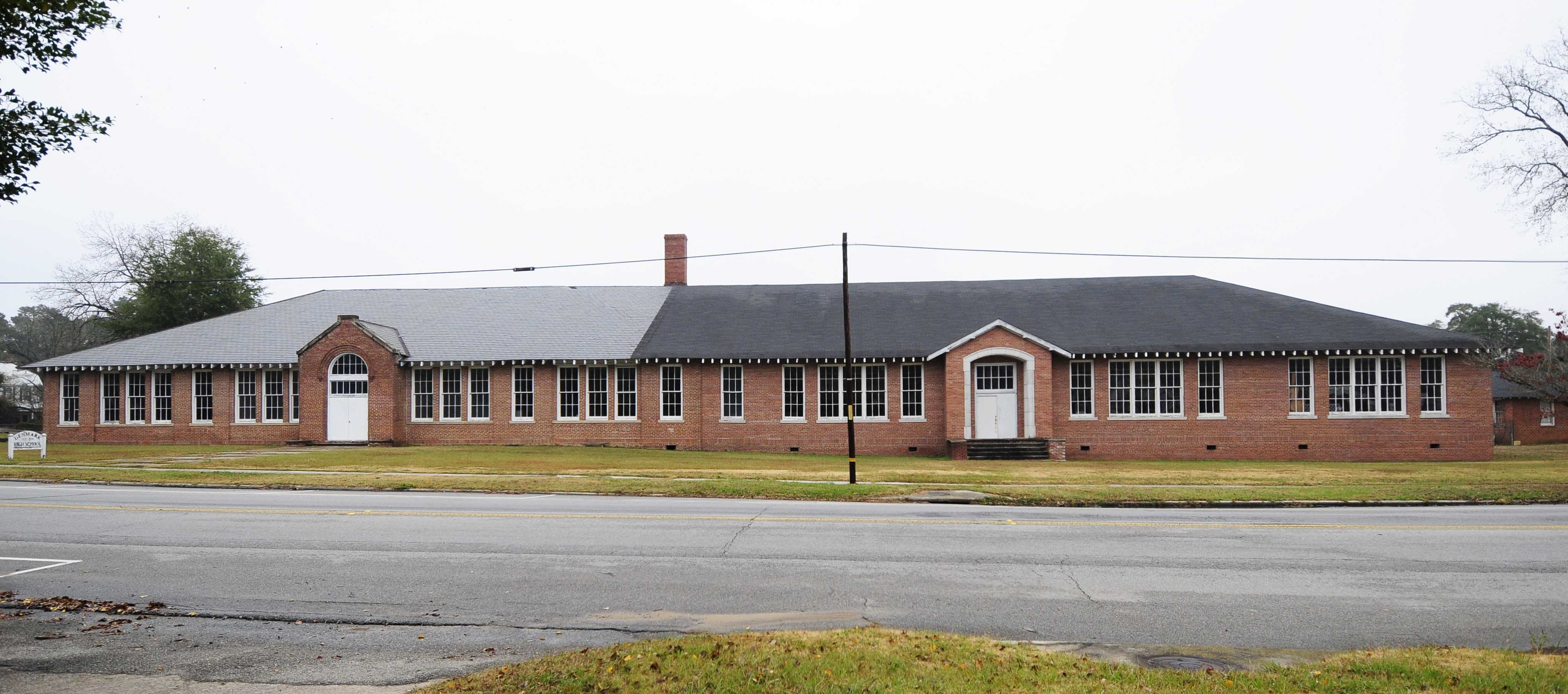

- Location within South Carolina Location within the United States
- Location: N. Palmetto Ave., Denmark, South Carolina
- Coordinates: 33°19′42″N 81°8′26″W
- Area: 2.2 acres (0.89 ha)
- Built: 1920
- Architectural style: Classical Revival
- NRHP reference No.: 01000297
- Added to NRHP: March 29, 2001

Denmark High School, located in Denmark, South Carolina, is significant as an example of Classical Revival educational architecture. The school, built in 1920, enlarged in 1932 and again in 1948, served the educational needs of the town from 1920–1985. It was listed in the National Register of Historic Places on March 29, 2001.
