= Eastern Intercollegiate Athletic Conference =

The Eastern Intercollegiate Athletic Conference was a conference of historically Black colleges and universities (HBCU's) that participated in the NAIA's Division I, with member institutions in Florida, North Carolina, and South Carolina. It was founded in 1983 by several members of the defunct Southeastern Athletic Conference.

The EIAC disbanded in 2005. Barber-Scotia lost its accreditation and can no longer field athletics teams, while former members Benedict and Claflin moved up to the NCAA's Division II. The remaining members currently compete as NAIA independents.

== Member schools ==
=== Final members ===
The EIAC had five final full members; all were private schools:

Institution	Location	Founded	Affiliation	Enrollment	Nickname	Joined (Note: Represents the calendar year when fall sports competition begins.)	Left (Note: Represents the calendar year when spring sports competition ends.)	Subsequent conference(s)	Current conference
Allen University	Columbia, South Carolina	1870	AME Church	600	Yellow Jackets	1983	2005	NAIA Independent (2005–16); Appalachian (AAC) (2016–20)	Southern (SIAC) (Note: Currently an NCAA Division II athletic conference.) (2020–present)
Barber–Scotia College	Concord, North Carolina	1867	Presbyterian	120?	Mighty Sabres	1983	2005	Dropped athletics	Independent
Edward Waters College (Note: Currently known as Edward Waters University since 2021.)	Jacksonville, Florida	1866	AME Church	966	Tigers	1983	2005	various (Note: Edward Waters had joined the following subsequent conferences: as an NAIA Independent during the 2005–06 school year; the Florida Sun Conference from 2006–07 to 2009–10; and the Gulf Coast Athletic Conference from 2010–11 to 2020–21.)	Southern (SIAC) (2021–present)
Morris College	Sumter, South Carolina	1908	Baptist	871	Hornets	1983	2005	NAIA Independent/Continental (2005–present)	
Voorhees College (Note: Currently known as Voorhees University since 2022.)	Denmark, South Carolina	1897	Episcopal Church	600	Tigers	1983	2005	various (Note: Voorhees had joined the following subsequent conferences: as an NAIA Independent from 2005–06 to 2012–13, and again from 2015–16 to 2023–24; and the Gulf Coast Athletic Conference (GCAC) from 2013–14 to 2014–15.)	HBCU (HBCUAC) (2024–present)

=== Other members ===
The EIAC had three other former full members; all were private schools:

Institution	Location	Founded	Affiliation	Enrollment	Nickname	Joined (Note: Represents the calendar year when fall sports competition begins.)	Left (Note: Represents the calendar year when spring sports competition ends.)	Subsequent conference(s)	Current conference
Benedict College	Columbia, South Carolina	1870	Baptist	2,500	Tigers	1988	2002	Southern (SIAC) (Note: Currently an NCAA Division II athletic conference.) (2002–present)	
Claflin University (Note: Formerly known as Claflin College until 1999.)	Orangeburg, South Carolina	1869	United Methodist	1,978	Panthers	1983	2005	D-II Independent (2005–08); Southern (SIAC) (2008–18)	Central (CIAA) (2018–present)
Columbia College (Note: This institution was a women's college, but has since then been a co-educational institution, therefore it does compete in some men's sports [Columbia (S.C.) since 2020–21].)	Columbia, South Carolina	1854	United Methodist	1,200	Fighting Koalas	2004	2005	Southern States (SSAC) (2005–11)	Appalachian (AAC) (2011–present)

=== Membership timeline ===
Full member (all sports) Full member (non-football) Associate member (football) Associate member (sport)
