= Govan, South Carolina =

- Town
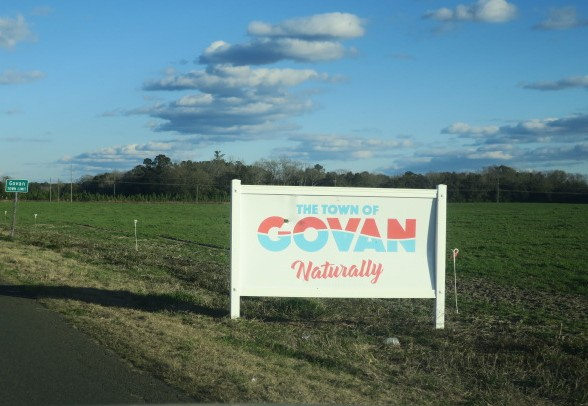

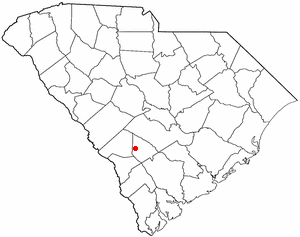
- Location of Govan, South Carolina
- Coordinates: 33°13′N 81°10′W
- Country: United States
- State: South Carolina
- County: Bamberg

Area
  - Total: 0.75 sq mi (1.95 km^{2})
  - Land: 0.75 sq mi (1.95 km^{2})
  - Water: 0 sq mi (0.00 km^{2})
- Elevation: 240 ft (73 m)

Population (2020)
  - Total: 56
  - Density: 74.5/sq mi (28.76/km^{2})
- Time zone: UTC-5 (Eastern (EST))
  - Summer (DST): UTC-4 (EDT)
- ZIP code: 29843
- Area code: 803
- FIPS code: 45-29950
- GNIS feature ID: 1222786

Govan is a town in Bamberg County, South Carolina, United States. As of the 2020 census, Govan had a population of 56.

== History ==
Govan is named for the Govan family of South Carolina.

== Geography ==
Govan is located in western Bamberg County at 33°13′N 81°10′W (33.2209, -81.1727). U.S. Route 321 passes through the town, leading north 7 miles (11 km) to Denmark and south 19 miles (31 km) to Fairfax.

According to the United States Census Bureau, the town has a total area of 0.73 square miles (1.9 km^{2}), all of it land.

== Demographics ==
Historical population
Census	Pop.	Note	%±
1900	113		—
1910	111		−1.8%
1920	124		11.7%
1930	106		−14.5%
1940	113		6.6%
1950	109		−3.5%
1960	138		26.6%
1970	136		−1.4%
1980	109		−19.9%
1990	84		−22.9%
2000	67		−20.2%
2010	65		−3.0%
2020	56		−13.8%
U.S. Decennial Census

As of the census of 2000, there were 67 people, 30 households, and 21 families residing in the town. The population density was 88.8 inhabitants per square mile (34.3/km^{2}). There were 37 housing units at an average density of 49.0 per square mile (18.9/km^{2}). The racial makeup of the town was 71.64% White and 28.36% African American.

There were 30 households, out of which 20.0% had children under the age of 18 living with them, 56.7% were married couples living together, 13.3% had a female householder with no husband present, and 26.7% were non-families. 26.7% of all households were made up of individuals, and 13.3% had someone living alone who was 65 years of age or older. The average household size was 2.23 and the average family size was 2.68.

In the town, the population was spread out, with 14.9% under the age of 18, 6.0% from 18 to 24, 17.9% from 25 to 44, 37.3% from 45 to 64, and 23.9% who were 65 years of age or older. The median age was 49 years. For every 100 females, there were 81.1 males. For every 100 females age 18 and over, there were 90.0 males.

The median income for a household in the town was $20,313, and the median income for a family was $21,875. Males had a median income of $23,750 versus $25,625 for females. The per capita income for the town was $8,834. There were 28.6% of families and 23.9% of the population living below the poverty line, including no under eighteens and 46.7% of those over 64.

== Education ==
Since 2022 it is a part of the Bamberg County School District. Prior to 2022, it was in the Bamberg School District Two. The public high school is Denmark-Olar High School.
