= Denmark, South Carolina =

- City
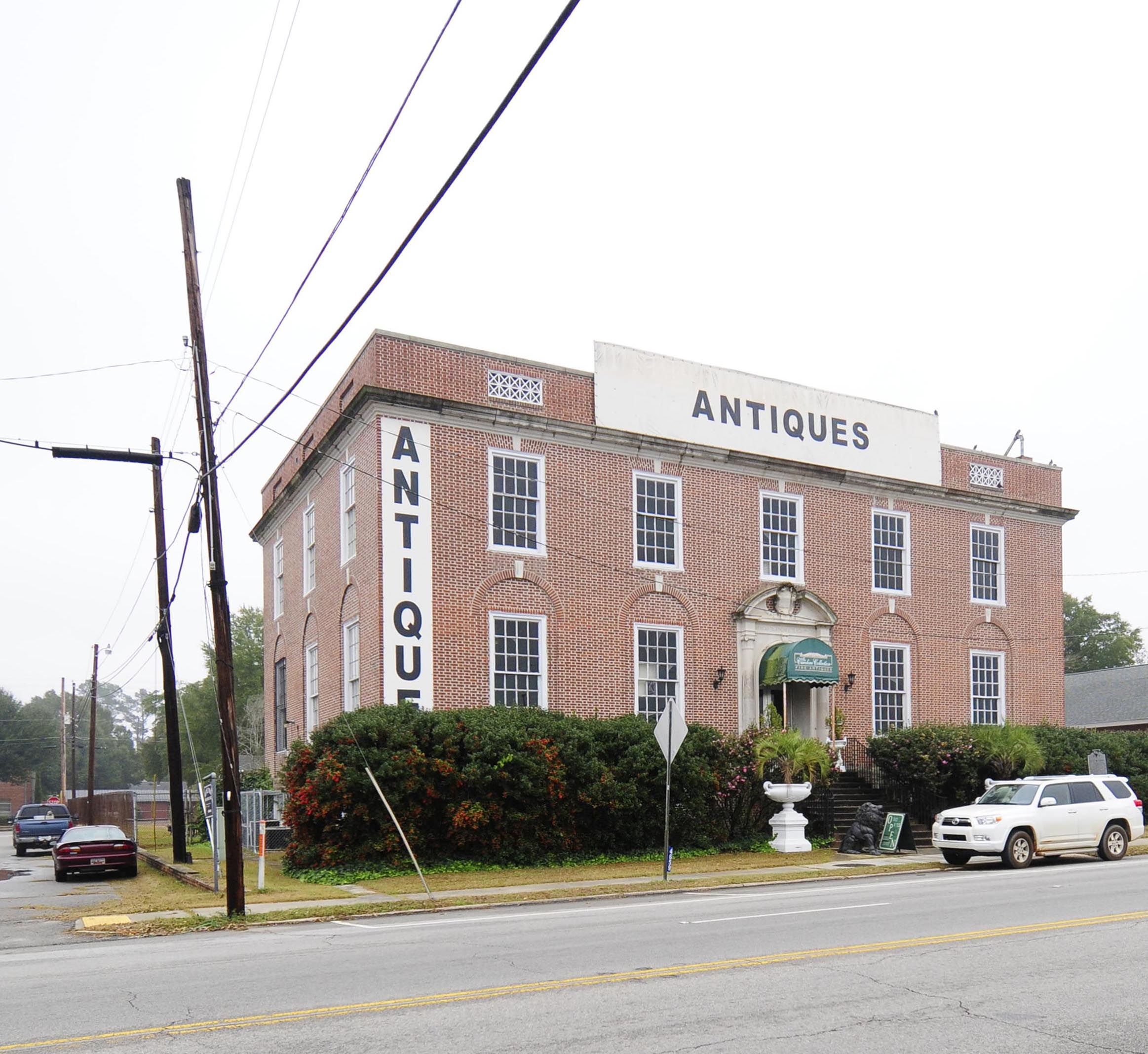
- The American Telephone and Telegraph Company Building

- Flag Seal
- Nickname: "City of Pride"
- Motto: "Home of the Dogwood Festival"
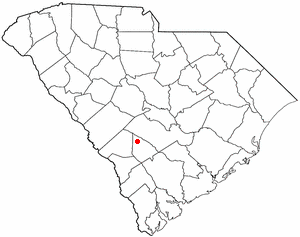
- Location of Denmark, South Carolina
- Coordinates: 33°19′16″N 81°8′32″W
- Country: United States
- State: South Carolina
- County: Bamberg

Government
  - Type: Mayor-Council-Commission
  - Mayor: Harold Johnson

Area
  - Total: 3.91 sq mi (10.13 km^{2})
  - Land: 3.91 sq mi (10.12 km^{2})
  - Water: 0.0039 sq mi (0.01 km^{2})
- Elevation: 246 ft (75 m)

Population (2020)
  - Total: 3,186
  - Density: 815.7/sq mi (314.94/km^{2})
- Time zone: UTC−05:00 (Eastern (EST))
  - Summer (DST): UTC−04:00 (EDT)
- ZIP Code: 29042
- Area codes: 803, 839
- FIPS code: 45-19105
- GNIS feature ID: 1247519
- Website: https://cityofdenmarksc.com/

Denmark is a city in Bamberg County, South Carolina, United States. As of the 2020 census, Denmark had a population of 3,186.

== Geography ==
Denmark is located in northwest Bamberg County at 33°19′16″N 81°8′32″W (33.321173, -81.142289). U.S. Route 78 and U.S. Route 321 cross in Denmark just north of the downtown area. US 78 leads east 6 miles (10 km) to Bamberg, the county seat, and west 8 miles (13 km) to Blackville. US 321 leads north 9 miles (14 km) to Norway and south 7 miles (11 km) to Govan.

According to the United States Census Bureau, the city has a total area of 3.8 square miles (9.9 km^{2}), of which 0.004 square miles (0.01 km^{2}), or 0.09%, is water.

== Demographics ==
Historical population
Census	Pop.	Note	%±
1890	366		—
1900	724		97.8%
1910	1,075		48.5%
1920	1,254		16.7%
1930	1,713		36.6%
1940	2,056		20.0%
1950	2,814		36.9%
1960	3,221		14.5%
1970	3,571		10.9%
1980	4,434		24.2%
1990	3,762		−15.2%
2000	3,328		−11.5%
2010	3,538		6.3%
2020	3,186		−9.9%
U.S. Decennial Census

=== Racial and ethnic composition ===
Denmark city, South Carolina – Racial and ethnic composition Note: the US Census treats Hispanic/Latino as an ethnic category. This table excludes Latinos from the racial categories and assigns them to a separate category. Hispanics/Latinos may be of any race.
Race / Ethnicity (NH = Non-Hispanic)	Pop 2000	Pop 2010	Pop 2020	% 2000	% 2010	% 2020
White alone (NH)	419	303	216	12.59%	8.56%	6.78%
Black or African American alone (NH)	2,840	3,172	2,859	85.34%	89.66%	89.74%
Native American or Alaska Native alone (NH)	3	3	2	0.09%	0.08%	0.06%
Asian alone (NH)	17	10	20	0.51%	0.28%	0.63%
Native Hawaiian or Pacific Islander alone (NH)	0	2	0	0.00%	0.06%	0.00%
Other race alone (NH)	2	3	13	0.06%	0.08%	0.41%
Mixed race or Multiracial (NH)	22	14	57	0.66%	0.40%	1.79%
Hispanic or Latino (any race)	25	31	19	0.75%	0.88%	0.60%
Total	3,328	3,538	3,186	100.00%	100.00%	100.00%

=== 2020 census ===
As of the 2020 census, there were 3,186 people, 972 households, and 518 families residing in the city. The median age was 32.7 years. 19.4% of residents were under the age of 18 and 17.9% of residents were 65 years of age or older. For every 100 females there were 81.7 males, and for every 100 females age 18 and over there were 77.5 males age 18 and over.

There were 1,127 households in Denmark, of which 31.0% had children under the age of 18 living in them. Of all households, 22.1% were married-couple households, 23.0% were households with a male householder and no spouse or partner present, and 50.2% were households with a female householder and no spouse or partner present. About 34.7% of all households were made up of individuals and 17.1% had someone living alone who was 65 years of age or older.

There were 1,405 housing units, of which 19.8% were vacant. The homeowner vacancy rate was 3.8% and the rental vacancy rate was 3.0%.

0.0% of residents lived in urban areas, while 100.0% lived in rural areas.

Racial composition as of the 2020 census
Race	Number	Percent
White	220	6.9%
Black or African American	2,865	89.9%
American Indian and Alaska Native	3	0.1%
Asian	22	0.7%
Native Hawaiian and Other Pacific Islander	0	0.0%
Some other race	17	0.5%
Two or more races	59	1.9%

=== 2000 census ===
As of the census of 2000, there were 3,328 people, 1,331 households, and 846 families residing in the city. The population density was 1,096.0 inhabitants per square mile (423.2/km^{2}). There were 1,537 housing units at an average density of 506.2 per square mile (195.4/km^{2}). The racial makeup of the city was 85.91% African American, 12.74% White, 0.09% Native American, 0.51% Asian, 0.06% from other races, and 0.69% from two or more races. Hispanic or Latino of any race were 0.75% of the population.

There were 1,331 households, out of which 29.8% had children under the age of 18 living with them, 30.2% were married couples living together, 27.5% had a female householder with no husband present, and 36.4% were non-families. 32.0% of all households were made up of individuals, and 11.7% had someone living alone who was 65 years of age or older. The average household size was 2.47 and the average family size was 3.15.

In the city, the population was spread out, with 26.8% under the age of 18, 9.7% from 18 to 24, 24.7% from 25 to 44, 24.1% from 45 to 64, and 14.7% who were 65 years of age or older. The median age was 36 years. For every 100 females, there were 85.6 males. For every 100 females age 18 and over, there were 82.6 males.

The median income for a household in the city was $17,578, and the median income for a family was $22,346. Males had a median income of $22,110 versus $13,767 for females. The per capita income for the city was $11,243. About 33.4% of families and 35.2% of the population were below the poverty line, including 51.9% of those under age 18 and 30.8% of those age 65 or over.

== History ==
Cleveland Sellers oral history interview conducted by John Dittmer in Denmark, South Carolina, 2013 March 21.

Cleveland Sellers shares memories of growing up in Denmark, South Carolina, especially the influence of Voorhees College in the community. He organized a Youth Chapter of the National Association for the Advancement of Colored People (NAACP) in Denmark, and he describes the group's activities. He discusses his first impressions of Howard University, where he joined the Nonviolent Action Group (NAG). He shares memories of the March on Washington and the role of students in organizing it, his involvement in the Student Nonviolent Coordinating Committee (SNCC), and his role in the Mississippi Freedom Project. He also describes the goals of the Mississippi Freedom Democratic Party and the tensions that developed within SNCC in the late 1960s.

Denmark was originally called Grahams Turnout, as it was founded in the 1830s for a railroad extension and turnout. It was later renamed after B. A. Denmark, a railroad official.

In April 1893, Mamie Baxter, a fourteen-year-old girl in Denmark, alleged that an African American unknown to her had attempted to attack her. John Peterson, a suspect, appealed to South Carolina Governor Benjamin Tillman for protection, fearing he would be lynched if taken to Denmark, and saying he could prove his innocence. He was taken by the mob, put on "trial" and, after the mob found him guilty, was murdered by hanging.

Shown Peterson before the crowd killed him, Baxter reportedly testified:

"I don't know him sir, that don't look like him at all. He is the same color, that's all. He don't talk like the man; he is thinner in the face, he was as dark as this man, but his eyes don't look like him."

=== Historic sites ===
The American Telephone and Telegraph Company Building, Denmark High School, and the Voorhees College Historic District, part of the campus of the historically black college, are listed on the National Register of Historic Places.

== Transport ==
Amtrak, the national passenger rail system, serves Denmark, operating its Floridian daily in each direction, between Miami, Florida by way of Tampa, Jacksonville, and Savannah, and New York, New York by way of Columbia, Richmond, Washington, and Philadelphia.

== Parks ==
- Ceceile Playground and Court
- Simons Davis Park
- The Art Park

== Education ==
Denmark contains two colleges: Denmark Technical College and Voorhees University.

Since 2022 it is a part of the Bamberg County School District. Prior to 2022, it was in the Bamberg School District Two. The public high school is Denmark-Olar High School.

The Denmark-Olar schools had been co-located, after an expansion of the high school campus, since circa 2019.

Denmark has a public library, a branch of the ABBE Regional Library System.

== Arts and culture ==
Denmark is home to the Dog Wood Festival, which is a festival that includes rides, games, and food/drink stands and was originally hosted 517.01 ft (15758.4648 cm [estimated]) from Beech Ave to South Beech Ave, but was moved to Cypress St as of 2019. According to the history of the Dog Wood, it first began in the year of 1985 and still goes on once a year. This usually happens in April on a sunny day. This festival benefits the community.

== Notable people ==
- Elizabeth Evelyn Wright, founder of Voorhees College.
- Cleveland Sellers, American educator and civil rights activist.
- Bakari Sellers, American attorney and politician. He served in the South Carolina House of Representatives for the 90th District from 2006-2014.
- Harvey N. Middleton, American physician who advocated for black physicians' rights.
