= Elizabeth Evelyn Wright =

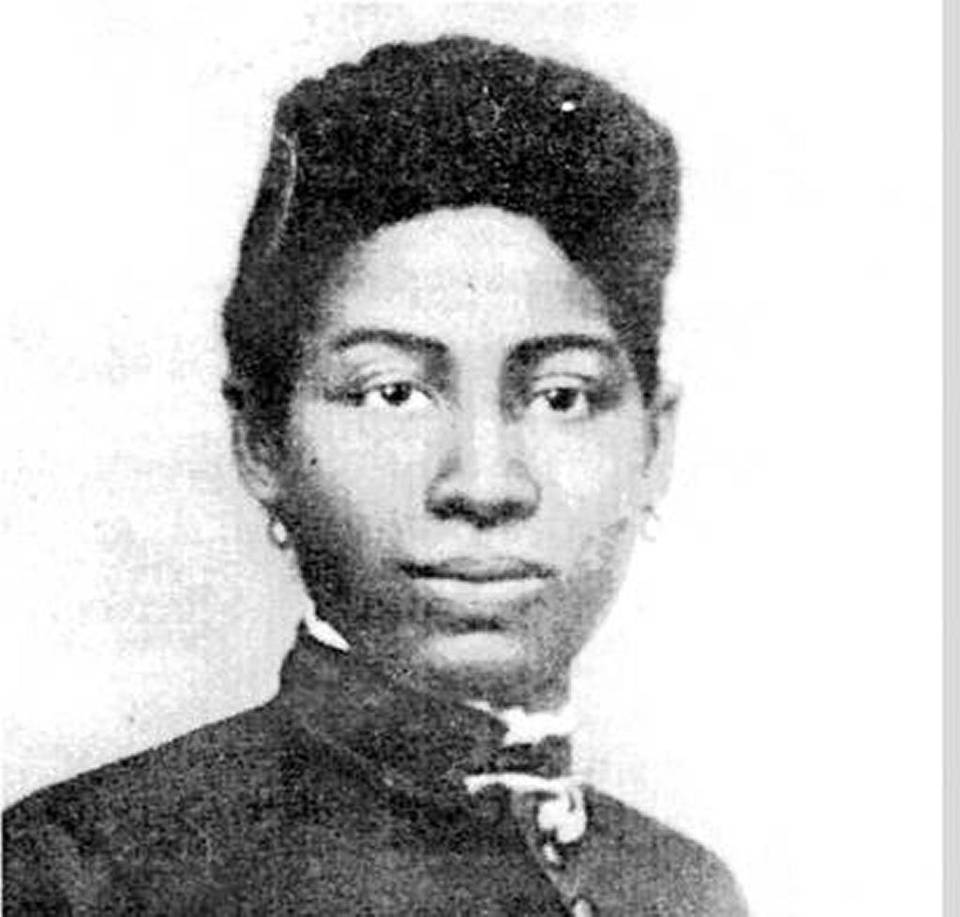
- Born: April 3, 1872; Talbotton, Georgia, U.S.
- Died: December 14, 1906 (aged 34); Battle Creek, Michigan, U.S.
- Resting place: Voorhees College
- Education: Tuskegee Institute
- Occupation: Educator
- Known for: Founding Voorhees University
- Title: Principal
- Spouse: Martin A. Menafee
- Parent(s): John Wesley Wright and Virginia Rolfe

Elizabeth Evelyn Wright (April 3, 1872 – December 14, 1906) was an American humanitarian and educator, founding several schools for black children. She founded Denmark Industrial Institute in Denmark, South Carolina, as a school for African-American youth. It is present-day Voorhees University, a historically black college (HBCU).

== Early life and education ==
Wright was born on April 3, 1872, in rural Talbotton, Georgia. Her father, John Wesley Wright, was an African-American carpenter. Her mother, Virginia Rolfe, was a Cherokee woman. Wright went to a school held in a church basement.

In 1888, she matriculated at Booker T. Washington's Tuskegee Institute as a night student. After two years, Wright moved to Hampton County, South Carolina, to assist in a rural school for black children. After the school was burned, she returned to Tuskegee and graduated.

== Career ==
Inspired by her experience at Tuskegee and knowing the importance of education, Wright started several schools in the area of Denmark, but they failed due to arson, jealousy, or other reasons. Wright started a night school for African-American men in Hampton County.

In 1897, she moved to Denmark in rural Bamberg County, South Carolina. There she started a school over a store with the support of some influential people in the community. She raised money for what she called Denmark Industrial School, modeled after Tuskegee Institute.

Ralph Voorhees and his wife, philanthropists from Clinton, New Jersey, donated $5,000 for the purchase of land and construction of the school's first building. In 1902 Voorhees Industrial School opened for male and female students at the elementary and high school levels, and Wright was principal. Voorhees provided additional gifts during the next few years, and the General Assembly incorporated the school in his name.

For years this was the only high school for blacks in the area.

The school was later affiliated with the Protestant Episcopal Church and eventually became a fully accredited four-year college.

== Marriage ==
In 1906 Wright married Martin A. Menafee, treasurer of Voorhees College. Shortly after her marriage, she became ill. She went to the well-known Battle Creek Sanitarium in Michigan for medical treatment but died there on December 14, 1906.

Wright was buried on the Voorhees College campus.

Academic offices
Preceded by New position	Principal of Vorhees Industrial School; 1902-1906	Succeeded by Gabriel Miller
