= Voorhees University =

Private university in Denmark, South Carolina, US

- Former names: Denmark Industrial School for African Americans (1897–1902); Voorhees Industrial Institute for Colored Youths (1902–1947); Voorhees School and Junior College (1947–1962); Voorhees College (1962–2022)
- Type: Private historically black university
- Established: April 14, 1897; 129 years ago
- Religious affiliation: Episcopal Church
- Academic affiliations: NAICU; UNCF
- Endowment: $10 million (2021)
- President: Ronnie Hopkins
- Students: 507
- Undergraduates: 473
- Postgraduates: 34
- Location: Denmark, South Carolina, United States; 33°18′32.61″N 81°7′41.51″W
- Campus: Rural
- Colors: Royal Blue & White
- Sporting affiliations: NAIA – HBCUAC
- Mascot: Tiger
- Website: www.voorhees.edu

Voorhees University (formerly Voorhees College) is a private historically black university in Denmark, South Carolina, United States. It is affiliated with the Episcopal Church and accredited by the Southern Association of Colleges and Schools.

== History ==
On April 14, 1897, Elizabeth Evelyn Wright founded Denmark Industrial School for African Americans. Located in a rural area and the small town of Denmark, it was modeled on the well-known Tuskegee Institute of Alabama. The first classes were held on the second floor of an old store. Its first class was fourteen students, taught by two teachers.

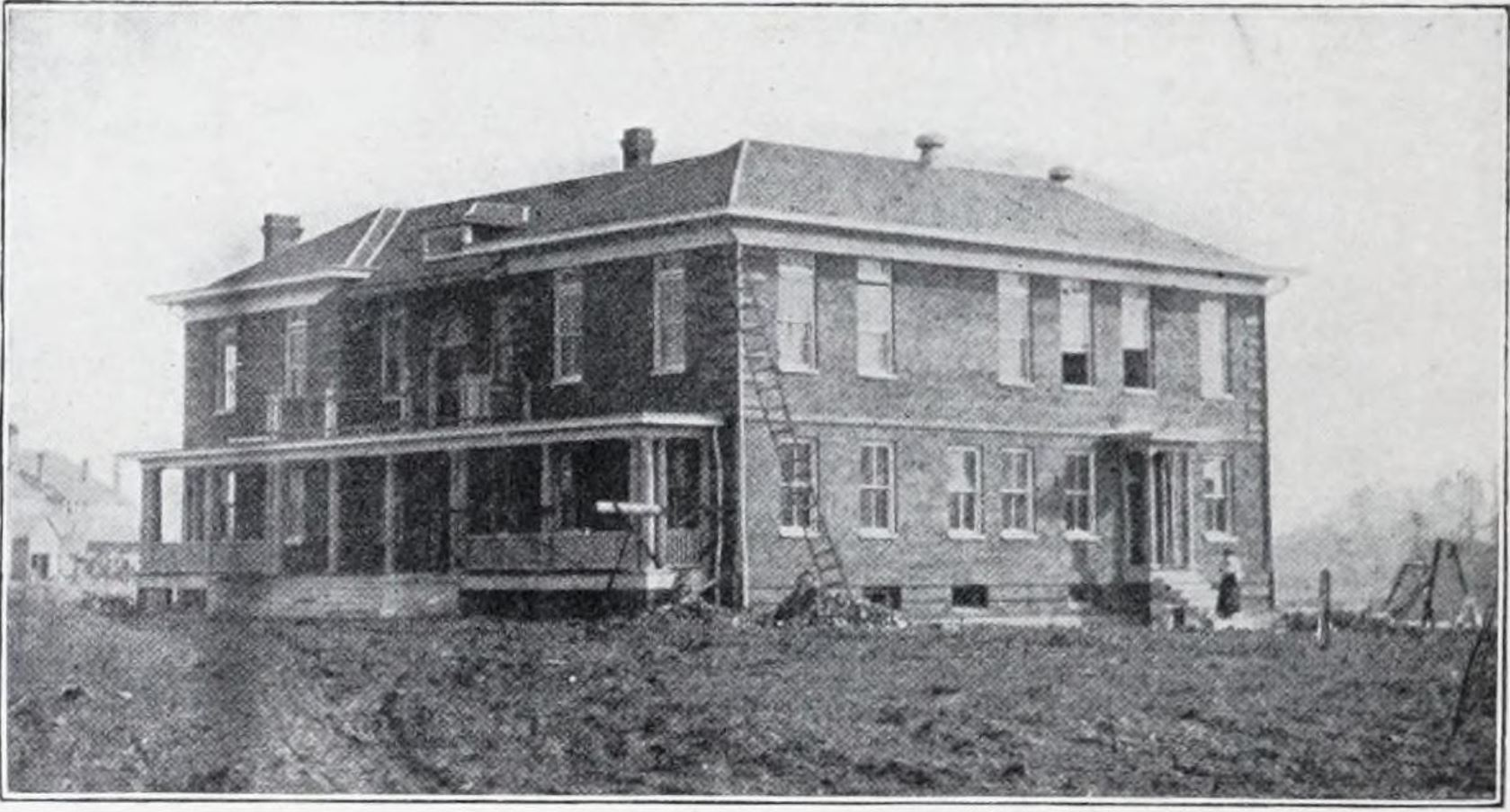
Voorhees Industrial School, c. 1910

In 1902, Ralph Voorhees, a philanthropist in Clinton, New Jersey, donated $5,000 (equivalent to $186,000 in 2025) to the school in order to purchase land and construct buildings. The school used the donation to purchase 250 acres of land from Capt. J.B. Guess for $4,500 (equivalent to $167,000 in 2025) and to build a school building on the land. The school moved to the new location in October 1902.

In 1904, the South Carolina General Assembly renamed the school and incorporated it as the Voorhees Industrial Institute for Colored Youths.

In 1924, the school was affiliated with the Episcopal Diocese of South Carolina. In 1947, its name was changed to Voorhees School and Junior College. In 1962, with the addition of departments and four-year curriculum, it became accredited as Voorhees College.

In 1969, the school's predominantly Black student body demanded more Black study programs and the hiring of Black faculty, as well as outreach to assist the local lower income community of Denmark with scholarships. The Voorhees administration, made up of mostly Whites, ignored the students' plea. A demonstration of 500 students began as a response, which eventually inspired 75 students to command a two-day armed student occupation of the college. The president of Voorhees agreed to the students' demands, but filed a formal request to the South Carolina National Guard to subdue the students. The protesters surrendered but were subsequently arrested. Many were suspended.

In 2020, philanthropist MacKenzie Scott donated $4 million to Voorhees College. Her donation is the second-largest single gift in Voorhees' history.

The institution changed its name to Voorhees University in 2022 when it celebrated its 125th anniversary.

In 2025, Voorhees University received an additional $19 million from MacKenzie Scott which is the largest donation in Voorhees' history.

== Voorhees College Historic District ==
This historic district was listed on the National Register of Historic Places on January 21, 1982. It includes thirteen contributing buildings constructed from 1905 to 1935. The historic district is noteworthy as an example of pioneering education for African Americans in the early 20th century, and for its association with co-founder Elizabeth Evelyn Wright. In addition, the buildings, constructed mostly by students, showed ambitious design and masonry techniques. Many of these buildings were constructed by the students of Voorhees College as part of their crafts program. Photographs of some of the buildings are available.

== Academics ==
Voorhees describes itself as a career-oriented liberal arts college, "offer[ing] each student an intensive general educational experience coupled with professional education". Its academic schools are:

- School of Business and Entrepreneurship
- School of Humanities, Education, and Social Sciences
- School of Science, Technology, Health & Human Services
- School of Graduate Studies
- W. Franklin Evans Honors College

The general education core curriculum includes courses related to communication, mathematics, science, health, cross-cultural learning, and career development.

== Athletics ==
The Voorhees athletics teams are called the Tigers and Lady Tigers. The college is a member of the National Association of Intercollegiate Athletics (NAIA), primarily competing as a member of the HBCU Athletic Conference since the 2024-2025 academic year; which they were a member on a previous stint from 2013–14 to 2014–15 when the HBCUAC was known as the Gulf Coast Athletic Conference (GCAC). The Tigers previously competed as an NAIA Independent from 2005-06 to 2012-13 and between 2015-16 and 2023-24. They also competed in the defunct Eastern Intercollegiate Athletic Conference (EIAC) from 1983–84 to 2004–05.

Voorhees competes in ten intercollegiate varsity sports: Men's sports include baseball, basketball, cheerleading, cross country and track & field; women's sports include basketball, cheerleading, cross country, softball and track & field.

== Student life ==
The university has cheerleaders, choir, band, Student Government Association, special interest groups, fraternities, and sororities on campus.

== Notable alumni ==
- Jackie Dinkins - NBA player with the Chicago Bulls
- Lester Oliver Bankhead (1912–1997), American architect and class of 1941, born in Union, South Carolina and active in Los Angeles, California
- Annie Greene Nelson (1902-1993), American writer and class of 1923
