= 1949 Norfolk State Baby Trojans football team =

American college football season

1949 Norfolk State Spartans football

EIAC champion
- Conference: Eastern Intercollegiate Athletic Conference
- Record: 6–0 (5–0 EIAC)
- Head coach: Leroy Porter (4th season)
- Home stadium: High Rock Park, Foreman Field

1949 Eastern Intercollegiate Athletic Conference football standings
	Conf.					Overall
Team	W		L		T	W		L		T
Norfolk State $	5	–	0	–	0	6	–	0	–	0
Morristown	4	–	1	–	0	8	–	2	–	1
Storer	3	–	2	–	0	?	–	?	–	?
Elizabeth City State	3	–	2	–	1	4	–	3	–	1
Fayetteville State	1	–	3	–	1	2	–	5	–	1
Livingstone	1	–	4	–	0	2	–	4	–	0
Virginia Seminary	1	–	4	–	0	?	–	?	–	?
Friendship	0	–	2	–	0	?	–	?	–	?
$ – Conference champion; Standings were based on Dickinson System ratings.

The 1949 Norfolk State Baby Trojans football team represented Norfolk State College—now known as Norfolk State University—as a member of the Eastern Intercollegiate Athletic Conference (EIAC) during the 1949 college football season. Led by fourth-year head coach Leroy Porter, the Baby Trojans compiled a perfect overall record of 6–0, with a mark of 5–0 in conference play, winning the EIAC title. Norfolk State played home games at High Rock Park and Foreman Field in Norfolk, Virginia

== Schedule ==
Date	Time	Opponent	Site	Result	Attendance	Source
October 8	8:00 p.m.	Livingstone	High Rock Park; Norfolk, VA	W 28–0		
October 15		at Virginia Seminary	Lynchburg, VA	W 6–0		
October 29	8:00 p.m.	Hampton B team*	High Rock Park; Norfolk, VA	W 21–6		
November 5	7:30 p.m.	Fayetteville State^{†}	Foreman Field; Norfolk, VA	W 25–12	1,000	
November 12	2:30 p.m.	Storer	High Rock Park; Norfolk, VA	W 14–6		
November 24		at Elizabeth City State	Elizabeth City, NC	W 7–6		
*Non-conference game; ^{†}Homecoming; All times are in Eastern time
