= Leroy Porter =

American football and basketball coach, educator

Biographical details
- Born: c. 1920

Playing career

Football
- 1942–1944: Virginia State
- Positions: Fullback, quarterback

Coaching career (HC unless noted)

Football
- 1945–1951: Norfolk State
- 1952–?: Booker T. Washington HS (VA) (assistant)

Basketball
- 1945–1952: Norfolk State

Administrative career (AD unless noted)
- c. 1962–?: Booker T. Washington HS (VA)

Head coaching record
- Overall: 30–17–4 (football)

Accomplishments and honors

Championships
- Football; 2 EIAC (1949–1950)

Leroy Porter (c. 1920 – ?) was an American football and basketball coach, athletics administrator, and educator. He served as the head football coach at Norfolk State College—now known as Norfolk State University—in Norfolk, Virginia, from 1945 to 1951, compiling a record of 30–17–4.

A native of Coatesville, Pennsylvania, Porter graduated from West Chester High School before attending Virginia State College for Negroes—now known as Virginia State University—where he played football as a fullback, and earned All-Colored Intercollegiate Athletic Association (CIAA) honors in 1944. He was appointed head football coach and director of physical education in Norfolk State in 1945. Porter also coached basketball at Norfolk. In 1952, he joined the football coaching staff at Booker T. Washington High School in Norfolk. Porter later served as athletic director and assistant principal at Booker T. Washington High. He retired from the school in 1984.

Porter married Celestyne Diggs in 1948.

== Head coaching record ==
=== Football ===
| Year | Team | Overall | Conference | Standing | Bowl/playoffs |
|---|---|---|---|---|---|
Norfolk State Baby Trojans (Eastern Intercollegiate Athletic Conference) (1945–1951)
| 1945 | Norfolk State | 3–2–1 | | | |
| 1946 | Norfolk State | 4–5 | | | |
| 1947 | Norfolk State | 5–2 | | | |
| 1948 | Norfolk State | 5–3–1 | 3–1–1 | 3rd | |
| 1949 | Norfolk State | 6–0 | 5–0 | 1st | |
| 1950 | Norfolk State | 5–2–1 | 4–0–1 | 2nd (Note: Norfolk State finished second to Morristown in the Eastern Intercollegiate Athletic Conference (EIAC) standings, but Morristown did not play enough conference games to be eligible for the championship, so Norfolk State was awarded the conference title.) | |
| 1951 | Norfolk State | 2–3–1 | | | |
| Norfolk State: | | 30–17–4 | | | |
| Total: | | 30–17–4 | | | |
National championship Conference title Conference division title or championship game berth
