= Norfolk Tides =

Minor League Baseball team

- Founded in 1961; Norfolk, Virginia
Team logo
Cap insignia

Minor league affiliations
- Class: Triple-A (1969–present)
- Previous classes: Class A (1961–1968)
- League: International League (1969–present)
- Division: East Division
- Previous leagues: Carolina League (1963–1968); South Atlantic League (1961–1962)

Major league affiliations
- Team: Baltimore Orioles (2007–present)
- Previous teams: New York Mets (1969–2006); Philadelphia Phillies (1966–1968); Chicago White Sox (1964–1965); Unaffiliated (1963); St. Louis Cardinals (1962); Kansas City A's (1961)

Minor league titles
- Class titles (2): 1983; 2023
- League titles (7): 1965; 1972; 1975; 1982; 1983; 1985; 2023
- Division titles (5): 1988; 1995; 2001; 2005; 2015
- First-half titles (1): 2023

Team data
- Name: Norfolk Tides (1993–present)
- Previous names: Tidewater Tides (1963–1992); Portsmouth-Norfolk Tides (1961–1962)
- Colors: Tidal green, black, Orioles orange, battleship gray, sea foam, white
- Mascots: Rip Tide and Triton
- Ballpark: Harbor Park (1993–present)
- Previous parks: Met Park (1970–1992); Frank D. Lawrence Stadium (1961–1969); High Rock Park (1961–1962)
- Owner/ Operator: Diamond Baseball Holdings
- President: Joe Gregory
- General manager: Mike Zeman
- Manager: Tim Federowicz
- Website: milb.com/norfolk

The Norfolk Tides are a Minor League Baseball team of the International League and the Triple-A affiliate of the Baltimore Orioles. They are located in Norfolk, Virginia, and are named in nautical reference to the city's location on the Chesapeake Bay. The team plays their home games at Harbor Park, which opened in 1993. The Tides previously played at High Rock Park in 1961 and 1962, Frank D. Lawrence Stadium from 1961 to 1969, and at Met Park from its opening in 1970 until the end of the 1992 season.

Originally known as the Portsmouth-Norfolk Tides, the team began play in 1961 as members of the Class A South Atlantic League. In 1963, they joined the Class A Carolina League and became known as the Tidewater Tides, taking their geographic identifier from the Tidewater region. The Tides were replaced by a Triple-A International League team in 1969. The Triple-A Tides carried on the history of the Class A team that preceded them. The club rebranded as the Norfolk Tides in 1993. In conjunction with Major League Baseball's reorganization of Minor League Baseball in 2021, the Tides were placed in the Triple-A East, which was renamed the International League in 2022.

The team has won seven league championships in its history. They won the Carolina League championship in 1965 as the Class A affiliate of the Chicago White Sox. During their 38-year Triple-A affiliation with the New York Mets from 1969 to 2006, they won the Governors' Cup, the championship of the International League, on five occasions (1972, 1975, 1982, 1983, and 1985) and won the Triple-A World Series in 1983. As an affiliate of the Baltimore Orioles, they won another International League championship and the Triple-A championship in 2023.

== History ==
=== Before the Tides ===
Both Norfolk and Portsmouth, Virginia, first hosted professional baseball teams in the late 19th century. Among the clubs to hail from these neighboring cities were the Norfolk Tars, which played on and off from 1906 to 1955 primarily in the Virginia League and Piedmont League; the Portsmouth Truckers, which played at intervals from 1895 to 1935 mostly in the Virginia League; the Portsmouth Cubs of the Piedmont League from 1936 to 1952; and the Portsmouth Merrimacs also of the Piedmont League from 1953 to 1955. The Tars folded in July 1955 due to low attendance and steep financial losses. Fiscal problems also caused the Merrimacs to cease operations after the 1955 campaign.

=== South Atlantic League (1961–1962) ===
Six years after the loss of the Tars and Merrimacs, the Portsmouth-Norfolk Tides were established as members of the Class A South Atlantic League. They played some home games at Frank D. Lawrence Stadium in Portsmouth and some at High Rock Park in Norfolk. The Tides had a limited affiliation with Major League Baseball's Kansas City Athletics. Their inaugural season opener was a 7–4 victory in Portsmouth over the Charlotte Hornets with 3,158 people in attendance on April 17, 1961. In 1962, they became an affiliate of the St. Louis Cardinals. The Tides dropped out of the Sally League after losing their working agreement with St. Louis and following what Tides general manager Marshall Fox called "unfair treatment" by the league.

=== Carolina League (1963–1968) ===
The Carolina League, a Class A circuit, accepted the Tides as members for 1963. At this point, the team became known as the Tidewater Tides, taking their geographic identifier from the Tidewater region, and began playing their home games exclusively at Lawrence Stadium in Portsmouth. They were not affiliated with any Major League Baseball team in their first Carolina League season.

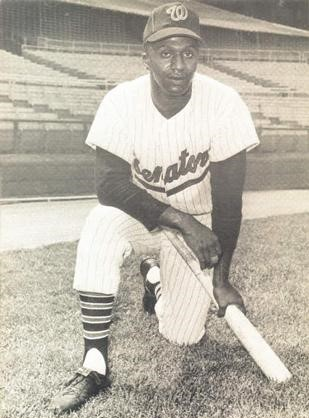
Ed Stroud won the 1964 Carolina League MVP Award.

The Tides became the Class A affiliate of the Chicago White Sox in 1964. Under manager Allen Jones, they qualified for the playoffs that year for the first time in team history and defeated the Kinston Eagles in the semifinals to advance to the championship round where they lost to the Winston-Salem Red Sox. Outfielder Ed Stroud won the league's Most Valuable Player (MVP) Award. Jones led the team back to the postseason in 1965. After defeating the Peninsula Grays in the semifinals, the Tides won the Carolina League championship by sweeping the Durham Bulls, 2–0.

Tidewater became an affiliate of the Philadelphia Phillies in 1966. They made the postseason in 1967 and 1968, but they were defeated in the finals by Durham in 1967 and eliminated in the quarterfinals by the Raleigh-Durham Mets in 1968.

=== International League ===
==== New York Mets (1969–2006) ====
In 1969, the New York Mets moved their Triple-A International League (IL) affiliate, the Jacksonville Suns, from Jacksonville, Florida, to Portsmouth as the Tidewater Tides. The team was operated by Tidewater Professional Sports and owned by the Mets. The Triple-A Tides carried on the history of the Class A team that preceded them.

International League Manager of the Year Clyde McCullough led the team to a league-best 76–59 record in their first Triple-A season, but they were eliminated in the semifinals of the Governors' Cup playoffs to determine the IL championship. The 1969 season was the team's last at Lawrence Stadium. They moved into the new Met Park, located in Norfolk, in 1970. After another semifinal exit that year, the Tides reached the finals in 1971 but lost the championship to the Rochester Red Wings in the full five-game series. Hank Bauer, manager of the 1972 club, led the Tides to win their first Governors' Cup with a 3–2 series defeat of the Louisville Colonels in the finals. Following this win, Tidewater competed in the Kodak World Baseball Classic, a five-team round-robin tournament that included the champions of the American Association (the Evansville Triplets) and Pacific Coast League (the Albuquerque Dukes), the Caribbean All-Stars, and the hosting Hawaii Islanders. The Tides went 3–2 but were eliminated. Bauer was selected as the 1972 IL Manager of the Year. The club returned to the playoffs in 1973 but could not advance past the semifinals.

Tidewater finished atop the league standings in 1974 with an 86–55 record under manager Joe Frazier. After sweeping the Charleston Charlies, 3–0, in the semis, they won the IL championship over the Syracuse Chiefs, 3–1. Afterwards, they met the Evansville Triplets, champions of the American Association, in the Junior World Series, which the Tides lost, 4–1. The Tides swept the 1975 International League year-end awards with outfielder Mike Vail as the IL MVP and Rookie of the Year, Craig Swan as the Most Valuable Pitcher, and Frazier as Manager of the Year.

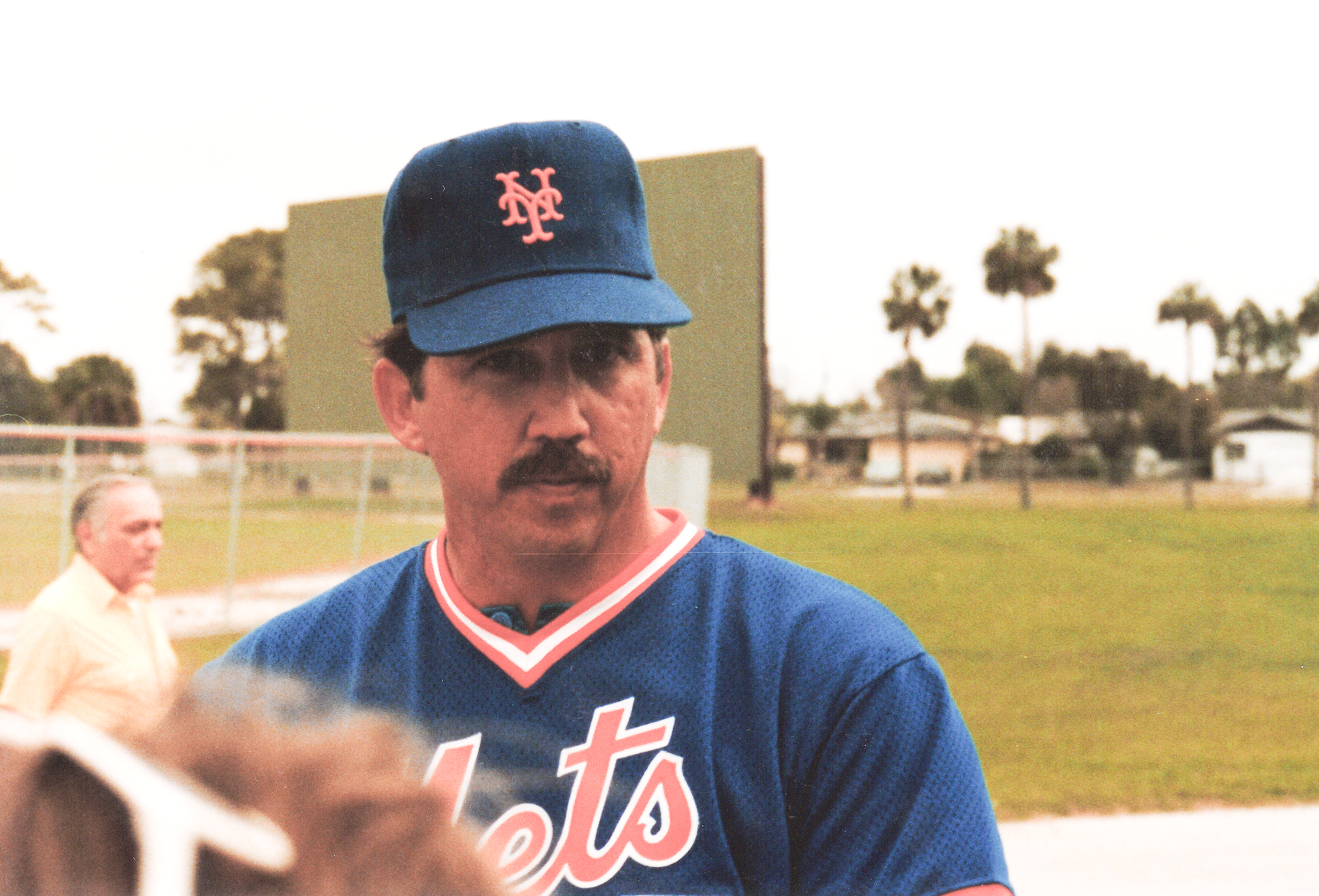
Davey Johnson led the Tides to win the 1983 IL championship and the Triple-A World Series.

They next appeared in the postseason in 1977, 1979, and 1981, but they were unable to move on past the semifinals. During this stretch, Juan Berenguer won the 1978 Most Valuable Pitcher Award, and outfielder Mookie Wilson won the 1979 Rookie of the Year Award. Tidewater won back-to-back Governors' Cups in 1982 and 1983. Jack Aker's 1982 club swept the Columbus Clippers, 3–0, in the semifinals and did the same against Rochester in the finals. Under Davey Johnson in 1983, the Tides dispatched Columbus in the semis, and then won a second consecutive IL title over the Richmond Braves. That postseason, the Tides, the American Association champion Denver Bears, and Pacific Coast League champion Portland Beavers contested the Triple-A World Series, a round-robin tournament to crown an overall champion of the classification. Tidewater won the series, 3–1. Walt Terrell was the IL's Most Valuable Pitcher for 1973.

In 1985, Bob Schaefer led the team to its sixth and final Governors' Cup championship with a semifinal victory over the Maine Guides and a finals win over Columbus. Though the Tides would remain members of the International League for the next 35 years, they were unable to win another league crown. They lost in the semifinals in 1986 and suffered defeats in the finals of both 1987 and 1988. John Mitchell was selected as the IL Most Valuable Pitcher for 1986. First baseman Randy Milligan won both the 1987 MVP and Rookie of the Year Awards. Third basemen Tom O'Malley (1989) and Jeff Manto (1994) later won IL MVP Awards.

The club went through a season of change from 1992 to 1993. First, in December 1992, the Mets sold the franchise to a group led by Tampa businessman Ken Young. The Triple-A affiliation between the teams remained intact. In 1993, the Tides left Met Park and moved into the new US$16-million Harbor Park. As they moved into the new facility, the team also replaced the "Tidewater" in its name with that of Norfolk. Also in 1993, the Tides introduced their mascot, Rip Tide. The franchise was awarded the 1993 John H. Johnson President's Award, recognizing them as the "complete baseball franchise—based on franchise stability, contributions to league stability, contributions to baseball in the community, and promotion of the baseball industry."

The 1995 Tides led the league with their 86–56 record but were eliminated in the Governors' Cup finals by the Ottawa Lynx. They did, however, win all four IL year-end awards: MVP (third baseman/outfielder Butch Huskey, Most Valuable Pitcher and Rookie of the Year (Jason Isringhausen, and Manager of the Year (Toby Harrah). Norfolk made three more playoff appearances as a Mets affiliate, exiting in the semifinal rounds of 1996, 2001, and 2005. Mike Fyhrie won the 1996 Most Valuable Pitcher Award, and first baseman Roberto Petagine was the 1997 IL MVP. The 38-year Triple-A affiliation with New York ended after the 2006 season when the Mets elected to affiliate with the New Orleans Zephyrs for 2007.

==== Baltimore Orioles (2007–2020) ====
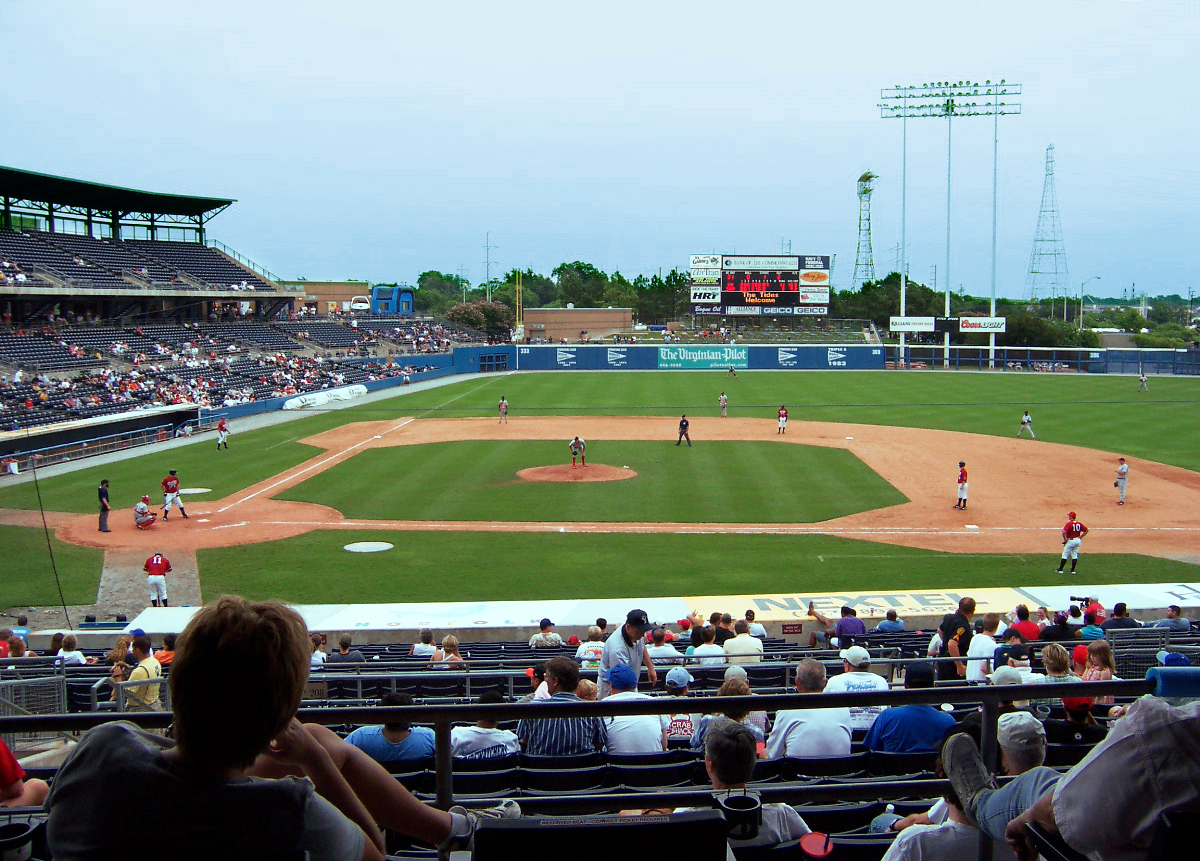
The Tides have played at Harbor Park since 1993.

Norfolk became the Triple-A affiliate of the Baltimore Orioles in 2007. The Orioles preferred the quality of the facilities at Harbor Park as well as the more favorable weather and proximity of Norfolk compared to their previous location in Ottawa. Maryland Baseball Holding, the Tides' ownership group led by Ken Young, also owned two other Orioles-affiliated teams at the time: the Bowie Baysox and Frederick Keys.

From 2007 to 2014, the Tides regularly finished with losing records and only finished at or above .500 in 2009, 2012, and 2013. The 2015 team, led by IL Manager of the Year Ron Johnson qualified for the Governors' Cup playoffs as winners of the Southern Division title but lost in the semifinals to Columbus in five games. The Tides added a second mascot, a green sea creature named Triton, in 2016. Norfolk continued to post losing seasons from 2016 to 2019. In 2019, first baseman Ryan Mountcastle was selected as the IL MVP. The start of the 2020 season was initially postponed due to the COVID-19 pandemic before being cancelled altogether.

=== Triple-A East / International League ===
==== Baltimore Orioles (2021–present) ====
Following the 2020 season, Major League Baseball assumed control of Minor League Baseball in a move to increase player salaries, modernize facility standards, and reduce travel. The Tides were organized into the Triple-A East and maintained their affiliation with the Baltimore Orioles. Norfolk ended the season in sixth place in the Southeastern Division with a 48–72 record. No playoffs were held to determine a league champion; instead, the team with the best regular-season record was declared the winner. However, 10 games that had been postponed from the start of the season were reinserted into the schedule as a postseason tournament called the Triple-A Final Stretch in which all 30 Triple-A clubs competed for the highest winning percentage. Norfolk finished the tournament tied for 20th place with a 4–6 record. In 2022, the Triple-A East became known as the International League, the name historically used by the regional circuit prior to the 2021 reorganization. Shortstop Gunnar Henderson won the 2022 International League Top MLB Prospect Award.

On April 8, 2023, the Tides set the franchise record as an Orioles affiliate for the most runs scored in a game in a 21–2 victory over the Gwinnett Stripers. In addition, Norfolk tied the franchise record for runs scored in an inning after 11 crossed the plate in the 6th inning. The Tides won the first-half of the 2023 season, clinching a berth in the championship playoffs at the conclusion of the season. In the best-of-three series, the Tides defeated the Durham Bulls to win the International League championship. They won the Triple-A National Championship Game versus the Oklahoma City Dodgers, champions of the Pacific Coast League, 7–6. Buck Britton won the 2023 IL Manager of the Year Award.

The franchise was purchased by Diamond Baseball Holdings on October 17, 2023. In 2024, third baseman Coby Mayo won the IL Top MLB Prospect Award. In 2025, Dylan Beavers was selected as the IL MVP.

== Season-by-season records ==
Table key
League	The team's final position in the league standings
Division	The team's final position in the divisional standings
GB	Games behind the team that finished in first place in the division that season
‡	Class champions (1970–present)
†	League champions (1961–present)
*	Division champions (1963–2022)
^	Postseason berth (1962–present)

Season-by-season records
Season	League	Regular-season					Postseason			MLB affiliate	Ref.
Season	League	Record	Win %	League	Division	GB	Record	Win %	Result	MLB affiliate	Ref.
1961	SAL	66–72	.478	6th	—	21 1/2	—	—	Result	—	Kansas City Athletics
1962	SAL	55–85	.393	7th	—	37 1/2	—	—	—	St. Louis Cardinals	
1963	CL	65–79	.451	8th	4th	12 1/2	—	—	—	Unaffiliated	
1964^	CL	75–63	.543	5th	2nd	4	2–2	.500	Won semifinals vs. Kinston Eagles, 2–0; Lost CL championship vs. Winston-Salem Red Sox, 2–0	Chicago White Sox	
1965^ †	CL	76–68	.528	4th	2nd	10	4–1	.800	Won semifinals vs. Peninsula Grays, 2–1; Won CL championship vs. Durham Bulls, 2–0	Chicago White Sox	
1966	CL	58–81	.417	11th	5th	18	—	—	—	Philadelphia Phillies	
1967^	CL	70–68	.507	5th	4th	5	4–2	.667	Won quarterfinals vs. Peninsula Grays, 1–0; Won semifinals vs. Raleigh Pirates, 2–0; Lost CL championship vs. Durham Bulls, 2–1	Philadelphia Phillies	
1968^	CL	80–60	.571	3rd	2nd	3 1/2	0–1	.000	Lost quarterfinals vs. Raleigh-Durham Mets, 1–0	Philadelphia Phillies	
1969^	IL	76–59	.563	1st	—	3 1/2	1–3	.250	Lost semifinals vs. Columbus Jets, 3–1	New York Mets	
1970^	IL	74–66	.529	4th	—	10	0–3	.000	Lost semifinals vs. Syracuse Chiefs, 3–0	New York Mets	
1971^	IL	79–61	.564	2nd	—	7	5–3	.625	Won semifinals vs. Charleston Charlies, 3–0; Lost IL championship vs. Rochester Red Wings, 3–2	New York Mets	
1972^ †	IL	78–65	.545	3rd	—	2 1/2	8–5	.615	Won semifinals vs. Charleston Charlies, 2–1; Won IL championship vs. Louisville Colonels, 3–2; Lost Kodak World Baseball Championship, 3–2	New York Mets	
1973^	IL	75–70	.517	5th	2nd	10	2–3	.400	Lost semifinals vs. Pawtucket Red Sox, 3–2	New York Mets	
1974	IL	57–82	.410	7th	4th	28 1/2	—	—	—	New York Mets	
1975^ †	IL	86–55	.610	1st	—	—	7–5	.583	Won semifinals vs. Charleston Charlies, 3–0; Won IL championship vs. Syracuse Chiefs, 3–1; Lost Junior World Series vs. Evansville Triplets, 4–1	New York Mets	
1976	IL	60–78	.435	7th	—	28	—	—	—	New York Mets	
1977^	IL	73–67	.521	3rd	—	7	1–3	.250	Lost semifinals vs. Charleston Charlies, 3–1	New York Mets	
1978	IL	69–71	.493	5th	—	16	—	—	—	New York Mets	
1979^	IL	73–67	.521	4th	—	12 1/2	1–3	.250	Lost semifinals vs. Columbus Clippers, 3–1	New York Mets	
1980	IL	67–72	.482	6th	—	15 1/2	—	—	—	New York Mets	
1981^	IL	70–68	.507	3rd	—	17 1/2	2–3	.400	Lost semifinals vs. Richmond Braves, 3–2	New York Mets	
1982^ †	IL	74–63	.540	3rd	—	7	6–0	1.000	Won semifinals vs. Columbus Clippers, 3–0; Won IL championship vs. Rochester Red Wings, 3–0	New York Mets	
1983^ † ‡	IL	71–68	.511	4th	—	11 1/2	9–4	.692	Won semifinals vs. Columbus Clippers, 3–2; Won IL championship vs. Richmond Braves, 3–1; Won Triple-A World Series vs. Portland Beavers and Denver Bears, 3–1	New York Mets	
1984	IL	71–69	.507	5th	—	11 1/2	—	—	—	New York Mets	
1985^ †	IL	75–64	.540	3rd (tie)	—	3 1/2	6–3	.667	Won semifinals vs. Maine Guides, 3–2; Won IL championship vs. Columbus Clippers, 3–1	New York Mets	
1986^	IL	74–66	.529	4th	—	6	0–3	.000	Lost semifinals vs. Richmond Braves, 3–0	New York Mets	
1987^	IL	81–59	.579	1st	—	—	3–4	.429	Won semifinals vs. Pawtucket Red Sox, 3–1; Lost IL championship vs. Columbus Clippers, 3–0	New York Mets	
1988 *	IL	77–64	.546	1st (tie)	1st	—	1–3	.250	Won Eastern Division title Lost IL championship vs. Rochester Red Wings, 3–1	New York Mets	
1989	IL	77–69	.527	3rd (tie)	2nd (tie)	4	—	—	—	New York Mets	
1990	IL	79–67	.541	3rd	2nd	8	—	—	—	New York Mets	
1991	IL	77–65	.542	3rd	2nd	7	—	—	—	New York Mets	
1992	IL	56–86	.394	8th	4th	38	—	—	—	New York Mets	
1993	IL	70–71	.496	6th	4th	16	—	—	—	New York Mets	
1994	IL	67–75	.472	8th	4th	13 1/2	—	—	—	New York Mets	
1995 *	IL	86–56	.606	1st	1st	—	4–5	.444	Won Western Division title Won semifinals vs. Richmond Braves, 3–2; Lost IL championship vs. Ottawa Lynx, 3–1	New York Mets	
1996^	IL	82–59	.582	2nd	2nd	2 1/2	0–3	.000	Lost semifinals vs. Columbus Clippers, 3–0	New York Mets	
1997	IL	75–67	.528	5th	3rd	4	—	—	—	New York Mets	
1998	IL	70–72	.493	7th	2nd	9	—	—	—	New York Mets	
1999	IL	77–63	.550	4th	3rd	4 1/2	—	—	—	New York Mets	
2000	IL	65–79	.451	10th (tie)	3rd	16 1/2	—	—	—	New York Mets	
2001 *	IL	85–57	.599	2nd	1st	—	2–3	.400	Won Southern Division title Lost semifinals vs. Louisville RiverBats, 3–2	New York Mets	
2002	IL	70–73	.490	8th	3rd	9 1/2	—	—	—	New York Mets	
2003	IL	67–76	.469	10th	3rd	7 1/2	—	—	—	New York Mets	
2004	IL	72–72	.500	7th	3rd	8 1/2	—	—	—	New York Mets	
2005 *	IL	79–65	.549	3rd	1st	—	2–3	.400	Won Southern Division title Lost semifinals vs. Toledo Mud Hens, 3–2	New York Mets	
2006	IL	57–84	.404	13th	3rd	22	—	—	—	New York Mets	
2007	IL	69–74	.483	9th	3rd	11	—	—	—	Baltimore Orioles	
2008	IL	64–78	.451	11th	2nd	9	—	—	—	Baltimore Orioles	
2009	IL	71–71	.500	7th	3rd	11	—	—	—	Baltimore Orioles	
2010	IL	67–77	.465	10th (tie)	3rd (tie)	21 1/2	—	—	—	Baltimore Orioles	
2011	IL	56–87	.392	13th	4th	24 1/2	—	—	—	Baltimore Orioles	
2012	IL	74–70	.514	7th	2nd	9	—	—	—	Baltimore Orioles	
2013	IL	77–67	.535	4th (tie)	2nd	10	—	—	—	Baltimore Orioles	
2014	IL	65–79	.451	13th	3rd	10	—	—	—	Baltimore Orioles	
2015 *	IL	78–66	.542	4th	1st	—	2–3	.400	Won Southern Division title Lost semifinals vs. Columbus Clippers, 3–2	Baltimore Orioles	
2016	IL	62–82	.431	13th	4th	3 1/2	—	—	—	Baltimore Orioles	
2017	IL	66–76	.465	10th	3rd	20	—	—	—	Baltimore Orioles	
2018	IL	69–71	.493	8th	3rd	10 1/2	—	—	—	Baltimore Orioles	
2019	IL	69–79	.432	12th	4th	20	—	—	—	Baltimore Orioles	
2020	IL	Season cancelled (COVID-19 pandemic)								Baltimore Orioles	
2021	AAAE	52–78 (Note: In 2021, the team with the best record at the end of the regular-season was declared the Triple-A East champion. Norfolk had a 48–72 (.475) record, 29 games behind first place, which put them 19th in the league and 6th in their division. The regular-season was followed by the Triple-A Final Stretch, a 10-game postseason tournament in which all 30 Triple-A clubs competed for the highest winning percentage. Norfolk finished the tournament tied for 20th place with a 3–6 (.400) record.)	.400	16th (tie)	6th	34	—	—	—	Baltimore Orioles	
2022	IL	74–76	.493	12th	7th	12	—	—	—	Baltimore Orioles	
2023^ † ‡	IL	90–59	.604	1st	1st	—	3–1	.750	Won first-half title Won IL championship vs. Durham Bulls, 2–1; Won Triple-A championship vs. Oklahoma City Dodgers, 1–0	Baltimore Orioles	
2024	IL	69–81	.460	17th	9th	20 1/2	—	—	—	Baltimore Orioles	
2025	IL	63–84	.429	15th	8th	24 1/2	—	—	—	Baltimore Orioles	
2026	IL	58–89	.395	20th	10th	31 1/2	—	—	—	Baltimore Orioles	
Totals	—	4,609–4,610	.500	—	—	—	75–72	.510	—	—	—

== Radio and television ==
All Tides home and road games are broadcast on ESPN 94.1 WVSP-FM. Live audio broadcasts are also available online through the station's website as well as on the team's website and the MiLB First Pitch app. Games can be viewed through the MiLB.TV subscription feature of the official website of Minor League Baseball, with audio provided by a radio simulcast.

As of 2021, Pete Michaud is the play-by-play announcer. Several former Tides broadcasters have gone on to work in Major League Baseball or other major league sports, including: Ford C. Frick Award winner Marty Brennaman (1970–1973), Pete Van Wieren (1974–1975), Larry Matson (1976), Bob Rathbun (1980–1985, 1990), Charlie Slowes (1986, 1991–1992), Ken Levine (1989–1990), and Bob Socci (2006–2011).

== Roster ==
Norfolk Tides roster
Players	Coaches/Other
Pitchers: 29 Trace Bright; 43 Jake Dykhoff; 41 Dietrich Enns; 48 José Espada; 36 Michael Forret; 33 Cameron Foster *; 59 Nestor German; 66 Christian Herberholz; 23 Codi Heuer *; 39 Yaramil Hiraldo *; 25 Ryan Long; 21 Andrew Magno; 47 Gerald Ogando; 26 Alex Pham; 38 Cade Povich *; 56 Yaqui Rivera; 10 Juaron Watts-Brown; 33 Yosver Zulueta *; Catchers: 28 Ethan Anderson; 4 Silas Ardoin; 35 Sam Huff; 12 Creed Willems; Infielders: 31 Brandon Butterworth; 5 Payton Eeles; 53 Aron Estrada; 24 Ryan Noda; 15 Bryan Ramos; 9 Luis Vázquez; Outfielders: 1 Enrique Bradfield; 3 Jud Fabian; 13 Tavian Josenberger; 17 Fernando Peguero; 18 Reed Trimble *	Manager: 19 Tim Federowicz; Coaches: 22 Felipe Alou Jr. (fundamentals); 46 Billy Facteau (development); 10 Rick Strickland (hitting); 52 Jeff Ware (pitching); 60-day injured list: 36 Jackson Kowar (full season); -- Elvis Peguero (full season); 51 Jayvien Sandridge; 34 Levi Wells; 7-day injured list; * On Baltimore Orioles 40-man roster; ~ Development list; # Rehab assignment; ∞ Reserve list; ‡ Restricted list; § Suspended list; † Temporarily inactive list; Roster updated September 25, 2026; Transactions; → More rosters: MiLB • International League; → Baltimore Orioles minor league players

== Awards ==
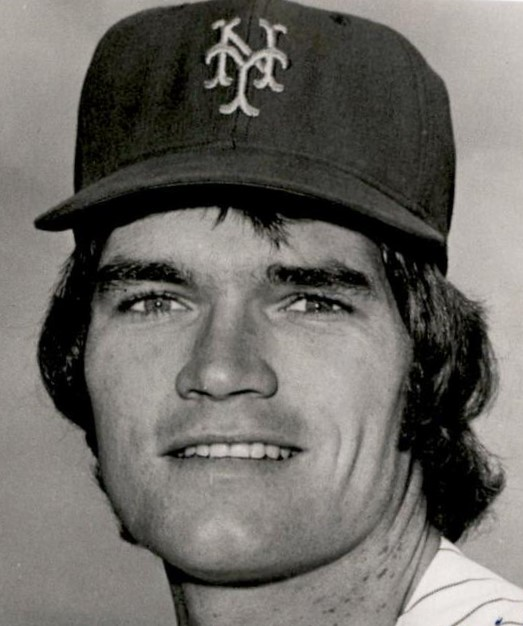
Mike Vail, 1975 IL MVP and Rookie of the Year

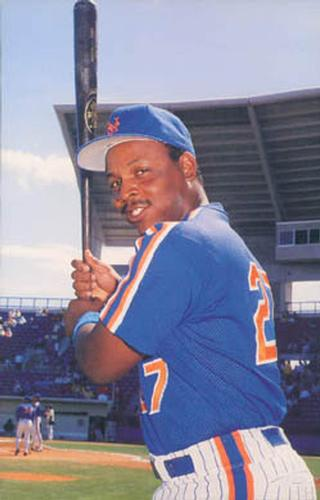
Randy Milligan, 1987 IL MVP and Rookie of the Year

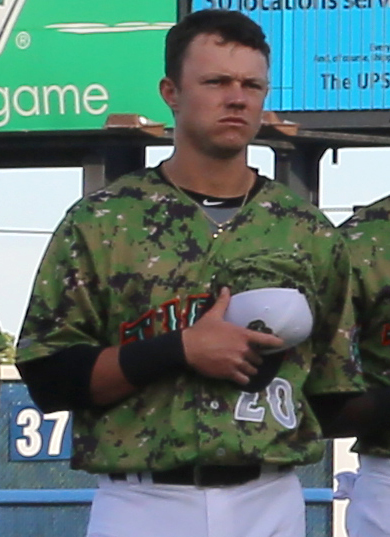
Ryan Mountcastle, 2019 IL MVP

The franchise has been awarded these honors by Minor League Baseball.

Minor League Baseball Awards
Award	Season	Ref.
John H. Johnson President's Award	1993	
Charles K. Murphy Patriot Award	2018	

One player won a league award in recognition for their performance with Tidewater in the Carolina League.

Carolina League Awards
Award	Recipient	Season	Ref.
Most Valuable Player	Ed Stroud	1964	

Seventeen players, six managers, and two executives have won league awards in recognition for their performance with Tidewater/Norfolk in the International League.

International League Awards
Award	Recipient	Season	Ref.
Most Valuable Player	Mike Vail	1975	
Most Valuable Player	Randy Milligan	1987	
Most Valuable Player	Tom O'Malley	1989	
Most Valuable Player	Jeff Manto	1994	
Most Valuable Player	Butch Huskey	1995	
Most Valuable Player	Roberto Petagine	1997	
Most Valuable Player	Ryan Mountcastle	2019	
Most Valuable Player	Dylan Beavers	2025	
Most Valuable Pitcher	Craig Swan	1975	
Most Valuable Pitcher	Juan Berenguer	1978	
Most Valuable Pitcher	Walt Terrell	1983	
Most Valuable Pitcher	John Mitchell	1986	
Most Valuable Pitcher	Jason Isringhausen	1995	
Most Valuable Pitcher	Mike Fyhrie	1996	
Rookie of the Year	Mike Vail	1975	
Rookie of the Year	Mookie Wilson	1979	
Rookie of the Year	Randy Milligan	1987	
Rookie of the Year	Jason Isringhausen	1995	
Top MLB Prospect Award	Gunnar Henderson	2022	
Top MLB Prospect Award	Coby Mayo	2024	
Manager of the Year	Clyde McCullough	1969	
Manager of the Year	Hank Bauer	1972	
Manager of the Year	Joe Frazier	1975	
Manager of the Year	Toby Harrah	1995	
Manager of the Year	Ron Johnson	2015	
Manager of the Year	Buck Britton	2023	
Executive of the Year	Dave Rosenfield	1975	
Executive of the Year	Dave Rosenfield	1982	
Executive of the Year	Dave Rosenfield	1987	
Executive of the Year	Dave Rosenfield	1993	
Spirit of the International League	Kenny Magner	2019	

== Managers ==
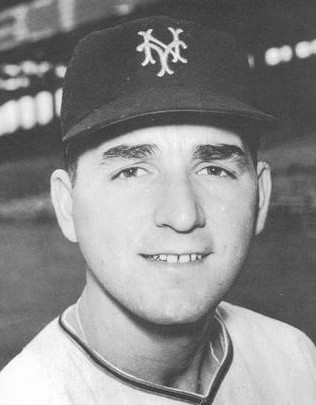
Johnny Antonelli managed the Tides from 1973 to 1974.

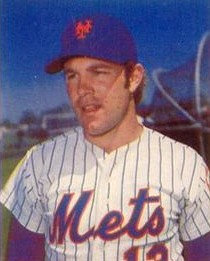
John Stearns managed the Tides in 2004.

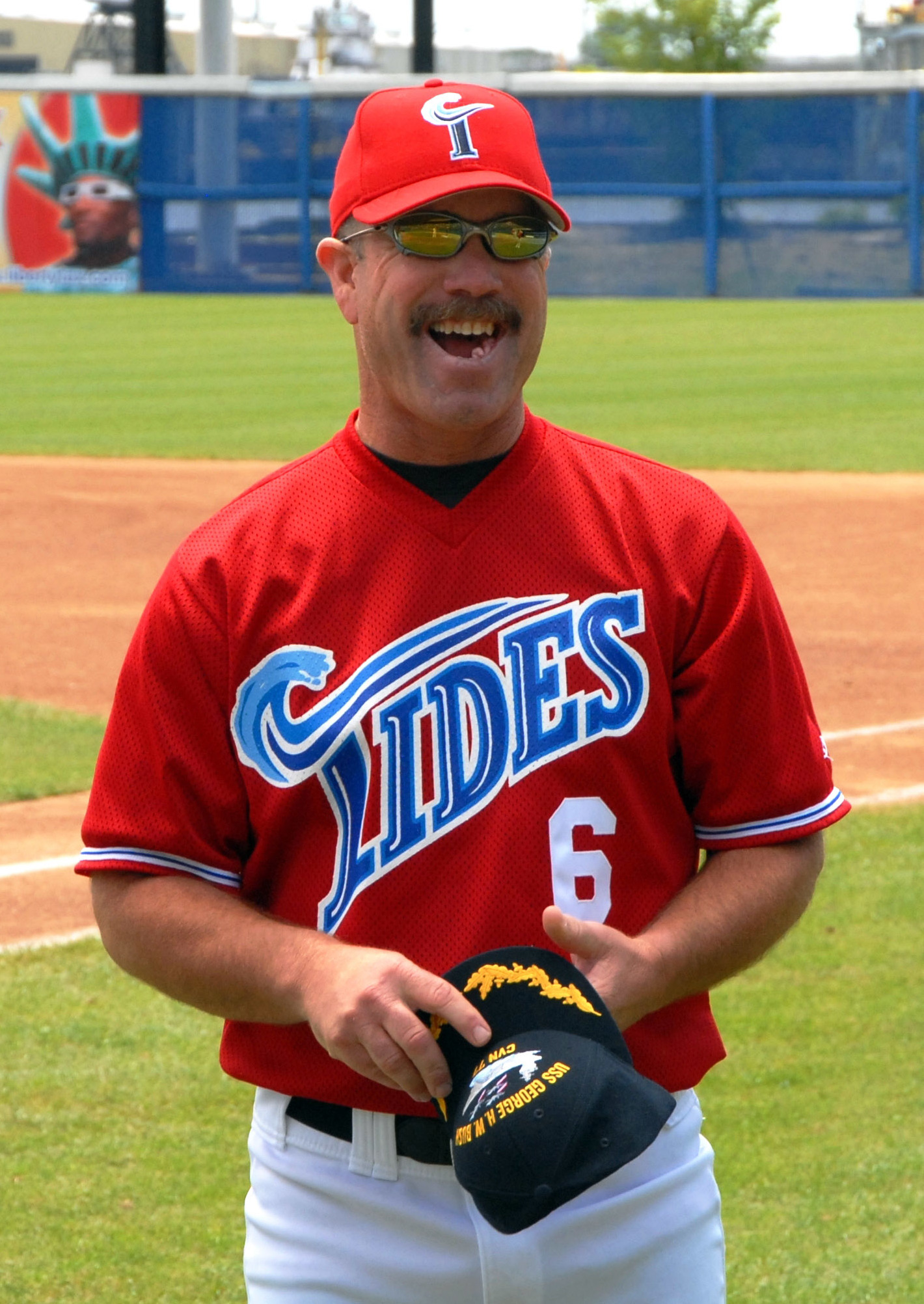
Gary Allenson managed the Tides from 2007 to 2010 and in 2011.

Norfolk has had 33 managers since their inaugural 1961 season.

No.	Manager	Season(s)
1	Granny Hamner	1961
2	Chase Riddle	1962
3	Allen Jones	1963–1965
4	Bobby Morgan (Note: Bobby Morgan was fired on July 23, 1966, and Lou Kahn was appointed manager on July 24.)	1966
5	Lou Kahn	1966
6	Bob Wellman	1967–1968
7	Clyde McCullough	1969
8	Chuck Hiller	1970
9	Hank Bauer	1971–1972
10	Johnny Antonelli	1973–1974
11	Joe Frazier	1975
12	Tom Burgess	1976
13	Frank Verdi	1977–1980
14	Jack Aker	1981–1982
15	Davey Johnson	1983
16	Bob Schaefer	1984–1985
17	Sam Perlozzo	1986
18	Mike Cubbage	1987–1989
19	Steve Swisher	1990–1991
20	Clint Hurdle	1992–1993
21	Bobby Valentine	1994
22	Toby Harrah	1995
—	Bobby Valentine (Note: Bobby Valentine was promoted to manager of the New York Mets on August 26, 1996, and third base coach Bruce Benedict was appointed manager of the Tides.)	1996
23	Bruce Benedict	1996
24	Rick Dempsey	1997–1998
25	John Gibbons	1999–2001
26	Bobby Floyd	2002–2003
27	John Stearns	2004
28	Ken Oberkfell	2005–2006
29	Gary Allenson (Note: Gary Allenson was promoted to third base coach of the Baltimore Orioles on June 4, 2010, and Bobby Dickerson, Baltimore's minor league and Latin America field coordinator, was appointed interim manager.)	2007–2010
30	Bobby Dickerson	2010
—	Gary Allenson	2011
31	Ron Johnson	2012–2018
32	Gary Kendall	2019–2021
33	Buck Britton	2022-2024
34	Tim Federowicz	2025-2026
