= List of interleague minor league postseason series =

Since the 1902 foundation of the National Association of Professional Baseball Leagues, commonly known as Minor League Baseball, various leagues have held interleague series in the postseason between their champions or other qualifiers.

Series	Leagues	Years
New England Championship	Connecticut League, New England League	1903, 1905–1906
Little World Series	American Association, International League	1904, 1906–1907, 1917, 1920–1931
Iowa State Series	Iowa State League, Three-I League, Western League	1905
Dixie Championship	South Atlantic League, Virginia League	1906
Midwest Championship	Iowa State League, Wisconsin State League	1907
Carolina Championship	Carolina Association, Eastern Carolina League	1909
Dixie Championship	South Atlantic League, Southern Association	1909, 1919
New York versus Pennsylvania Series	New York State League, Tri-State League	1909
Kansas versus Nebraska Series	Eastern Kansas League, M.I.N.K. League	1910
Northern Championship	Minnesota–Wisconsin League, Wisconsin–Illinois League	1910
Carolina versus Virginia Series	Carolina Association, Virginia League	1911
Class D Series	Blue Grass League, Kentucky–Illinois–Tennessee League	1912
Western Championship	American Association, Western League	1912
Virginia Series	Appalachian League, Virginia League	1912
Class B Championship Series	Eastern Association, New England League	1913, 1914
Michigan State Championship	Michigan State League, Southern Michigan Association	1913
Minor League Championship	American Association, Western League	1913, 1916
Minor League Championship	American Association, Southern Association, Western League	1914
Virginia-North Carolina Series	North Carolina State League, Virginia League	1914–1915
Junior World Series	American Association, Pacific Coast League	1919
Dixie Series	Southern Association, Texas League	1920–1958
Border Series	Texas–Oklahoma League, Western Association	1921
Class B Championship Series	Central League, Michigan–Ontario League	1921
Class D Series	Southwestern League, Western Association	1921
Little World Series Tune-up	Eastern League, International League	1922–1925
Class A Series	Western League, Southern Association	1922
Class B Southern Championship	South Atlantic League, Virginia League	1922–1923
Five-State Championship	Blue Ridge League, Eastern Shore League	1922–1927
Lone Star Series	East Texas League, Texas Association	1924, 1926
Class AA Series	American Association, Pacific Coast League	1924
San Francisco-Louisville Series	American Association, Pacific Coast League	1925
Southern Championship	South Atlantic League, Virginia League	1925–1927
Northern Championship	Three-I League, Michigan State League	1926
Mid-Western Championship	Three-I League, Western League	1926
Eastern Championship	New York–Penn League, New England League	1926
Eastern Championship	New York–Penn League, Eastern League	1926, 1930
Class B Championship	New York–Penn League, Virginia League	1927
Eastern Championship	Eastern League, International League	1927, 1929
Southern Championship	Southeastern League, South Atlantic League	1927–1928, 1930
Texas Class D Championship	Lone Star League, West Texas League	1928
Tri-State Series	Middle Atlantic League, Blue Ridge League	1928–1929
Eastern Series	New England League, Eastern League	1929
Midwest Championship	Central League, Three-I League	1929–1930
Junior World Series	American Association, International League	1932–1934, 1936–1962, 1970–1971, 1973–1974
Midwest Series	Western League, Mississippi Valley League	1933
Pan American Association	Mexican League, Texas League	1959–1961
Dixie Series	Southern League, Texas League	1967
Kodak World Baseball Classic	American Association, International League, Pacific Coast League, Hawaii Islanders (PCL), Caribbean All-Stars	1972
Triple-A World Series	American Association, International League, Pacific Coast League	1983
Triple-A Classic	American Association, International League	1988–1991
Triple-A World Series	International League, Pacific Coast League	1998–2000
Triple-A National Championship Game	International League, Pacific Coast League	2006–2019, 2022–present
