= Joe Echols =

American football coach, college athletics administrator, and baseball player

Biographical details
- Born: March 23, 1917
- Died: March 28, 1977 (aged 60)

Playing career

Baseball
- 1939: Newark Eagles

Coaching career (HC unless noted)

Football
- 1950–1954: Morehouse
- 1955–1960: Norfolk State

Head coaching record
- Overall: 44–41–3

Accomplishments and honors

Championships
- 2 EIAC (1957, 1959)

Joseph G. Echols (March 23, 1917 – March 28, 1977) was an American football coach, college athletics administrator, and Negro league baseball player.

== Early life and baseball career ==
Raised in Englewood, New Jersey, Echols played prep football at St. Cecilia High School in Englewood. In 1939, Echols played for the Newark Eagles of the Negro National League.

== Coaching career ==
Echols served as the head football coach at Morehouse College in Atlanta, Georgia from 1950 to 1954 and at Norfolk State University in Norfolk, Virginia from 1955 to 1960. The home basketball arena on Norfolk State's campus is named Joseph G. Echols Memorial Hall in his honor.

== Death ==
Echols died at the age of 60, on March 28, 1977.

== Head coaching record ==
Year	Team	Overall	Conference	Standing	Bowl/playoffs
Morehouse Maroon Tigers (Southern Intercollegiate Athletic Conference) (1950–1954)
1950	Morehouse	1–6–1	0–6–1	15th	
1951	Morehouse	3–4	2–3	11th	
1952	Morehouse	3–5–1	1–5–1	14th	
1953	Morehouse	5–3	3–3	9th	
1954	Morehouse	4–4	3–3	10th	
Morehouse:		16–22–2	9–20–2		
Norfolk State Spartans (Eastern Intercollegiate Athletic Conference) (1955–1960)
1955	Norfolk State	3–5	3–2	2nd	
1956	Norfolk State	2–6	1–3	5th	
1957	Norfolk State	5–1	4–0	1st	
1958	Norfolk State	5–3	4–2	3rd	
1959	Norfolk State	7–1–1	5–1	1st	
1960	Norfolk State	6–3	4–2	3rd	
Norfolk State:		28–19–1	21–10		
Total:		44–41–3			
National championship Conference title Conference division title or championship game berth
