= EBV (disambiguation) =

EBV is an acronym for the Epstein–Barr virus, a virus in the herpes family.

EBV may also refer to:

== Biology and medicine ==
- Estimated breeding value in animal breeding
- Essential Biodiversity Variables
- Endobronchial valve, a medical implant for a lung

== Other ==
- Escuela Bella Vista, a school in Maracaibo, Venezuela
- Eschweiler Bergwerksverein (Coal Mining Company), Germany
- Ebbw Vale Parkway railway station, Wales (station code)
- EBV Elektronik, a German distributor of electronic components
- Eliza Bryant Village, US, a home for elderly people of color
