= Bus Thompson =

American sports coach and administrator (1912–2001)

Biographical details
- Born: 1912; Gary, West Virginia, U.S.
- Died: August 29, 2001 (aged 89); Opelika, Alabama, U.S.

Playing career

Football
- 1935–1936: Bluefield State
- 1937: New York Brown Bombers

Coaching career (HC unless noted)

Football
- c. 1940: Morristown
- 1950–1955: Fisk

Basketball
- c. 1940: Morristown
- 1945–1950: Morris Brown
- 1950–1970: Fisk

Baseball
- c. 1940: Morristown

Track
- 1956–1960: Fisk

Administrative career (AD unless noted)
- c. 1940: Morristown
- 1954–1977: Fisk

Herbert B. "Bus" Thompson (1912 – August 29, 2001) was an American football, basketball, track coach and college athletics administrator. He served as the head football coach at Fisk University in Nashville, Tennessee from 1950 to 1955. Thompson was also the Fisk's head basketball coach from 1950 to 1970, head track coach from 1956 to 1960, and athletic director from 1954 to 1977.

Born in Gary, West Virginia, Thompson played college football at Bluefield State College in Bluefield, West Virginia, earning black All-American honors in 1935 and 1936 and leading the Colored Intercollegiate Athletic Association—now known as the Central Intercollegiate Athletic Association (CIAA)—in scoring in 1935. He earned the nickname "Bus" because of his powerful running ability as a fullback. Thompson was a member of Kappa Alpha Psi fraternity and was indicted into the Alpha Tau chapter of Bluefield State College in 1936. As a highly respected leader, Bus Thompson attracted many coaches to serve on the coaching staff who were also members of Kappa Alpha Psi.

Thompson played professionally with the New York Brown Bombers in 1937. Thompson began his coaching career as athletic director and head coach of football, basketball, and baseball at Morristown College in Morristown, Tennessee. He was the head basketball coach at Morris Brown College in Atlanta from 1945 to 1950.

Thompson died of pneumonia, on August 29, 2001, at East Alabama Medical Center in Opelika, Alabama. He was survived by his daughter, Marguerite Thompson, his son, Charles Thompson and his grandchildren, Maya Browne, Charles Thompson Jr. And Kelly Thompson.

== Head coaching record ==
=== College football ===
Year	Team	Overall	Conference	Standing	Bowl/playoffs
Fisk Bulldogs (Southern Intercollegiate Athletic Conference) (1950–1955)
1950	Fisk	5–2	5–2	T–3rd	
1951	Fisk	6–2	5–2	4th	
1952	Fisk	6–2	5–1	T–2nd	
1953	Fisk	3–5	3–3	10th	
1954	Fisk	4–4	4–1	7th	
1955	Fisk	2–8	1–5	15th	
Fisk:		26–23	23–14		
Total:					
