= DeWitt Sanford Dykes Sr. =

American architect, minister (1903–1991)

- Born: August 16, 1903; Gadsden, Alabama, U.S.
- Died: August 4, 1991 (aged 87); Knoxville, Tennessee, U.S.
- Burial place: Sherwood Memorial Gardens, Alcoa, Tennessee, U.S.
- Education: Boston University (STM), Gammon Theological Seminary (BD), Clark Atlanta University (BA), Morristown Normal and Industrial College, International Correspondence School
- Occupations: Architect, minister, teacher
- Years active: 1932–1988
- Spouse(s): Violet Thomasine Anderson (m. 1932–1943; her death), Viola Gertrude Logan (m. 1950–1991; his death)
- Children: 2

Rev. DeWitt Sanford Dykes Sr. (August 16, 1903 – August 4, 1991) was an American architect and Methodist minister. He was an early African American architect, known for his Methodist church designs found nationally, of which he designed some seventy churches. His firm was DeWitt S. Dykes and Associates.

== Early life, family, and education ==
DeWitt Sanford Dykes was born on August 16, 1903, in Gladsden, Alabama, to parents Mary Anna Wade and Henry Sanford Roland Dykes. His mother was a mother of six children, and his father was a lay minister of Methodism and brick mason. In 1910, the family moved to Newport, Tennessee. By age 14, Dykes was a master brick mason, which piqued his interest in studying architecture. His father was skeptical he could work as an architect because of discrimination and racism, and instead supported his religious studies.

From 1919 to 1926, Dykes studied in the pre-college division of Morristown Normal and Industrial College (now Morristown College) in Morristown, Tennessee. While he was studying, Dykes earned money as a brick mason. In the summer of 1925, he took a evening drafting class at Cass Technical High School in Detroit.

Dykes received a bachelor's degree in 1930 at Clark College in Atlanta (now Clark Atlanta University); a studied simultaneously at the Gammon Theological Seminary (now Interdenominational Theological Center) in Atlanta, where he received a Bachelor of Divinity degree in 1931; followed by study at the school of theology at Boston University, where he received a Master of Sacred Theology in 1932.

He married Violet Thomasine Anderson in 1932, together they had two kids before she died in 1943. His son, DeWitt S. Dykes Jr. (b. 1938) was an educator and historian at Oakland University. His second wife was school principal Viola Gertrude Logan, they married in 1950.

== Career ==
Dykes was the pastor of the churches in the East Tennessee Annual Conferences of the Methodist church from 1932 to 1954. He worked as a brick mason to supplement his income while living in Knoxville, Tennessee, and worked with architect Francis F. Painter. In March 1951 Dykes started teaching vocational work as an instructor of masonry at Austin High School in Knoxville.

From 1956 until 1968, Dykes worked as a staff member at the Division of Missions, Section of Church Extension, at the United Methodist Church. In this role he determined the feasibility of building new Methodist churches by looking at the financials, evaluating sites, reviewing the local permitting and zoning, leading design reviews, supervising the building, and administering payments. During this time he would design buildings, and he would submit the plans to review and sign off on to the licensed architect in the Division of Missions, Norman Byar.

In 1960, Dykes took courses in architecture at the International Correspondence School (now Penn Foster Career School) a distance education school in Scranton, Pennsylvania. By 1965 he earned a certificate; in 1968, he took the oral portion of the exam to become a registered architect; and a year later he took the written portion of the exam. On March 5, 1970, Dykes became a licensed architect in the state of Tennessee; and in 1973, Dykes became a licensed architect in the state of Virginia. He became a member of the American Institute of Architects (AIA) in 1970; and a member of the Guild for Religious Architecture in Washington, D.C. in 1973.

Dykes died on August 4, 1991 in his home in Knoxville, and he was buried at Sherwood Memorial Gardens in Alcoa, Tennessee.

== List of works ==
- 1957, Bethlehem Methodist Church, Bay Springs, Mississippi
- 1958, Hopewell Methodist, 103 Mine Street, Jefferson, South Carolina
- 1959, Mt. Pleasant Methodist, 2010 Lincoln Avenue, Opa-locka, Florida
- 1959, Brooks Temple Methodist Church, Midway, North Carolina
- 1959, Central Valley Methodist Church, California
- 1961, Ashbury Methodist, 4810 Narrow, Lynchburg, South Carolina
- 1961, Bethel Methodist Church, 331 N. Mechanic Street, Pendleton, South Carolina
- 1962, Alexander Chapel, 1 Moon Street, Cartersville, Georgia
- 1962, Centenary Methodist Church, 830 S. 6th Street, Hartsville, South Carolina
- 1962, Cherry Hill Methodist Church, 3225 Round Road, Baltimore, Maryland
- 1962, Green Pond Methodist, 1045 E. Highway 55, Clover, South Carolina
- 1963, Bass Chapel Methodist, 5064 Bass Chapel, Greensboro, North Carolina; destroyed
- 1963, Burns Methodist Church, 5616 Farrow Road, Columbia, South Carolina
- 1966, Bentley Street Christian, 417 Bentley, Knoxville, Tennessee
- 1967, Canaan Methodist Church, 171 Hwy 61, Ridgeville, South Carolina
- 1976, Lenon–Seney Methodist Church, 2049 Dandridge Ave., Knoxville, Tennessee
- 1977, Clinton Chapel African Methodist Episcopal Zion Church, 546 College Ave., Knoxville, Tennessee
- 1978, Union Mortuary, 1425 McCalla Ave., Knoxville, Tennessee
- 1978, Sertoma Learning Center, 2335 Dandridge Ave., Knoxville, Tennessee; with architect Eugene E. Burr
- 1982, Golden Age Retirement Village, 1109 Beaman Lake Rd., Knoxville, Tennessee
- 1988, Lonsdale Day Care Center, 1212 New York Ave., Knoxville, Tennessee

== See also ==
- African-American architects
- Moses McKissack III, and his firm McKissack & McKissack
