= Norfolk State Spartans football =

College football team

2026 Norfolk State Spartans football team
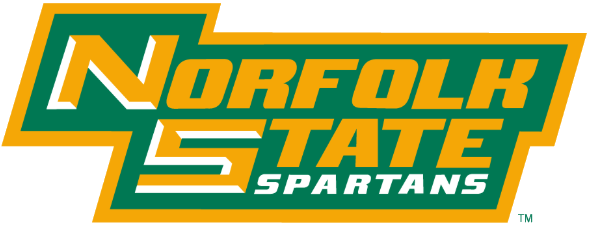
- First season: 1938; 88 years ago
- Head coach: Michael Vick; 2nd season, 1–11 (.083)
- Location: Norfolk, Virginia
- Stadium: William "Dick" Price Stadium (capacity: 30,000)
- NCAA division: Division I FCS
- Conference: MEAC
- Colors: Green and gold
- All-time record: 354–416–13 (.460)
- Bowl record: 0–3 (.000)

Conference championships
- EIAC: 1941, 1949, 1950, 1957, 1959 CIAA: 1974, 1975, 1976, 1984

Division championships
- CIAA North: 1984
- Rivalries: Hampton (rivalry); Old Dominion (rivalry)
- Mascot: Spartans
- Website: NSU Athletics

The Norfolk State Spartans football team represents Norfolk State University in college football at the NCAA Division I Football Championship Subdivision (FCS) level, as a member of the Mid-Eastern Athletic Conference (MEAC). The Spartans play home games at William "Dick" Price Stadium in Norfolk, Virginia.

== History ==
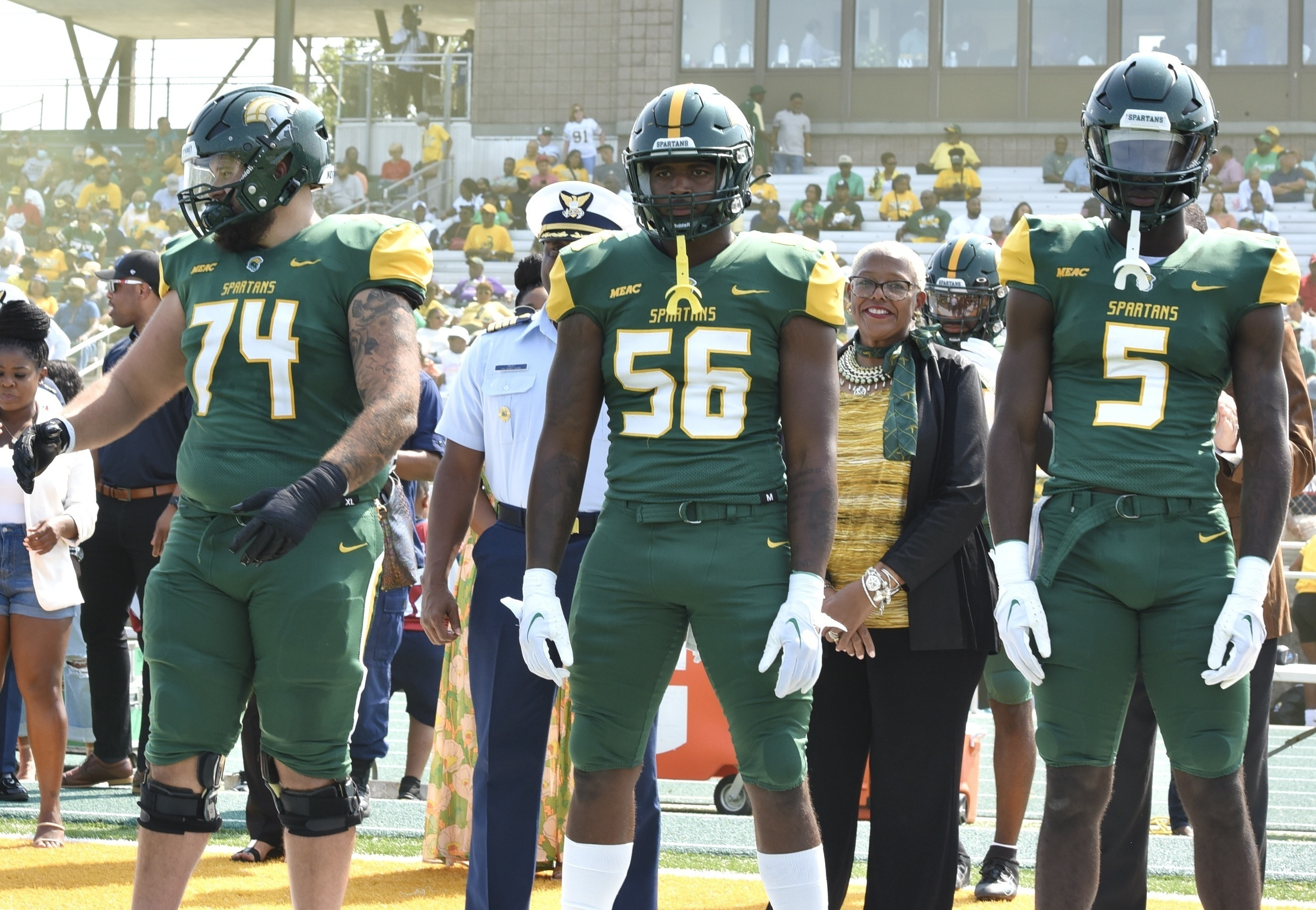
The Spartans football captains in 2022

=== Classifications ===
- 1956–1972: NCAA College Division
- 1965–1969: NAIA
- 1970–1984: NAIA Division I
- 1973–1996: NCAA Division II
- 1997–present: NCAA Division I-AA/FCS

=== Conference memberships ===
- 1938–1939: Independent
- 1940–1961: Eastern Intercollegiate Athletic Conference
- 1962–1996: Central Intercollegiate Athletic Association
- 1997–1998: NCAA Division I-AA independent
- 1999–present: Mid-Eastern Athletic Conference

== Championships ==
=== Conference championships ===
Year	Coach	Conference	Conference record
1941	James Gill	Eastern Intercollegiate Athletic Conference	3–0–1
1949	Leroy Porter	Eastern Athletic Intercollegiate Conference	5–0
1950	Leroy Porter	Eastern Athletic Intercollegiate Conference	4–0–1
1957	Joe Echols	Eastern Athletic Intercollegiate Conference	4–0
1959	Joe Echols	Eastern Athletic Intercollegiate Conference	5–1
1974	Dick Price	Central Intercollegiate Athletics Association	8–0
1975	Dick Price	Central Intercollegiate Athletics Association	7–1
1976	Dick Price	Central Intercollegiate Athletics Association	7–1
1984	Willard Bailey	Central Intercollegiate Athletics Association	6–1

(Note: Norfolk State won the 2011 MEAC football title, but the championship was subsequently stripped by the NCAA in June 2016.)

=== Division championships ===
Year	Coach	Division	Division Record
1984	Willard Bailey	CIAA Northern Division	

== Postseason results ==
=== Bowl games ===
The Spartans have appeared in four bowl games, with a record of 0–3–1.

Season	Bowl	Opponent	Result
1947	Cotton-Tobacco Bowl	Richmond	T 0–0
1974	Gate City Bowl	Tuskegee	L 14–15
1976	Bicentennial Bowl	South Carolina State	L 10–26
1979	Gold Bowl	South Carolina State	L 7–39

=== NCAA Division I playoffs ===
The Spartans have appeared in the NCAA Division I Football Championship playoffs one time with an overall record of 0–1.

Season	Round	Opponent	Result
2011	First Round	Old Dominion	L 18–35

=== NCAA Division II playoffs ===
The Bears have appeared in the NCAA Division II football championship playoffs one time with an overall record of 0–1.

Season	Round	Opponent	Result
1984	Quarterfinals	Towson State	L 21–31

== Rivalries ==
=== Old Dominion ===
NSU and Old Dominion played for the first time on November 26, 2011 in the first round of the FCS playoffs which resulted in a 35–18 Spartan loss. Old Dominion and NSU announced a new deal for a home and away series in 2013 and 2015 to help fill out open game dates for ODU's transition to the FBS. ODU plays at Foreman Field; NSU at Dick Price Stadium.

Norfolk State victories	Old Dominion victories	Tie games

No.	Date	Location	Winning team		Losing team		Series
1	November 26, 2011	Foreman Field	#10 Old Dominion	35	#19 Norfolk State	18	Old Dominion 1–0
2	October 26, 2013	Dick Price Stadium	Old Dominion	27	Norfolk State	24	Old Dominion 2–0
3	September 12, 2015	Foreman Field	Old Dominion	24	Norfolk State	10	Old Dominion 3–0

=== Hampton ===
As of the 2025 season, Norfolk State has a 30–29–1 series lead over the Pirates of Hampton University, another historically black university in the Hampton Roads area.

== Future non-conference opponents ==
Announced schedules as of September 15, 2026

2026	2027	2028	2029	2030
Winston–Salem State	at Campbell	vs Jackson State^{1}	Campbell	at East Carolina
at Old Dominion	at Old Dominion	at Rutgers	at Wake Forest	at James Madison
at Virginia	Richmond	Elon	at Miami (OH)	
Hampton	at Towson	VMI		
at Chicago State	at Elon			
at Robert Morris				
Virginia–Lynchburg				

1. MEAC/SWAC Challenge, Atlanta, GA
