= Dave Rosenfield =

American baseball executive

Dave Rosenfield (June 13, 1929 – February 28, 2017) was an American Minor League Baseball executive who operated the Norfolk Tides from the team's inception in 1963 until 2011. He was named King of Baseball in 2004 and was inducted into the International League Hall of Fame in 2008 and the Virginia Sports Hall of Fame & Museum in April 2016.

== Early life ==
Rosenfield was born in El Paso, Texas in 1929, before moving with his family to California as a small child. He attended UCLA on a baseball scholarship and briefly signed with the Philadelphia Phillies before joining the U.S. Navy in 1951.

== Career ==
Rosenfield served as General Manager of the Tidewater/Norfolk Tides for over 48 years, where after joining the team as assistant general manager in 1962, he was promoted, starting the job in 1963 and holding it through the 2011 season. Following his departure in that capacity, Rosenfield remained an executive vice-president with the team while also serving as a color commentator on Tides' home games through 2016.

In this time he won four International League Executive of the Year Awards (1975, 1982, 1987, 1993). The Tides won five International League titles under him. Rosenfield also served as Vice President of the International League since 1977 and was awarded the President's Trophy for most complete franchise in 1993, the Baseball America Triple A Bob Freitas Award in 1994, and was named the 2004 "King of Baseball", an honorary title by which Minor League Baseball salutes a veteran from the world of professional baseball for long-time dedication and service to the game.

== Other honors ==
Rosenfield was inducted into the Tidewater Shrine, their team Hall of Fame, and in 2008 he was named to the International League Hall of Fame. Rosenfield affected more than just baseball in the Norfolk area, also serving as interim GM of the American Basketball Association's Virginia Squires and GM of the semi-pro football Norfolk Neptunes and the Southern Hockey League's Tidewater Sharks.

Additionally, a character was named after Rosenfield in the November 8, 1990 episode of The Simpsons titled "Dancin' Homer", which was penned by former Tides play-by-play broadcaster Ken Levine.

== Personal life ==
Rosenfield, who had survived a bout with cancer that spread to his bones in 2015 and once weighed as much as 380 pounds, suffered a heart attack in his home on February 18, 2017, and died from complications from the heart attack on February 28, 2017, at the age of 87. The Tides wore a patch in his memory, featuring his face and nickname "Rosey" in the team's uniform font, in a black circle, during the 2017 season.
