= Eastern Intercollegiate Athletic Conference (1939) =

Conference of historically black colleges and universities

The Eastern Intercollegiate Athletic Conference (EIAC) was an intercollegiate athletic conference of historically black colleges and universities (HBCUs) that was founded in 1939. The conference's members were located in Maryland, North Carolina, South Carolina, Tennessee, Virginia, Washington, D.C., and West Virginia.

== History ==
The conference was formed at a meeting held in Norfolk, Virginia, on December 27, 1939, as the Eastern Intercollegiate Athletic Association (EIAA). Present at the meeting were delegates from four charter members: the Norfolk Unit of Virginia Union University (now known as Norfolk State University), which hosted the meeting, Elizabeth City State Teachers College (now known as Elizabeth City State University of Elizabeth City, North Carolina, Fayetteville State Teachers College (now known as Fayetteville State University) of Fayetteville, North Carolina, and Winston-Salem Teachers College (now known as Winston-Salem State University) of Winston-Salem, North Carolina. At a second meeting, held in January 1940, the name of the conference was changed to "Eastern Intercollegiate Athletic Conference" to distinguish it from the Colored Intercollegiate Athletic Association—now known as Central Intercollegiate Athletic Association—another athletic conference in same region on the East Coast of the United States, which was similarly abbreviated as CIAA. At that meeting, two additional schools were given membership in the conference: Kittrell College of Kittrell, North Carolina and Miner Teachers College of Washington, D.C. Kittrell was subsequently dropped from the conference's membership because the junior college was not accredited. At the EIAC's first annual meeting, held in December 1940 at Winston-Salem Teachers College, Friendship College of Rock Hill, South Carolina was admitted as the conference's sixth member. Swift Memorial College of Rogersville, Tennessee had joined the EIAC by early 1941, increasing the conference's membership to seven schools.

EIAC competition was suspended during World War II. Representatives from several colleges met in Norfolk, in December 1945, to reorganize the conference. Livingstone College of Salisbury, North Carolina and Storer College of Harpers Ferry, West Virginia were granted membership in the conference at that meeting. Representatives of the conference met again in the spring of 1946, at Miner Teacher's College in Washington D.C. At the meeting, baseball and tennis were added to the conference's athletic program. At that point, the EIAC's membership included eight schools: Elizabeth City State, Fayetteville State, Kittrell, Livingston, Norfolk Unit, and Storer plus Coppin Teachers College (now known as Coppin State University) of Baltimore and Maryland Teachers College at Bowie (now known as Bowie State University) of Bowie, Maryland.

In December 1948, Virginia Theological Seminary and College—now known as Virginia University of Lynchburg—of Lynchburg, Virginia was added as the EIAC's ninth member. Fayetteville State left the conference for the CIAA in 1954. South Carolina Area Trade School (now known as Denmark Technical College) and Voorhees Junior College (now known as Voorhees University), both located in Denmark, South Carolina, were added to the conference in December 1954. Gideon Smith was elected president of the EIAC in December 1955, succeeding T. S. Jackson. Smith served as president until 1958, when he was succeeded by Sanford R. Perkins of Norfolk State.

== Football champions ==
- 1941: Norfolk State
- 1947: Elizabeth City State
- 1948: Elizabeth City State
- 1949: Norfolk State
- 1950: Norfolk State
- 1951: Fayetteville State
- 1952: Elizabeth City State
- 1953: Elizabeth City State and Morristown
- 1954: Elizabeth City State
- 1955: South Carolina Trade
- 1956: Voorhees
- 1957: Norfolk State
- 1958: South Carolina Trade
- 1959: Norfolk State
- 1960: Livingstone and South Carolina Trade
- 1961: South Carolina Trade
- 1962: South Carolina Trade
- 1963: South Carolina Trade

== Yearly football standings ==
1941 Eastern Intercollegiate Athletic Conference football standings
	Conf.					Overall
Team	W		L		T	W		L		T
Norfolk State $	3	–	0	–	1	6	–	0	–	1
Winston-Salem	2	–	0	–	2	5	–	0	–	3
Miner Teachers	2	–	2	–	0	2	–	3	–	0
Fayetteville State	2	–	3	–	0	2	–	6	–	0
Elizabeth City State	1	–	2	–	1	4	–	2	–	1
Swift	0	–	3	–	0	0	–	6	–	0
$ – Conference champion

1948 Eastern Intercollegiate Athletic Conference football standings
	Conf.					Overall
Team	W		L		T	W		L		T
Elizabeth City State $	4	–	0	–	1	5	–	1	–	1
Fayetteville State	3	–	0	–	2	4	–	3	–	2
Norfolk State	3	–	1	–	1	5	–	3	–	1
Morristown	2	–	2	–	0	3	–	4	–	0
Livingstone	2	–	3	–	0	2	–	7	–	0
Miner Teachers	1	–	2	–	0	?	–	?	–	0
Friendship	0	–	2	–	0	?	–	?	–	?
Storer	0	–	5	–	0	?	–	?	–	?
$ – Conference champion

1949 Eastern Intercollegiate Athletic Conference football standings
	Conf.					Overall
Team	W		L		T	W		L		T
Norfolk State $	5	–	0	–	0	6	–	0	–	0
Morristown	4	–	1	–	0	8	–	2	–	1
Storer	3	–	2	–	0	?	–	?	–	?
Elizabeth City State	3	–	2	–	1	4	–	3	–	1
Fayetteville State	1	–	3	–	1	2	–	5	–	1
Livingstone	1	–	4	–	0	2	–	4	–	0
Virginia Seminary	1	–	4	–	0	?	–	?	–	?
Friendship	0	–	2	–	0	?	–	?	–	?
$ – Conference champion; Standings were based on Dickinson System ratings.

1950 Eastern Intercollegiate Athletic Conference football standings
	Conf.					Overall
Team	W		L		T	W		L		T
Morristown *	3	–	0	–	0	5	–	1	–	1
Norfolk State $	4	–	0	–	1	5	–	2	–	1
Elizabeth City State	2	–	1	–	2	4	–	2	–	2
Fayetteville State *	1	–	1	–	1	4	–	5	–	1
Miner Teachers	2	–	2	–	0	?	–	?	–	?
Virginia Seminary	1	–	3	–	0	2	–	4	–	0
Livingstone	0	–	4	–	0	0	–	6	–	1
Storer *	0	–	2	–	0	?	–	?	–	?
$ – Conference champion; * – Did not play enough conference games to be eligible for championship Standings were based on Dickinson System ratings.

1952 Eastern Intercollegiate Athletic Conference football standings
	Conf.					Overall
Team	W		L		T	W		L		T
Elizabeth City State $	4	–	0	–	0	6	–	2	–	0
Fayetteville State	3	–	1	–	0	6	–	4	–	0
Norfolk State	4	–	2	–	0	5	–	2	–	0
Livingstone	2	–	3	–	0	3	–	4	–	0
Miner Teachers	1	–	3	–	0	?	–	?	–	?
Morristown	0	–	5	–	0	?	–	?	–	?
Storer	0	–	1	–	0	?	–	?	–	?
$ – Conference champion

1953 Eastern Intercollegiate Athletic Conference football standings
	Conf.					Overall
Team	W		L		T	W		L		T
Elizabeth City State +	3	–	0	–	1	5	–	1	–	2
Morristown +	3	–	0	–	1	?	–	?	–	?
Fayetteville State	2	–	2	–	0	3	–	5	–	1
Livingstone	1	–	3	–	0	3	–	4	–	0
Norfolk State	0	–	4	–	0	1	–	6	–	0
+ – Conference co-champions

1954 Eastern Intercollegiate Athletic Conference football standings
	Conf.					Overall
Team	W		L		T	W		L		T
Elizabeth City State $	3	–	0	–	0	8	–	1	–	0
Livingstone	2	–	1	–	0	5	–	2	–	0
Norfolk State	1	–	2	–	0	2	–	4	–	0
Morristown	0	–	3	–	0	0	–	5	–	0
$ – Conference champion

1955 Eastern Intercollegiate Athletic Conference football standings
	Conf.					Overall
Team	W		L		T	W		L		T
South Carolina Trade $	3	–	1	–	0	?	–	?	–	0
Norfolk State	3	–	2	–	0	3	–	5	–	0
Voorhees	2	–	2	–	0	?	–	?	–	?
Livingstone	1	–	4	–	0	2	–	6	–	0
Morristown	1	–	4	–	0	?	–	?	–	?
Elizabeth City State	3	–	0	–	0	7	–	2	–	0
$ – Conference champion; Elizabeth City State was ineligible for the conference title.

1956 Eastern Intercollegiate Athletic Conference football standings
	Conf.					Overall
Team	W		L		T	W		L		T
Voorhees $	5	–	0	–	0	6	–	1	–	0
South Carolina Trade	3	–	2	–	0	?	–	?	–	0
Friendship	2	–	2	–	0	2	–	3	–	1
Livingstone	2	–	4	–	0	4	–	4	–	0
Norfolk State	1	–	4	–	0	2	–	6	–	0
Morristown	1	–	4	–	0	?	–	?	–	?
Elizabeth City State	2	–	0	–	0	3	–	6	–	0
$ – Conference champion; Elizabeth City State was ineligible for the conference title.

1957 Eastern Intercollegiate Athletic Conference football standings
	Conf.					Overall
Team	W		L		T	W		L		T
Norfolk State $	4	–	0	–	0	5	–	1	–	0
Livingstone	4	–	1	–	0	6	–	2	–	1
Friendship	2	–	2	–	0	?	–	?	–	?
South Carolina Trade	2	–	3	–	0	3	–	5	–	0
Morristown	1	–	4	–	0	?	–	?	–	?
Voorhees	1	–	4	–	0	?	–	?	–	?
$ – Conference champion

1958 Eastern Intercollegiate Athletic Conference football standings
	Conf.					Overall
Team	W		L		T	W		L		T
South Carolina Trade $	4	–	1	–	1	4	–	3	–	1
Livingstone	3	–	1	–	0	6	–	2	–	0
Norfolk State	4	–	2	–	0	5	–	3	–	0
Kittrell	3	–	2	–	0	?	–	?	–	?
Voorhees	2	–	2	–	1	?	–	?	–	?
Morristown	1	–	5	–	0	?	–	?	–	?
Friendship	0	–	5	–	0	?	–	?	–	?
$ – Conference champion

1959 Eastern Intercollegiate Athletic Conference football standings
	Conf.					Overall
Team	W		L		T	W		L		T
Norfolk State $	5	–	1	–	0	7	–	1	–	1
Voorhees	4	–	1	–	1	?	–	?	–	?
Livingstone	3	–	1	–	1	5	–	3	–	1
South Carolina Trade	2	–	2	–	0	?	–	?	–	?
Morristown	2	–	3	–	1	?	–	?	–	?
Kittrell	0	–	3	–	1	?	–	?	–	?
Friendship	0	–	4	–	0	?	–	?	–	?
$ – Conference champion

1960 Eastern Intercollegiate Athletic Conference football standings
	Conf.					Overall
Team	W		L		T	W		L		T
South Carolina Trade +	5	–	0	–	1	6	–	1	–	1
Livingstone +	5	–	0	–	1	7	–	2	–	2
Norfolk State	4	–	2	–	0	6	–	3	–	0
Friendship	2	–	4	–	0	?	–	?	–	?
Kittrell	2	–	4	–	0	?	–	?	–	?
Voorhees	2	–	4	–	0	?	–	?	–	?
Morristown	0	–	6	–	0	?	–	?	–	?
+ – Conference co-champions

1961 Eastern Intercollegiate Athletic Conference football standings
	Conf.					Overall
Team	W		L		T	W		L		T
South Carolina Trade $	3	–	0	–	0	6	–	2	–	0
Kittrell	2	–	1	–	0	?	–	?	–	?
Friendship	1	–	2	–	0	?	–	?	–	?
Voorhees	0	–	3	–	0	?	–	?	–	?
Livingstone *	1	–	0	–	0	5	–	4	–	0
Norfolk State *	0	–	1	–	0	3	–	4	–	0
$ – Conference champion; * – did not play enough conference games to be eligible for championship

== See also ==
- List of defunct college football conferences
