= Cleveland Home for Aged Colored People =

Historic residential building in Ohio, United States

- Eliza Bryant Village, formerly the Cleveland Home For Aged Colored People
- U.S. National Register of Historic Places
- Location within Cleveland Location within Ohio Location within the United States
- Location: Cleveland, Ohio
- Coordinates: 41°30′2″N 81°39′14″W
- Architectural style: Colonial Revival, Late Victorian
- MPS: Black History TR
- NRHP reference No.: 82001366
- Added to NRHP: December 17, 1982

Eliza Bryant Village, formerly named the Cleveland Home For Aged Colored People, is a historic residential building in Ohio, United States. It is located at 7201 Wade Park Ave. in Cleveland Ohio.

It was once located at 4807 Cedar Avenue in Cleveland, Ohio, an historic building built in the early 1900s as a residential facility for older black people.

The home was founded by Eliza Bryant, a woman who was active in welcoming African Americans migrating to Cleveland from southern states. In her work, she learned that older African Americans were often left alone as a result of slavery. With the help of Edith Jackson, Sarah Green, and Lethia Cousins Fleming, she began in 1893 to establish a home for older African Americans. A donation from Laura Spelman Rockefeller helped to fund the purchase of the first open, which opened on August 11, 1897. The Cedar Avenue building operated as a 19-bed facility from 1914 through 1967, when the board made the decision to move to a larger 47-bed facility at 1380 Addison Road. The home had been renamed in 1960 to the Eliza Bryant Home for the Aged in recognition of its founder. The Addison Road facility was becoming increasingly expensive to maintain, so the board made the decision to rebuild in the inner city. In 1985, the new Eliza Bryant Center was opened.

The historic building on Cedar Avenue is now owned and operated by Fresh Start, Inc., as Fresh Start Halfway House for men who are recovering from substance abuse. It also provides a 12-week after-care program.

On December 17, 1982, it was added to the National Register of Historic Places

== See also ==
- List of Registered Historic Places in Cleveland, Ohio
