= St. Cecilia High School (New Jersey) =

Defunct Catholic high school in Bergen County, New Jersey, US

- Englewood, Bergen County, New Jersey; United States

Information
- Type: Private high school
- Religious affiliation: Catholic
- Opened: 1901
- Closed: 1986
- Authority: Archdiocese of Newark
- Team name: Saints

St. Cecilia High School was a Catholic high school in Englewood, in Bergen County, in the U.S. state of New Jersey, that operated under the supervision of the Archdiocese of Newark until it closed in 1986.

== History ==
St. Cecilia's Catholic Church was established in 1866 and saw substantial growth in the number of students served by its parochial school, necessitating an expansion that would be able to double the number of students that the school could serve. A building was designed to accommodate 600 students, with a cornerstone ceremony held in May 1901 and a formal dedication in January 1902. The Book of Englewood, a history published by the city in 1922, describes the building as "an imposing edifice of red and gray sandstone."

In 1939, two years after his graduation from Fordham University, Vince Lombardi began his football coaching career at St. Cecilia; he worked there for several years before leaving to take a junior coaching staff position at Fordham, his alma mater. At the school, Lombardi taught algebra, chemistry, physics and Latin; in addition to coaching the school's baseball and basketball squads, he coached the football team to six state titles and a streak of 36 consecutive victories.

Despite efforts by parents to keep the operating, the Newark diocese announced in February 1986 that the school would close at the end of the 1985-86 school year in the face of a drop in enrollment and rising debt.

== Athletics ==
The 1943 football team, coached by Lombardi, earned recognition as the high school national champion with a 12–0 victory against the Brooklyn Prep team led by quarterback Joe Paterno.

The boys' basketball team, also coached by Vince Lombardi, finished the 1945 season with a record of 21-3 after winning the New Jersey Interscholastic Athletic Association (NJSIAA) Parochial state championship against Trenton Catholic High School by a score of 55-51 in the tournament final at the Elizabeth Armory.

The baseball team won the Non-Public B state championship in 1975, defeating Bishop Eustace Preparatory School in the final round of the tournament.

== Notable alumni ==
- Barbara Corcoran (born 1949), real estate investor and agent, who left the school after her freshman year due to poor grades.
- Jack Doolan (1919-2002), running back who played for four seasons in the NFL.
- William J. Dorgan (1921–2003), politician who served in the New Jersey General Assembly, as Mayor of Palisades Park, New Jersey and as a member of the Bergen County Board of Chosen Freeholders.
- Joe Echols (1917–1977), American football coach, college athletics administrator and Negro league baseball player.
- Gordon M. Johnson (born 1949), politician who has served in the New Jersey General Assembly since 2002, where he represents the 37th Legislative District.
- Francis E. Merritt (1920-1995, class of 1939), American football tackle who played college football at the United States Military Academy and was elected to the College Football Hall of Fame in 1996.
- Ian O'Connor (born c. 1964, class of 1982), sports columnist for ESPNNewYork.com, host of The Ian O'Connor Show on ESPN Radio, and author of Arnie & Jack: Palmer, Nicklaus, and Golf's Greatest Rivalry and The Captain: The Journey of Derek Jeter.
- Charles Osgood (1933-2024), radio and television commentator and writer.
- Charles O. Rossotti (born 1941, class of 1958), former Commissioner of Internal Revenue.
- Steve Sesnick (1941–2022), rock club and rock band manager
- Dick Tarrant (born 1928), former head men's basketball coach at the University of Richmond.
- Vince Lombardi (1913-1970), American football coach and executive who led the Green Bay Packers to five NFL championships, including the first two super bowls.
