= Lethia Cousins Fleming =

African-American suffragist (1876–1963)

- Born: Lethia Cousins; November 7, 1876; Tazewell, Virginia, US
- Died: September 22, 1963 (aged 86); Cleveland, Ohio, US
- Burial place: Lake View Cemetery
- Known for: Suffragist, teacher, social worker, civil rights activist, politician
- Spouse: Thomas Wallace Fleming (married 1912)

Lethia Cousins Fleming (November 7, 1876 – September 22, 1963) was an African-American suffragist, teacher, social worker, civil rights activist, and she was active in Republican politics at both local and national levels.

== Early life and education ==
She was born as Lethia Cousins on November 7, 1876, in Tazewell, Virginia, to James Archibald Cousins and Fannie Taylor Cousins. Her father was Black and born free, he served in the Confederate Army and after was a brick mason. Fleming was the oldest of eight children in her family, she attended high school in Ironton, Virginia.

Fleming attended Morristown College in Tennessee; and Bluefield State College in West Virginia; where she studied education. She taught in schools in Virginia, then in McDowell and Cabell counties in West Virginia.

On February 21, 1912, Lethia Cousins and Thomas "Tom" Wallace Fleming (1874–1948) married. Tom was a lawyer and at that time had served one term as Cleveland city councilman, the marriage to Lethia was his second. The couple never had children, and Thomas had three children from his first marriage which Lethia helped raise. She had interest in the Baha'i Faith.

== Work ==
In 1914, Lethia Fleming was chair the Board of Lady Managers of the Cleveland Home for Aged Colored People. She took charge and directed a campaign effort among African-American women to vote for her husband Tom Fleming during the 1915 campaign for a City Council Seat from Ward 11.

Starting in 1920, Fleming directed national campaign efforts among Black women for three Republican presidential candidates, Warren G. Harding (1920), Herbert Hoover (1936), and Alfred M. Landon (1940).

In 1929, Fleming made an attempt to run for a seat in the Cleveland city council, after her husband had been imprisoned.

From 1931 until 1951, she worked as a social worker at the Cuyahoga County Child Welfare Board.

Fleming was member of organizations including Travelers Aid Society, the Cleveland office of National Association for the Advancement of Colored People (NAACP), and the Phillis Wheatley Association. She was on the first board for the Negro Welfare Association (now the National Urban League). Fleming was the first female to be a trustee at Mt. Zion Congregational Church in Cleveland.

She died on September 22, 1963, in Cleveland and is buried at Lake View Cemetery.
