= Dick Price (coach) =

Biographical details
- Born: September 10, 1933; Norfolk, Virginia, U.S.
- Died: February 23, 2009 (aged 75); Norfolk, Virginia, U.S.

Coaching career (HC unless noted)

Football
- 1964–1973: Norfolk State (assistant)
- 1974–1983: Norfolk State

Track and field
- 1964–1974: Norfolk State

Administrative career (AD unless noted)
- 1984–1989: Norfolk State (assistant AD)
- 1989–1999: Norfolk State

Head coaching record
- Overall: 62–41–4 (football)
- Bowls: 0–3

Accomplishments and honors

Championships
- Football; 3 CIAA (1974–1976) Track and field 2 NCAA Division II Men's Outdoor (1973–1974)

Awards
- Football; 2× CIAA Coach of the Year (1974–1975) Track and field 4× CIAA Coach of the Year (1971–1974)

William Leon "Dick" Price (September 10, 1933 – February 23, 2009) was an American football and track and field coach and college athletics administrator. He served as the head football coach at Norfolk State University from 1974 to 1983, compiling a record of 62–41–4 and leading his Norfolk State Spartans football teams to three consecutive Central Intercollegiate Athletic Association (CIAA) in his first three seasons, 1974 to 1976. Price was also the head track and field coach at Norfolk State from 1964 to 1974. His track teams won consecutive NCAA Division II Men's Outdoor Track and Field Championships in 1973 and 1974. William "Dick" Price Stadium, Norfolk State's home football venue, is named for Price.

A native of Norfolk, Virginia, Price graduated from Hampton University in 1957. He died on February 23, 2009, in Norfolk, after suffering from cancer.

== Head coaching record ==
=== Football ===
| Year | Team | Overall | Conference | Standing | Bowl/playoffs |
|---|---|---|---|---|---|
Norfolk State Spartans (Central Intercollegiate Athletic Association) (1974–1983)
| 1974 | Norfolk State | 8–3 | 8–0 | 1st | L Gate City |
| 1975 | Norfolk State | 8–3 | 7–1 | 1st | |
| 1976 | Norfolk State | 8–4 | 7–1 | 1st | L Bicentennial |
| 1977 | Norfolk State | 4–6–1 | 4–3–1 | 5th | |
| 1978 | Norfolk State | 6–4 | 5–3 | T–4th | |
| 1979 | Norfolk State | 8–3–1 | 6–1–1 | T–2nd | L Gold |
| 1980 | Norfolk State | 5–4–1 | 3–3–1 | 6th | |
| 1981 | Norfolk State | 4–5–1 | 3–4 | T–4th (Northern) | |
| 1982 | Norfolk State | 6–4 | 5–2 | T–2nd (Northern) | |
| 1983 | Norfolk State | 5–5 | 2–5 | T–4th (Northern) | |
| Norfolk State: | | 62–41–4 | 50–23–3 | | |
| Total: | | 62–41–4 | | | |
National championship Conference title Conference division title or championship game berth
