= Ian O'Connor =

American sportswriter (born 1964)

Ian O'Connor (born August 29, 1964) is an American sportswriter who is the author of six books, including The New York Times bestsellers Coach K: The Rise and Reign of Mike Krzyzewski; Belichick: The Making of the Greatest Football Coach of All Time; Arnie & Jack: Palmer, Nicklaus, and Golf's Greatest Rivalry; The Captain: The Journey of Derek Jeter; and Out of the Darkness: The Mystery of Aaron Rodgers.

== Early life and education ==
Raised in Englewood, New Jersey, O'Connor graduated from St. Cecilia High School in 1982. He earned a bachelor's degree from Marist College in 1986, and in 2022 was chosen as the commencement speaker for Marist's graduate school ceremonies.

== Career ==
O'Connor started his career as a copy boy for The New York Times, before joining The National, Frank Deford's daily sports publication.

O'Connor is a former columnist and senior writer for The New York Post. He was previously a columnist at the New York Daily News, USA Today, The Journal News, The Record, and Foxsports.com, and also authored the book entitled The Jump: Sebastian Telfair and the High Stakes Business of High School Ball.

O'Connor has finished in first place in 20 national writing contests conducted by organizations including the Golf Writers Association of America, the Associated Press Sports Editors, the Football Writers Association of America, the Society of Professional Journalists Sigma Delta Chi Award, the National Association of Black Journalists, and the United States Basketball Writers Association.

O'Connor is a former reporter for The National Sports Daily and the former host of weekly WEPN-FM and national ESPN Radio shows.

From 2010-2021, he wrote for ESPN.com and was a panelist on ESPN's The Sports Reporters, and a regular contributor to many of the network's daily shows.

In July 2025, after four years as a freelance author, he joined The Athletic.
