= Jack Doolan (American football) =

American football player (1919–2002)

Profile
- Position: Running back

Personal information
- Born: May 16, 1919; Brooklyn, New York, U.S.
- Died: March 23, 2002 (aged 82); Sarasota, Florida, U.S.
- Listed height: 6 ft 1 in (1.85 m)
- Listed weight: 190 lb (86 kg)

Career information
- High school: Englewood (NJ) St. Cecilia
- College: Georgetown

Career history
- Washington Redskins (1945); New York Giants (1945–1946); Chicago Cardinals (1947–1948)

Awards and highlights
- NFL champion (1947)
- Stats at Pro Football Reference

John James Doolan (May 16, 1919 – March 23, 2002) was an American football running back in the National Football League (NFL) for the Washington Redskins, New York Giants, and Chicago Cardinals. He played college football at Georgetown University.
