= Denmark Technical College =

Two-year college in Denmark, South Carolina, US

- Former name: South Carolina Area Trade School
- Type: Public historically black community and technical college
- Parent institution: South Carolina Technical College System
- President: Eric Brown
- Location: Denmark, South Carolina, U.S. 33.3108°N 81.1287°W
- Colors: Blue and white
- Nickname: Panthers
- Sporting affiliations: NJCAA Division I USCAA
- Website: www.denmarktech.edu

Denmark Technical College is a public historically black community and technical college in Denmark, South Carolina. The college primarily serves Bamberg, Barnwell and Allendale counties in South Carolina.

== History ==
The General Assembly of the State of South Carolina authorized the establishment of Denmark Technical College in 1947 and the college began operation on March 1, 1948, as the Denmark Branch of the South Carolina Trade School System. At its inception, the institution functioned under the authority of the South Carolina Department of Education and was mandated to educate black citizens in various trades.

In 1969, the control of Denmark Area Trade School (Denmark Technical College) was transferred to the South Carolina Advisory Committee for Technical Training which acted under the supervision of the State Board for Technical and Comprehensive Education. During the same year, the name of the college was changed to Denmark Technical Education Center.

In 1979, the institution was accredited by the Southern Association of Colleges and Schools Commission on Colleges and assumed its present designation as Denmark Technical College. Since 1948, the college has experienced significant growth and has become a comprehensive two-year college which offers a broad range of programs and services. The college is located in Denmark, South Carolina, a small city of approximately 5,000 people.

The college's primary service area is Bamberg, Barnwell, and Allendale Counties with a legislated mandate to serve students throughout the state.

Lorry H. "Broad River" Dawkins was founding principal. The SC Area Trade School offered courses in such fields as nutritional sciences (cooking and baking); business and secretarial sciences; building sciences (carpentry, painting, plumbing, brick masonry, electrical sciences); air-conditioning and refrigeration; barbering and cosmetology; auto mechanics, shoe repair, and seamstress sciences and tailoring. The school's motto was "He Who Hath a Trade Hath an Estate"; Alumni of the S C Area Trade School have established successful businesses across the United States. Nationally known comedian J. Anthony Brown, who received a degree in Tailoring, is a distinguished graduate.

As of 2025, Tia Wright-Richards serves as interim president of the college. Other past presidents include Joanne Boyd-Scotland, Leonard McIntyre, Michael Townsend, Sr., John K. Waddell, and Willie L. Todd, Jr.
