= Kodak World Baseball Classic =

Minor league baseball competition held in 1972

Tournament information
- Administrator: Minor League Baseball
- Host(s): Honolulu, Hawaii
- Venue: Honolulu Stadium
- Teams: 5

Final positions
- Champion: Caribbean All-Stars
- Runner-up: Albuquerque Dukes

The 1972 World Baseball Classic, known as the Kodak World Baseball Classic for sponsorship purposes, and alternatively referred to as the World Baseball Championship, was a Minor League Baseball tournament held in Honolulu in 1972. It was the replacement for the Junior World Series that year, gathering the league champions of the International League (IL), Pacific Coast League (PCL), and the American Association (AA). Also participating were the hosting Hawaii Islanders team of the PCL and a team of Caribbean All-Stars, representing the Latin American winter leagues (though all the Caribbean players were active in the American minor league system).

The tournament was won by the Caribbean All-Stars, who came back from a 3–1 deficit to secure four straight wins, including the championship game against the PCL's Albuquerque Dukes.

The organizers of the classic had ambitious hopes for the "minor league championship of the world." Teams from the Mexican League and from Japan's Nippon Professional Baseball were invited, but both declined, citing scheduling concerns. Rumored future sites for the event included Mexico City, Tokyo, Caracas, and Seattle.

However, the event was a financial disaster. The tournament lost more than US$80,000 and drew just 10,923 fans, compared to projections of over 40,000.

== Participating teams ==
=== Group stage ===
Pos	Team	W	L
1	Albuquerque Dukes (PCL)	3	1
2	Tidewater Tides (IL)	3	1
3	Evansville Triplets (AA)	2	2
4	Hawaii Islanders (PCL)	1	3
4	Caribbean All-Stars	1	3

=== Playoffs ===
September 17, 1972	Caribbean All-Stars	5 – 3	Hawaiian Islanders	Honolulu Stadium, Honolulu

September 17, 1972	Caribbean All-Stars	6 – 5	Evansville Triplets	Honolulu Stadium, Honolulu

September 18, 1972	Caribbean All-Stars	2 – 0	Tidewater Tides	Honolulu Stadium, Honolulu

September 19, 1972	Caribbean All-Stars	6 – 2	Albuquerque Dukes	Honolulu Stadium, Honolulu

== Awards ==
All-Tournament Team
Pos.	Player	Club
SP	Mike McCormick	Hawaii Islanders
RP	Oscar Zamora	Caribbean All-Stars (Oklahoma City 89ers)
C	George Pena	Caribbean All-Stars (Toledo Mud Hens)
1B	Ramon Webster	Caribbean All-Stars (Iowa Oaks)
1B	Tom Paciorek	Albuquerque Dukes
2B	Pedro García	Caribbean All-Stars (Evansville Triplets)
3B	Ron Cey	Albuquerque Dukes
SS	José Martínez	Caribbean All-Stars (Omaha Royals)
OF	Ossie Blanco	Caribbean All-Stars (Wichita Aeros)
OF	Larry Hisle	Albuquerque Dukes
OF	Dave Schneck	Tidewater Tides
Man.	Tony Pacheco	Caribbean All-Stars (Oklahoma City 89ers)

== See also ==
- 1972 Amateur World Series

== Bibliography ==
- Spink, Taylor, ed. (1973). 1973 Sporting News Official Baseball Guide. Sporting News, Inc.
