= Eliza Bryant =

American humanitarian (1827–1907)

Eliza Simmons Bryant
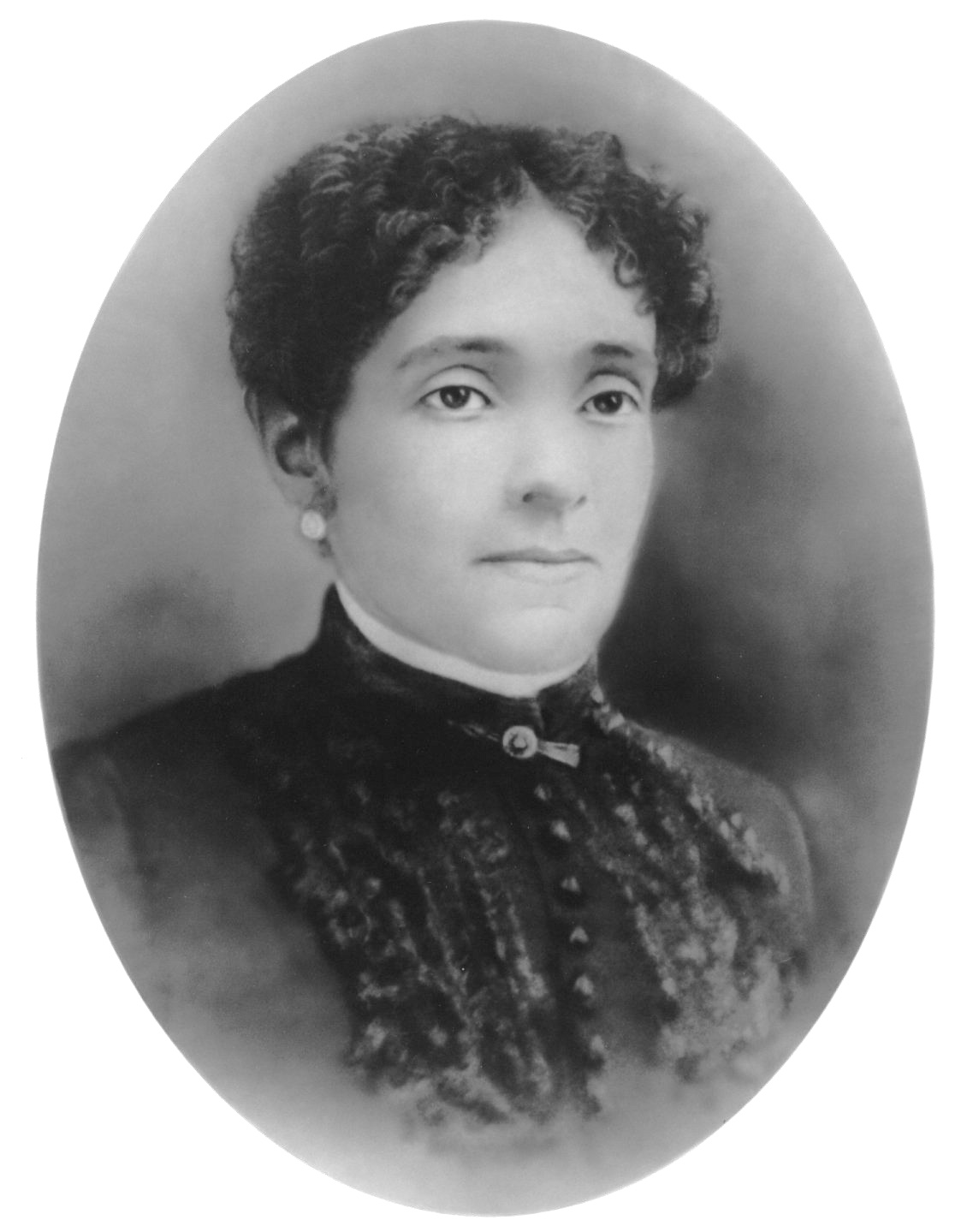
- Born: 1827
- Died: May 13, 1907 (aged 79–80)
- Burial place: Woodland Cemetery

Eliza Simmons Bryant (1827 – May 13, 1907) was an American humanitarian. She was the daughter of a free woman of color, possibly Native American. She moved to Cleveland, OH during the 1850s. After the American Civil War, she and her mother helped former slaves who came to Cleveland. With a group of other women, she established the Cleveland Home for Aged Colored people in 1896 which has become the longest continuing home for aged colored people. In 1960, its name was changed to Eliza Bryant Home for the Aged, in honor of its founder. Later, in 1999, the name was changed to Eliza Bryant Village (EBV).

== Early days ==
Mary Simmons nicknamed "Polly" was born in 1804 to Fereby Simmons, a free woman of color in North Carolina. Therefore, Eliza Simmons Bryant, who was her daughter, was also born free. It is possible these women were descended from the Winyaws Tribe of the Tuscaroras Nation. Eliza was raised on a plantation in Wayne County. Polly Simmons bought property from her brother Calvin in 1838 and additional land from a neighbor Kinon Milard in 1847. Needham Bryant applied for a marriage license for himself and Eliza Simmons in Cuyahoga County in 1853. Buckner and John Simmons can be found in various Cleveland City Directories from 1848. The family was known for providing shelter, food and water to black families.

== Humanitarian work ==
Eliza Bryant became a pioneer in the movement to assist African Americans in the Cleveland area, especially those who had moved from the southern states during the Great Migration after Emancipation Proclamation. She became particularly concerned for elderly African-Americans, who were tremendously suffering from the poor living conditions in Cleveland. The majority of these were freed slaves, with nothing given to them except their freedom. Because of ethnic, religious and racial segregation, existing facilities such as the Dorcas Home (aged white women) or the Baptist Home would not admit African Americans.

In 1893, after a visit to the Pittsburgh Home for Aged Colored People, Edith Jackson gathered a group of women which included Eliza Bryant, Sarah Green and Lethia Flemming. These women began the work of establishing a home for aged black women, but also allowed male residents. They sought help for their cause through churches, community groups, business community, friends and family. Eliza and members of the Lady Board of Managers recruited volunteers who went door to door to raise money, food and clothing. Because of the appeal of a group of black women that included Prudence Jones, Lethia Fleming, Marie Taylor Perkins; Mrs. Laura Spellman Rockefeller made a financial contribution, which helped to enable the purchase of the first home. In January 1895 a board of managers composed of women and a male treasurer was named for the proposed home. By 1896, enough funds were raised and a house was purchased for $2,000 with barely any necessities. The Cleveland Home for Aged Colored People was incorporated on September 1, 1896, and opened on August 11, 1897. The home has been a central fixture of philanthropy by and for African Americans in Cleveland.

Eliza Bryant died in 1907, and is buried at Woodland Cemetery in Cleveland. Over the years, the Cleveland Home for Aged Colored People struggled to support itself, but has been a pillar of the Black Community. After the advent of Social Security and eventually Medicaid the financing became more stable. The Dorcas Home closed and moved to the Cleveland Suburbs in 1967 selling its property in Hough to Eliza Bryant for $1. Another major gift from the closing of Forest City (African American) Hospital enabled the home to renovate, modernize and continue its tradition of quality and compassionate care for elderly African Americans.
