= William "Dick" Price Stadium =

Stadium in Norfolk, Virginia, United States

Coordinates: 36°50′49.07″N 76°15′36.19″W

William "Dick" Price Football Stadium
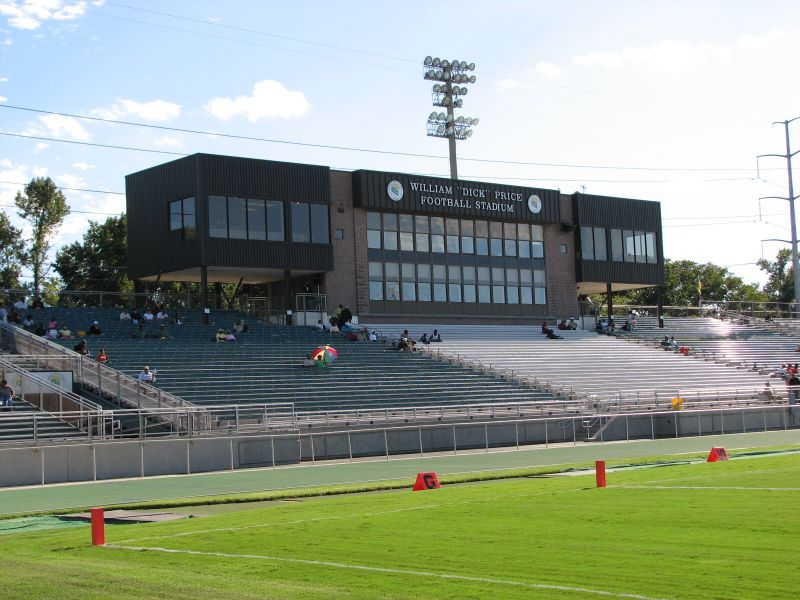
- Interactive map of William "Dick" Price Football Stadium
- Location: 700 Park Avenue; Norfolk, VA 23504
- Owner: Norfolk State University
- Operator: Norfolk State University
- Capacity: 30,000
- Surface: Shaw Sports Spike Zone Pro

Construction
- Groundbreaking: April 4, 1996
- Opened: August 30, 1997
- Cost: $12.2 million (U.S.) ($24.5 million in 2025 dollars)
- Architects: Shriver and Holland Associates

Tenant
- Norfolk State Spartans

William "Dick" Price Football Stadium is a 30,000-seat, multi-purpose stadium located on the campus of Norfolk State University in Norfolk, Virginia, United States. It opened in 1997. The home of the Norfolk State Spartans football team, it was named in honor of former athletics director and head football and track coach Dick Price. The stadium features mostly bleacher seats with some chairbacks and has two videoboards, one behind each end zone.

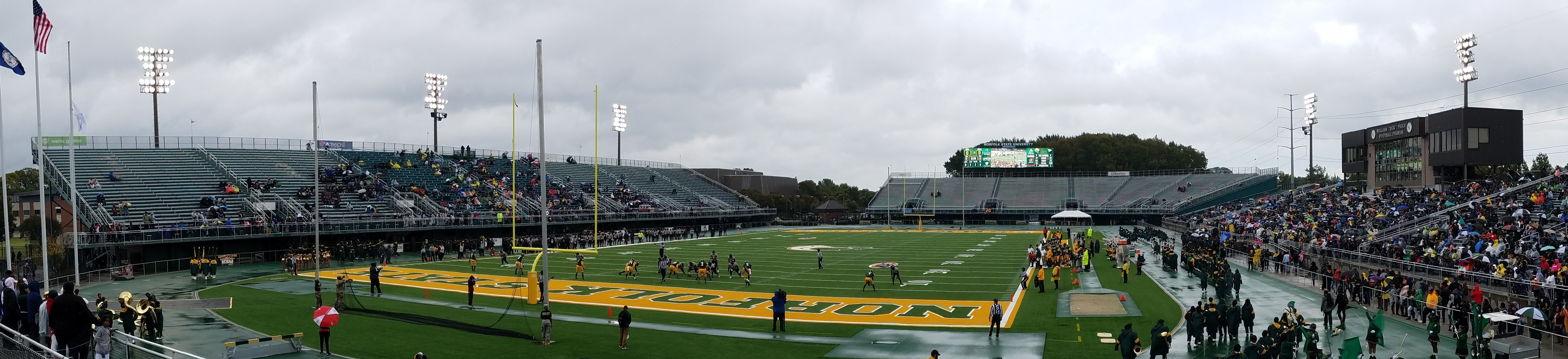
Dick Price Stadium during a 2018 football game

== See also ==
- List of NCAA Division I FCS football stadiums
