= Myers Field =

Former baseball park in Norfolk, Virginia

Coordinates: 36°52′01″N 76°16′52″W

Myers Field was a ballpark located off of Church Street in Norfolk, Virginia, United States. It served as the home of the Norfolk Tars, a New York Yankees minor league affiliate, from 1940 to 1955. Prior to using Myers Field, the Norfolk Tars used Bain Field, which was demolished in 1940. Originally known as High Rock Park, it was renamed Myers Fields in honor of local dentist Eddie Myers.

Notable major leaguers like Yogi Berra, Lew Burdette, Whitey Ford, Bob Grim, Mickey Owen, Bob Porterfield, Vic Raschi, Bobby Richardson, Spec Shea, Moose Skowron, Snuffy Stirnweiss and Gus Triandos all played for the Tars and therefore called Myers Field home.

The football team of the Norfolk Division of Virginia Union University—now known as Norfolk State University—played its home games at High Rock Park in 1947.
