= Morristown College =

Historically black college in Morristown, Tennessee, US

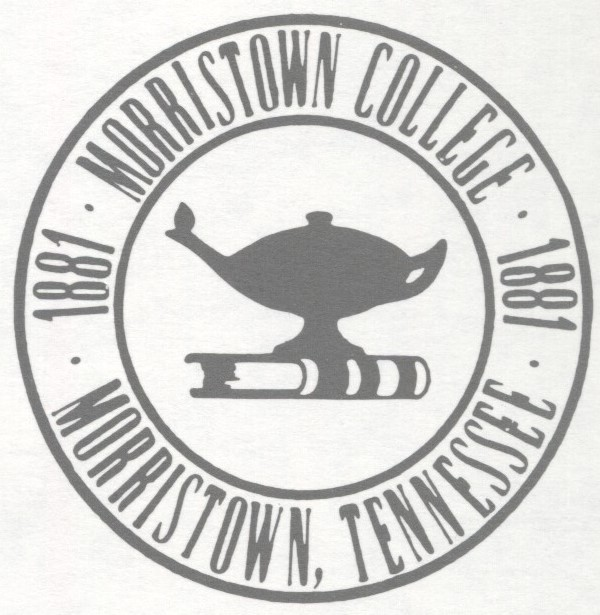
- Former names: Morristown Seminary; Morristown Seminary & Normal Institute; Morristown Normal Academy; Morristown Normal College; Morristown Normal and Industrial College; Knoxville College-Morristown Campus
- Motto: Fides, Scientia
- Active: 1881–1994
- Affiliations: Methodist Episcopal
- Location: Morristown, Tennessee, United States; 36°13′16″N 83°17′34″W
- Colors: Red and Black
- Mascot: Red Knights

- Morristown College Historic District
- Formerly listed on the U.S. National Register of Historic Places
- U.S. Historic district
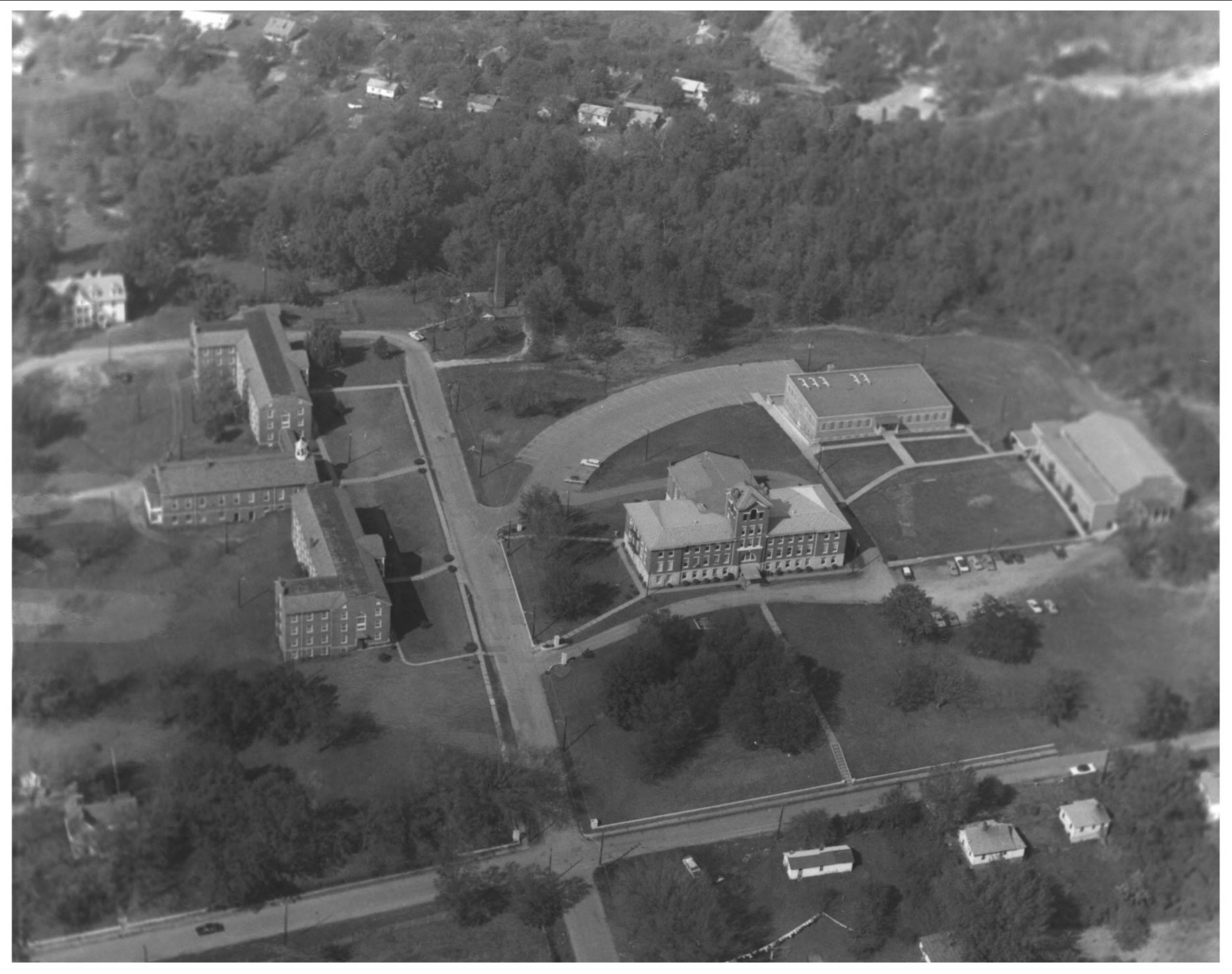
- Aerial view of campus in 1983

- Location within Tennessee Location within the United States
- Location: 417 N. James St., Morristown, Tennessee, United States
- Area: 30 acres (12 ha)
- Built: 1892
- Architectural style: Colonial Revival, Georgian Revival, Queen Anne, Late Victorian
- NRHP reference No.: 83003036

Significant dates
- Added to NRHP: 15 September 1983
- Removed from NRHP: 26 June 2017

Morristown College was an African American higher education institution located in Morristown, the seat of Hamblen County, Tennessee. It was founded in 1881 by the national Freedman's Aid Society of the Methodist Episcopal Church. The school was renamed Knoxville College-Morristown Campus in 1989 and closed in 1996. Prior to the civil rights movement, the college held the distinction of being one of only two institutions in East Tennessee for African Americans, the other being Knoxville College, founded in 1875.

The 52-acre (210,000 m^{2}) campus was perched on a hill in the middle of Morristown and surrounded by five distinct neighborhoods. Seven of the college's nine buildings were on the National Register of Historic Places. After operations ceased, most of the college buildings fell into disrepair, succumbing to vandalism and neglect. The campus was demolished to make way for a city park which opened in 2019.

== History ==
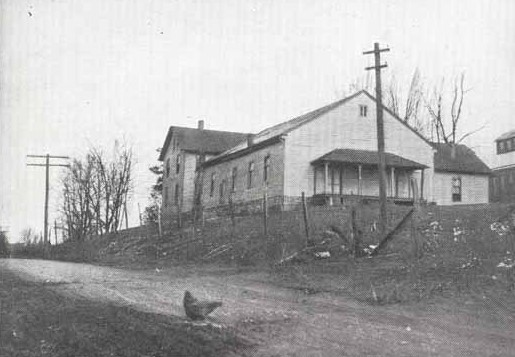
One of the original buildings of Morristown College.

By the fall of 1868, the freedmen of Jefferson County's Morristown district established a small grammar school, attracting students from the community and other areas of the state and the South. Little is known about the early years of this school, though the building it housed was a modest church provided by the Presbyterians of Orange, New Jersey. Led by Mrs. Hanford, an Ithaca, New York native, the school was used to teach freedmen and free persons of color to spell, read, and learn arithmetic along with the obligatory learning of Christian values. A few blocks away was the Reagan High School for Boys, where a college preparatory course was taught by Rev. Wilson. Built as a meeting house in 1830 by a Baptist congregation, it had served as a slave mart, held secession discussions, and housed a hospital for Union and Confederate armies during the Civil War.

In November 1869, Mrs. Hanford was replaced by Almira H. Stearns, a Plainfield, Vermont native. Stearns, who lost her husband and a son to the Civil War, moved to the area with her daughter, Anna, to do missionary work. Relying upon their Christian faith and the assistance of supporters, the harshness of the Reconstruction era and local resistance toward the school were taken in stride as student growth and learning was on a steady pace, reaching a wide variety of age groups. In 1880, the Holston Conference of the Methodist Episcopal Church voted to segregate the preachers, forming a separate conference for African Americans.

Discovering the lack of black preachers as a result, a handful of white men volunteered to join and assist. Among these volunteers was Rev. W.C. Graves, presiding elder of the Morristown District. Believing in a critical need for a school providing education for blacks beyond primary grades as well as preachers for black churches, Graves, along with the support of newly elected M.E. Church Bishop Henry W. Warren, decided the location held by Stearns and others was suitable. By 1881, Stearns and her pupils took possession of the church and school building, establishing Morristown Seminary. In October of the same year, Dr. Judson S. Hill, a 27-year-old pastor and missionary from Trenton, New Jersey, was asked by the bishop of the Holston Conference to turn the school into a full-fledged seminary and normal school to contribute teachers and ministers to East Tennessee's black communities. With the assistance of Nannie McGinley as part of the faculty, the path of the school was set into motion.

=== Establishment ===
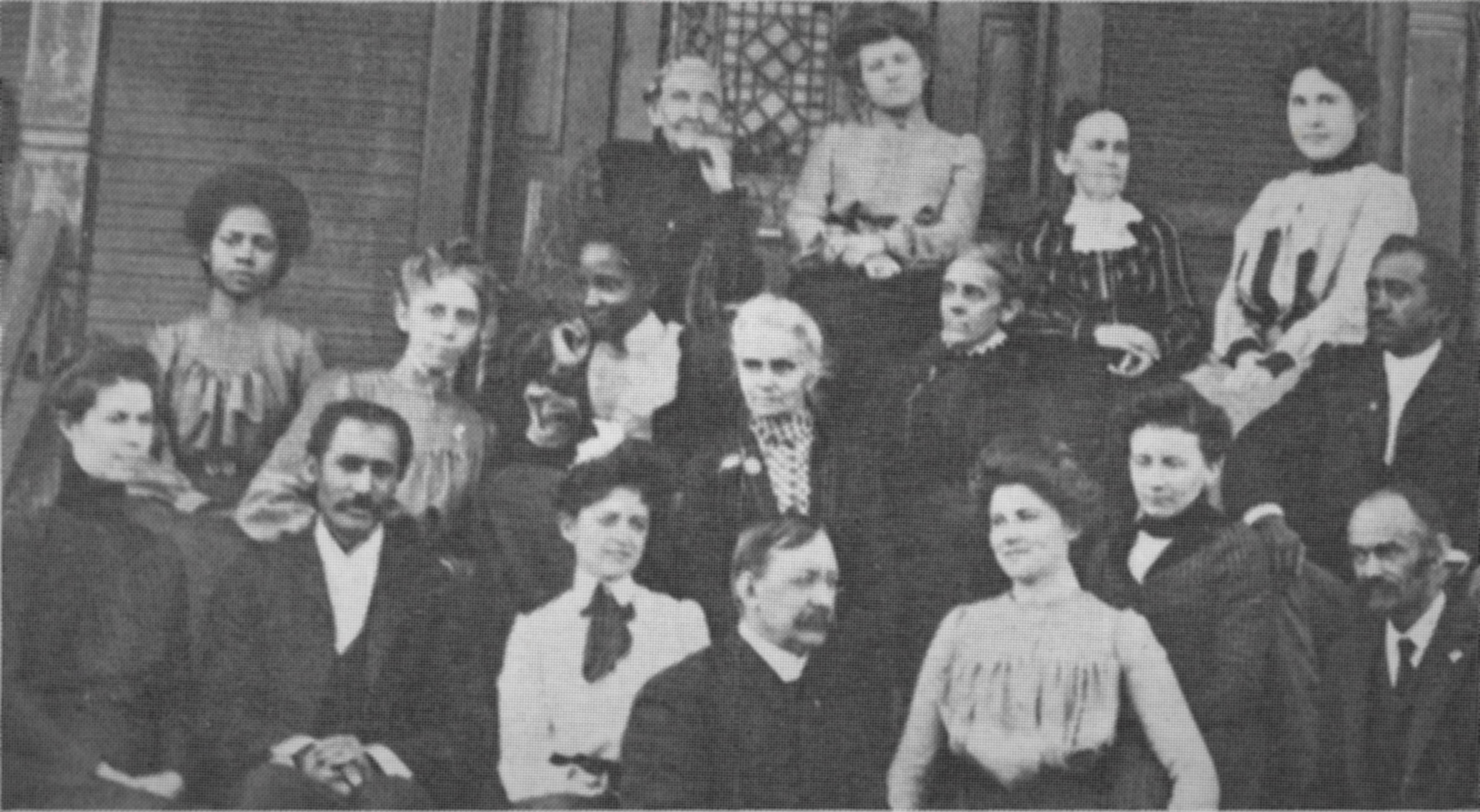
Some of the first faculty members of Morristown College. Notable figures include Almira Stearns (top row, left) and Dr. Judson Hill (bottom row, center)

After being pastor for the First Methodist Church of Chattanooga and doing missionary work, Judson Hill and his wife Laura moved to the Morristown area. Hill had an urge to do work in the South after training at Madison University (now Colgate) and Crozer Theological Seminary. Once appointed president, the tedious job of building and maintaining the school began. Under Hill's leadership, the college grew to over three hundred students by the turn of the century. To raise money for needed classroom buildings and dormitories, Hill secured funds from northern philanthropists such as Andrew Carnegie, the McCormick's and Swift's of Chicago, and the Kellogg's of Battle Creek, Michigan. In addition, Hill solicited contributions from local merchants and sought improved relations with the city. Through his successes in fundraising, Hill was able to launch a major expansion and building program for the college that included the construction of dormitories, classrooms, administrative offices, and a dining facility. The school also acquired a 300-acre (120 ha) dairy farm. Lobbying with the community through various means also helped to ease tensions, foster cooperation, and land considerable praise for the work and dedication the school provided to the growing number of students and the community at large.

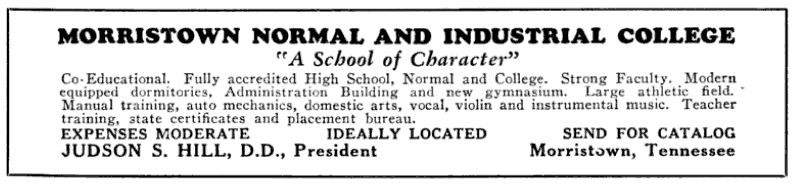
Typical advertisement found in The Crisis magazine (1931).

Hill's improvements at the school occurred within the larger context of the Jim Crow South. Most whites saw little need for and imposed resistance toward African American education, especially higher education. Many northern and southern leaders, and even some black educators such as Booker T. Washington, tried to compromise with the white society by channeling African Americans into industrial and vocational education. Following this trend, Hill introduced industrial training and, by 1901, the college was renamed Morristown Normal and Industrial College. Some of the industrial courses offered for male students included woodworking, brick-making and masonry, carpentry, iron-molding, shoemaking, broom manufacturing, and agricultural training. For the females, domestic science classes included sewing, cooking, and serving techniques. The products created in these classes, such as brooms, were sold across the United States, and the profits were then given back to the college. For the remainder of Hill's presidency, industrial education was the central focus of the Morristown curriculum, decreasing the earlier emphasis on teacher and clergy training. Hill's death in 1931, coupled with the onset of the Great Depression, brought dramatic changes to the college.

=== Growth ===
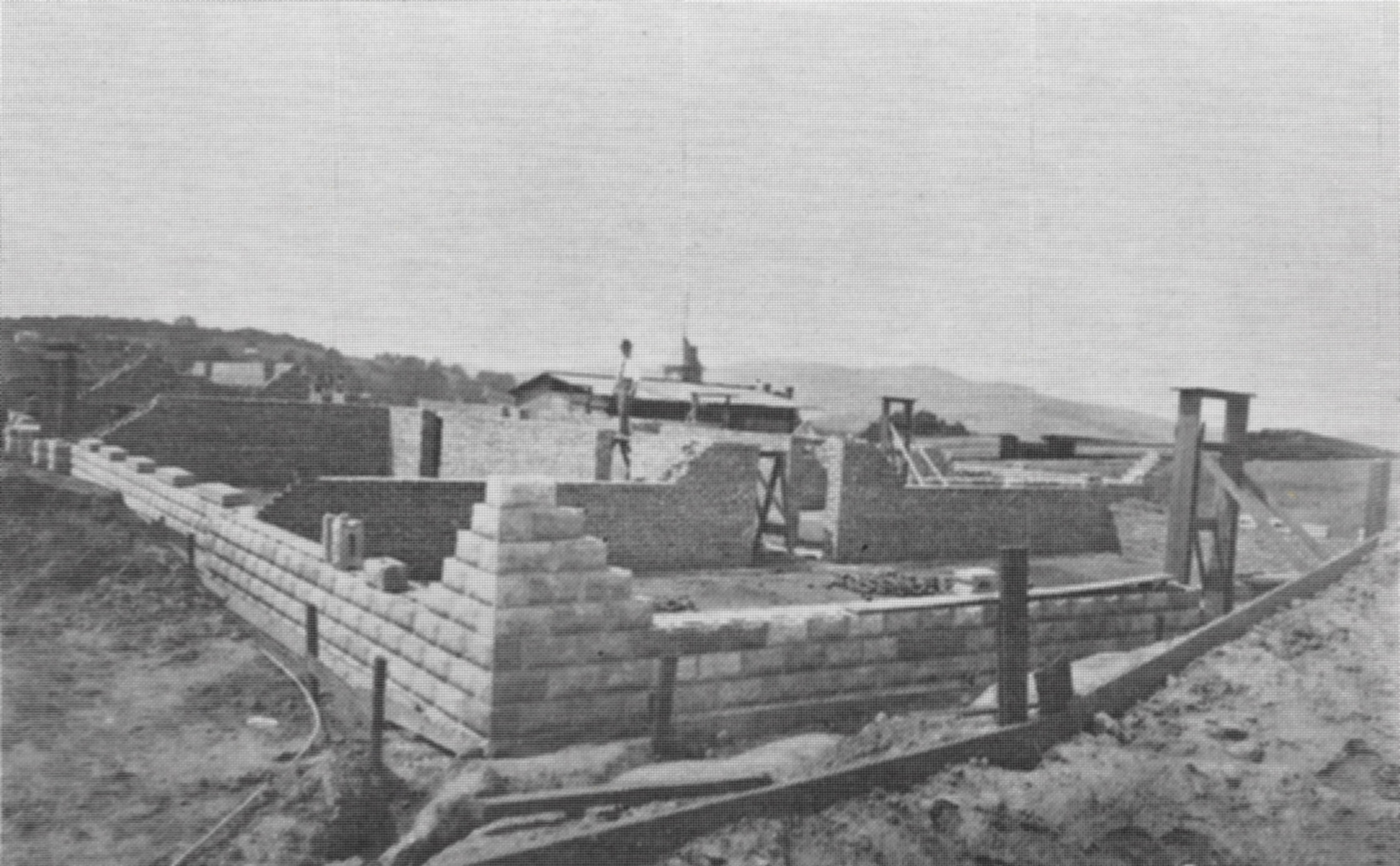
Construction of Laura Yard Hill Hall

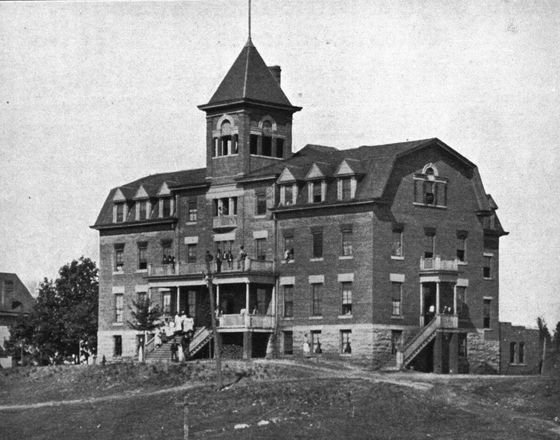
Crary Hall in the early 1900s

After Hill's passing and two years of searching, the Board of Schools of the Methodist Church selected Edward C. Paustin as the new president. During his three-year tenure, Paustin changed the direction of the school from industrial training to a more traditional liberal arts education. It is likely that the expense of maintaining the shops during a time of economic crisis drove some of these policies. Despite his efforts, Paustin was unable to turn the school around financially and he resigned in 1937. J.W. Haywood succeeded Paustin, becoming the college's first black president and managing the school for seven years.

In 1944, Miller W. Boyd, an Abingdon, Virginia native, became the first Morristown College alumnus to be president of the institution. He sought funding for the school by establishing relationships with Morristown's business community, instituting financial support from alumni, and gaining support from the Holston Conference. Through his efforts, enrollment rose to 435 (the largest in the school's history), the college's finances improved, and relations with the community were further raised.

Boyd elevated the college to levels not seen since Dr. Hill's tenure. When some thought the college was headed toward demise, Boyd thought otherwise, working tirelessly to promote spirit and loyalty among the students and staff. In the fall of 1952, Boyd died and his wife, Mary Whitten, served as interim president for the remainder of the year. H.L. Dickason, former president of Bluefield State College, succeeded Whitten in 1953 until his death in 1957. Other presidents included Dr. Leonard Haynes, Jr., Dr. Elmer P. Gibson, Dr. Raymond E. White, and Dr. Charles Wade.

=== Post-civil rights era and legacy ===
After the civil rights movement of the 1960s, African Americans were able to attend previously all-white, state-supported colleges and universities. As a result, Morristown College found it increasingly difficult to compete with the larger public institutions that could offer cheaper tuition and received state and federal funds. In 1959, the college ended high-school level instruction, though two years later it became the first HBCU to be accredited by the Southern Association of Colleges and Schools as a junior college. Over the next 20 years, the college continued to struggle financially as students, potential or otherwise, were drawn to other institutions and regions. In 1989, Knoxville College acquired Morristown College and began operating it as a satellite campus. However, Knoxville College also had its challenges and closed the facility in 1994.

The historic campus of Morristown College was listed in 1983 on the National Register of Historic Places for its architectural significance and its important contributions to African American education. Its significant architectural examples included Queen Anne and Georgian Revival styles, but the campus suffered from neglect.

== Notable alumni ==
- DeWitt Sanford Dykes Sr. (1903–1991), American architect, Methodist minister; attended 1919 to 1926
- Lethia Cousins Fleming (1876–1963), American suffragist, teacher, civil rights activist and politician
- Shirley Hemphill (1947–1999) American actress and comedian known for her role on the TV series, What's Happening!!; class of 1967

== Fulton-Hill Park ==
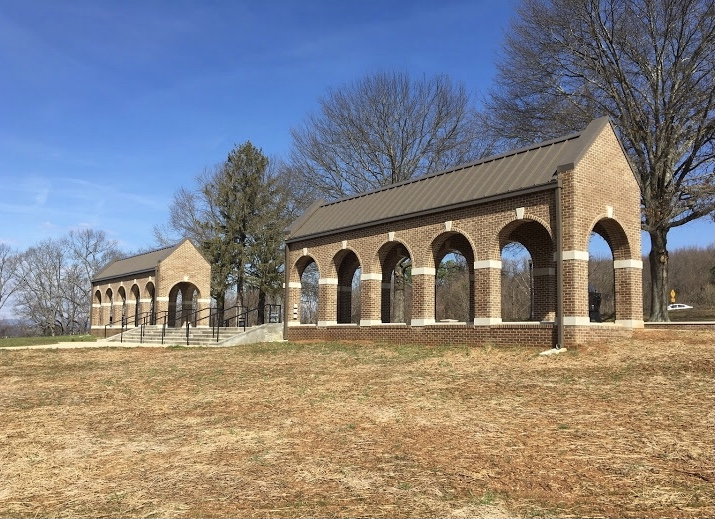
Replica colonnades at Fulton-Hill Park, which was constructed and completed on the college site in 2019

After Morristown College closed in 1994, the property was auctioned off and changed owners twice. Due to neglect by the site's owners, most of the college buildings fell into disrepair, succumbing to vandalism and fires.

In November 2016, it was announced that the city of Morristown had agreed to buy the site of Morristown College for $900,000. By January 2017, the remaining buildings had been demolished and the campus was subsequently delisted from the National Register of Historic Places. Heritage Park opened on November 16, 2019, featuring a replica of Morristown College's colonnade.

In October 2020, a group of Morristown residents gathered to suggest the Morristown City Council rename Heritage Park to Legacy Park, citing alleged connotations to the controversial preservation of Confederate history. The usage of the term on the park's site, which served as Morristown College and a former slave market, was found to be not culturally appropriate by the Morristown City Council, and the name change is being considered.

On November 17, 2020, the Morristown City Council approved to rename Heritage Park to Fulton-Hill Park, in honor Andrew Fulton, a former slave and Morristown College alumni, and Judson S. Hill, Morristown College's first president.

In December 2020, the Morristown City Council approved the beginning of phase two of development at Fulton-Hill Park, which consists of constructing a new hiking trail system and entry signage for the park.

The park currently serves as a public park operated and maintained by the City of Morristown Parks and Recreation Department. The park features a performance lawn, a walking trail, and a historical education site. Since 2019, the park has been the site of the annual Arts in the Park event.
