= National Register of Historic Places listings in Bamberg County, South Carolina =

Location of Bamberg County in South Carolina

This is a list of the National Register of Historic Places listings in Bamberg County, South Carolina.

This is intended to be a complete list of the properties and districts on the National Register of Historic Places in Bamberg County, South Carolina, United States. The locations of National Register properties and districts for which the latitude and longitude coordinates are included below, may be seen in a map.

There are 12 properties and districts listed on the National Register in the county, including 1 National Historic Landmark.

This National Park Service list is complete through NPS recent listings posted March 21, 2025.

== Current listings ==
	Name on the Register	Image	Date listed	Location	City or town	Description
1	American Telephone and Telegraph Company Building	American Telephone and Telegraph Company Building	July 8, 1999 (#99000815)	124 N. Palmetto Ave. 33°19′36″N 81°08′31″W	Denmark	
2	Bamberg City Hall	Bamberg City Hall	September 28, 2005 (#05001099)	3069 Main Highway; 33°17′47″N 81°02′07″W	Bamberg	
3	Bamberg Historic District	Bamberg Historic District	May 19, 1983 (#83002184)	E. Railroad Ave. and 2nd, Midway, Elm, Cannon, N. Carlisle, and Church Sts. 33°17′47″N 81°01′54″W	Bamberg	
4	Bamberg Post Office	Bamberg Post Office	May 22, 2007 (#07000074)	11955 Heritage Highway; 33°17′47″N 81°02′02″W	Bamberg	
5	Gen. Francis Marion Bamberg House	Gen. Francis Marion Bamberg House	June 29, 1976 (#76001692)	N. Railroad Ave. and N. Carlisle St. 33°17′50″N 81°02′57″W	Bamberg	
6	Cal Smoak Site		January 6, 1986 (#86000042)	Address Restricted	Bamberg	
7	Copeland House	Copeland House	October 18, 1991 (#91001494)	Secondary Road 389, 0.3 miles south of its junction with South Carolina Highway 64; 33°05′43″N 81°02′47″W	Ehrhardt	
8	Denmark High School	Denmark High School	March 29, 2001 (#01000297)	N. Palmetto Ave. 33°19′42″N 81°08′26″W	Denmark	
9	Mizpah Methodist Church	Mizpah Methodist Church	December 13, 2000 (#00001531)	Junction of U.S. Route 301 and S-5-31; 33°07′07″N 81°10′46″W	Olar	
10	Rivers Bridge State Park	Rivers Bridge State Park	February 23, 1972 (#72001187)	6 miles southwest of Ehrhardt; 33°03′22″N 81°05′45″W	Ehrhardt	
11	Voorhees College Historic District	Voorhees College Historic District	January 21, 1982 (#82003830)	Voorhees College campus 33°18′23″N 81°07′42″W	Denmark	
12	Woodlands	Woodlands	November 11, 1971 (#71000742)	3 miles south of Bamberg on U.S. Highway 78; 33°17′27″N 80°55′53″W	Bamberg	

== See also ==
- List of National Historic Landmarks in South Carolina
- National Register of Historic Places listings in South Carolina
