= List of United States post office murals in South Carolina =

Following is a list of United States post office murals created in South Carolina between 1934 and 1943.

Location	Mural title	Image	Artist	Date	Notes	NRHP-listed
Anderson	Corn, Cotton and Tobacco Culture		Arthur Covey	1940	oil on canvas	
Bamberg Post Office, Bamberg	Cotton the World Over		Dorothea Miersch	1939	oil on canvas	yes
Batesburg-Leesville	Peach Orchard		Irving A. Block	1941		
Clemson	Meeting of the Original Directors of Clemson College		John Carroll	1941	oil on canvas; on display at Clemson University	
Greer Post Office, Greer	Cotton and Peach Growing		Winfred Walkley	1939		2011
Kingstree	Rice Growing		Arnold Friedman	1939	oil on canvas	
Mullins	Tobacco Industry		Lee Gatch	1940	mural is missing; winner of the 48-State Mural Competition	
Summerville	Train Time – Summerville		Bernadine Custer	1939	oil on canvas	
Walterboro	Past and Present Agriculture and Industry of Colleton County		Sheffield Kagy	1938		
Ware Shoals	American Landscape		Alice Kindler	1940		
Winnsboro	Industrial Tapestry		Auriel Bessemer	1938	landscape	
Woodruff	Cotton Harvest		Abraham Lishinsky	1941	restored in 1999; on display at the South Carolina State Museum in Columbia	
