= Olar, South Carolina =

- Town
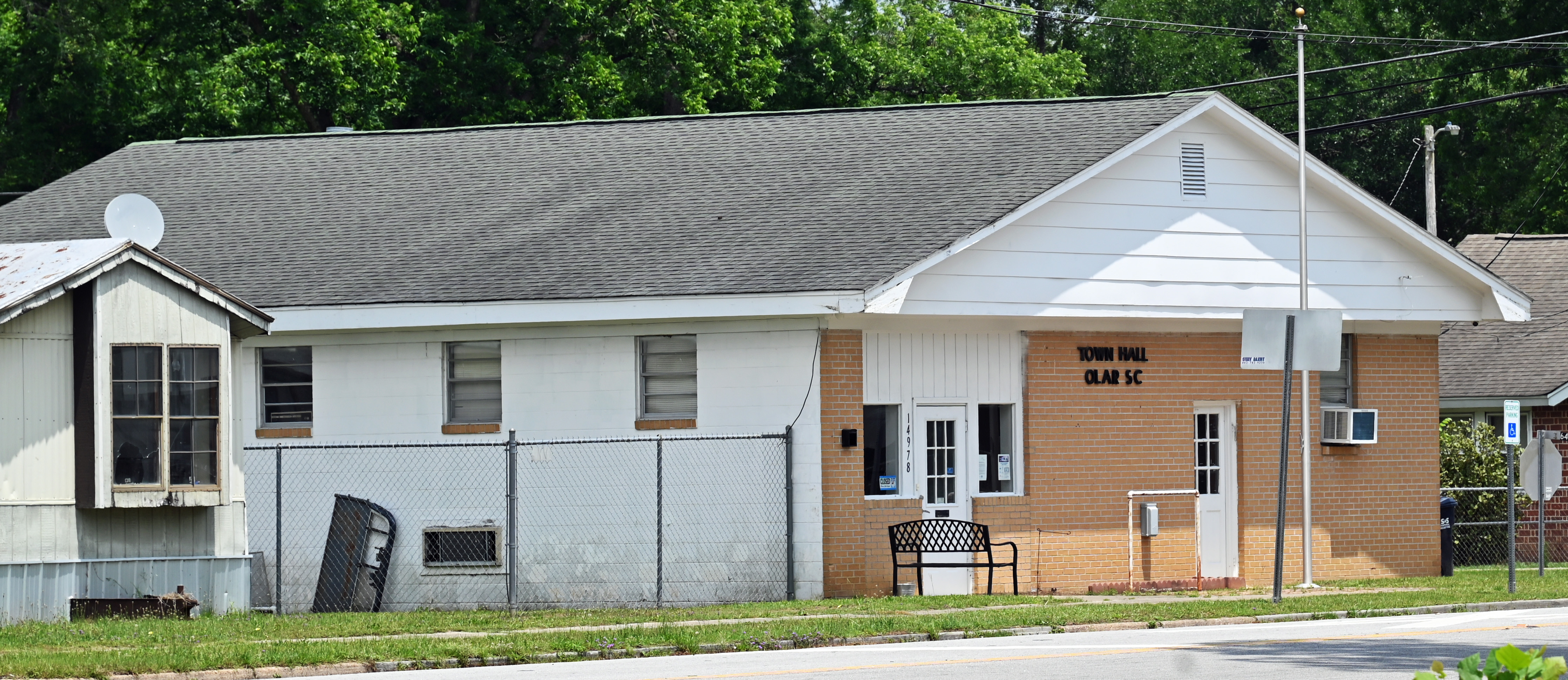
- Town Hall

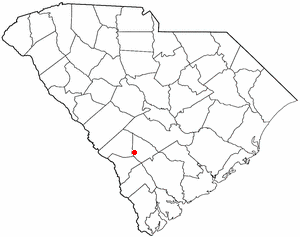
- Location of Olar, South Carolina
- Coordinates: 33°10′49″N 81°11′3″W
- Country: United States
- State: South Carolina
- County: Bamberg

Area
  - Total: 0.78 sq mi (2.03 km^{2})
  - Land: 0.78 sq mi (2.03 km^{2})
  - Water: 0 sq mi (0.00 km^{2})
- Elevation: 203 ft (62 m)

Population (2020)
  - Total: 215
  - Density: 274/sq mi (105.7/km^{2})
- Time zone: UTC-5 (Eastern (EST))
  - Summer (DST): UTC-4 (EDT)
- ZIP code: 29843
- Area codes: 803, 839
- FIPS code: 45-52585
- GNIS feature ID: 1249948

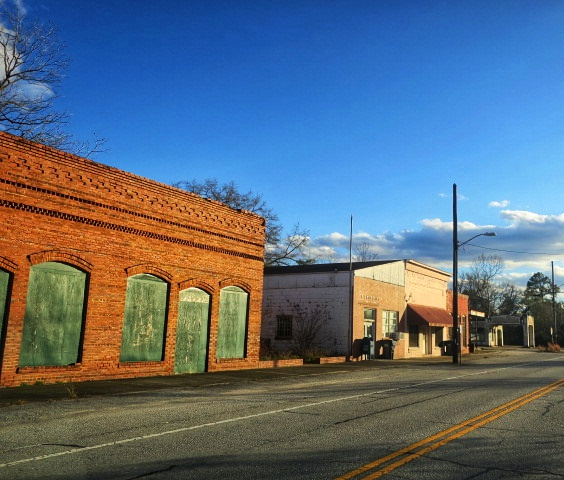
Buildings in Olar

Olar is a town in Bamberg County, South Carolina, United States. As of the 2020 census, Olar had a population of 215.

== History ==
The Mizpah Methodist Church was listed on the National Register of Historic Places in 2000.

== Geography ==
Olar is located in western Bamberg County at 33°10′49″N 81°11′3″W (33.180266, -81.184248). U.S. Route 321 passes through the town, leading north 10 miles (16 km) to Denmark and south 16 miles (26 km) to Fairfax. South Carolina Highway 64 crosses US 321 in the center of town, leading southeast 12 miles (19 km) to Ehrhardt and northwest 12 miles (19 km) to Barnwell.

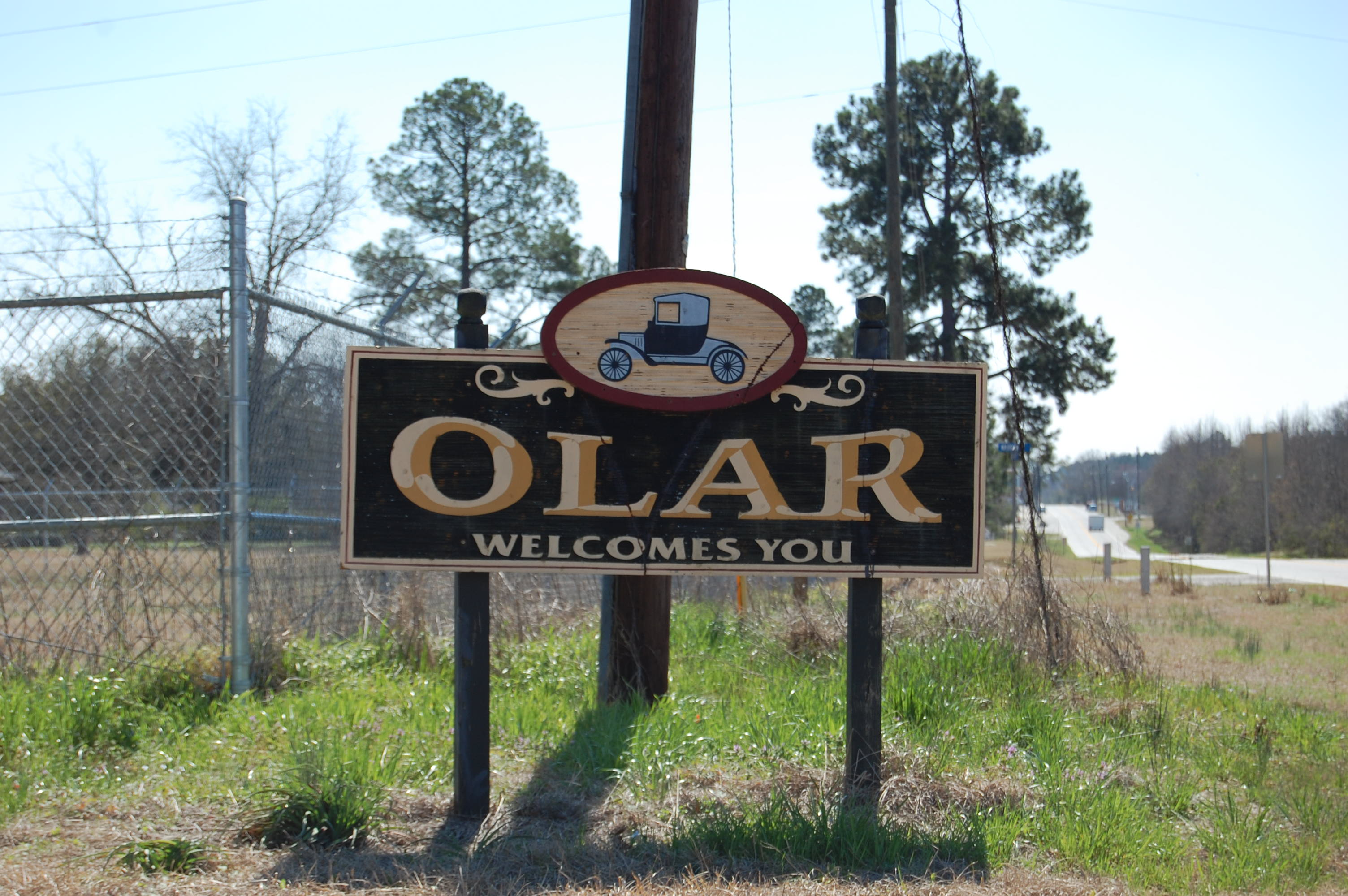
Sign welcoming visitors to Olar

According to the United States Census Bureau, Olar has a total area of 0.77 square miles (2.0 km^{2}), all of it land.

== Demographics ==
Historical population
Census	Pop.	Note	%±
1900	196		—
1910	350		78.6%
1920	500		42.9%
1930	540		8.0%
1940	528		−2.2%
1950	414		−21.6%
1960	467		12.8%
1970	423		−9.4%
1980	381		−9.9%
1990	391		2.6%
2000	237		−39.4%
2010	257		8.4%
2020	215		−16.3%
U.S. Decennial Census

The census of 2000, there were 237 people, 111 households, and 71 families residing in the town. The population density was 301.1 inhabitants per square mile (116.3/km^{2}). There were 152 housing units at an average density of 193.1 per square mile (74.6/km^{2}). The racial makeup of the town was 52.74% White, 46.41% African American, 0.42% Native American and 0.42% Asian. Hispanic or Latino of any race were 0.42% of the population.

There were 111 households, out of which 12.6% had children under the age of 18 living with them, 51.4% were married couples living together, 9.9% had a female householder with no husband present, and 36.0% were non-families. 34.2% of all households were made up of individuals, and 17.1% had someone living alone who was 65 years of age or older. The average household size was 2.14 and the average family size was 2.70.

In the town, the population was spread out, with 12.2% under the age of 18, 9.3% from 18 to 24, 24.1% from 25 to 44, 28.3% from 45 to 64, and 26.2% who were 65 years of age or older. The median age was 49 years. For every 100 females, there were 79.5 males. For every 100 females age 18 and over, there were 80.9 males.

The median income for a household in the town was $31,250, and the median income for a family was $41,964. Males had a median income of $41,250 versus $11,771 for females. The per capita income for the town was $17,113. About 7.7% of families and 10.3% of the population were below the poverty line, including none of those under the age of eighteen and 9.5% of those 65 or over.

== Education ==
Since 2022 it is a part of the Bamberg County School District. Prior to 2022, it was in the Bamberg School District Two. The public high school is Denmark-Olar High School.

== Notable people ==
- Dave Dickerson - Basketball coach
