= BCSD =

BCSD may refer to:

- Bamberg County School District
- Beaufort County School District
- Blaine County School District
- BCSD, the Kolkata Metro station code for Bengal Chemical metro station, West Bengal, India
