= Bamberg School District One =

School district in South Carolina, United States

Location
- Bamberg, South Carolina; United States

Other information
- Website: bamberg1.schoolinsites.com

Bamberg School District One (BSD1) was a school district headquartered in Bamberg, South Carolina, United States.

It covered the eastern portion of the county, including Bamberg and Ehrhardt.

== History ==
Phyllis Schwarting was the superintendent until 2020.

Around 2019, the state government of South Carolina offered money to small school districts willing to consolidate. A belief in these districts was that the state government could at some point force a consolidation and not give additional money to the forcibly merged districts. This prompted the merger of the Bamberg County districts. In 2022 it merged with Bamberg School District Two to form Bamberg County School District.

== Schools ==
- Richard Carroll Elementary School:
  - Previously Carroll Elementary had two campuses, A and B.
- Bamberg-Ehrhardt Middle School
- Bamberg-Ehrhardt High School

The district previously operated Ehrhardt Elementary School. In 2008, the Bamberg School District One sought to close Ehrhardt Elementary. Area residents considered filing a lawsuit and attempting to convert the school into a charter school.
