= Bamberg-Ehrhardt High School =

Location
- 267 Red Raider Drive; Bamberg, South Carolina 29003; United States
- Coordinates: 33°18′16″N 81°01′41″W

Information
- Type: Public
- School district: Bamberg County School District (2022–); Bamberg School District One (–2022)
- Superintendent: Dottie Brown
- CEEB code: 410085
- Principal: Dennis R. Ulmer Jr.
- Teaching staff: 29.00 (FTE)
- Grades: 9–12
- Gender: Co-educational
- Enrollment: 354 (2023–2024)
- Student to teacher ratio: 12.21
- Schedule: 4-period block schedule
- Colors: Maroon, white, and black
- Nickname: Red Raiders
- Feeder schools: Bamberg Ehrhardt Middle School
- Website: behs.bambergschools.org

Bamberg-Ehrhardt High School is a senior high school in Bamberg, South Carolina.

Since 2022 it is a part of the Bamberg County School District, which includes all of Bamberg County. Prior to 2022, it was a part of Bamberg School District One, which included Bamberg and Ehrhardt.

== Athletics ==
=== State championships ===
- Baseball: 1974, 1975, 1976, 1977, 1978, 1979, 1980, 1981, 1986, 1992, 1994, 1995, 2007, 2008, 2009
- Basketball (boys): 1971
- Football: 1990, 2025
- Golf (boys): 1977, 1990, 2005
- Softball: 2022
- Wrestling: 2011, 2012, 2013, 2018, 2019, 2020

== Notable alumni ==
- Zack Godley, professional baseball player
- Rodney Wallace, professional mixed martial artist
- Mookie Wilson, professional baseball player
- Preston Wilson, professional baseball player
