= Ehrhardt, South Carolina =

- Town
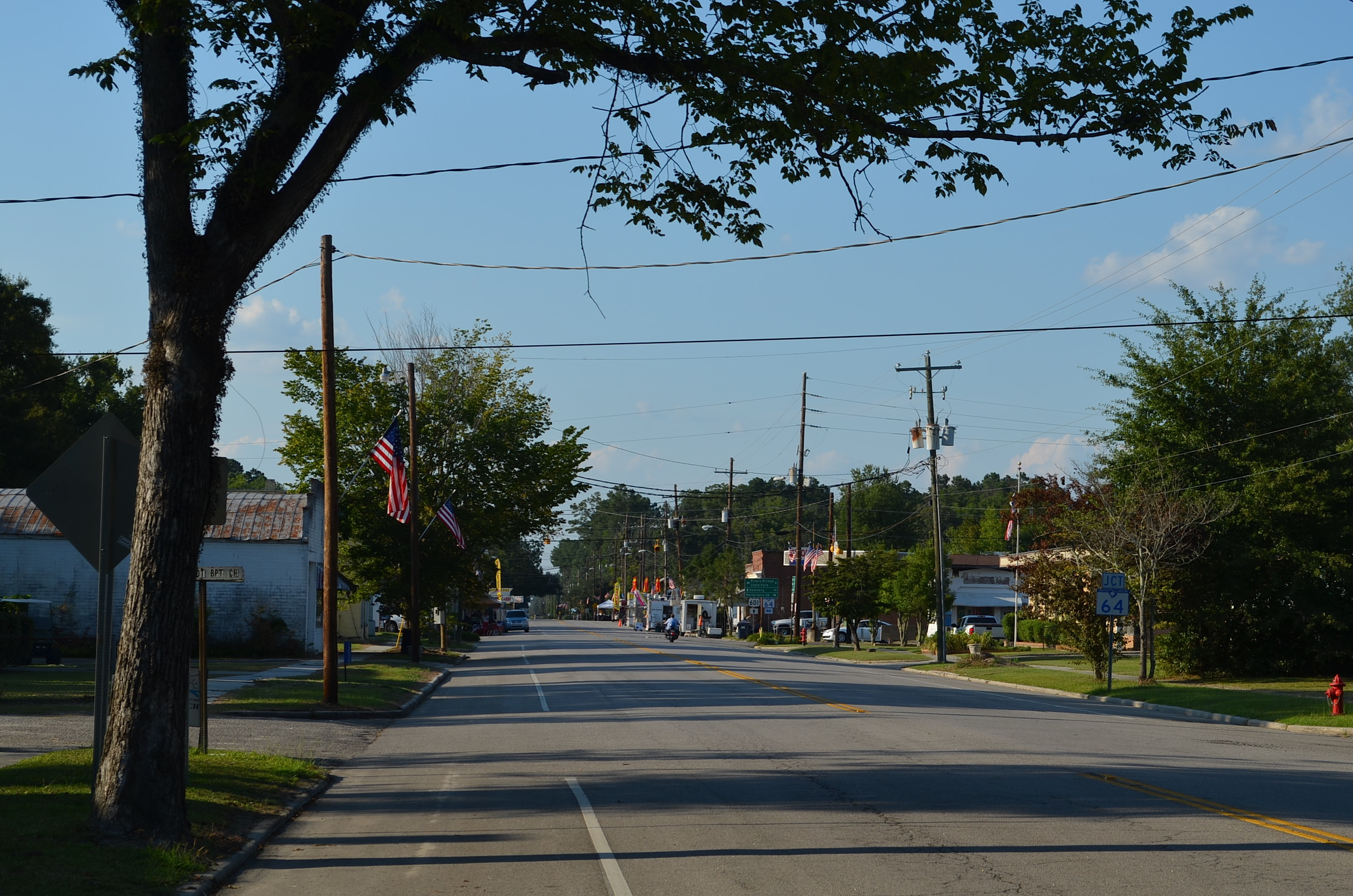

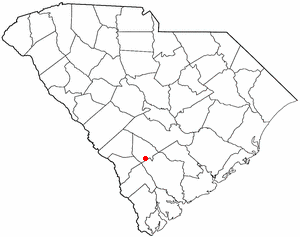
- Location of Ehrhardt, South Carolina
- Coordinates: 33°5′45″N 81°0′48″W
- Country: United States
- State: South Carolina
- County: Bamberg
- Chartered (town): 1898

Government
  - Type: Mayor-Council
  - Mayor: William Stanley

Area
  - Total: 3.11 sq mi (8.06 km^{2})
  - Land: 3.11 sq mi (8.06 km^{2})
  - Water: 0 sq mi (0.00 km^{2})
- Elevation: 141 ft (43 m)

Population (2020)
  - Total: 457
  - Density: 146.9/sq mi (56.71/km^{2})
- Time zone: UTC-5 (Eastern (EST))
  - Summer (DST): UTC-4 (EDT)
- ZIP code: 29081
- Area codes: 803, 839
- FIPS code: 45-23200
- GNIS feature ID: 1222249
- Website: ehrhardtsc.com

Ehrhardt is a town in Bamberg County, South Carolina, United States. As of the 2020 census, Ehrhardt had a population of 457.

== History ==
Ehrhardt was named for Conrad Ehrhardt (1832-1908), a German emigrant to South Carolina and successful saw mill operator, who was also the progenitor of a prominent local family of that name.

The Copeland House and Rivers Bridge State Park are listed on the National Register of Historic Places.

== Geography ==
Ehrhardt is located in southern Bamberg County at 33°5′45″N 81°0′48″W (33.095899, -81.013226). U.S. Route 601 runs through the town, leading north 14 miles (23 km) to Bamberg, the county seat, and south 17 miles (27 km) to Hampton. South Carolina Highway 64 crosses US 601 in Ehrhardt, leading southeast 26 miles (42 km) to Walterboro and northwest 24 miles (39 km) to Barnwell.

According to the United States Census Bureau, Ehrhardt has a total area of 3.1 square miles (8.1 km^{2}), all of it land.

== Demographics ==
Historical population
Census	Pop.	Note	%±
1900	215		—
1910	315		46.5%
1920	495		57.1%
1930	432		−12.7%
1940	407		−5.8%
1950	510		25.3%
1960	482		−5.5%
1970	478		−0.8%
1980	353		−26.2%
1990	442		25.2%
2000	614		38.9%
2010	545		−11.2%
2020	457		−16.1%
U.S. Decennial Census

=== 2020 census ===
Ehrhardt town, South Carolina – Racial and ethnic composition Note: the US Census treats Hispanic/Latino as an ethnic category. This table excludes Latinos from the racial categories and assigns them to a separate category. Hispanics/Latinos may be of any race.
Race / Ethnicity (NH = Non-Hispanic)	Pop 2000	Pop 2010	Pop 2020	% 2000	% 2010	% 2020
White alone (NH)	242	255	236	39.41%	46.79%	51.64%
Black or African American alone (NH)	348	269	191	56.68%	49.36%	41.79%
Native American or Alaska Native alone (NH)	0	2	0	0.00%	0.37%	0.00%
Asian alone (NH)	0	4	6	0.00%	0.73%	1.31%
Native Hawaiian or Pacific Islander alone (NH)	0	0	0	0.00%	0.00%	0.00%
Other race alone (NH)	0	0	0	0.00%	0.00%	0.00%
Mixed race or Multiracial (NH)	7	4	11	1.14%	0.73%	2.41%
Hispanic or Latino (any race)	17	11	13	2.77%	2.02%	2.84%
Total	614	545	457	100.00%	100.00%	100.00%

=== 2000 census ===
As of the census of 2000, there were 614 people, 253 households, and 154 families residing in the town. The population density was 193.1 inhabitants per square mile (74.6/km^{2}). There were 317 housing units at an average density of 99.7 per square mile (38.5/km^{2}). The racial makeup of the town was 40.07% White, 56.84% African American, 1.95% from other races, and 1.14% from two or more races. Hispanic or Latino of any race were 2.77% of the population.

There were 253 households, out of which 23.3% had children under the age of 18 living with them, 42.3% were married couples living together, 15.0% had a female householder with no husband present, and 39.1% were non-families. 36.0% of all households were made up of individuals, and 17.0% had someone living alone who was 65 years of age or older. The average household size was 2.40 and the average family size was 3.15.

In the town, the population was spread out, with 24.1% under the age of 18, 5.9% from 18 to 24, 21.2% from 25 to 44, 30.1% from 45 to 64, and 18.7% who were 65 years of age or older. The median age was 44 years. For every 100 females, there were 76.9 males. For every 100 females age 18 and over, there were 76.5 males.

The median income for a household in the town was $22,813, and the median income for a family was $41,250. Males had a median income of $31,875 versus $21,250 for females. The per capita income for the town was $15,874. About 17.0% of families and 22.7% of the population were below the poverty line, including 27.6% of those under age 18 and 23.0% of those age 65 or over.

== Education ==
Since 2022 it is a part of the Bamberg County School District. Prior to 2022, it was in the Bamberg School District One. The public high school is Bamberg-Ehrhardt High School.

Bamberg 1 formerly operated Ehrhardt Elementary School. In 2008 the Bamberg 1 district sought to close Ehrhardt Elementary. Area residents considered filing a lawsuit and attempting to convert the school into a charter school. The former elementary school became the town hall.

== Schützenfest ==
The Schützenfest commemorates the town's rich German heritage and their German founder, Conrad Ehrhardt, an immigrant from Weiterode, Kurhessen, Germany. The festival is held annually.
