= Woodlands (Bamberg, South Carolina) =

Historic house in South Carolina, United States

- U.S. National Register of Historic Places
- U.S. National Historic Landmark
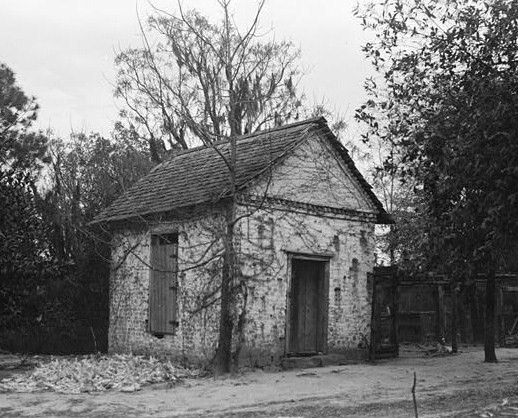
- The Study, an outbuilding at Woodlands

- Location within South Carolina Location within the United States
- Nearest city: Bamberg, South Carolina
- Coordinates: 33°17′27.0594″N 80°55′52.575″W
- Area: 650 acres (260 ha)
- Built: 1836
- NRHP reference No.: 71000742

Significant dates
- Added to NRHP: November 11, 1971
- Designated NHL: November 11, 1971

Woodlands, or the William Gilmore Simms Estate, is a historic plantation estate in Bamberg County, South Carolina. The property is nationally notable as the home for many years of author William Gilmore Simms (1806-1870), considered one of the leading literary voices of the antebellum Southern United States, and was designated a National Historic Landmark in 1971. The main house, built in part by Simms, contains mementos from his period.

== Description and history ==
The Woodlands estate is located 3 miles (4.8 km) east of Bamberg on both sides of U.S. Highway 78, on the south bank of the south branch of the Edisto River. The main estate house is a two-story structure, brick on the first floor and wood frame on the second. Its main facade is five bays across, with asymmetrical window and door placement. The estate has two outbuildings from the 1860s: a small cabin that was used by William Gilmore Simms as a study, and a small dairy house.

The estate was already of some age when William Gilmore Simms inherited it from his in-laws in 1836. It was for many years his primary residence, where many of his most significant works were written. The main estate house was rebuilt several times, once after a fire, and again after its destruction by Union Army forces late in the American Civil War. Simms was not able to fully rebuild the main house, and only completed the library wing in 1867, which forms the first floor of the current main house.

A documentary was made about the enslaved population at the Woodlands plantation.

== See also ==
- List of National Historic Landmarks in South Carolina
- National Register of Historic Places listings in Bamberg County, South Carolina
