= Battle of Rivers' Bridge =

Battle of the American Civil War

- Part of the American Civil War
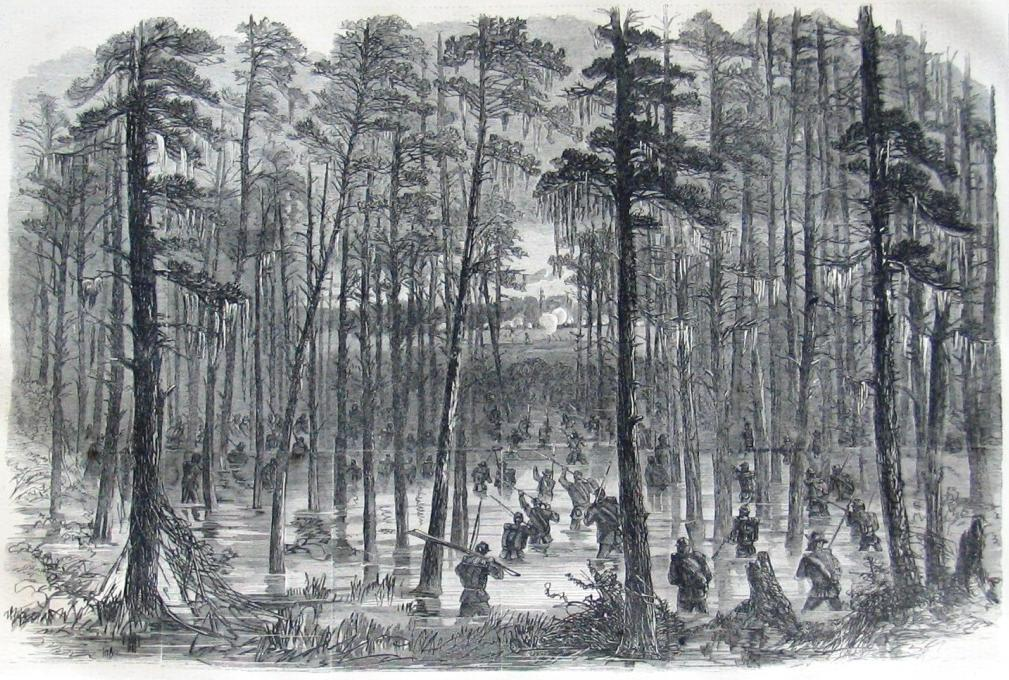
- Charge of Weaver's Brigade Across the Salkehatchie
Date	February 3, 1865
Location	Bamberg County, South Carolina 33°3′10″N 81°5′59″W
Result	Union victory

Belligerents
United States (Union)	Confederate States

Commanders and leaders
(United States) Francis P. Blair (United States) John A. Logan	(Confederate States of America) Lafayette McLaws

Units involved
XVII Corps; XV Corps	Department of South Carolina, Georgia, and Florida

Strength
5,000	1,200

Casualties and losses
124 (18 killed, 106 wounded)	97 (8 killed, 44 wounded, 45 captured/missing)
- Location within South Carolina

The Battle of Rivers' Bridge (also known as the Action at Rivers' Bridge) took place during the American Civil War on February 3, 1865.

== Order of battle ==
=== Confederate ===
Commander: Major General Lafayette McLaws

- Harrison's Brigade: Colonel George Harrison Jr.
  - 1st Georgia Regulars, Colonel Richard Wayne
  - 5th Georgia Infantry, Colonel Charles Daniel
  - 5th Georgia Reserves, Major Charles McGregor
  - 32nd Georgia Infantry, Lieutenant Colonel E. H. Bacon Jr.
  - 47th Georgia Infantry
- Kirkland's Brigade: Brigadier General William Whedbee Kirkland
  - 17th North Carolina Infantry, Captain Stuart L. Johnston
  - 42nd North Carolina Infantry, Colonel John E. Brown
  - 50th North Carolina Infantry, Colonel George Wortham
  - 66th North Carolina/10th North Carolina Battalion, Colonel John H. Nethercutt
- Logan's Brigade: Brigadier General Thomas M. Logan
  - 1st South Carolina Cavalry: Lieutenant James A. Ratchford
  - 2nd South Carolina Cavalry
  - 3rd South Carolina Cavalry: Colonel Charles J. Colcock
  - Earle's (South Carolina) Battery: Captain William Earle
- 3rd Arkansas Cavalry: Major William Blackwell

=== Union ===
- XVII Corps: Major General Francis Preston Blair Jr.
- 1st Division: Major General Joseph A. Mower
  - 1st Brigade: Brigadier General John W. Fuller
    - 64th Illinois Infantry
    - 18th Missouri Infantry
    - 27th Ohio Infantry
    - 39th Ohio Infantry
  - 2nd Brigade: Brigadier General John W. Sprague
    - 35th New Jersey Infantry
    - 43rd Ohio Infantry
    - 63rd Ohio Infantry
    - 25th Wisconsin Infantry
    - 68th Ohio Infantry
  - 3rd Brigade: Colonel Charles H. DeGroat
    - 10th Illinois Infantry
    - 25th Indiana Infantry
    - 32nd Wisconsin Infantry
- 4th Division: Brevet Major General Giles Alexander Smith
  - 1st Brigade: Brigadier General Benjamin F. Potts
    - 14/15th Illinois Infantry
    - 53rd Illinois Infantry
    - 23rd Indiana Infantry
    - 53rd Indiana Infantry
    - 32nd Ohio Infantry

Work in progress

== Engagement ==
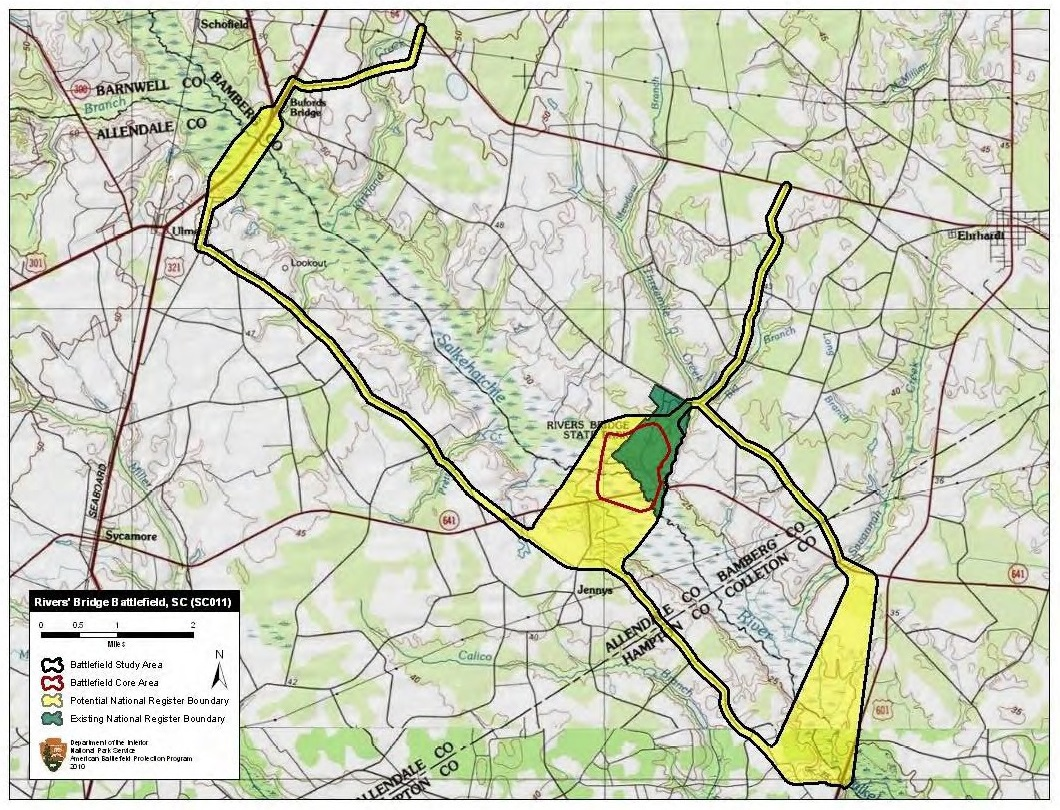
Map of Rivers' Bridge Battlefield core and study areas by the American Battlefield Protection Program.

While Maj. Gen. William T. Sherman's Union armies marched north across South Carolina, about 1,200 Confederates under Maj. Gen. Lafayette McLaws were posted at the crossing on the Salkehatchie River. Union soldiers began to build bridges to bypass McLaws on February 2. The next day two brigades under Maj. Gen. Francis P. Blair waded through the swamp and flanked the Confederates. McLaws withdrew toward Branchville after stalling Sherman's advance for only one day and Sherman's forces continued moving north towards the state capital Columbia.

== Mass grave ==
In 1876 men from nearby communities reburied the Confederate dead from Rivers Bridge in a mass grave about a mile from the battlefield and began a tradition of annually commemorating the battle. The Rivers Bridge Memorial Association eventually obtained the battlefield and in 1945 turned the site over to South Carolina for a state park. The site is commemorated by the Rivers Bridge State Historic Site.

== Battlefield condition ==
Earthworks used by the Confederate defenders are preserved at the historic site. A portion of the bluff overlooking the river (upon which several Confederate earthworks were located) was significantly altered by the operations of a logging railroad that paralleled the Salkehatchie River during the late 19th century.
