= Cecil T. Sandifer =

American politician (1923–2022)

Cecil Tant Sandifer

Member of the South Carolina House of Representatives for the 1st district
- In office 1972–1980
- Preceded by: Herbert D. Morgan
- Succeeded by: Duke Cleveland

Personal details
- Born: August 18, 1923 Bamberg, South Carolina, U.S.
- Died: December 14, 2022 (aged 99) Westminster, South Carolina, U.S.
- Party: Democratic
- Occupation: funeral director

Cecil Tant Sandifer Sr. (August 18, 1923 – December 14, 2022) was an American politician in the state of South Carolina. He was in the South Carolina House of Representatives as a member of the Democratic Party from 1972 to 1980, representing Oconee County. Sandifer served in the United States Army during World War II. He was a funeral director in Westminster, South Carolina. Sandifer also served as mayor of Westminster, South Carolina. Sandifer died on December 14, 2022, at the age of 99.
