= Rivers Bridge State Historic Site =

- U.S. National Register of Historic Places
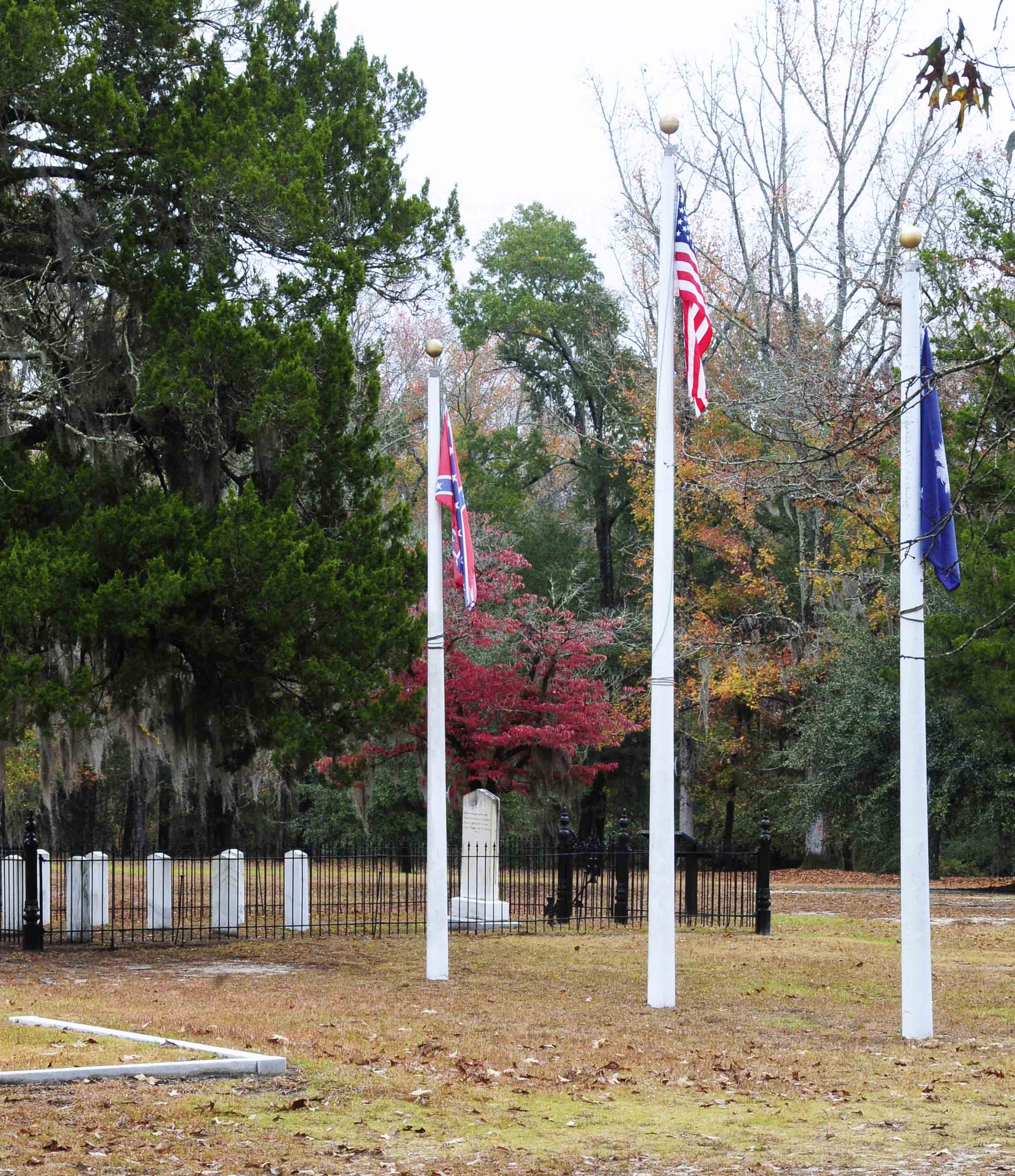

- Location within South Carolina Location within the United States
- Nearest city: Ehrhardt, South Carolina
- Coordinates: 33°03′22″N 81°05′45″W
- Area: 390 acres (160 ha)
- Built: 1865
- Architectural style: Earthen Breastworks
- NRHP reference No.: 72001187
- Added to NRHP: February 23, 1972

Rivers Bridge State Historic Site, also known as Rivers Bridge State Park, located near Ehrhardt, a small town in Bamberg County, South Carolina, is the site of an important Civil War battle. It is in this area that General William T. Sherman engaged the Confederate Army on his advance from Savannah, and after two days of battle, outflanked the Confederates and forced them to withdraw. River Bridge State Park was listed in the National Register of Historic Places on February 23, 1972.

== Mass grave ==
In 1876 men from nearby communities reburied the Confederate dead from Rivers Bridge in a mass grave about a mile from the battlefield and began a tradition of annually commemorating the battle. The Rivers Bridge Memorial Association eventually obtained the battlefield and in 1945 turned the site over to South Carolina for a state park.

== Gallery ==
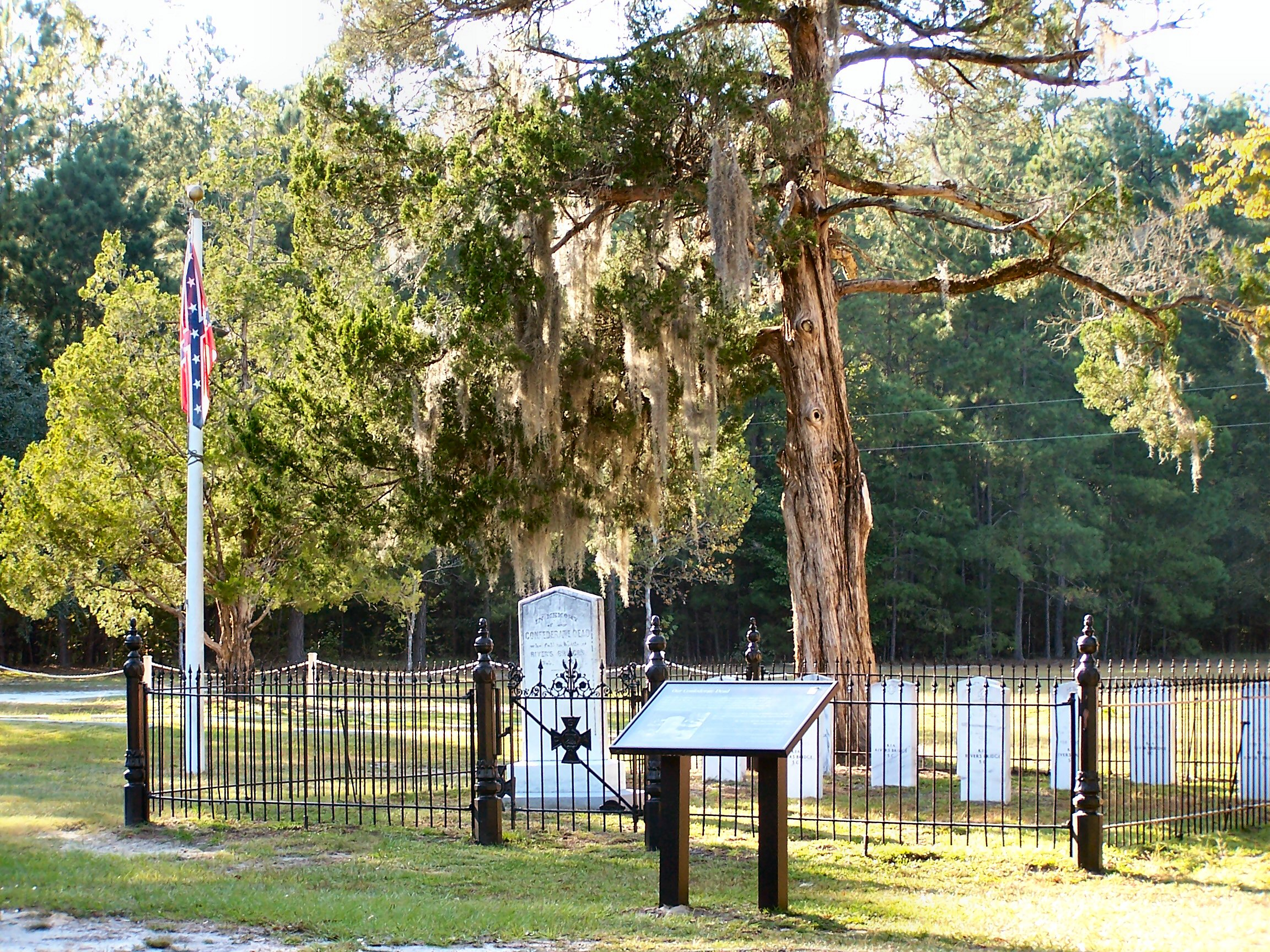
Confederate cemetery

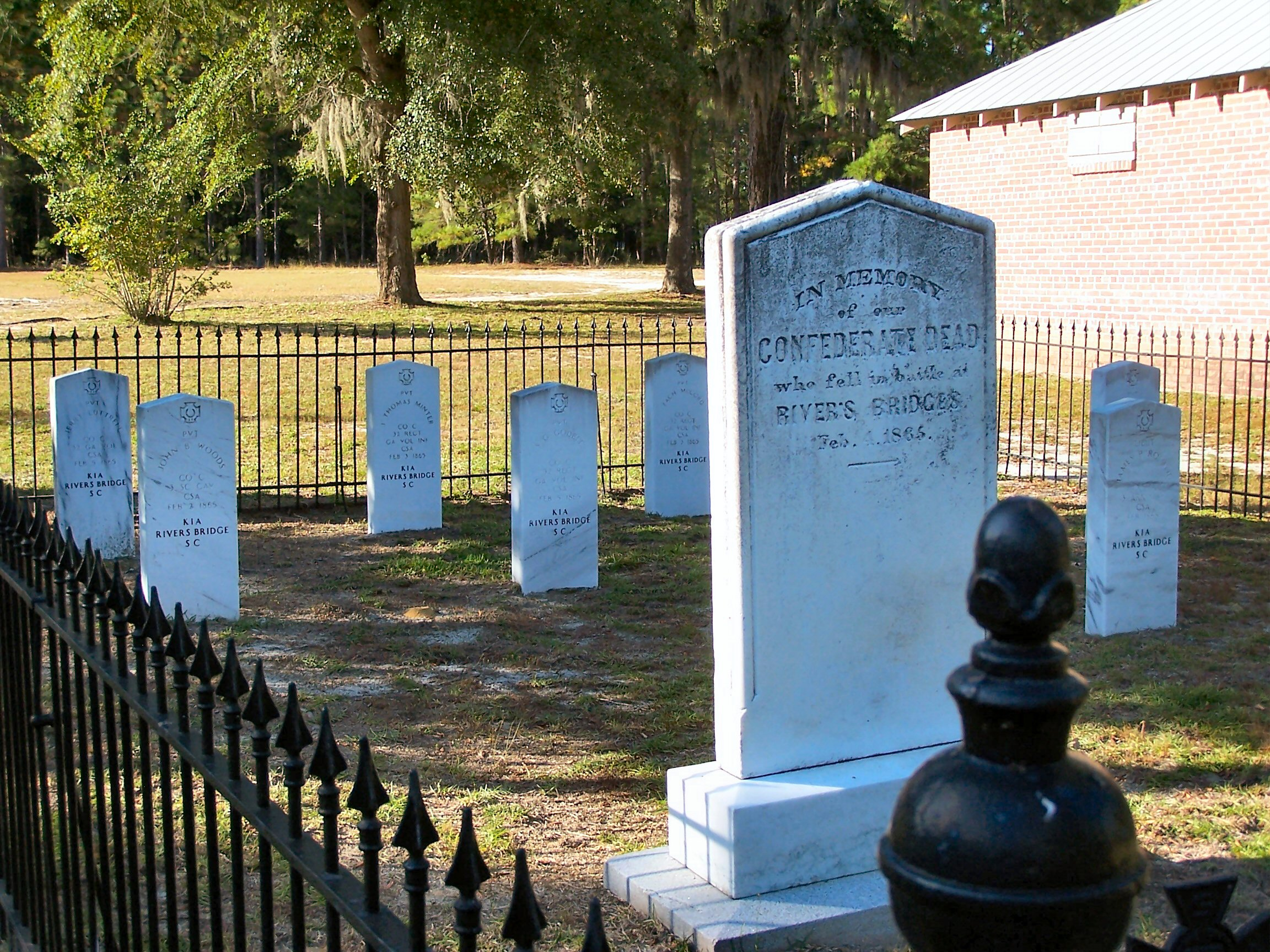
Confederate cemetery

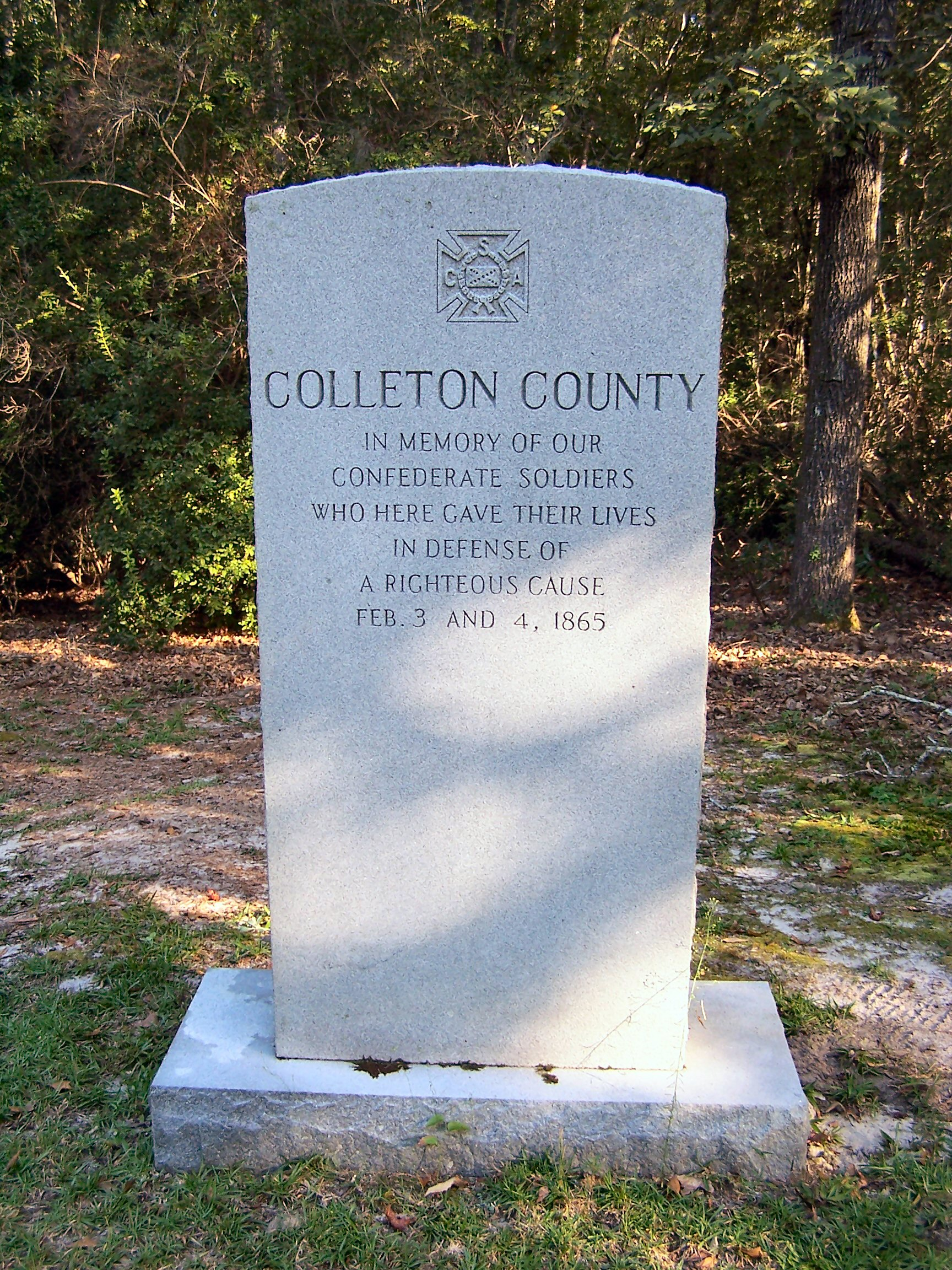
Colleton County Memorial

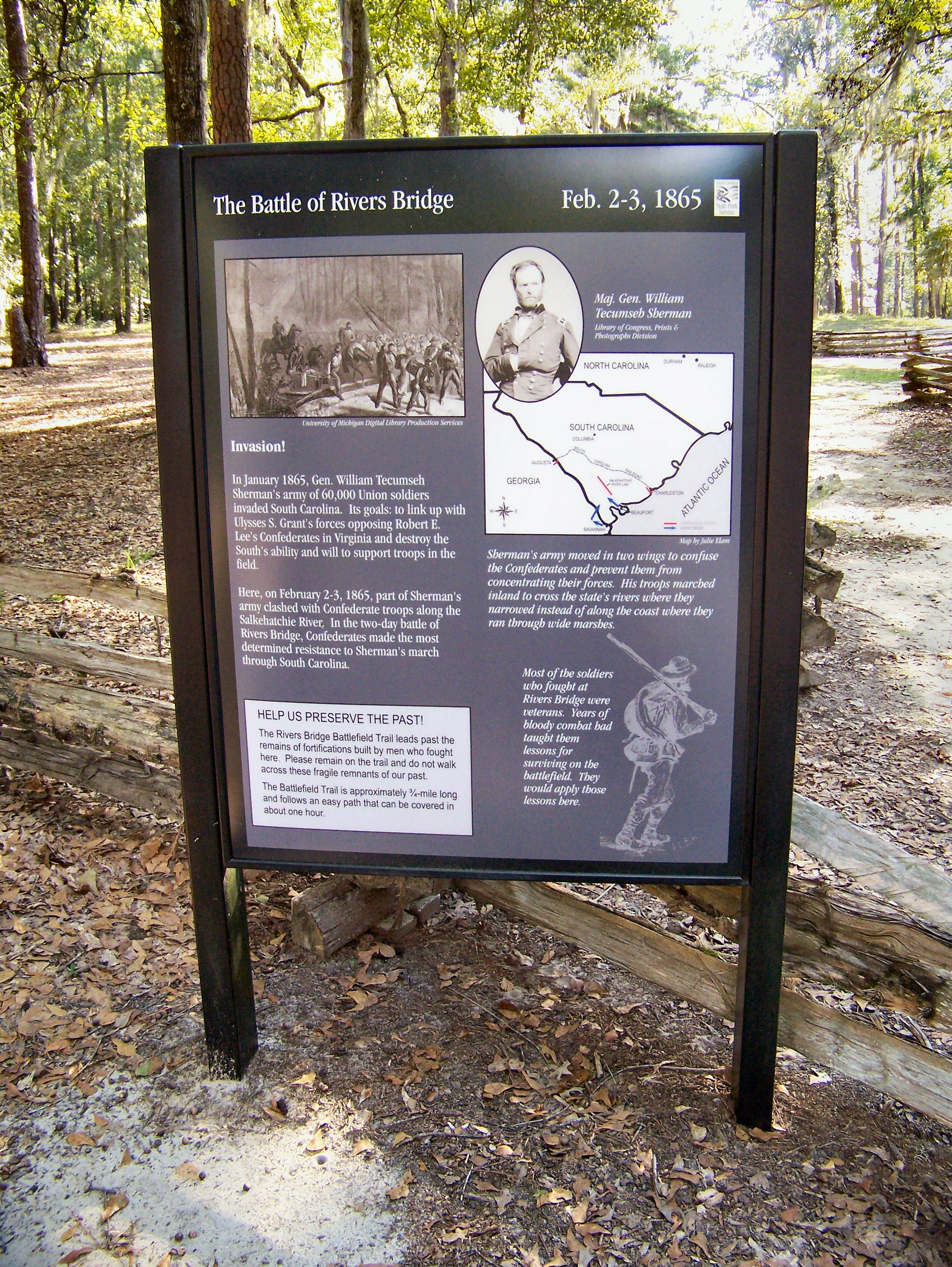
Interpretive sign
