= Gen. Francis Marion Bamberg House =

Historic house in South Carolina, United States

- U.S. National Register of Historic Places
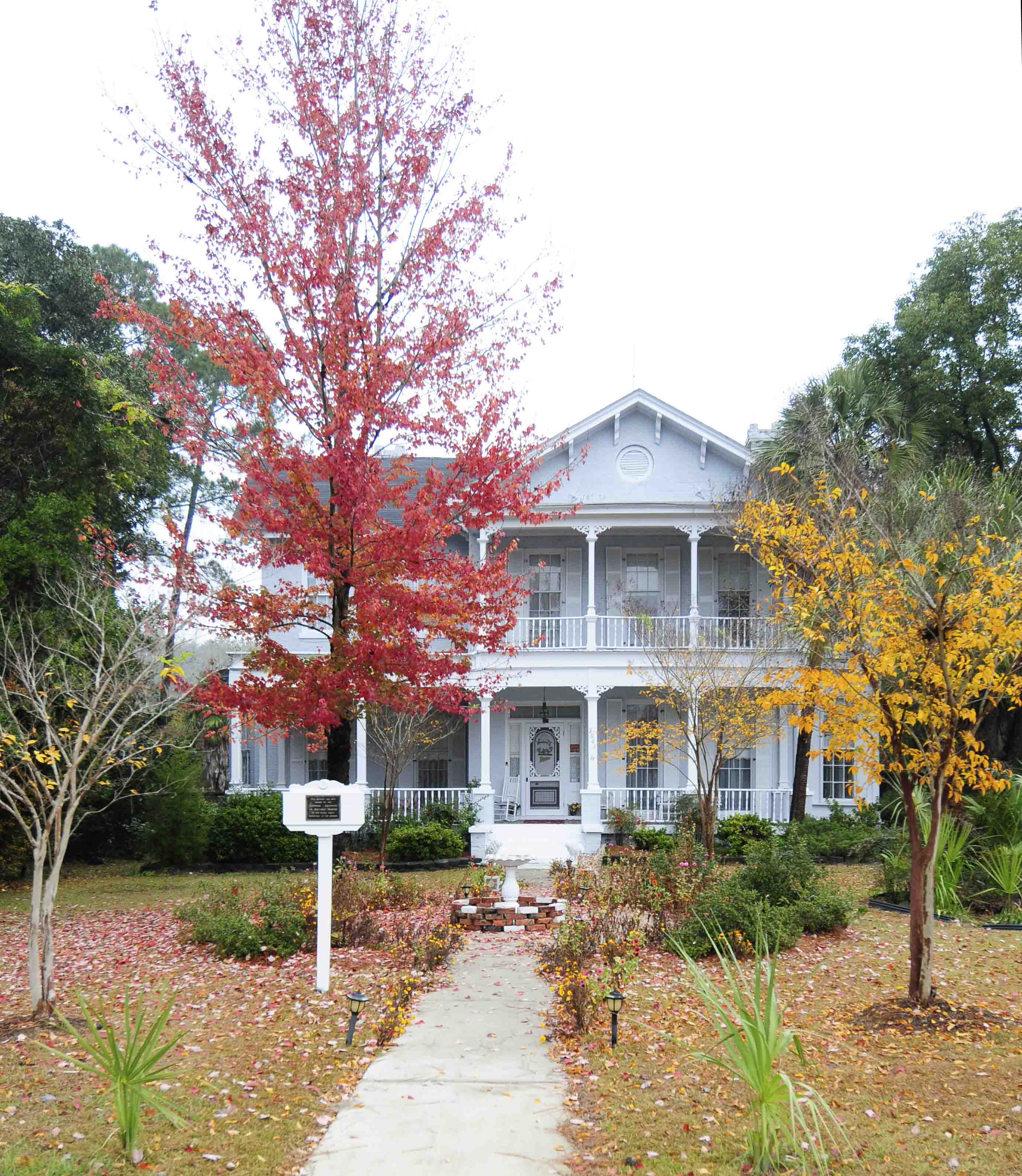

- Location within South Carolina Location within the United States
- Location: N. Railroad Ave. and N. Carlisle St., Bamberg, South Carolina
- Coordinates: 33°17′50″N 81°2′57″W
- Area: 0.8 acres (0.32 ha)
- Built: 1869
- Architectural style: Queen Anne
- NRHP reference No.: 76001692
- Added to NRHP: June 29, 1976

General Francis Marion Bamberg (1838–1905), the builder of the General Francis Marion Bamberg House, played an important role in the growth of the town and county of Bamberg, South Carolina. Among other accomplishments, General Bamberg promoted the educational, religious, economic and cultural growth of the town of Bamberg, gave a library and gymnasium to the Carlisle Fitting School, and significant sums for the construction of a Methodist church. The house, located in one of Bamberg's oldest residential areas, was listed in the National Register of Historic Places on June 29, 1976.
