= Bamberg City Hall =

- U.S. National Register of Historic Places
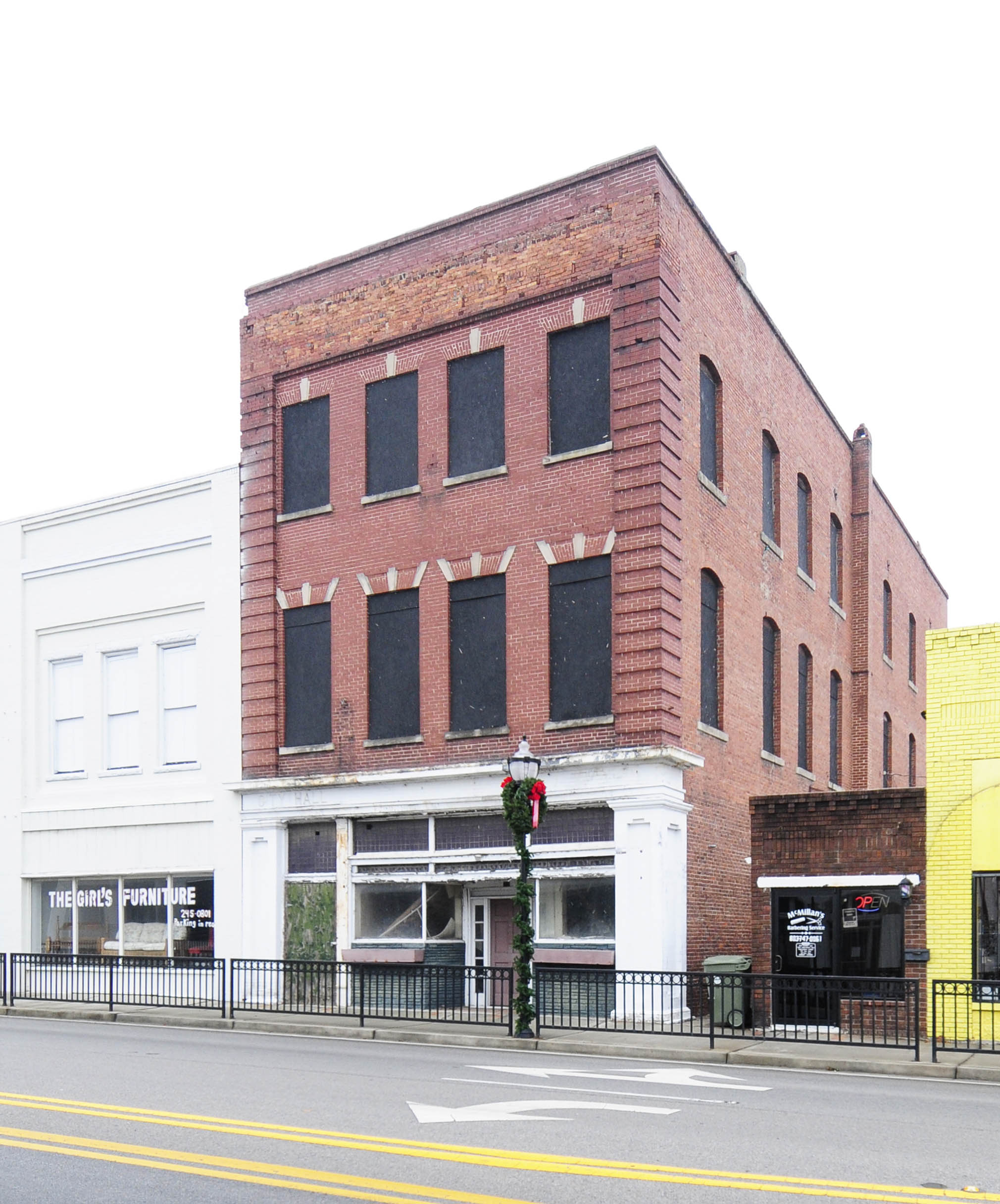

- Location within South Carolina Location within the United States
- Location: 3069 Main Hwy, Bamberg, South Carolina
- Coordinates: 33°17′47″N 81°2′7″W
- Area: less than one acre
- Built: 1909
- Architect: Sayre & Baldwin
- Architectural style: Classical Revival
- NRHP reference No.: 05001099
- Added to NRHP: September 28, 2005

Bamberg City Hall, located in Bamberg, South Carolina was a municipal city hall. It was an example of the type of early twentieth-century style of governmental building designed by the Anderson, South Carolina firm of Sayre and Baldwin. A number of architectural details of this three-story brick and cast stone building were also noteworthy. The building was listed in the National Register of Historic Places on September 28, 2004. It was destroyed by a tornado in January 2024.
