= Mizpah Methodist Church =

Historic church in South Carolina, United States

- U.S. National Register of Historic Places
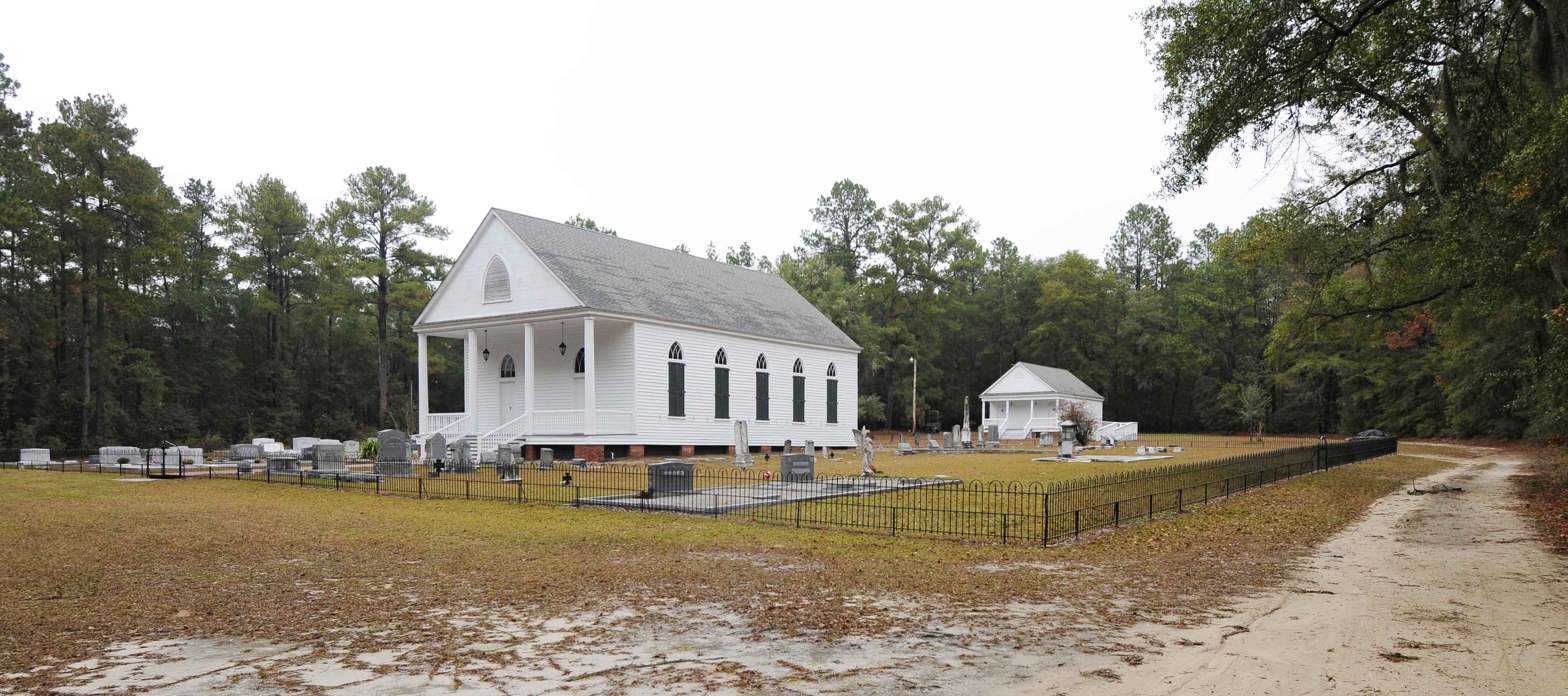
- Mizpah Methodist Church, November 2012

- Location within South Carolina Location within the United States
- Location: Junction of U.S. Route 301 and S-5-31, near Olar, South Carolina
- Coordinates: 33°7′7″N 81°10′49″W
- Area: 7.3 acres (3.0 ha)
- Built: 1856
- Architectural style: Greek Revival, Gothic Revival
- NRHP reference No.: 00001531
- Added to NRHP: December 13, 2000

Mizpah Methodist Church is a historic Methodist church located near Olar, Bamberg County, South Carolina. It was built in 1856, and is a frame church sheathed in weatherboard and includes Greek Revival and Gothic Revival architectural elements. Surrounding the church is the church cemetery, which contains gravestones and iron Maltese cross markers for a number of Confederate veterans.

It was built in 1856 and added to the National Register in 2000.
