= Bamberg Historic District =

Historic district in South Carolina, United States

- U.S. National Register of Historic Places
- U.S. Historic district
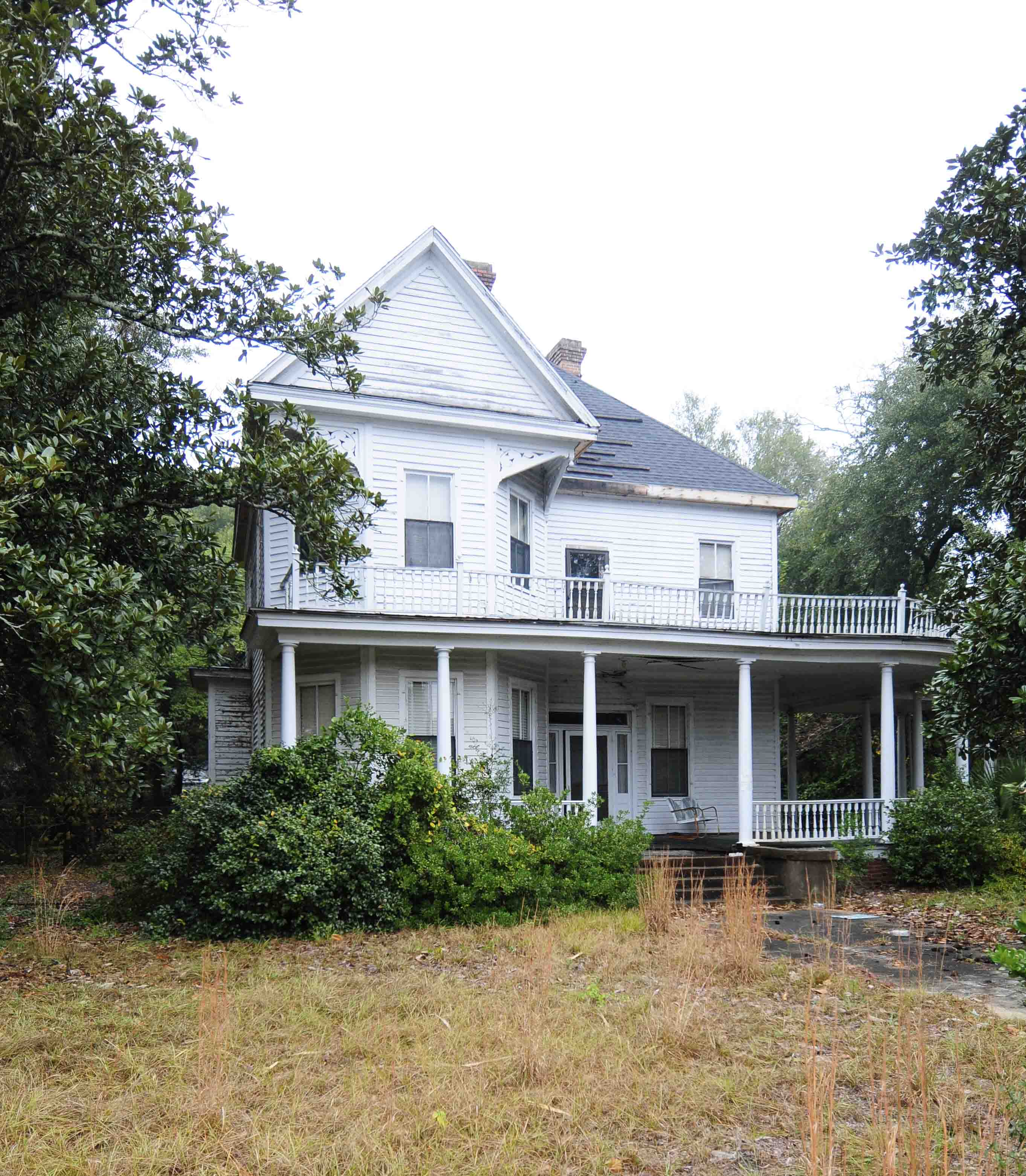

- Location within South Carolina Location within the United States
- Location: E. Railroad Ave., 2nd, Midway, Elm, Cannon, N. Carlisle, and Church Sts., Bamberg, South Carolina
- Area: 56 acres (23 ha)
- Architectural style: Late 19th And 20th Century Revivals, Late Victorian, Bungalow
- NRHP reference No.: 83002184
- Added to NRHP: May 19, 1983

The Bamberg Historic District, located in the city and county of Bamberg, South Carolina, is an important collection of over 50 mostly residential buildings. The homes were constructed from 1880 to 1930, and are representative of the residential neighborhoods of the period. A cemetery dating to 1852 is also in the district. The Bamberg Historic District was listed in the National Register of Historic Places on May 19, 1983.
