= Copeland House (Ehrhardt, South Carolina) =

Historic house in South Carolina, United States

- U.S. National Register of Historic Places
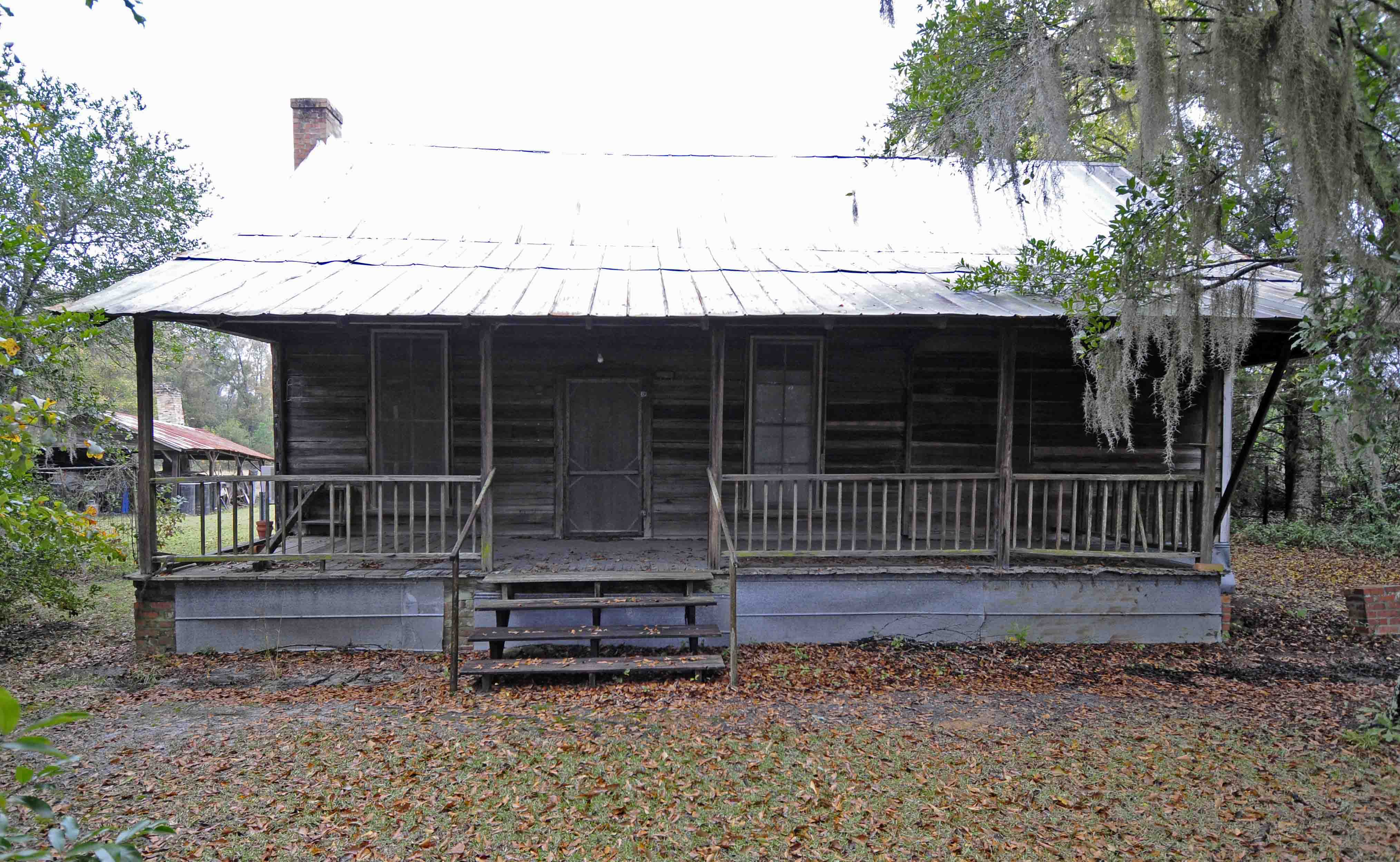

- Location within South Carolina Location within the United States
- Location: Secondary Road 389, 0.3 miles south of its junction with South Carolina Highway 64, near Ehrhardt, South Carolina
- Coordinates: 33°05′43″N 81°02′46″W
- Area: 3.8 acres (1.5 ha)
- Built: c.1796
- NRHP reference No.: 91001494
- Added to NRHP: October 18, 1991

The Copeland House is a vernacular farm residence built in the Carolina back country after 1790. It is located along what would in the early 19th century become an established coach road from the coastal counties to the interior. Constructed in the late 18th century by John Jacob Copeland (1775–1853), it became the center for his family that grew to include eight children. The house and the nearby farms, many belonging to families related by marriage over time, became significant contributors to a German Lutheran settlement in the area which took shape in this part of South Carolina a generation before the start of the American Revolution. The nearest town, Ehrhardt, South Carolina, is about 2 miles east of the Copeland House. The residence, initially built in the early 1790s, is significant for its association with the Copeland family, who built the house, occupied it continuously and farmed the surrounding property for nearly 200 years. In the mid-1980s the Copeland descendants, heirs to the fifth generation of the family, sold the property. The original square log and dovetail construction remains largely intact, even after several significant 19th and early 20th century modifications and additions were made. Subsequent owners have generally maintained the original fabric while stabilizing the structure. The house, together with several related dependencies and an adjacent Copeland family burial site, was listed in the National Register of Historic Places on October 18, 1991.
