= Cal Smoak Site =

Archaeological site in South Carolina, United States

- U.S. National Register of Historic Places
- Nearest city: Bamberg, South Carolina
- Area: 5.5 acres (2.2 ha)
- NRHP reference No.: 86000042
- Added to NRHP: January 6, 1986

The Cal Smoak Site, located in Bamberg County, South Carolina, is a precontact archaeological site that was subject to excavation and reporting in the 1970s by members of the Archaeological Society of South Carolina, with occupations spanning the Early Archaic through Mississippian periods, from ca. 11,500 to 1000 years before the present. It is situated on a ridge that overlooks the Edisto Swamp and one of its small tributaries, Brier Creek. The (restricted) area is important because it is culturally stratified to a depth of about 30 inches, with excavations and analyses demonstrating the site contains important cultural and chronological information about Native American occupations in this part of the region. A monograph published in 1979, the first Occasional Paper of the Archaeological Society of South Carolina, documents the excavations and recovered artifacts and features in detail. The site was listed in the National Register of Historic Places on January 6, 1986.
