= Bamberg, South Carolina =

- City
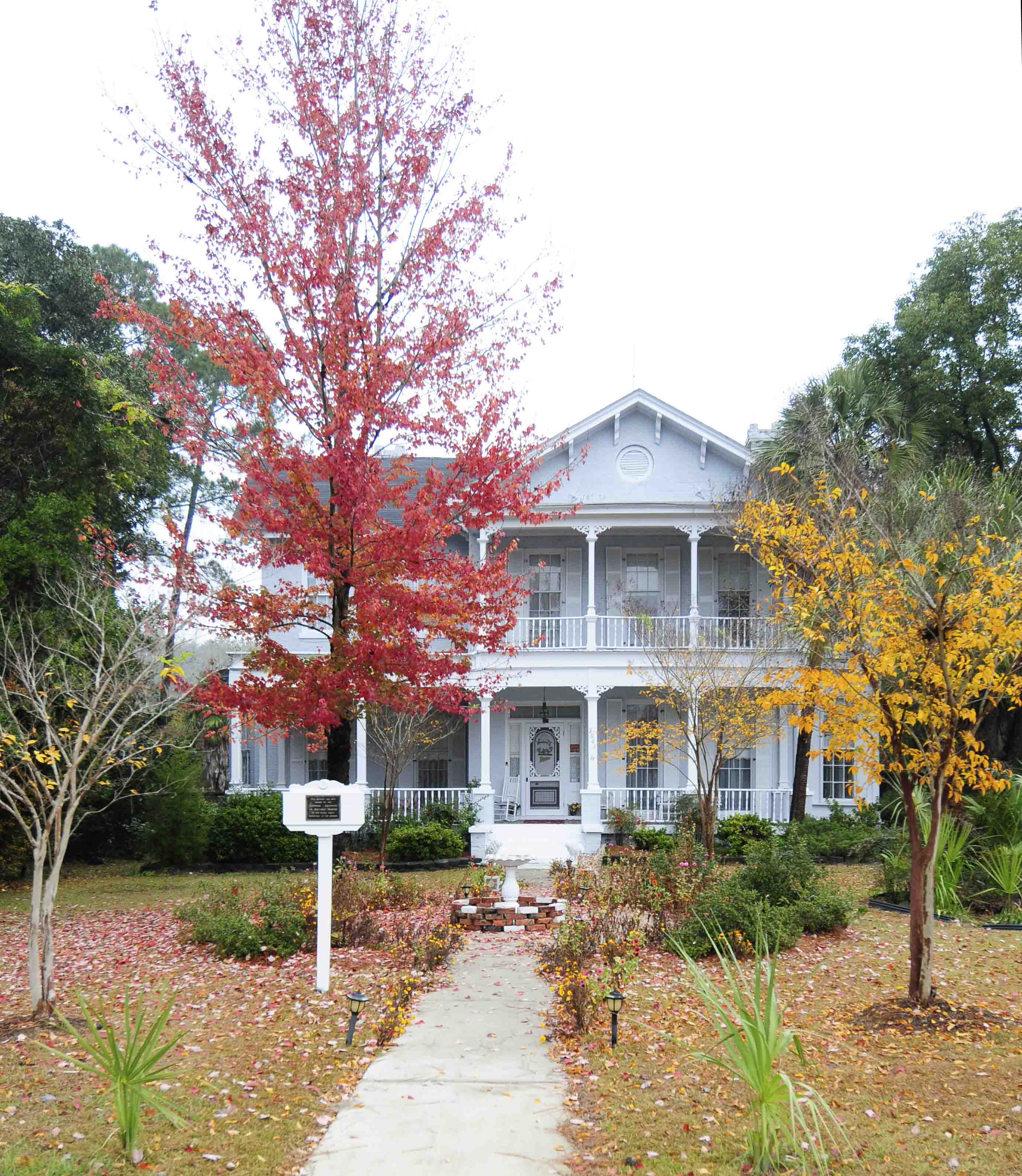
- Gen. Francis Marion Bamberg House

- Seal
- Nickname: The Berg
- Motto: "It's a great day in Bamberg County!"
- Location within South Carolina
- Coordinates: 33°17′54″N 81°1′55″W
- Country: United States
- State: South Carolina
- County: Bamberg
- Named after: William Seaborn Bamberg

Government
  - Mayor: Nancy Foster

Area
  - Total: 3.59 sq mi (9.31 km^{2})
  - Land: 3.58 sq mi (9.26 km^{2})
  - Water: 0.019 sq mi (0.05 km^{2})
- Elevation: 164 ft (50 m)

Population (2020)
  - Total: 3,076
  - Density: 860.5/sq mi (332.23/km^{2})
- Time zone: UTC-5 (Eastern (EST))
  - Summer (DST): UTC-4 (EDT)
- ZIP code: 29003
- Area codes: 803, 839
- FIPS code: 45-03790
- GNIS feature ID: 1244955
- Website: bambergsc.com

Bamberg is a city in and the county seat of Bamberg County, South Carolina, United States. The population was 3,607 at the 2010 census.

== History ==
Bamberg is named after early resident William Seaborn Bamberg. Members of the Bamberg family continue to live in the county to this day. The Bamberg City Hall, Bamberg Historic District, Bamberg Post Office, Gen. Francis Marion Bamberg House, Cal Smoak Site, and Woodlands are listed on the National Register of Historic Places.

In 2007, the main street was widened, and a series of iron railings were added to the sidewalks on the street, as part of an improvement scheme for the area. The then County Chamber of Commerce Executive Director stated "It will be a major boost to the economy for the county and downtown Bamberg." Urbanist advocates, such as Strong Towns, later attributed the use of railings blocking pedestrian street crossings as the reason why a large number of businesses on the main street later went out of business.

Several buildings on the main street were damaged by fire in 2019, and the city announced plans in 2021 to demolish these buildings and "revitalize" the area, adding green space and making the area more walkable.

An EF2 tornado heavily damaged the downtown area of Bamberg on January 9, 2024.

== Geography ==
Bamberg is located at 33°17′54″N 81°1′55″W (33.298440, −81.031903).

According to the United States Census Bureau, the city has a total area of 3.6 square miles (9.3 km^{2}), of which 0.012 square miles (0.03 km^{2}), or 0.34%, is water.

=== Major highways ===
- US 78
- US 301
- US 601
- SC 362

=== Climate ===
The climate in this area is characterized by relatively high temperatures and evenly distributed precipitation throughout the year. According to the Köppen Climate Classification system, Bamberg has a humid subtropical climate, abbreviated "Cfa" on climate maps.

Climate data for Bamberg, South Carolina (1991–2020 normals, extremes 1951–present)
Month	Jan	Feb	Mar	Apr	May	Jun	Jul	Aug	Sep	Oct	Nov	Dec	Year
Record high °F (°C)	82 (28)	85 (29)	92 (33)	95 (35)	102 (39)	108 (42)	109 (43)	107 (42)	103 (39)	99 (37)	93 (34)	82 (28)	109 (43)
Mean maximum °F (°C)	73.9 (23.3)	77.9 (25.5)	83.7 (28.7)	88.0 (31.1)	93.2 (34.0)	97.0 (36.1)	98.3 (36.8)	96.8 (36.0)	92.8 (33.8)	85.9 (29.9)	79.5 (26.4)	74.5 (23.6)	99.3 (37.4)
Mean daily maximum °F (°C)	57.5 (14.2)	61.7 (16.5)	69.3 (20.7)	76.8 (24.9)	83.4 (28.6)	88.4 (31.3)	91.2 (32.9)	89.1 (31.7)	84.1 (28.9)	75.4 (24.1)	65.4 (18.6)	59.0 (15.0)	75.1 (24.0)
Daily mean °F (°C)	47.0 (8.3)	50.3 (10.2)	57.0 (13.9)	64.3 (17.9)	71.8 (22.1)	78.2 (25.7)	81.2 (27.3)	79.8 (26.6)	74.7 (23.7)	64.9 (18.3)	54.7 (12.6)	48.9 (9.4)	64.4 (18.0)
Mean daily minimum °F (°C)	36.5 (2.5)	39.0 (3.9)	44.8 (7.1)	51.8 (11.0)	60.3 (15.7)	68.0 (20.0)	71.2 (21.8)	70.5 (21.4)	65.3 (18.5)	54.3 (12.4)	43.9 (6.6)	38.8 (3.8)	53.7 (12.1)
Mean minimum °F (°C)	19.9 (−6.7)	23.6 (−4.7)	27.7 (−2.4)	36.3 (2.4)	46.9 (8.3)	59.5 (15.3)	65.7 (18.7)	62.4 (16.9)	53.1 (11.7)	37.5 (3.1)	28.0 (−2.2)	23.5 (−4.7)	18.0 (−7.8)
Record low °F (°C)	2 (−17)	8 (−13)	10 (−12)	28 (−2)	35 (2)	48 (9)	55 (13)	54 (12)	37 (3)	24 (−4)	17 (−8)	7 (−14)	2 (−17)
Average precipitation inches (mm)	3.65 (93)	3.49 (89)	4.37 (111)	3.10 (79)	3.85 (98)	5.20 (132)	5.50 (140)	5.36 (136)	4.39 (112)	3.13 (80)	2.75 (70)	3.75 (95)	48.54 (1,235)
Average snowfall inches (cm)	0.3 (0.76)	0.0 (0.0)	0.0 (0.0)	0.0 (0.0)	0.0 (0.0)	0.0 (0.0)	0.0 (0.0)	0.0 (0.0)	0.0 (0.0)	0.0 (0.0)	0.0 (0.0)	0.0 (0.0)	0.3 (0.76)
Average precipitation days (≥ 0.01 in)	9.2	8.1	8.2	7.6	7.7	10.5	10.2	10.8	8.1	6.6	6.2	8.3	101.5
Average snowy days (≥ 0.1 in)	0.2	0.0	0.0	0.0	0.0	0.0	0.0	0.0	0.0	0.0	0.0	0.0	0.2
Source: NOAA

== Demographics ==
Historical population
Census	Pop.	Note	%±
1880	648		—
1890	696		7.4%
1900	1,533		120.3%
1910	1,937		26.4%
1920	2,210		14.1%
1930	2,450		10.9%
1940	3,000		22.4%
1950	2,954		−1.5%
1960	3,081		4.3%
1970	3,406		10.5%
1980	3,672		7.8%
1990	3,843		4.7%
2000	3,733		−2.9%
2010	3,607		−3.4%
2020	3,076		−14.7%
U.S. Decennial Census

=== 2020 census ===
Bamberg racial composition
Race	Num.	Perc.
White (non-Hispanic)	1,156	37.58%
Black or African American (non-Hispanic)	1,770	57.54%
Native American	10	0.33%
Asian	23	0.75%
Other/mixed	93	3.02%
Hispanic or Latino	24	0.78%

As of the 2020 United States census, there were 3,076 people, 1,311 households, and 684 families residing in the town.

=== 2000 census ===
As of the census of 2000, there were 3,733 people, 1,383 households, and 923 families residing in the city. The population density was 1,058.1 inhabitants per square mile (408.5/km^{2}). There were 1,537 housing units at an average density of 435.6 per square mile (168.2/km^{2}). The racial makeup of the city was 45.22% White, 53.58% African American, 0.21% Native American, 0.32% Asian, 0.11% from other races, and 0.56% from two or more races. Hispanic or Latino people of any race were 0.48% of the population.

There were 1,383 households, out of which 31.0% had children under the age of 18 living with them, 38.2% were married couples living together, 25.5% had a female householder with no husband present, and 33.2% were non-families. 30.9% of all households were made up of individuals, and 15.5% had someone living alone who was 65 years of age or older. The average household size was 2.45 and the average family size was 3.03.

In the city, the population was spread out, with 25.7% under the age of 18, 12.6% from 18 to 24, 23.4% from 25 to 44, 21.1% from 45 to 64, and 17.3% who were 65 years of age or older. The median age was 36 years. For every 100 females, there were 82.5 males. For every 100 females age 18 and over, there were 74.8 males.

The median income for a household in the city was $21,736, and the median income for a family was $28,309. Males had a median income of $38,068 versus $20,815 for females. The per capita income for the city was $13,512. About 21.4% of families and 28.3% of the population were below the poverty line, including 37.2% of those under age 18 and 18.9% of those age 65 or over.

== Education ==
Public education in Bamberg is administered by Bamberg County School District, which has included all of the county since 2022. The district operates Richard Carroll Elementary School, Bamberg-Ehrhardt Middle School and Bamberg-Ehrhardt High School.

Prior to 2022, Bamberg was in Bamberg School District One.

Bamberg has a public library, a branch of the ABBE Regional Library System.

== Notable people ==
- Justin Bamberg, state representative, and attorney in 2015 police killing of Walter Scott
- Da'Quan Bowers, former football player for Clemson University, defensive end in the NFL
- A. J. Cann, offensive lineman for the Houston Texans and former Bamberg-Ehrhardt standout
- Zack Godley, Major League baseball pitcher
- Nikki Haley, governor of South Carolina (2011–2017), U.S. ambassador to the United Nations (2017–2018), and 2024 presidential candidate
- Julius B. "Bubba" Ness, former chief justice of the South Carolina Supreme Court
- Mickey Pruitt, NFL linebacker
- Cecil T. Sandifer, funeral director and South Carolina state legislator
- Ricky Sapp, former NFL football player
- Rodney Wallace, three-time State Champion in wrestling; former UFC light heavyweight fighter and current mixed martial artist
- Nolan R. Williams (1982–2025), neuropsychiatrist who helped develop SAINT-TMS
- Mookie Wilson, Major League baseball player, 1986 World Series champion
- Preston Wilson, Major League baseball player
