= Bamberg Post Office =

- U.S. National Register of Historic Places
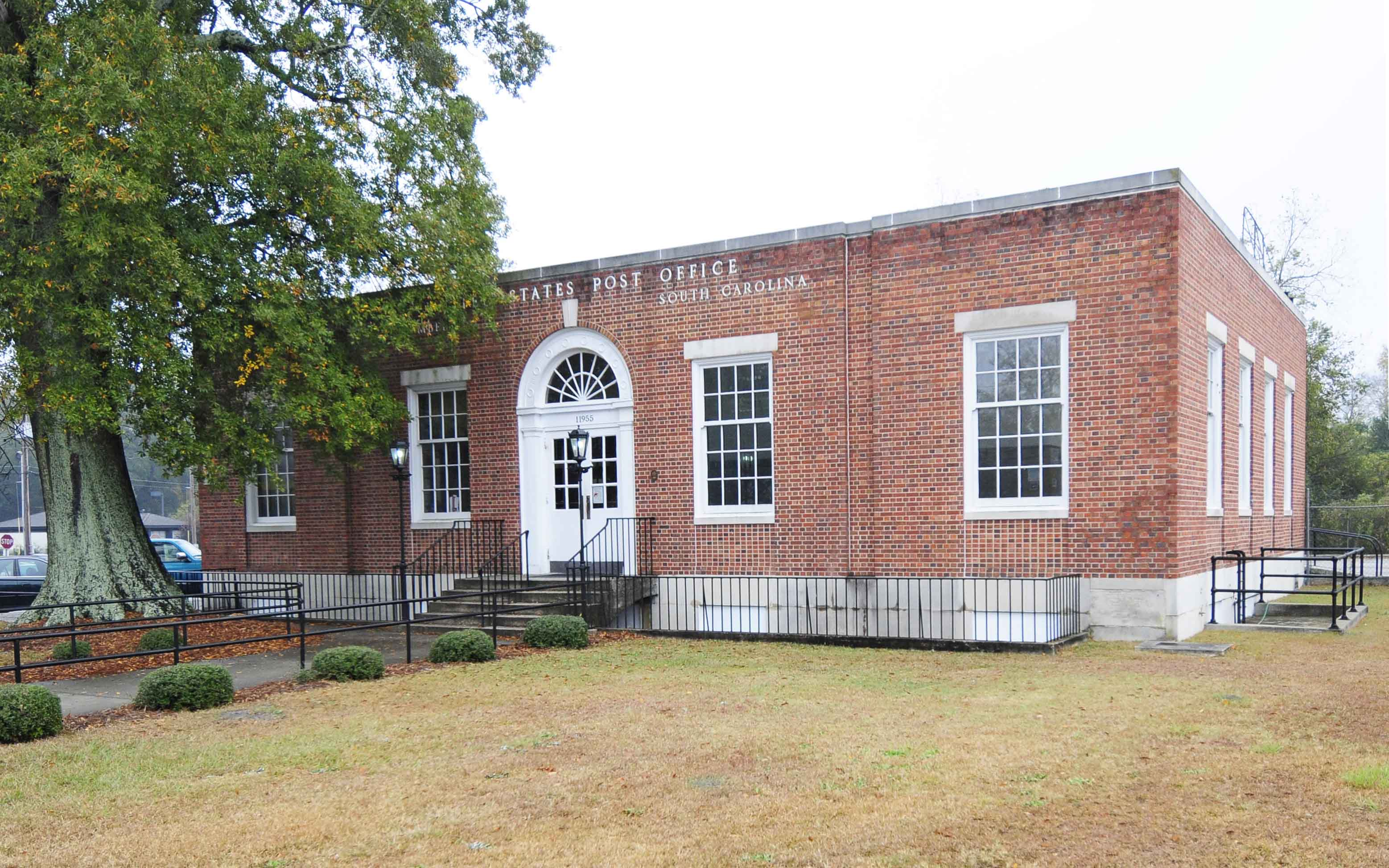

- Location within South Carolina Location within the United States
- Location: 11955 Heritage Hwy., Bamberg, South Carolina
- Coordinates: 33°17′46″N 81°2′2″W
- Area: less than one acre
- Built: 1937
- Architect: Office of the Supervising Architect under Louis A. Simon
- Architectural style: Modern Classic
- NRHP reference No.: 07000074
- Added to NRHP: May 22, 2007

The Bamberg Post Office, located in the city and county of Bamberg, South Carolina, United States, was built in 1937-38 and is significant as an example of a New Deal-era post office. The Bamberg Post Office was listed in the National Register of Historic Places on May 22, 2007.
