= Bamberg County School District =

School district in South Carolina

Address
- 62 S Holly Avenue Denmark, South Carolina; United States

District information
- Schools: 6
- NCES District ID: 4503916

Students and staff
- Students: 1767
- Teachers: 138.20 FTE

Other information
- Website: https://www.bambergschools.org/

Bamberg County School District (BCSD) is a school district headquartered in Denmark, South Carolina. It includes all of Bamberg County.

== History ==
The district was established in 2022 as a merger of Bamberg School District One and Bamberg School District Two. Circa 2019 the state government of South Carolina offered money to small school districts willing to consolidate. A belief in these districts was that the state government could at another point force a consolidation and not give additional money to the forcibly merged districts. This prompted the merger of the Bamberg County districts.

== Schools ==
High schools:

- Bamberg-Ehrhardt High School
- Denmark-Olar High School

Middle schools:

- Bamberg-Ehrhardt Middle School
- Denmark-Olar Middle School

Elementary schools:

- Richard Carroll Elementary School (Bamberg)
- Denmark-Olar Elementary School

The Denmark-Olar schools had been co-located, after an expansion of the high school campus, since circa 2019.
