= Elections in South Carolina =

Elections in South Carolina are held to fill various local, state and federal seats. Special elections may be held to fill vacancies at other points in time.

In a 2020 study, South Carolina was ranked as the 7th-hardest state for citizens to vote in, based on registration and identification requirements, and convenience provisions.

== Recent elections ==
=== 1996 elections ===
- 1996 United States presidential election in South Carolina
- 1996 United States Senate election in South Carolina
- 1996 United States House of Representatives elections in South Carolina

=== 1998 elections ===
- 1998 United States Senate election in South Carolina
- 1998 United States House of Representatives elections in South Carolina
- 1998 South Carolina gubernatorial election

=== 2000 elections ===
- 2000 United States presidential election in South Carolina
- 2000 United States House of Representatives elections in South Carolina

=== 2002 elections ===
- 2002 United States Senate election in South Carolina
- 2002 United States House of Representatives elections in South Carolina
- 2002 South Carolina gubernatorial election

=== 2004 elections ===
- 2004 United States presidential election in South Carolina
- 2004 United States Senate election in South Carolina
- 2004 United States House of Representatives elections in South Carolina

=== 2006 elections ===
- 2006 United States House of Representatives elections in South Carolina
- 2006 South Carolina gubernatorial election
- 2006 state elections

=== 2008 elections ===
- 2008 South Carolina elections
  - 2008 United States presidential election in South Carolina
    - 2008 Democratic primary
    - 2008 Republican primary
  - 2008 United States Senate election in South Carolina
  - 2008 United States House of Representatives elections in South Carolina

=== 2010 elections ===
- 2010 South Carolina elections
  - 2010 United States House of Representatives elections in South Carolina
  - 2010 United States Senate election in South Carolina
  - 2010 South Carolina gubernatorial election

=== 2012 elections ===
- 2012 South Carolina elections
  - 2012 United States presidential election in South Carolina
    - 2012 Republican primary
  - 2012 United States House of Representatives elections in South Carolina

=== 2014 elections ===
- 2014 South Carolina elections
  - 2014 United States Senate election in South Carolina
  - 2014 United States House of Representatives elections in South Carolina
  - 2014 South Carolina gubernatorial election

=== 2016 elections ===
- United States presidential election in South Carolina, 2016
  - 2016 Democratic primary
  - 2016 Republican primary
- 2016 United States Senate election in South Carolina
- 2016 United States House of Representatives elections in South Carolina

=== 2017 elections ===
- 2017 South Carolina's 5th congressional district special election

=== 2018 elections ===
- 2018 South Carolina elections
  - 2018 United States House of Representatives elections in South Carolina
  - 2018 South Carolina gubernatorial election

=== 2020 elections ===
- 2020 South Carolina elections
  - 2020 United States presidential election in South Carolina
  - 2020 United States Senate election in South Carolina
  - 2020 United States House of Representatives elections in South Carolina

=== 2022 elections ===
- 2022 South Carolina elections
  - United States Senate election in South Carolina, 2022
  - 2022 South Carolina gubernatorial election
  - 2022 United States House of Representatives elections in South Carolina

=== 2024 elections ===
- 2024 South Carolina elections
  - 2024 United States presidential election in South Carolina
  - 2024 United States House of Representatives elections in South Carolina

== Presidential elections through history ==
Historical presidential elections in South Carolina.
Election	Candidate	Party	Election winner?	Electoral Votes
1788	George Washington	None	✓	7
1792	George Washington	None	✓	8
1796	Thomas Jefferson	Democratic-Republican	✗	8
1800	Thomas Jefferson	Democratic-Republican	✓	8
1804	Thomas Jefferson	Democratic-Republican	✓	10
1808	James Madison	Democratic-Republican	✓	10
1812	James Madison	Democratic-Republican	✓	11
1816	James Monroe	Democratic-Republican	✓	11
1820	James Monroe	Democratic-Republican	✓	11
1824	Andrew Jackson	Democratic-Republican	✗	11
1828	Andrew Jackson	Democratic	✓	11
1832	John Floyd	Nullifier	✗	11
1836	Willie Mangum	Whig	✗	11
1840	Martin Van Buren	Democratic	✗	11
1844	James K. Polk	Democratic	✓	9
1848	Lewis Cass	Democratic	✗	9
1852	Franklin Pierce	Democratic	✓	8
1856	James Buchanan	Democratic	✓	8
1860	John C. Breckinridge	Democratic	✗	8
1864	United States Civil War			0
1868	Ulysses S. Grant	Republican	✓	6
1872	Ulysses S. Grant	Republican	✓	7
1876	Rutherford B. Hayes	Republican	✓	7
1880	Winfield S. Hancock	Democratic	✗	7
1884	Grover Cleveland	Democratic	✓	9
1888	Grover Cleveland	Democratic	✗	9
1892	Grover Cleveland	Democratic	✓	9
1896	William Jennings Bryan	Democratic Populist	✗	9
1900	William Jennings Bryan	Democratic Populist	✗	9
1900	Alton B. Parker	Democratic	✗	9
1908	William Jennings Bryan	Democratic	✗	9
1912	Woodrow Wilson	Democratic	✓	9
1916	Woodrow Wilson	Democratic	✓	9
1920	James M. Cox	Democratic	✗	9
1924	John W. Davis	Democratic	✗	9
1928	Alfred E. Smith	Democratic	✗	9
1932	Franklin D. Roosevelt	Democratic	✓	8
1936	Franklin D. Roosevelt	Democratic	✓	8
1940	Franklin D. Roosevelt	Democratic	✓	8
1944	Franklin D. Roosevelt	Democratic	✓	8
1948	Strom Thurmond	States' Rights Democrat	✗	8
1952	Adlai Stevenson	Democratic	✗	8
1956	Adlai Stevenson	Democratic	✗	8
1960	John F. Kennedy	Democratic	✓	8
1964	Barry Goldwater	Republican	✗	8
1968	Richard Nixon	Republican	✓	8
1972	Richard Nixon	Republican	✓	8
1976	Jimmy Carter	Democratic	✓	8
1980	Ronald Reagan	Republican	✓	8
1984	Ronald Reagan	Republican	✓	8
1988	George H. W. Bush	Republican	✓	8
1992	George H. W. Bush	Republican	✗	8
1996	Bob Dole	Republican	✗	8
2000	George W. Bush	Republican	✓	8
2004	George W. Bush	Republican	✓	8
2008	John McCain	Republican	✗	8
2012	Mitt Romney	Republican	✗	9
2016	Donald Trump	Republican	✓	9
2020	Donald Trump	Republican	✗	9
2024	Donald Trump	Republican	✓	9

== See also ==
- 2026 South Carolina elections
- Political party strength in South Carolina
- South Carolina gubernatorial elections
- United States presidential elections in South Carolina
