= United States presidential elections in South Carolina =

Presidential elections in South Carolina
- Number of elections: 59
- Voted Democratic: 28
- Voted Republican: 18
- Voted Whig: 2
- Voted Democratic-Republican: 7
- Voted other: 4 (Note: Strom Thurmond, 1948; John Floyd, 1832; George Washington, 1788-89, 1792.)
- Voted for winning candidate: 34
- Voted for losing candidate: 25

Following is a table of United States presidential elections in South Carolina, ordered by year. Since its admission to statehood in 1788, South Carolina has participated in every U.S. presidential election except the election of 1864 during the American Civil War, when the state had seceded to join the Confederacy.

Winners of the state are in bold. The shading refers to the state winner, and not the national winner.

== Elections from 1864 to present ==
View source data.

Year	Winner (nationally)	Votes	Percent	Runner-up (nationally)	Votes	Percent	Other national candidates (Note: For purposes of these lists, other national candidates are defined as those who won at least one electoral vote, or won at least ten percent of the vote in multiple states.)	Votes	Percent	Electoral votes	Notes
2024	**Donald Trump**	1,483,747	58.23	Kamala Harris	1,028,452	40.36	—			9	
2020	Joe Biden	1,091,541	43.43	**Donald Trump**	1,385,103	55.11	—			9	
2016	**Donald Trump** (Note: Won the electoral college while losing the popular vote)	1,155,389	54.94	Hillary Clinton	855,373	40.67	—			9	
2012	Barack Obama	865,941	44.09	**Mitt Romney**	1,071,645	54.56	—			9	
2008	Barack Obama	862,449	44.90	**John McCain**	1,034,896	53.87	—			8	
2004	**George W. Bush**	937,974	57.98	John Kerry	661,699	40.90	—			8	
2000	**George W. Bush**	785,937	56.84	Al Gore	565,561	40.90	—			8	
1996	Bill Clinton	504,051	43.85	**Bob Dole**	573,458	49.89	Ross Perot	64,386	5.60	8	
1992	Bill Clinton	479,514	39.88	**George H. W. Bush**	577,507	48.02	Ross Perot	138,872	11.55	8	
1988	**George H. W. Bush**	606,443	61.50	Michael Dukakis	370,554	37.58	—			8	
1984	**Ronald Reagan**	615,539	63.55	Walter Mondale	344,470	35.57	—			8	
1980	**Ronald Reagan**	441,207	49.57	Jimmy Carter	427,560	48.04	John B. Anderson	14,150	1.59	8	
1976	**Jimmy Carter**	450,825	56.17	Gerald Ford	346,140	43.13	—			8	
1972	**Richard Nixon**	478,427	70.58	George McGovern	189,270	27.92	—			8	
1968	**Richard Nixon**	254,062	38.09	Hubert Humphrey	197,486	29.61	George Wallace	215,430	32.30	8	
1964	Lyndon B. Johnson	215,700	41.10	**Barry Goldwater**	309,048	58.89	—			8	
1960	**John F. Kennedy**	198,129	51.24	Richard Nixon	188,558	48.76	—			8	
1956	Dwight D. Eisenhower	75,700	25.18	**Adlai Stevenson II**	136,372	45.37	T. Coleman Andrews/ Unpledged Electors (Note: Was allied with a slate of unpledged electors in Louisiana, Mississippi and South Carolina)	88,511	29.45	8	
1952	Dwight D. Eisenhower	168,082	49.28	**Adlai Stevenson II**	173,004	50.72	—			8	
1948	Harry S. Truman	34,423	24.14	Thomas E. Dewey	5,386	3.78	**Strom Thurmond**	102,607	71.97	8	
1944	**Franklin D. Roosevelt**	90,601	87.64	Thomas E. Dewey	4,610	4.46	—			8	
1940	**Franklin D. Roosevelt**	95,470	95.63	Wendell Willkie	4,360	4.37	—			8	
1936	**Franklin D. Roosevelt**	113,791	98.57	Alf Landon	1,646	1.43	—			8	
1932	**Franklin D. Roosevelt**	102,347	98.03	Herbert Hoover	1,978	1.89	—			8	
1928	Herbert Hoover	5,858	8.54	**Al Smith**	62,700	91.39	—			9	
1924	Calvin Coolidge	1,123	2.21	**John W. Davis**	49,008	96.56	Robert M. La Follette	620	1.22	9	
1920	Warren G. Harding	2,610	3.91	**James M. Cox**	64,170	96.05	Parley P. Christensen	—	—	9	
1916	**Woodrow Wilson**	61,846	96.71	Charles E. Hughes	1,550	2.42	—			9	
1912	**Woodrow Wilson**	48,357	95.94	Theodore Roosevelt	1,293	2.57	William H. Taft	536	1.06	9	
1908	William H. Taft	3,945	5.94	**William Jennings Bryan**	62,288	93.84	—			9	
1904	Theodore Roosevelt	2,554	4.63	**Alton B. Parker**	52,563	95.36	—			9	
1900	William McKinley	3,579	7.04	**William Jennings Bryan**	47,233	92.96	—			9	
1896	William McKinley	9,313	13.51	**William Jennings Bryan**	58,801	85.3	—			9	
1892	**Grover Cleveland**	54,680	77.56	Benjamin Harrison	13,345	18.93	James B. Weaver	2,407	3.41	9	
1888	Benjamin Harrison	13,736	17.17	**Grover Cleveland**	65,824	82.28	—			9	
1884	**Grover Cleveland**	69,845	75.25	James G. Blaine	21,730	23.41	—			9	
1880	James A. Garfield	57,954	34.13	**Winfield S. Hancock**	111,236	65.51	James B. Weaver	567	0.33	7	
1876	**Rutherford B. Hayes**	91,786	50.24	Samuel J. Tilden	90,897	49.76	—			7	
1872	**Ulysses S. Grant**	72,290	75.73	Horace Greeley	22,699	23.78	—			7	
1868	**Ulysses S. Grant**	62,301	57.9	Horatio Seymour	45,237	42.1	—			6	
1864	Abraham Lincoln	n/a	n/a	George B. McClellan	n/a	n/a	—			n/a	No vote due to secession.

== Election of 1860 ==
The election of 1860 was a complex realigning election in which the breakdown of the previous two-party alignment culminated in four parties each competing for influence in different parts of the country. The result of the election, with the victory of an ardent opponent of slavery, spurred the secession of eleven states and brought about the American Civil War.

Year	Winner (nationally)	Votes	Runner-up (nationally)	Votes	Runner-up (nationally)	Votes	Runner-up (nationally)	Votes	Electoral votes
1860	Abraham Lincoln	no popular vote	Stephen A. Douglas	no popular vote	**John C. Breckinridge**	no popular vote	John Bell	no popular vote	8

Vote allocated by legislature.

== Elections from 1788-1789 to 1856 ==
In all elections from 1792 to 1860, South Carolina did not conduct a popular vote. Each Elector was appointed by the state legislature.

The election of 1824 was a complex realigning election following the collapse of the prevailing Democratic-Republican Party, resulting in four different candidates each claiming to carry the banner of the party, and competing for influence in different parts of the country. The election was the only one in history to be decided by the House of Representatives under the provisions of the Twelfth Amendment to the United States Constitution after no candidate secured a majority of the electoral vote. It was also the only presidential election in which the candidate who received a plurality of electoral votes (Andrew Jackson) did not become president, a source of great bitterness for Jackson and his supporters, who proclaimed the election of Adams a corrupt bargain.

Year	Winner (nationally)	Loser(s) (nationally)	Electoral votes	Notes
1856	**James Buchanan**	John C. Frémont; Millard Fillmore	8	
1852	**Franklin Pierce**	Winfield Scott; John P. Hale	8	
1848	Zachary Taylor	**Lewis Cass**; Martin Van Buren	9	
1844	**James K. Polk**	Henry Clay	9	
1840	William Henry Harrison	**Martin Van Buren**	11	
1836	Martin Van Buren	**Willie Person Mangum**; Three other candidates (Note: Three other candidates ran and received electoral votes nationally as part of the unsuccessful Whig strategy to defeat Martin Van Buren by running four candidates with local appeal in different regions of the country. The others were William Henry Harrison, Hugh Lawson White, and Daniel Webster. However, there was no popular vote in South Carolina, and this was the only state where Mangum was put forth as a candidate.)	11	South Carolina was the only state to vote for Mangum.
1832	Andrew Jackson	Henry Clay; William Wirt; **John Floyd**	11	South Carolina was the only state to vote for Floyd.
1828	**Andrew Jackson**	John Quincy Adams	11	
1824	John Quincy Adams	**Andrew Jackson**; Henry Clay; William H. Crawford	11	
1820	**James Monroe**	-	11	Monroe effectively ran unopposed.
1816	**James Monroe**	Rufus King	11	
1812	**James Madison**	DeWitt Clinton	11	
1808	**James Madison**	Charles C. Pinckney	10	
1804	**Thomas Jefferson**	Charles C. Pinckney	10	
1800	**Thomas Jefferson**	John Adams	8	
1796	John Adams	**Thomas Jefferson**	8	
1792	**George Washington**	-	8	Washington effectively ran unopposed.
1788-89	**George Washington**	-	7	Washington effectively ran unopposed.

== See also ==
- Elections in South Carolina
