= 2020 South Carolina elections =

- November 3, 2020

South Carolina state elections in 2020 were held in the U.S. state of South Carolina on November 3, 2020.

== See also ==
- Political party strength in South Carolina
- Politics of South Carolina
- Elections in South Carolina
