= 2024 South Carolina elections =

- November 5, 2024

The 2024 South Carolina elections were held on Tuesday, November 5, 2024.

== See also ==
- Political party strength in South Carolina
- Politics of South Carolina
- Elections in South Carolina
