= 1840 United States presidential election in South Carolina =

- November 23, 1840
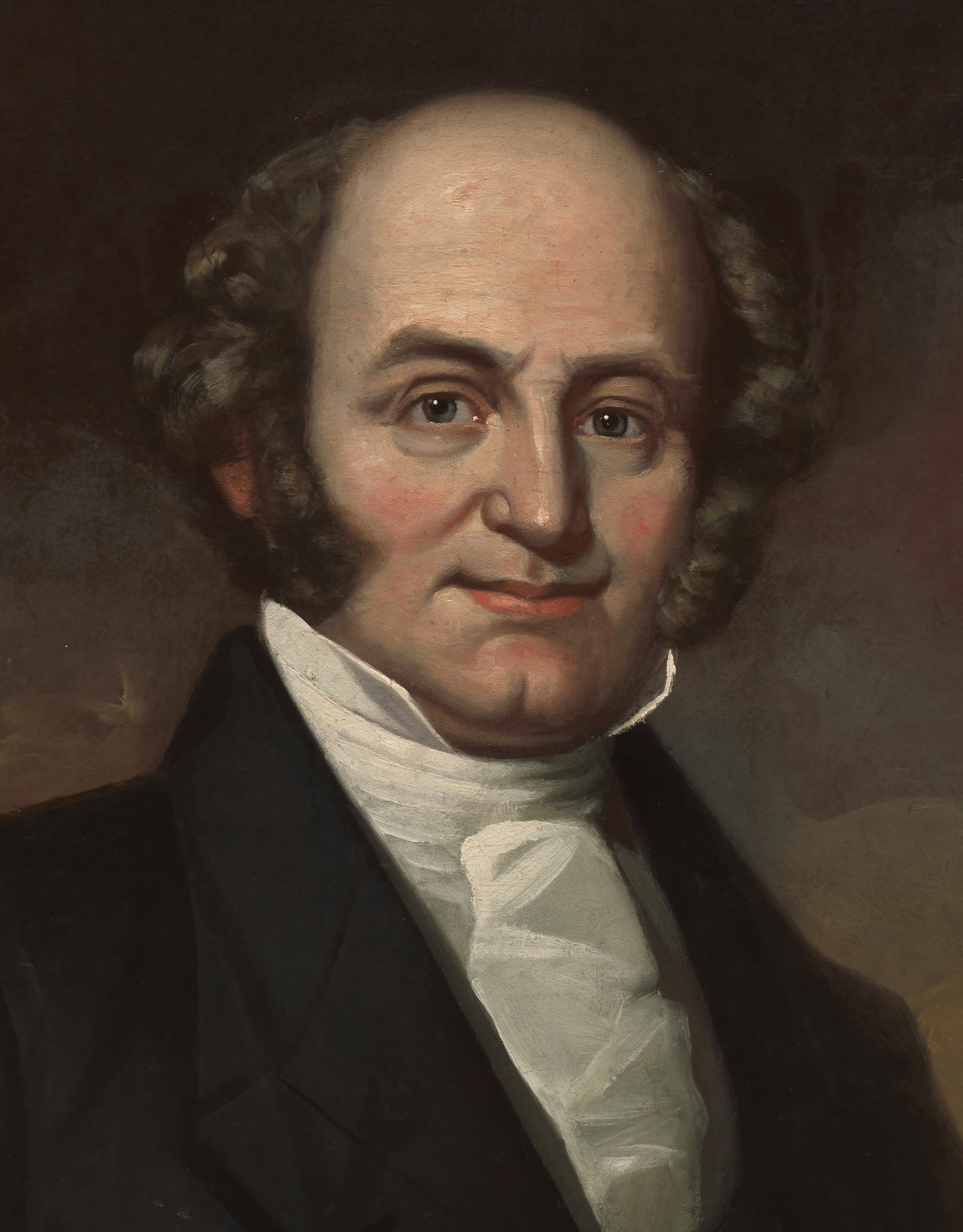
Nominee	Martin Van Buren
Party	Democratic
Home state	New York
Running mate	Littleton Tazewell
Electoral vote	11
President before election
Martin Van Buren
Democratic
Elected President
William Henry Harrison
Whig

A presidential election was held in South Carolina on November 23, 1840 as part of the 1840 United States presidential election. The state legislature chose 11 representatives, or electors to the Electoral College, rather than by popular vote, who voted for president and vice president.

South Carolina cast 11 electoral votes for the Democratic candidate Martin Van Buren. These electors were chosen by the South Carolina General Assembly, the state legislature. The General Assembly refused to support the current Vice President Richard Mentor Johnson, instead voting for Littleton Tazewell of Virginia for Vice President.

== Results ==
1840 United States presidential election in South Carolina
Party	Candidate	Running mate	Popular vote		Electoral vote	
Party	Candidate	Running mate	Count	%	Count	%
Democratic	Martin Van Buren of New York	Richard Mentor Johnson of Kentucky	–	–	11	100.00%

== See also ==
- United States presidential elections in South Carolina
