= 2008 South Carolina elections =

- November 4, 2008

In addition to federal elections for President, Senate, and the House of Representatives, South Carolina held state elections on Tuesday, November 4, 2008. Voters elected state senators, state representatives, solicitors and local officers, and voted in three statewide constitutional referendums.

== Federal ==
=== Presidential ===
Republican John McCain carried the state's eight electoral votes.

=== United States Senate ===
Republican incumbent Lindsey Graham was seeking re-election to the United States Senate, facing Democratic contender Bob Conley.

=== United States House ===
All six of South Carolina's seats in the United States House of Representatives were up for election in 2008.

== State ==
=== South Carolina Senate ===
Republicans maintained their majority in the State Senate, keeping their majority of eight seats.

=== South Carolina House of Representatives ===
Republicans maintained their majority in the State House, decreasing their majority from 22 seats to 20 seats.

== Constitutional referendums ==
Voters voted on Amendment 1, which amended Section 33 of Article III of the South Carolina Constitution to delete a provision that set the age of consent for sexual activity for unmarried women at 14. This amendment allowed the state legislature to set the age of consent by statute. The proposed amendment passed.

Amendment 1 Results by county Yes: 50–60%; No: 60–70%; 50–60%

Amendment 1
Choice	Votes	%
For	906,545	52.40
Against	823,599	47.60
Total	1,730,144	100.00
Registered voters/turnout	2,553,923	67.74
Source: - Official Results

Amendment 2 would have changed section 16 of Article X of the state constitution to allow state trust funds for post-retirement benefits of public school teachers and state employees to be invested in equity securities. The amendment failed.

Amendment 2 Results by county No: 60–70%; 50–60%

Amendment 2
Choice	Votes	%
For	727,918	41.85
Against	1,011,381	58.15
Total	1,739,299	100.00
Registered voters/turnout	2,553,923	68.10
Source: - Official Results

Amendment 3 would have amended section 16 of the Article X of the state constitution to allow local employee benefit trust funds to be invested in equity securities. The amendment failed.

Amendment 3 Results by county No: 60–70%; 50–60%; Yes: 50–60%

Amendment 3
Choice	Votes	%
For	748,232	43.58
Against	968,853	56.42
Total	1,717,085	100.00
Registered voters/turnout	2,553,923	67.23
Source: - Official Results
