= 1852 United States presidential election in South Carolina =

- November 2, 1852
Nominee	Franklin Pierce
Party	Democratic
Home state	New Hampshire
Running mate	William R. King
Electoral vote	8
President before election
Millard Fillmore
Whig
Elected President
Franklin Pierce
Democratic

The 1852 United States presidential election in South Carolina took place on November 2, 1852, as part of the 1852 United States presidential election. The state legislature chose 8 representatives, or electors to the Electoral College, who voted for President and Vice President.

South Carolina cast eight electoral votes for the Democratic candidate Franklin Pierce. These electors were chosen by the South Carolina General Assembly, the state legislature, rather than by popular vote.

== Results ==
1852 United States presidential election in South Carolina
Party	Candidate	Running mate	Popular vote		Electoral vote	
Party	Candidate	Running mate	Count	%	Count	%
Democratic	Franklin Pierce of New Hampshire	William R. King of Alabama	–	–	8	100.00%

== See also ==
- United States presidential elections in South Carolina
