= 1880 United States presidential election in South Carolina =

- November 2, 1880
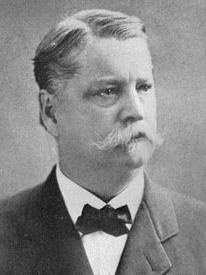

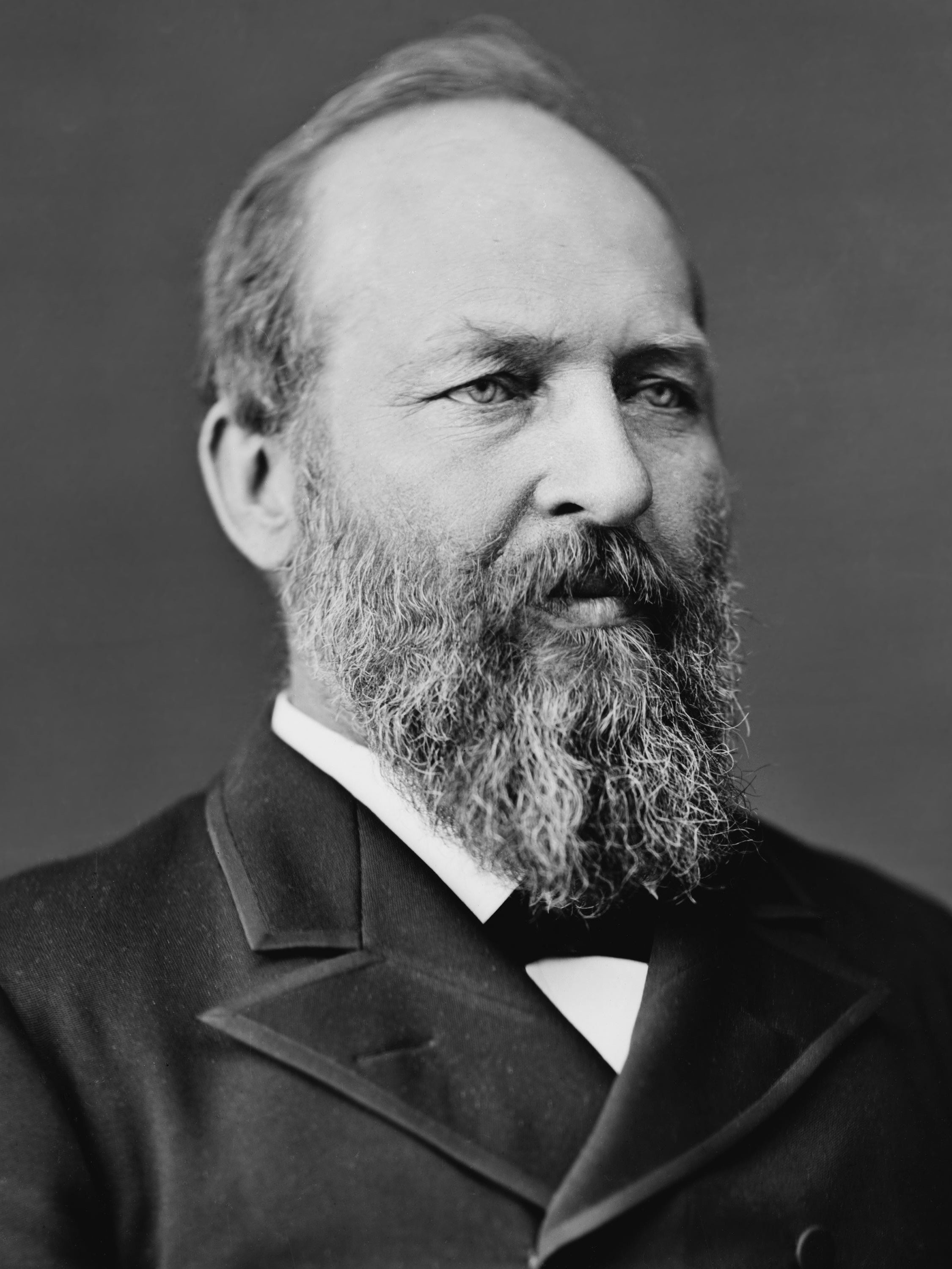
Nominee	Winfield Scott Hancock	James A. Garfield
Party	Democratic	Republican
Home state	Pennsylvania	Ohio
Running mate	William Hayden English	Chester A. Arthur
Electoral vote	7	0
Popular vote	111,236	57,954
Percentage	65.51%	34.13%
County results
Hancock
50–60%
60–70%
70–80%
80–90%
90–100%
Garfield
50–60%
60–70%
90–100%
President before election
Rutherford B. Hayes
Republican
Elected President
James A. Garfield
Republican

The 1880 United States presidential election in South Carolina took place on November 2, 1880, as part of the 1880 United States presidential election. Voters chose 7 representatives, or electors to the Electoral College, who voted for president and vice president.

South Carolina voted for the Democratic nominee, Winfield Scott Hancock, over the Republican nominee, James A. Garfield. Hancock won the state by a margin of 31.38%.

== Results ==
1880 United States presidential election in South Carolina
Party	Candidate	Running mate	Popular vote		Electoral vote	
Party	Candidate	Running mate	Count	%	Count	%
Democratic	Winfield Scott Hancock of Pennsylvania	William Hayden English of Indiana	111,236	65.51%	7	100.00%
Republican	James Abram Garfield of Ohio	Chester Alan Arthur of New York	57,954	34.13%	0	0.00%
Greenback	James Baird Weaver of Iowa	Barzillai Jefferson Chambers of Texas	567	0.33%	0	0.00%
N/A	Others	Others	36	0.02%	0	0.00%
Total			169,793	100.00%	7	100.00%

== See also ==
- United States presidential elections in South Carolina
