= 1816 United States presidential election in South Carolina =

- December 3, 1816
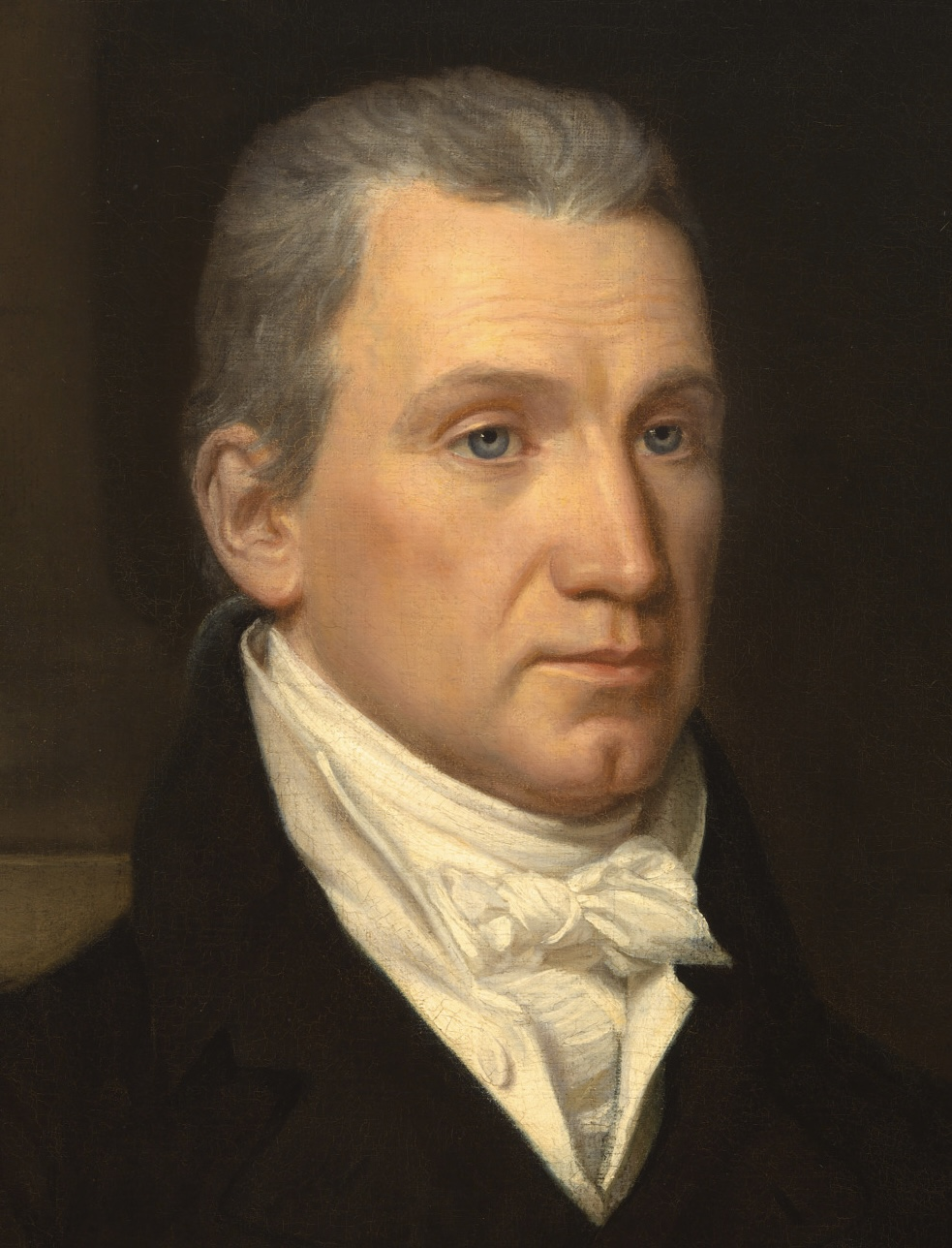
Nominee	James Monroe
Party	Democratic-Republican
Home state	Virginia
Running mate	Daniel D. Tompkins
Electoral vote	11
President before election
James Madison
Democratic-Republican
Elected President
James Monroe
Democratic-Republican

A presidential election was held in South Carolina on December 3, 1816, as part of the 1816 United States presidential election. The Democratic-Republican ticket of the U.S. secretary of state James Monroe and the governor of New York Daniel D. Tompkins received 11 votes from electors chosen by the South Carolina General Assembly. The Federalist Party failed to nominate a candidate. In the national election, Monroe easily defeated the senior U.S. senator from New York Rufus King, who received 34 votes from unpledged electors despite not being a candidate.

== General election ==
=== Results ===
1816 United States presidential election in South Carolina (Note: Results of balloting in the South Carolina General Assembly. The number of votes cast for each candidate is unknown.)
Party	Candidate	Votes
Democratic-Republican	Philemon Bradford	**
Democratic-Republican	James Duff	**
Democratic-Republican	Thomas Evans	**
Democratic-Republican	William Garrett	**
Democratic-Republican	Thomas Lee	**
Democratic-Republican	William MacKarrell	**
Democratic-Republican	Frederick Nance	**
Democratic-Republican	Joseph Reid	**
Democratic-Republican	Richard B. Screven	**
Democratic-Republican	John Thomas	**
Democratic-Republican	John L. Wilson	**
Total		**

=== Electoral college ===
1816 United States Electoral College vote in South Carolina
For President				For Vice President			
Candidate	Party	Home state	Electoral vote	Candidate	Party	Home state	Electoral vote
James Monroe	Democratic-Republican	Virginia	11	Daniel D. Tompkins	Democratic-Republican	New York	11
Total			11	Total			11

== See also ==
- United States presidential elections in South Carolina
