= 1812 United States presidential election in South Carolina =

- October 30 – December 2, 1812
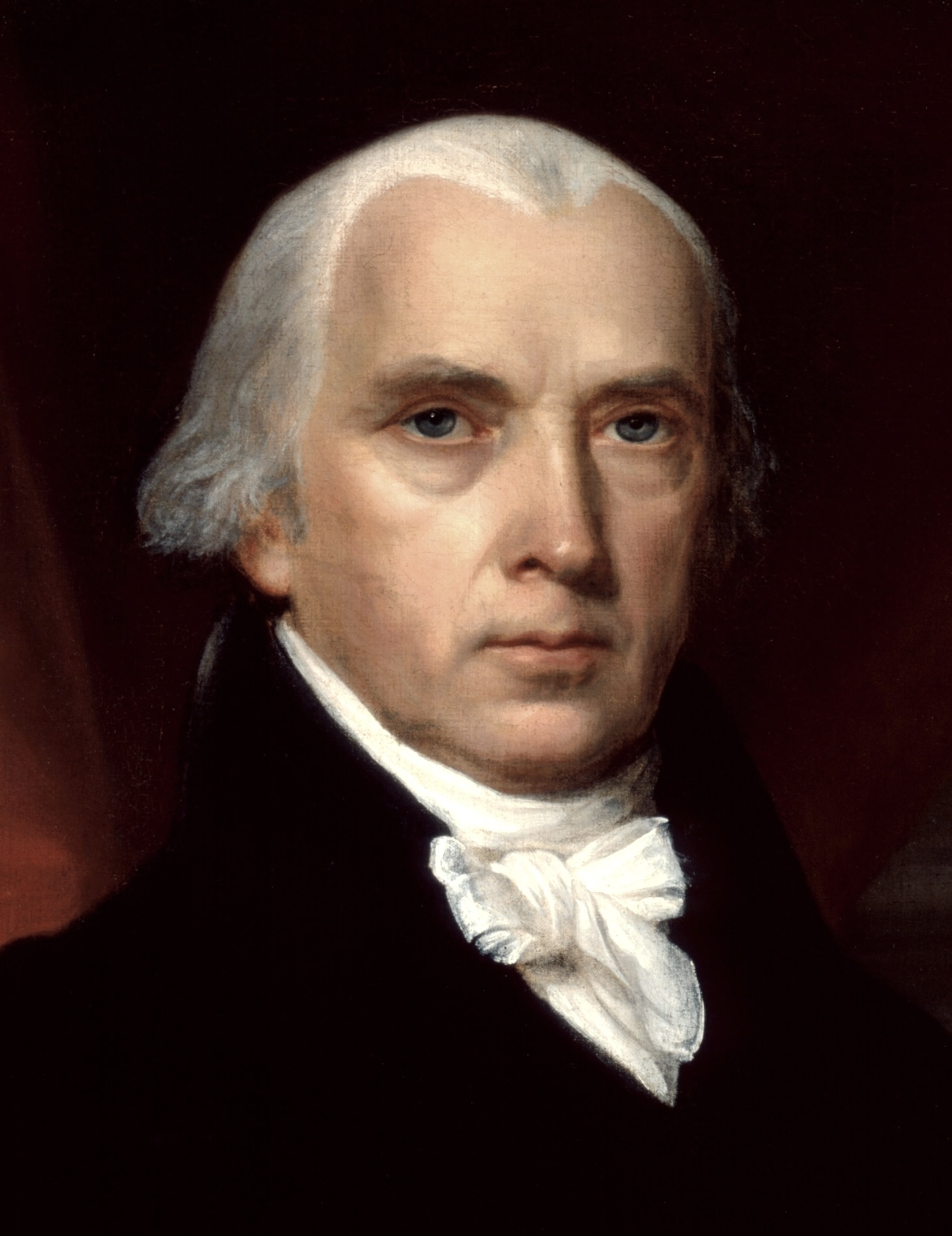
Nominee	James Madison
Party	Democratic-Republican
Home state	Virginia
Running mate	Elbridge Gerry
Electoral vote	11
Percentage	100%
President before election
James Madison
Democratic-Republican
Elected President
James Madison
Democratic-Republican

The 1812 United States presidential election in South Carolina took place between October 30 and December 2, 1812, as part of the 1812 United States presidential election. The state legislature chose 11 representatives, or electors to the Electoral College, who voted for President and Vice President.

During this election, South Carolina cast its 11 electoral votes to Democratic Republican candidate and incumbent President James Madison.

== See also ==
- United States presidential elections in South Carolina
