= 1788–89 United States presidential election in South Carolina =

- January 7, 1789
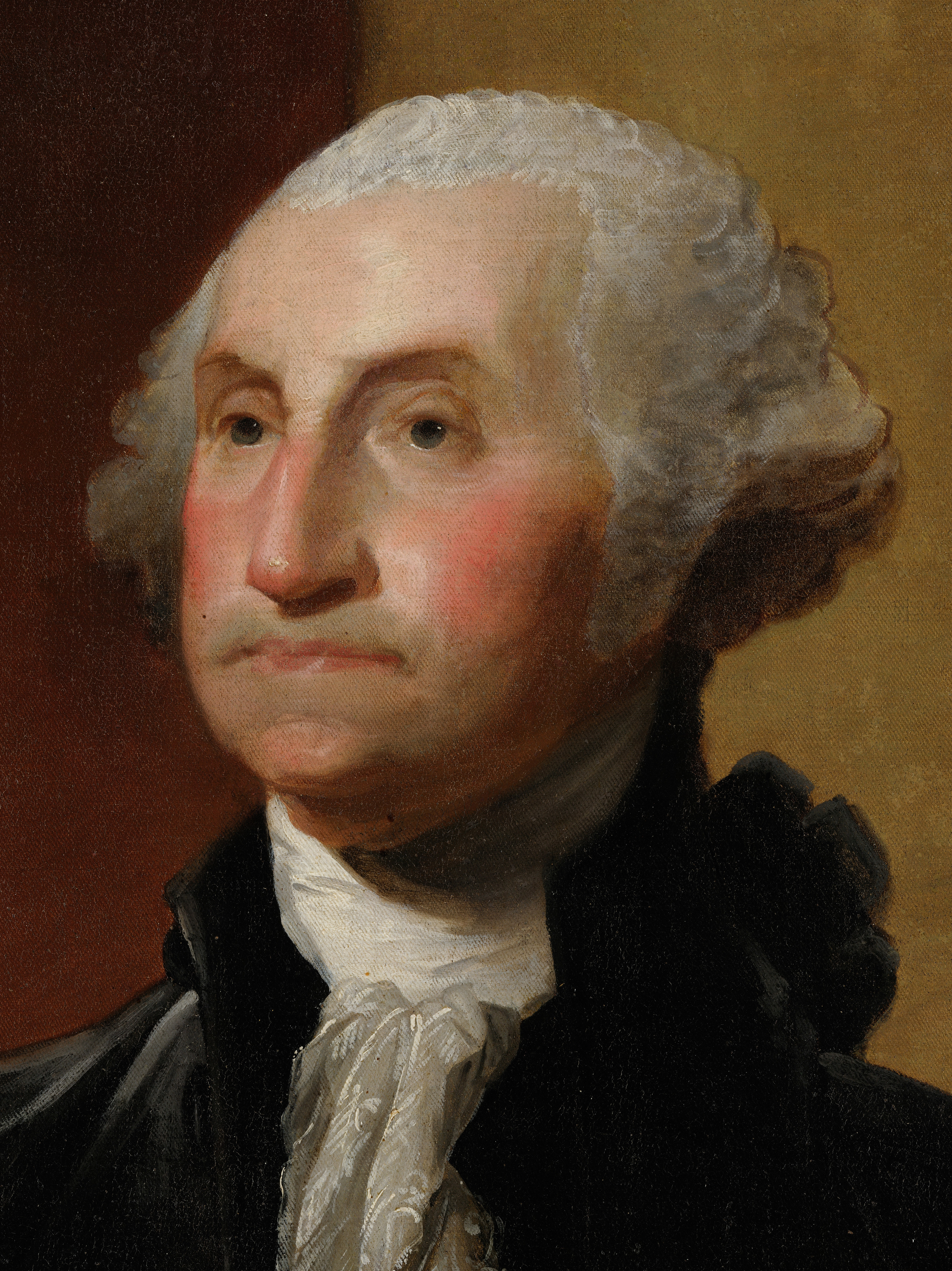

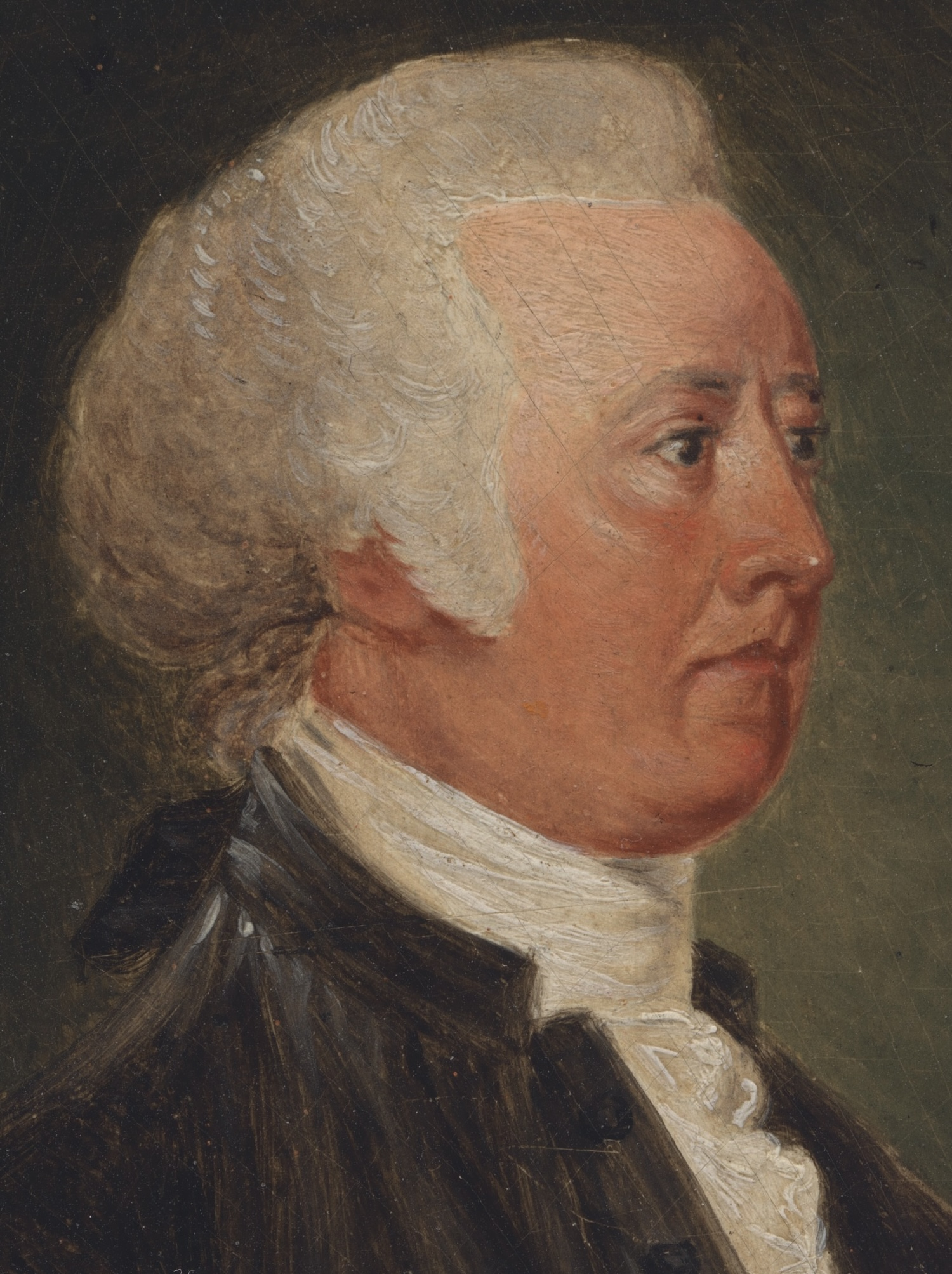

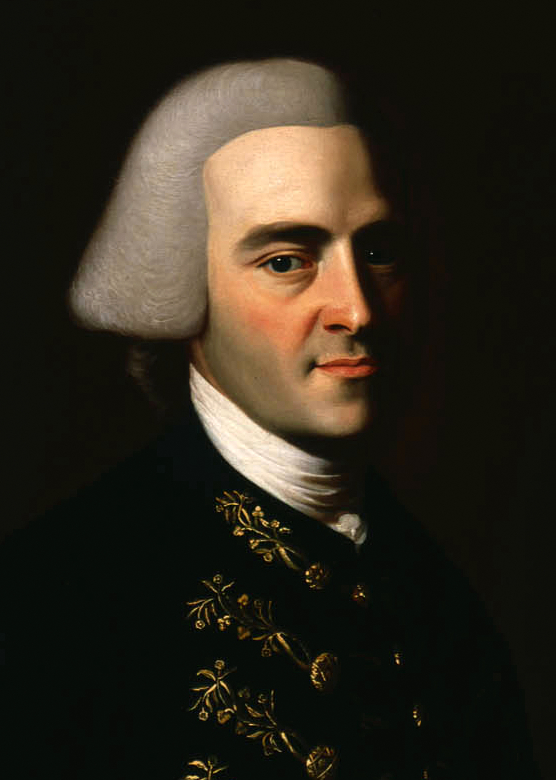
Nominee	George Washington	John Rutledge	John Hancock
Party	Independent	Federalist	Federalist
Home state	Virginia	South Carolina	Massachusetts
Electoral vote	7	6	1
Percentage	100.00%	–	–
President before election
Office established
Elected President
George Washington
Independent

A presidential election was held in South Carolina on January 7, 1789, as part of the 1789 United States presidential election. The state legislature chose 7 representatives, or electors to the Electoral College, who voted for President and Vice President.

South Carolina, which became the 8th state on May 23, 1788, unanimously cast its seven electoral votes for George Washington during its first presidential election.

== Results ==
1788-89 United States presidential election in South Carolina
Party	Candidate	Presidential electoral vote	%
Independent	George Washington	7	100.00%
Total votes		7	100.00%

=== Results by elector ===
1788-89 United States presidential election in South Carolina
Party	Candidate	Vice presidential electoral vote (Note: It is not known which elector voted for John Hancock.)
Federalist	Arthur Simkins	John Rutledge/John Hancock
Federalist	Charles Cotesworth Pinckney	John Rutledge/John Hancock
Federalist	Christopher Gadsden	John Rutledge/John Hancock
Federalist	Edward Rutledge	John Rutledge/John Hancock
Federalist	Henry Laurens	John Rutledge/John Hancock
Federalist	John Faucheraud Grimké	John Rutledge/John Hancock
Federalist	Thomas Heyward Jr.	John Rutledge/John Hancock

== See also ==
- United States presidential elections in South Carolina
