= 1844 United States presidential election in South Carolina =

- December 1, 1844
Nominee	James K. Polk
Party	Democratic
Home state	Tennessee
Running mate	George M. Dallas
Electoral vote	9
President before election
John Tyler
Independent
Elected President
James K. Polk
Democratic

A presidential election was held in South Carolina on December 1, 1844 as part of the 1844 United States presidential election. The state legislature chose 9 representatives, or electors to the Electoral College, who voted for President and Vice President.

South Carolina cast 9 electoral votes for the Democratic candidate James K. Polk. These electors were chosen by the South Carolina General Assembly, the state legislature, rather than by popular vote.

== Results ==
1844 United States presidential election in South Carolina
Party	Candidate	Running mate	Popular vote		Electoral vote	
Party	Candidate	Running mate	Count	%	Count	%
Democratic	James K. Polk of Tennessee	George M. Dallas of Pennsylvania	–	–	9	100.00%

== See also ==
- United States presidential elections in South Carolina
