= 2012 South Carolina elections =

- November 6, 2012

In addition to federal elections for President and the House of Representatives, South Carolina held state elections on Tuesday, November 6, 2012. Voters elected state senators, state representatives, solicitors and local officers, and voted in a statewide constitutional referendum. The state legislative elections were dramatically impacted by a ruling by the South Carolina Supreme Court that disqualified many candidates before the primary election.

== Federal offices ==
=== United States President ===
South Carolina had 9 electoral votes in the Electoral College. Republican Mitt Romney won with 54% of the vote.

=== United States House of Representatives ===
South Carolina has 7 congressional districts, electing 6 Republicans and 1 Democrat.

== State Legislature ==
=== South Carolina Senate ===
Republicans maintained their majority in the State Senate, increasing their majority from eight seats to nine.

=== South Carolina House of Representatives ===
Republicans maintained their majority in the State House, increasing their majority from 28 seats to 32 seats.

== Ballot Measures ==
Voters voted on Amendment 1, which amended Section 8 of Article IV of the South Carolina Constitution so that the lieutenant governor would be elected on the same ticket with the governor, rather than being elected in a separate election. The proposed amendment passed.

Amendment 1 Results by county Yes: 60–70%; 50–60%; No: 50–60%

Amendment 1
| Choice | Votes | % |
|---|---|---|
| For | 1,009,367 | 55.51 |
| Against | 809,063 | 44.49 |
| Total | 1,818,430 | 100.00 |
| Registered voters/turnout | 2,875,121 | 63.25 |
Source: - Official Results
