= 1916 United States presidential election in South Carolina =

- November 7, 1916

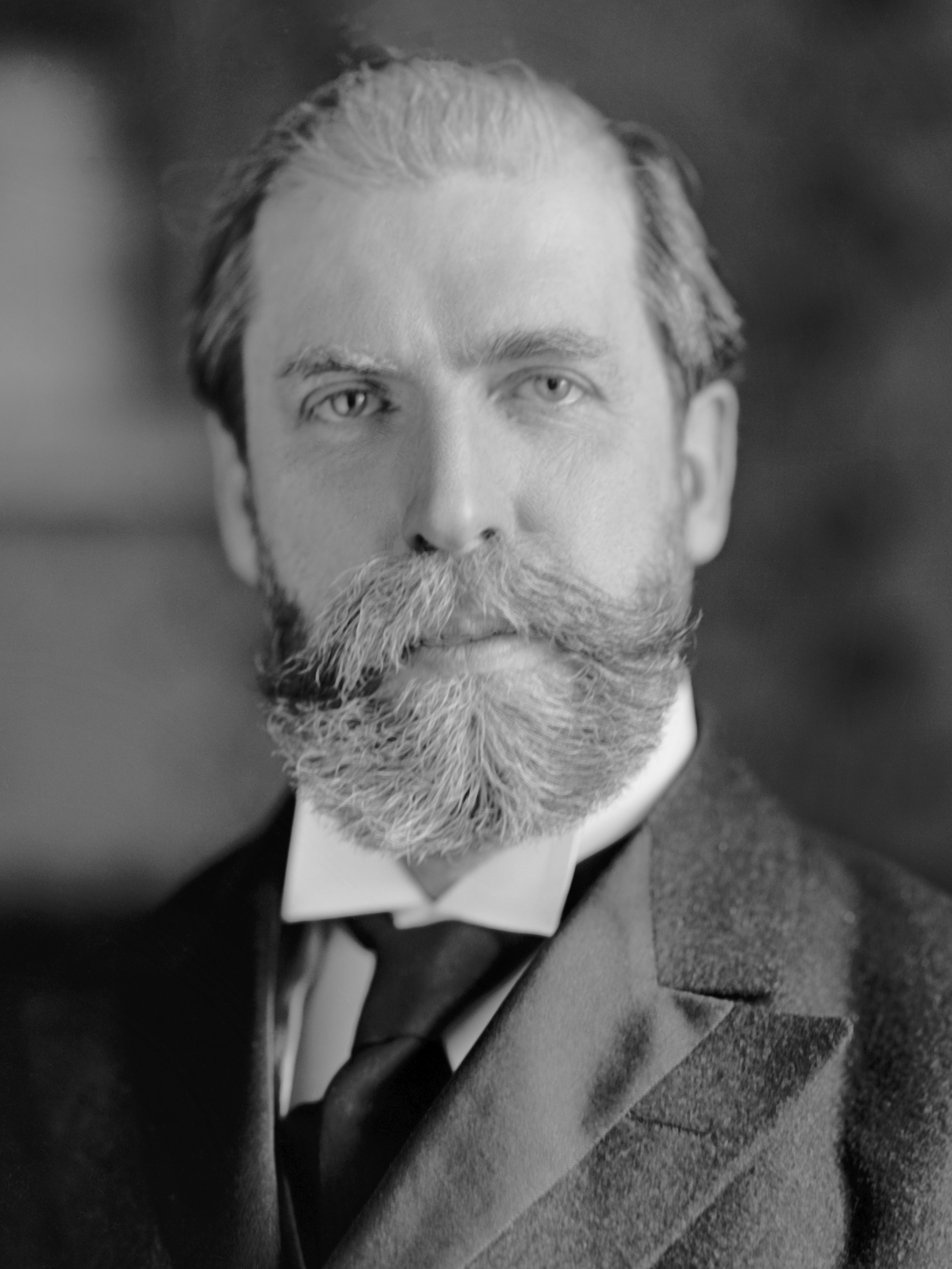
Nominee	Woodrow Wilson	Charles Evans Hughes
Party	Democratic	Republican
Home state	New Jersey	New York
Running mate	Thomas R. Marshall	Charles W. Fairbanks
Electoral vote	9	0
Popular vote	61,846	1,550
Percentage	96.71%	2.42%
County results
Wilson
70–80%
80–90%
90–100%
President before election
Woodrow Wilson
Democratic
Elected President
Woodrow Wilson
Democratic

The 1916 United States presidential election in South Carolina took place on November 7, 1916, as part of the 1916 United States presidential election which was held throughout all contemporary 48 states. Voters chose nine representatives, or electors, to the Electoral College, who voted for president and vice president.

South Carolina was won by the Democratic nominees, incumbent Democratic President Woodrow Wilson and Vice President Thomas R. Marshall. They defeated Republican nominee U.S. Supreme Court Justice Charles Evans Hughes of New York, and his running mate Senator Charles W. Fairbanks of Indiana.

Wilson won South Carolina by a landslide margin of 94.29%.

== Results ==
1916 United States presidential election in South Carolina
Party	Candidate	Running mate	Popular vote		Electoral vote	
Party	Candidate	Running mate	Count	%	Count	%
Democratic	Woodrow Wilson of New Jersey	Thomas Riley Marshall of Indiana	61,846	96.71%	9	100.00%
Republican	Charles Evans Hughes of New York	Charles Warren Fairbanks of Indiana	1,550	2.42%	0	0.00%
Write-in			259	0.40%	0	0.00%
Progressive	No candidate of N/A	No candidate of N/A	162	0.25%	0	0.00%
Socialist	Allan L. Benson of New York	George Ross Kirkpatrick of New Jersey	135	0.21%	0	0.00%
Total			63,952	100.00%	9	100.00%

== See also ==
- United States presidential elections in South Carolina
