= 1848 United States presidential election in South Carolina =

- November 7, 1848
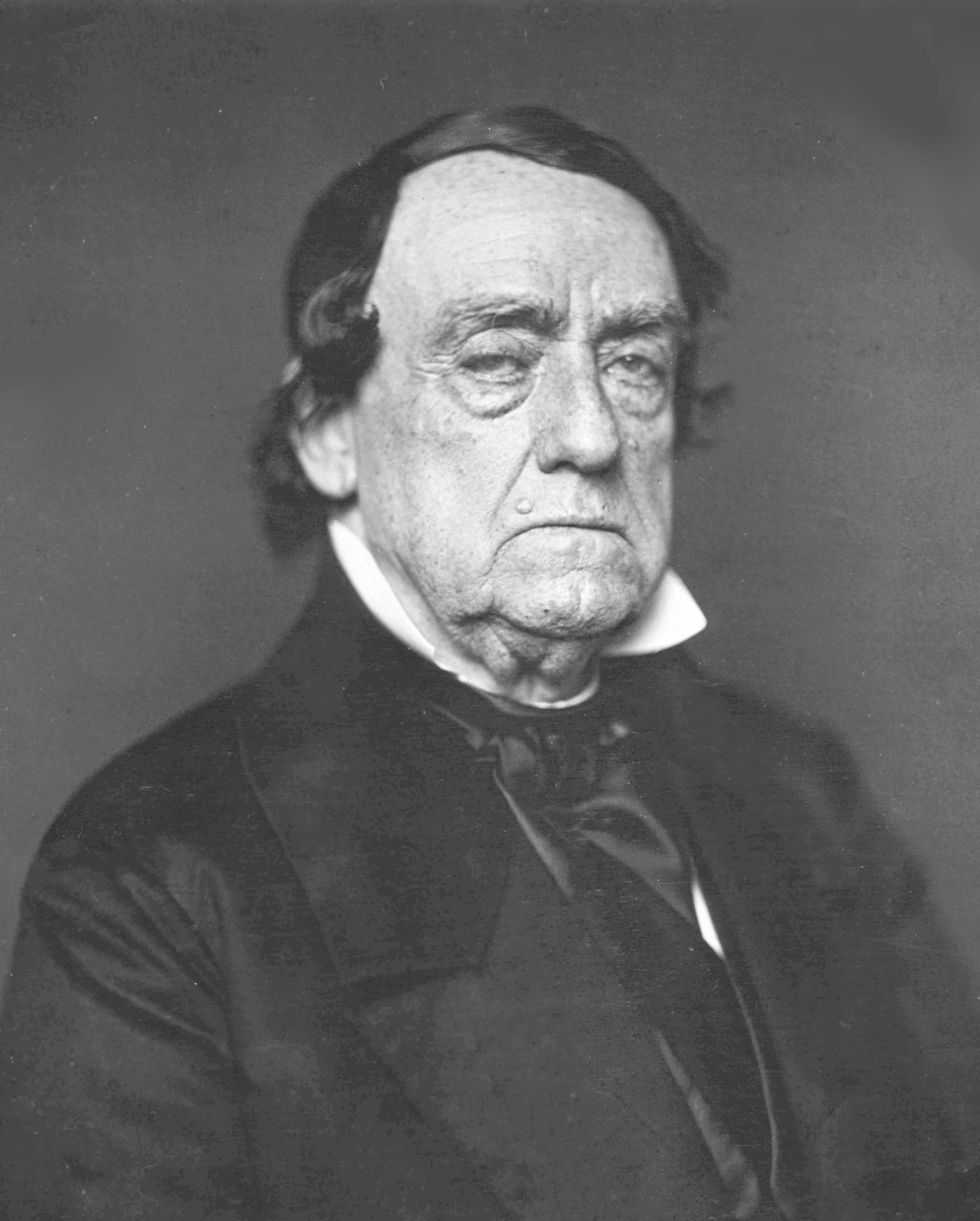

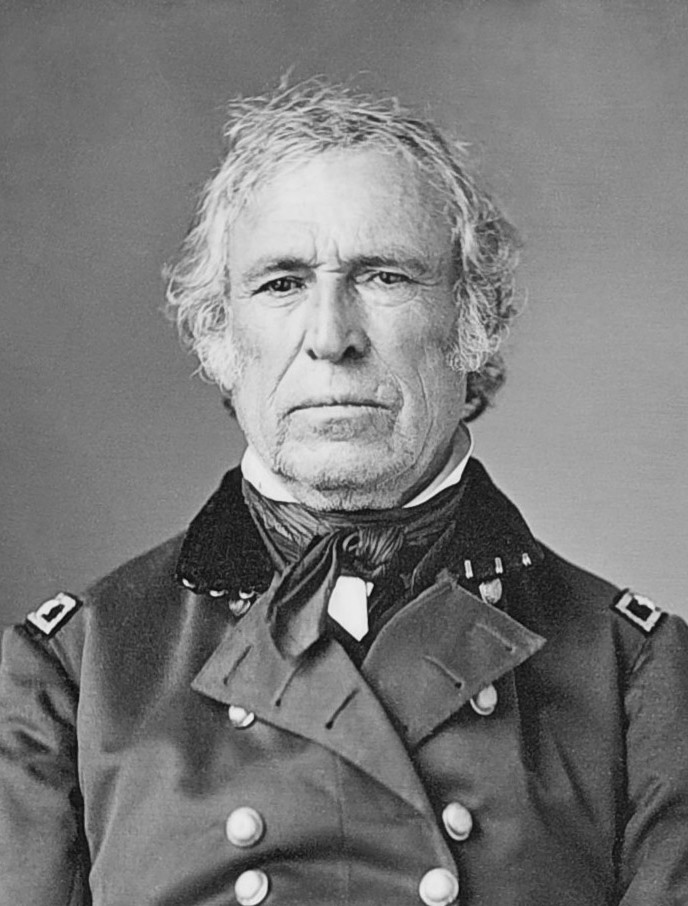
Nominee	Lewis Cass	Zachary Taylor
Party	Democratic	Whig
Home state	Michigan	Louisiana
Running mate	William O. Butler	Millard Fillmore
Electoral vote	9	0
Legislative vote	129	27
President before election
James K. Polk
Democratic
Elected President
Zachary Taylor
Whig

The 1848 United States presidential election in South Carolina took place on November 7, 1848, as part of the 1848 United States presidential election. The state legislature chose 9 representatives, or electors to the Electoral College, who voted for President and Vice President.

South Carolina cast 9 electoral votes for the Democratic candidate Lewis Cass. These electors were chosen by the South Carolina General Assembly, the state legislature, rather than by popular vote.

129 members of the South Carolina State Legislature voted for electors pledged to Cass, while 27 voted for electors pledged to Zachary Taylor. 8 did not vote.

== Results ==
1848 United States presidential election in South Carolina
Party	Candidate	Running mate	Popular vote		Electoral vote	
Party	Candidate	Running mate	Count	%	Count	%
Democratic	Lewis Cass of Michigan	William O. Butler of Kentucky	129	82.69%	9	100.00%
Whig	Zachary Taylor of Louisiana	Millard Fillmore of New York	27	17.31%	0	0.00%

== See also ==
- United States presidential elections in South Carolina
