= 1912 United States presidential election in South Carolina =

- November 5, 1912

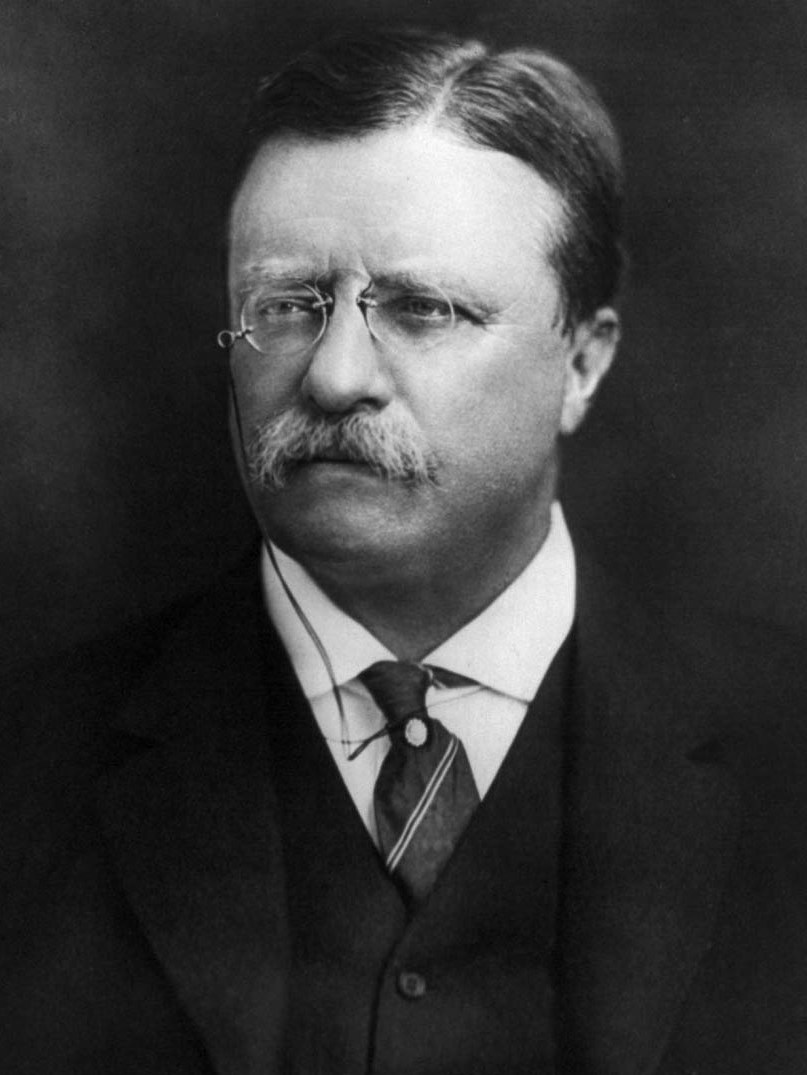
Nominee	Woodrow Wilson	Theodore Roosevelt
Party	Democratic	Progressive
Home state	New Jersey	New York
Running mate	Thomas R. Marshall	Hiram Johnson
Electoral vote	9	0
Popular vote	48,357	1,293
Percentage	95.94%	2.57%
County results
Wilson
80–90%
90–100%
President before election
William Howard Taft
Republican
Elected President
Woodrow Wilson
Democratic

The 1912 United States presidential election in South Carolina took place on November 5, 1912, as part of the 1912 United States presidential election which was held throughout all contemporary 48 states. Voters chose 9 representatives, or electors to the Electoral College, who voted for president and vice president.

South Carolina was won by the Democratic nominees, New Jersey Governor Woodrow Wilson and Indiana Governor Thomas R. Marshall. Wilson and Marshall defeated incumbent President William Howard Taft, and his running mate Vice President James S. Sherman and Progressive Party candidates, former President Theodore Roosevelt and his running mate California Governor Hiram Johnson.

Wilson won South Carolina by a landslide margin of 93.37%.

== Results ==
1912 United States presidential election in South Carolina
Party	Candidate	Running mate	Popular vote		Electoral vote	
Party	Candidate	Running mate	Count	%	Count	%
Democratic	Woodrow Wilson of New Jersey	Thomas Riley Marshall of Indiana	48,357	95.94%	9	100.00%
Progressive	Theodore Roosevelt of New York	Hiram Warren Johnson of California	1,293	2.57%	0	0.00%
Republican	William Howard Taft of Ohio	Nicholas Murray Butler of New York	536	1.06%	0	0.00%
Socialist	Eugene Victor Debs of Indiana	Emil Seidel of Wisconsin	164	0.33%	0	0.00%
N/A	Others	Others	55	0.11%	0	0.00%
Total			50,405	100.00%	9	100.00%

== See also ==
- United States presidential elections in South Carolina
