= 1856 United States presidential election in South Carolina =

- November 4, 1856
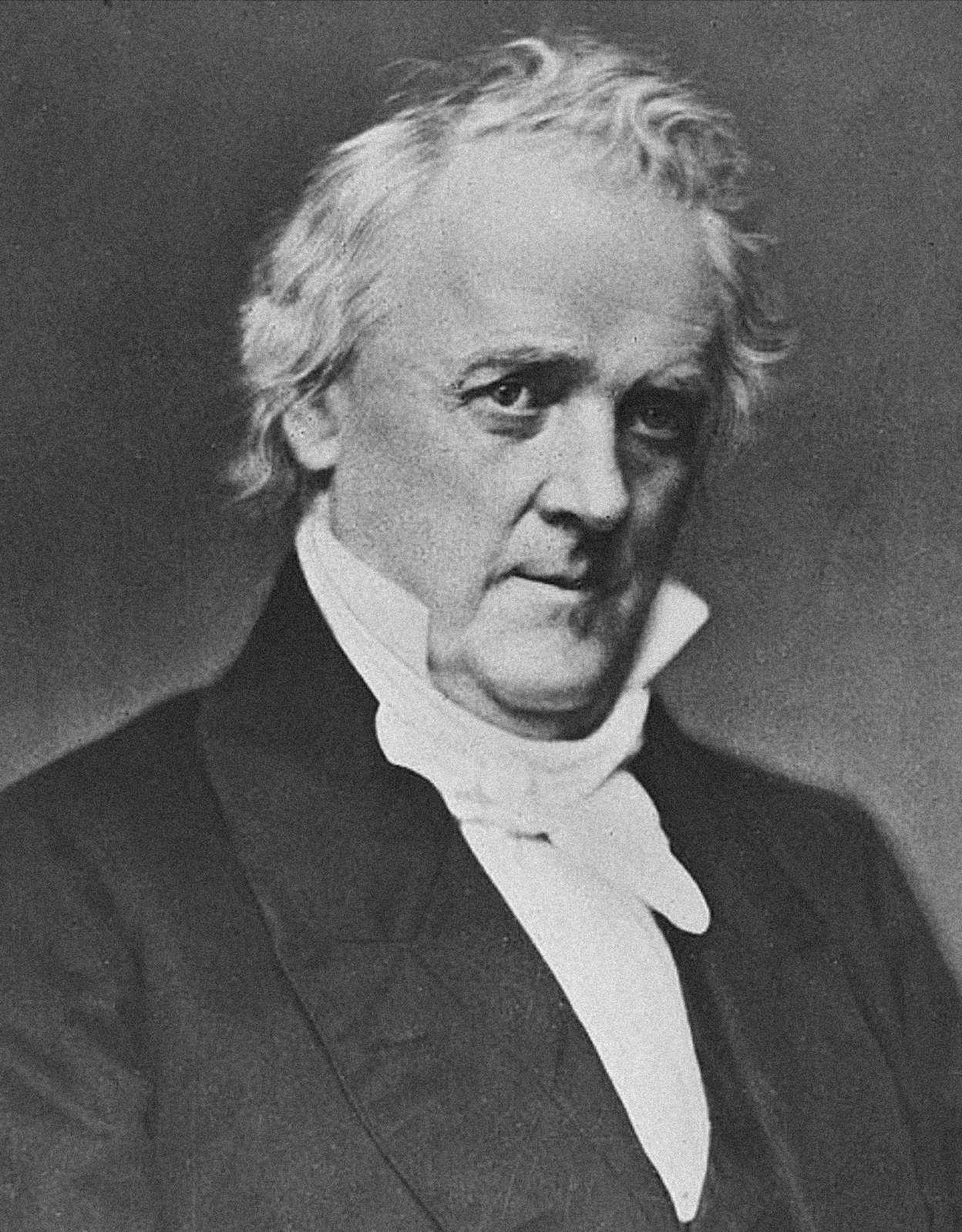
Nominee	James Buchanan
Party	Democratic
Home state	Pennsylvania
Running mate	John C. Breckinridge
Electoral vote	8
President before election
Franklin Pierce
Democratic
Elected President
James Buchanan
Democratic

The 1856 United States presidential election in South Carolina took place on November 4, 1856, as part of the 1856 United States presidential election. The state legislature chose 8 representatives, or electors to the Electoral College, who voted for president and vice president.

South Carolina cast 8 electoral votes for the Democratic candidate James Buchanan. These electors were chosen by the South Carolina General Assembly, the state legislature, rather than by popular vote.

== Results ==
1856 United States presidential election in South Carolina
Party	Candidate	Running mate	Popular vote		Electoral vote	
Party	Candidate	Running mate	Count	%	Count	%
Democratic	James Buchanan of Pennsylvania	John C. Breckinridge of Kentucky	–	–	8	100.00%

== See also ==
- United States presidential elections in South Carolina
