= 1904 United States presidential election in South Carolina =

- November 8, 1904
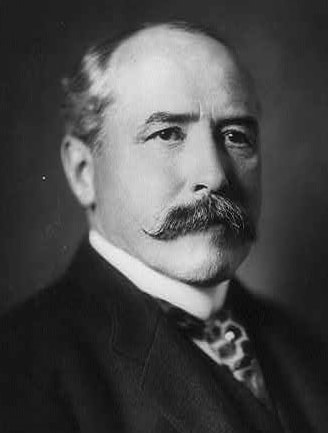

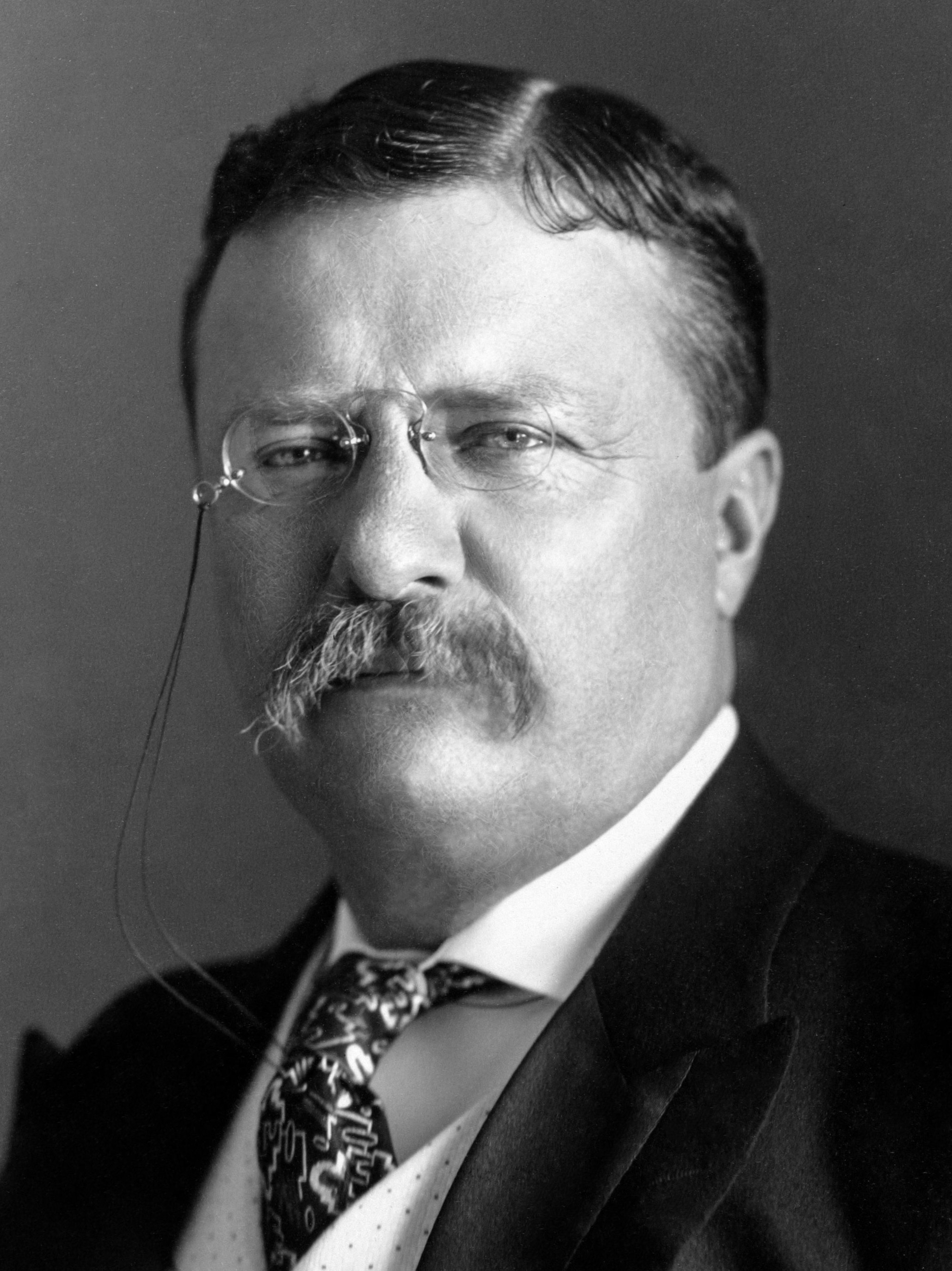
Nominee	Alton B. Parker	Theodore Roosevelt
Party	Democratic	Republican
Home state	New York	New York
Running mate	Henry G. Davis	Charles W. Fairbanks
Electoral vote	9	0
Popular vote	52,563	2,554
Percentage	95.36%	4.62%
County results
Parker
50–60%
80–90%
90–100%
President before election
Theodore Roosevelt
Republican
Elected President
Theodore Roosevelt
Republican

The 1904 United States presidential election in South Carolina took place on November 8, 1904, as part of the 1904 United States presidential election. Voters chose nine representatives, or electors to the Electoral College, who voted for president and vice president.

South Carolina voted for the Democratic nominee, former Chief Judge of New York Court of Appeals Alton B. Parker, over the Republican nominee, President Theodore Roosevelt. Parker won South Carolina by a landslide margin of 90.74 percentage points. Parker indeed won Hampton, Fairfield and Georgetown Counties unanimously due to the nearly complete disfranchisement of the black majority that was the Republican Party's sole support in the state.

With 95.36% of the popular vote, South Carolina would be Parker's strongest victory in terms of percentage of the popular vote.

Parker became the first presidential candidate to sweep every county in South Carolina.

== Results ==
1904 United States presidential election in South Carolina
Party	Candidate	Running mate	Popular vote		Electoral vote	
Party	Candidate	Running mate	Count	%	Count	%
Democratic	Alton Brooks Parker of New York	Henry Gassaway Davis of West Virginia	52,563	95.36%	9	100.00%
Republican	Theodore Roosevelt of New York (incumbent)	Charles Warren Fairbanks of Indiana	2,554	4.62%	0	0.00%
Populist	Thomas Edward Watson of Georgia	Thomas Tibbles of Nebraska	1	0.00%	0	0.00%
Total			55,118	100.00%	9	100.00%

=== Results by county ===
County	Alton Brooks Parker Democratic		Theodore Roosevelt Republican		Margin		Total votes cast
County	#	%	#	%	#	%	Total votes cast
Abbeville	665	96.94%	21	3.06%	644	93.88%	686
Aiken	1,672	97.95%	35	2.05%	1,637	95.90%	1,707
Anderson	1,952	96.73%	66	3.27%	1,886	93.46%	2,018
Bamberg	868	97.42%	23	2.58%	845	94.84%	891
Barnwell	1,401	97.56%	35	2.44%	1,366	95.13%	1,436
Beaufort	415	56.54%	319	43.46%	96	13.08%	734
Berkeley	665	85.26%	115	14.74%	550	70.51%	780
Charleston	1,754	89.99%	195	10.01%	1,559	79.99%	1,949
Cherokee	1,507	97.98%	31	2.02%	1,476	95.97%	1,538
Chester	954	99.17%	8	0.83%	946	98.34%	962
Chesterfield	1,158	98.97%	12	1.03%	1,146	97.95%	1,170
Clarendon	1,170	93.15%	86	6.85%	1,084	86.31%	1,256
Colleton	1,421	91.56%	131	8.44%	1,290	83.12%	1,552
Darlington	1,464	97.21%	42	2.79%	1,422	94.42%	1,506
Dorchester	706	91.10%	69	8.90%	637	82.19%	775
Edgefield	967	99.49%	5	0.51%	962	98.97%	972
Fairfield	723	100.00%	0	0.00%	723	100.00%	723
Florence	1,406	97.84%	31	2.16%	1,375	95.69%	1,437
Georgetown	728	100.00%	0	0.00%	728	100.00%	728
Greenville	2,489	97.42%	66	2.58%	2,423	94.83%	2,555
Greenwood	1,332	99.92%	1	0.08%	1,331	99.85%	1,333
Hampton	1,079	100.00%	0	0.00%	1,079	100.00%	1,079
Horry	980	96.08%	40	3.92%	940	92.16%	1,020
Kershaw	850	97.14%	25	2.86%	825	94.29%	875
Lancaster	1,504	95.61%	69	4.39%	1,435	91.23%	1,573
Laurens	1,777	97.26%	50	2.74%	1,727	94.53%	1,827
Lee	1,128	98.86%	13	1.14%	1,115	97.72%	1,141
Lexington	2,403	97.56%	60	2.44%	2,343	95.13%	2,463
Marion	1,507	96.85%	49	3.15%	1,458	93.70%	1,556
Marlboro	755	98.18%	14	1.82%	741	96.36%	769
Newberry	1,364	97.64%	33	2.36%	1,331	95.28%	1,397
Oconee	720	92.07%	62	7.93%	658	84.14%	782
Orangeburg	2,941	92.51%	238	7.49%	2,703	85.03%	3,179
Pickens	914	99.35%	6	0.65%	908	98.70%	920
Richland	1,220	90.91%	122	9.09%	1,098	81.82%	1,342
Saluda	938	99.26%	7	0.74%	931	98.52%	945
Spartanburg	2,621	96.89%	84	3.11%	2,537	93.79%	2,705
Sumter	919	87.03%	137	12.97%	782	74.05%	1,056
Union	1,593	96.49%	58	3.51%	1,535	92.97%	1,651
Williamsburg	1,476	88.76%	187	11.24%	1,289	77.51%	1,663
York	1,198	97.96%	25	2.04%	1,173	95.91%	1,223
Totals	53,304	95.40%	2,570	4.60%	50,734	90.80%	55,874

== See also ==
- United States presidential elections in South Carolina
