= 1800 United States presidential election in South Carolina =

- October 31 – December 3, 1800
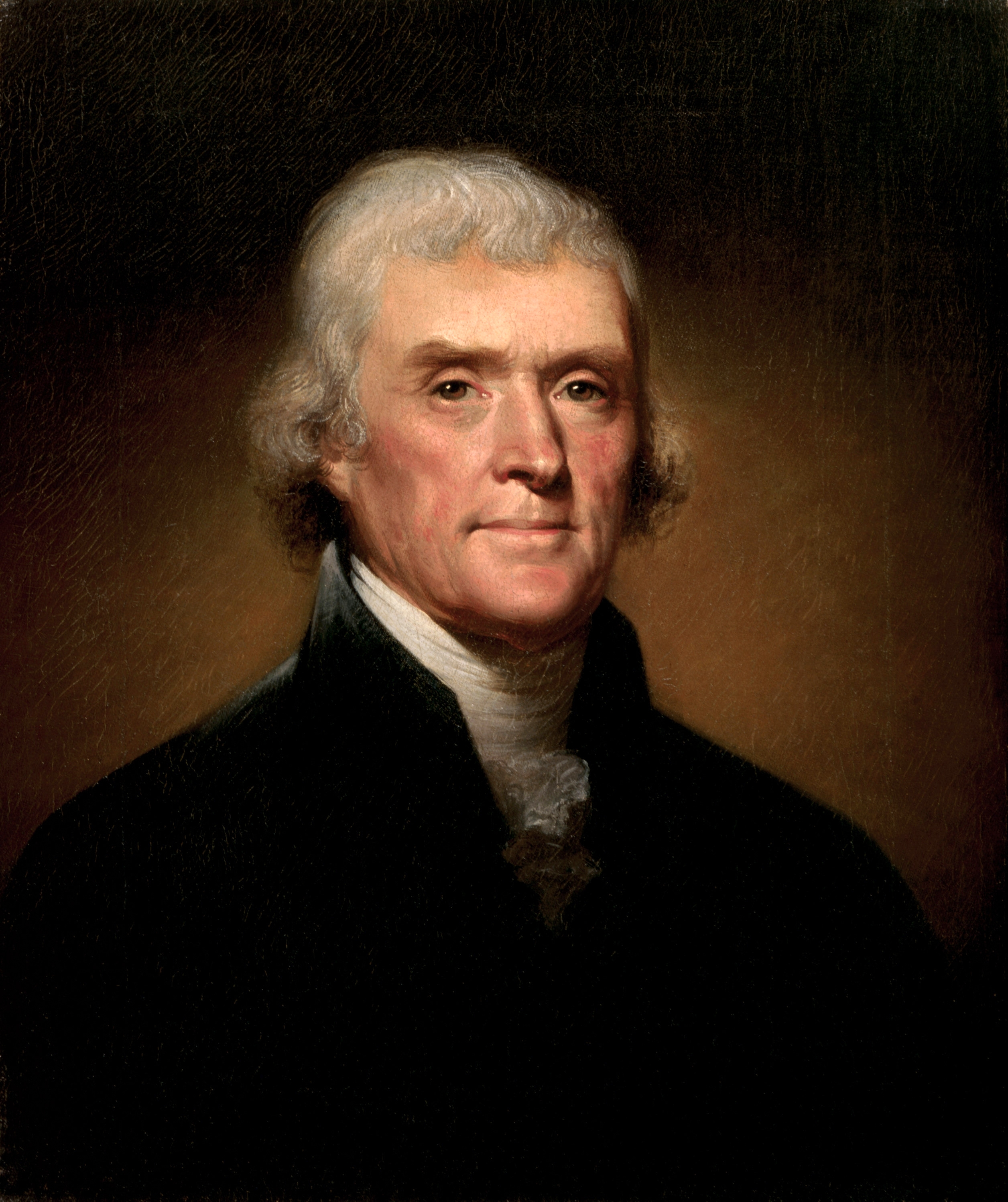

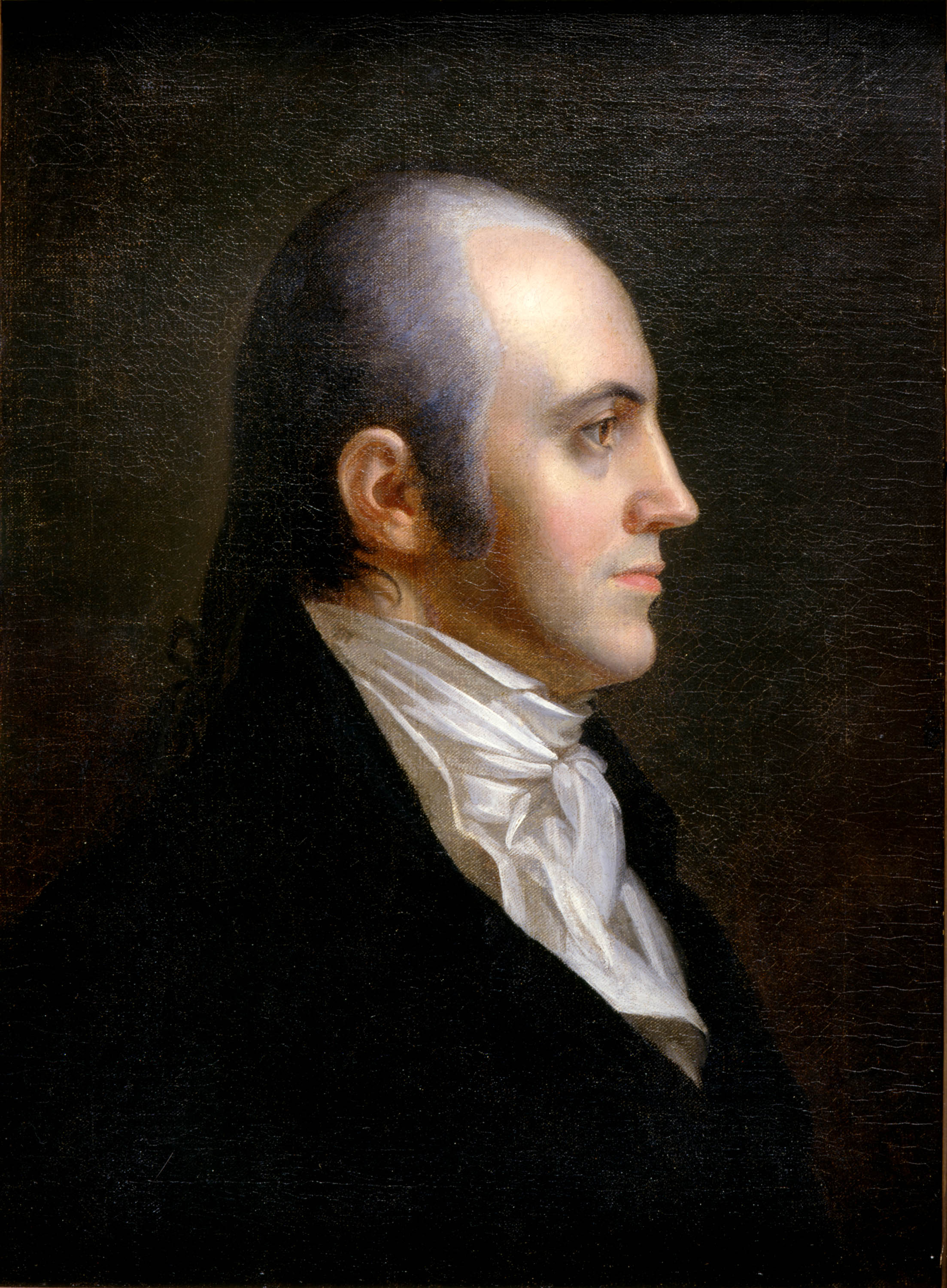
Nominee	Thomas Jefferson	Aaron Burr
Party	Democratic-Republican	Democratic-Republican
Home state	Virginia	New York
Electoral vote	8	8
Percentage	100%	100%
President before election
John Adams
Federalist
Elected President
Thomas Jefferson
Democratic-Republican

In the 1800 United States presidential election, electors to the United States Electoral College could be selected in each state at any time after October 31 and all electors were required to vote on December 3, 1800. Based on the constitutional provision in effect at that time, each elector cast two votes. The candidate receiving most votes would be President. The runner up would be elected Vice President.

During this election, the Federalist Party nominated incumbent President John Adams of Massachusetts and South Carolina native General Charles Cotesworth Pinckney. The Democratic-Republican Party nominated incumbent Vice President Thomas Jefferson of Virginia and Aaron Burr of New York.

Federalists hoped to receive votes in South Carolina based on the presence on the ticket of native son, Charles Cotesworth Pinckney. The Democratic-Republican campaign in the state was led by General Pinckney's first cousin, Senator Charles Pinckney, Jr.

When the choice of South Carolina electors came before the state Legislature beginning in late November 1800, there was much discussion about a possible compromise whereby electors would be selected who would split their ballots between Federalist, General Pinckney and Democratic Republican, Jefferson. Ultimately on December 2, 1800, just one day before election day, the Legislature selected a slate of 8 electors, all of whom were committed to voting for Democratic Republican candidates.

On election day, December 3, 1800, all of the 8 South Carolina electors cast their electoral votes for Jefferson and Burr.

== See also ==
- United States presidential elections in South Carolina
