= 1828 United States presidential election in South Carolina =

- October 31 – December 2, 1828
Nominee	Andrew Jackson
Party	Democratic
Home state	Tennessee
Running mate	John C. Calhoun
Electoral vote	11
President before election
John Quincy Adams
Democratic-Republican
Elected President
Andrew Jackson
Democratic

The 1828 United States presidential election in South Carolina took place between October 31 and December 2, 1828, as part of the 1828 United States presidential election. The state legislature chose 11 representatives, or electors to the Electoral College, who voted for President and Vice President.

South Carolina cast its 11 electoral votes for the Democratic candidate, Andrew Jackson. These electors were elected by the South Carolina General Assembly, the state legislature, rather than by popular vote.

== Results ==
1828 United States presidential election in South Carolina
Party	Candidate	Votes	Percentage	Electoral votes
Democratic	Andrew Jackson	–	–	11
Totals		–	–	11

== See also ==
- United States presidential elections in South Carolina
