= 1808 United States presidential election in South Carolina =

- November 4 – December 7, 1808
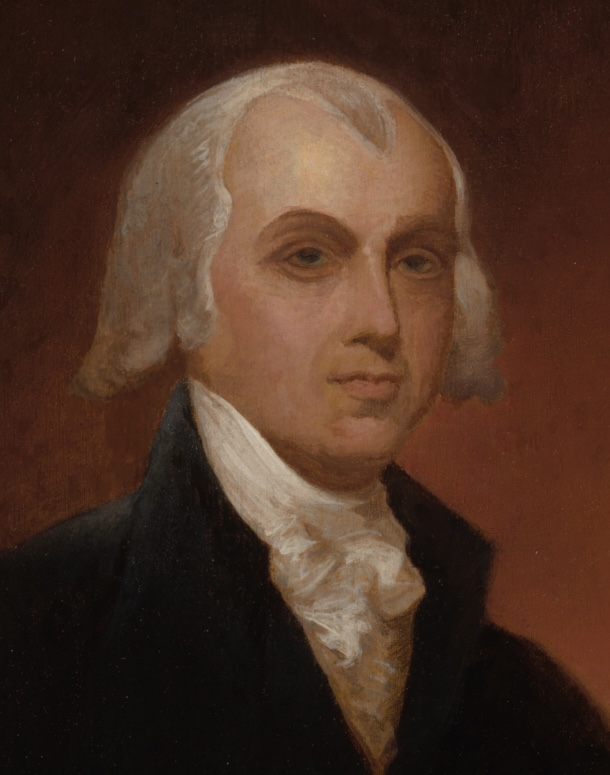
Nominee	James Madison
Party	Democratic-Republican
Home state	Virginia
Running mate	George Clinton
Electoral vote	10
Percentage	100%
President before election
Thomas Jefferson
Democratic-Republican
Elected President
James Madison
Democratic-Republican

The 1808 United States presidential election in South Carolina took place between November 4 and December 7, 1808, as part of the 1808 United States presidential election. The state legislature chose 10 representatives, or electors to the Electoral College, who voted for President and Vice President.

During this election, South Carolina cast its 10 electoral votes to Democratic Republican candidate and Secretary of State James Madison.

== See also ==
- United States presidential elections in South Carolina
