= 1804 United States presidential election in South Carolina =

- December 4, 1804
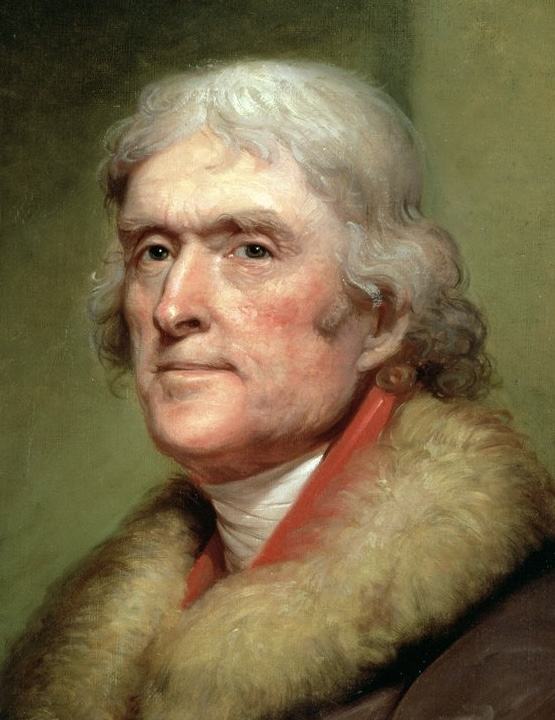
Nominee	Thomas Jefferson
Party	Democratic-Republican
Home state	Virginia
Running mate	George Clinton
Electoral vote	10
Legislative vote	140
Percentage	100.0%
President before election
Thomas Jefferson
Democratic-Republican
Elected President
Thomas Jefferson
Democratic-Republican

A presidential election was held in South Carolina between December 4, 1804, as part of the 1804 United States presidential election. The Democratic-Republican Party's ticket of incumbent president Thomas Jefferson and former New York governor George Clinton was elected unanimously in the South Carolina General Assembly. Jefferson won the national election in a landslide over the de facto Federalist candidate, Charles Cotesworth Pinckney.

== General election ==
1804 United States presidential election in South Carolina (Note: Percentages are calculated based on the total number of senators (22) and representatives (108) voting.)
Party	Candidate	Votes	%
Democratic-Republican	John Blake	130	92.86
Democratic-Republican	John Gaillard	129	92.14
Democratic-Republican	Thomas Taylor	129	92.14
Democratic-Republican	Joseph Blyth	124	88.57
Democratic-Republican	Joseph Calhoun	123	87.86
Democratic-Republican	Samuel Warren	121	86.43
Democratic-Republican	Arthur Simkins	116	82.86
Democratic-Republican	William Hill	108	77.14
Democratic-Republican	James Miles	95	67.86
Democratic-Republican	John Taylor	92	65.71
Total votes		140	100.00

== See also ==
- United States presidential elections in South Carolina

== Bibliography ==
- Dauer, Manning Julian (2002). "Election of 1804". In Schlesinger, Arthur M. Jr.; Israel, Fred L. (eds.). History of American Presidential Elections, 1789–2001. Vol. 1. Philadelphia: Chelsea House Publishers. pp. 159–82.
- Lampi, Philip J. (2012). "South Carolina 1804 Electoral College". A New Nation Votes. American Antiquarian Society.
