= 1824 United States presidential election in South Carolina =

- 1824
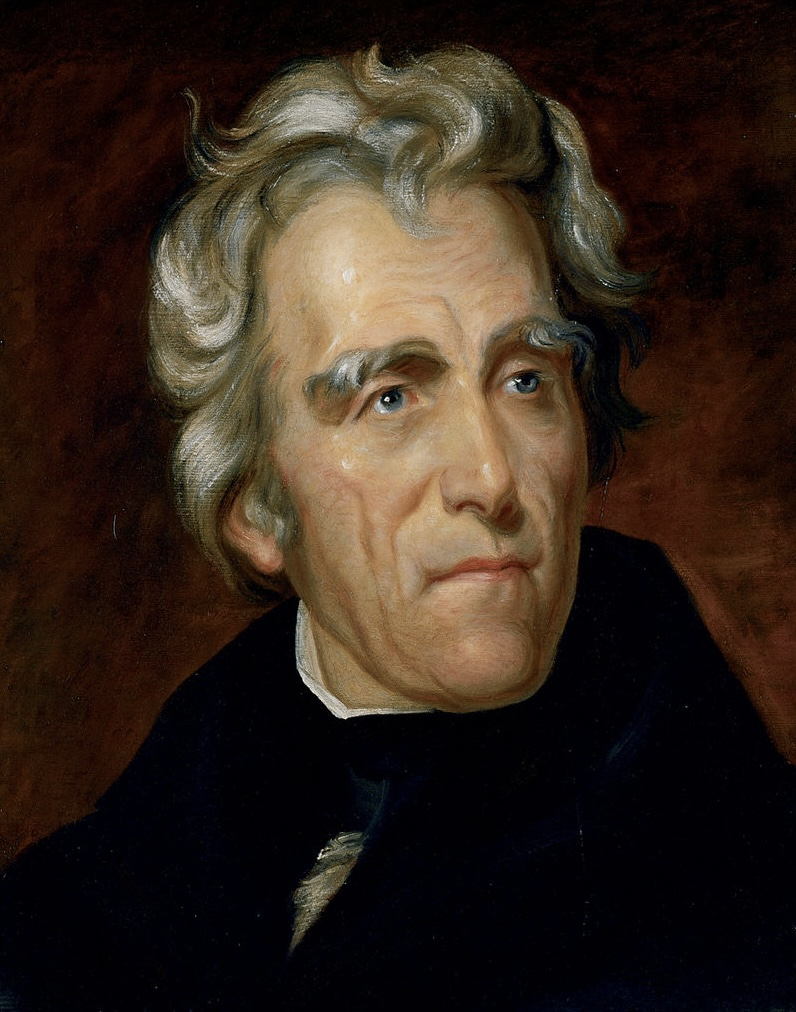
Nominee	Andrew Jackson
Party	Democratic-Republican
Home state	Tennessee
Running mate	John C. Calhoun
Electoral vote	11
Popular vote	154
Percentage	100%
President before election
James Monroe
Democratic-Republican
Elected President
John Quincy Adams
Democratic-Republican

The 1824 United States presidential election in South Carolina took place in 1824 as part of the 1824 United States presidential election. The state legislature chose 11 representatives, or electors to the Electoral College, who voted for President and Vice President.

South Carolina cast 11 eleven electoral votes for Andrew Jackson. These electors were elected by the South Carolina General Assembly, the state legislature, rather than by popular vote.

== Opinion poll ==
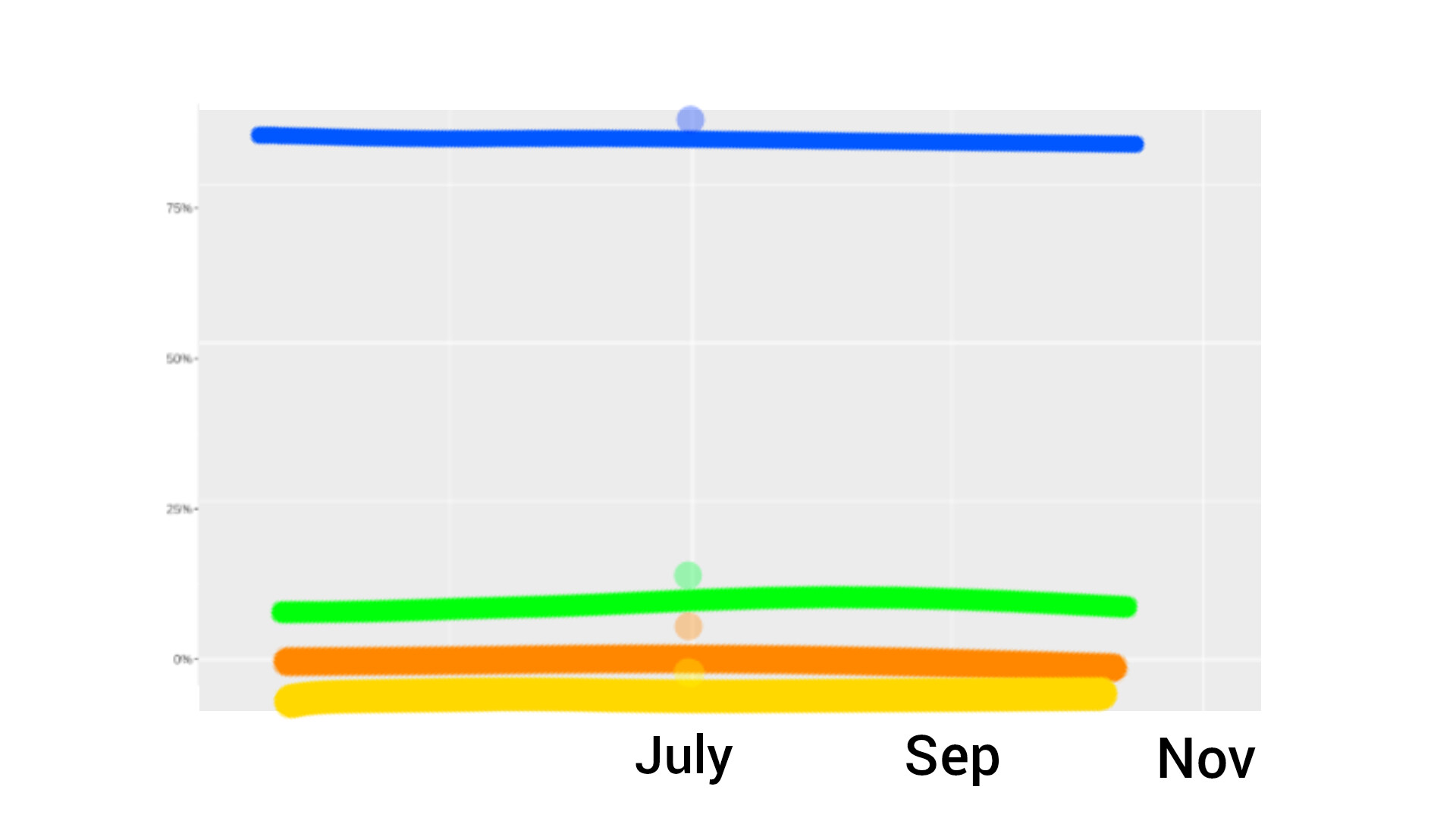
1824 United States Presidential Election Opinion Polling In South Carolina

While presidential electors were selected by the legislature, polls were occasionally held to gauge popular opinion. However, these polls had little impact on the outcome of the legislative election. The returns listed below are incomplete.

Source	Date(s) administered	Sample size	Andrew Jackson	John Adams	William Crawford	Henry Clay	John Calhoun	Others
A New Nation Votes	July 5, 1824	4,027	88.83%	7.90%	2.51%	0.40%	0.20%	0.17%

== Results ==
1824 United States presidential election in South Carolina
Party	Candidate	Votes	Percentage	Electoral votes
Democratic-Republican	Andrew Jackson	154	100%	11
Totals		154	100%	11

== See also ==
- United States presidential elections in South Carolina
