= 1888 United States presidential election in South Carolina =

- November 6, 1888
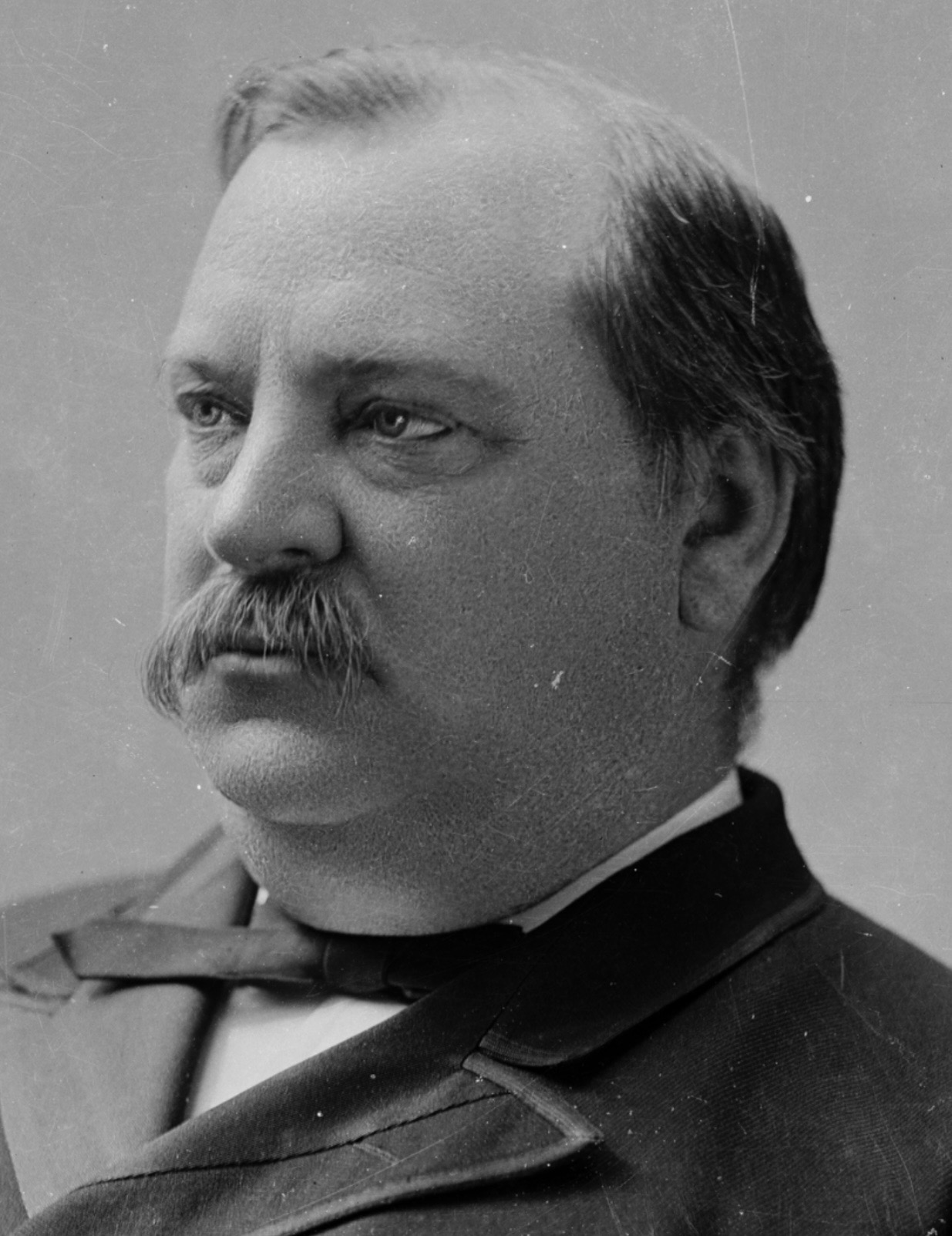

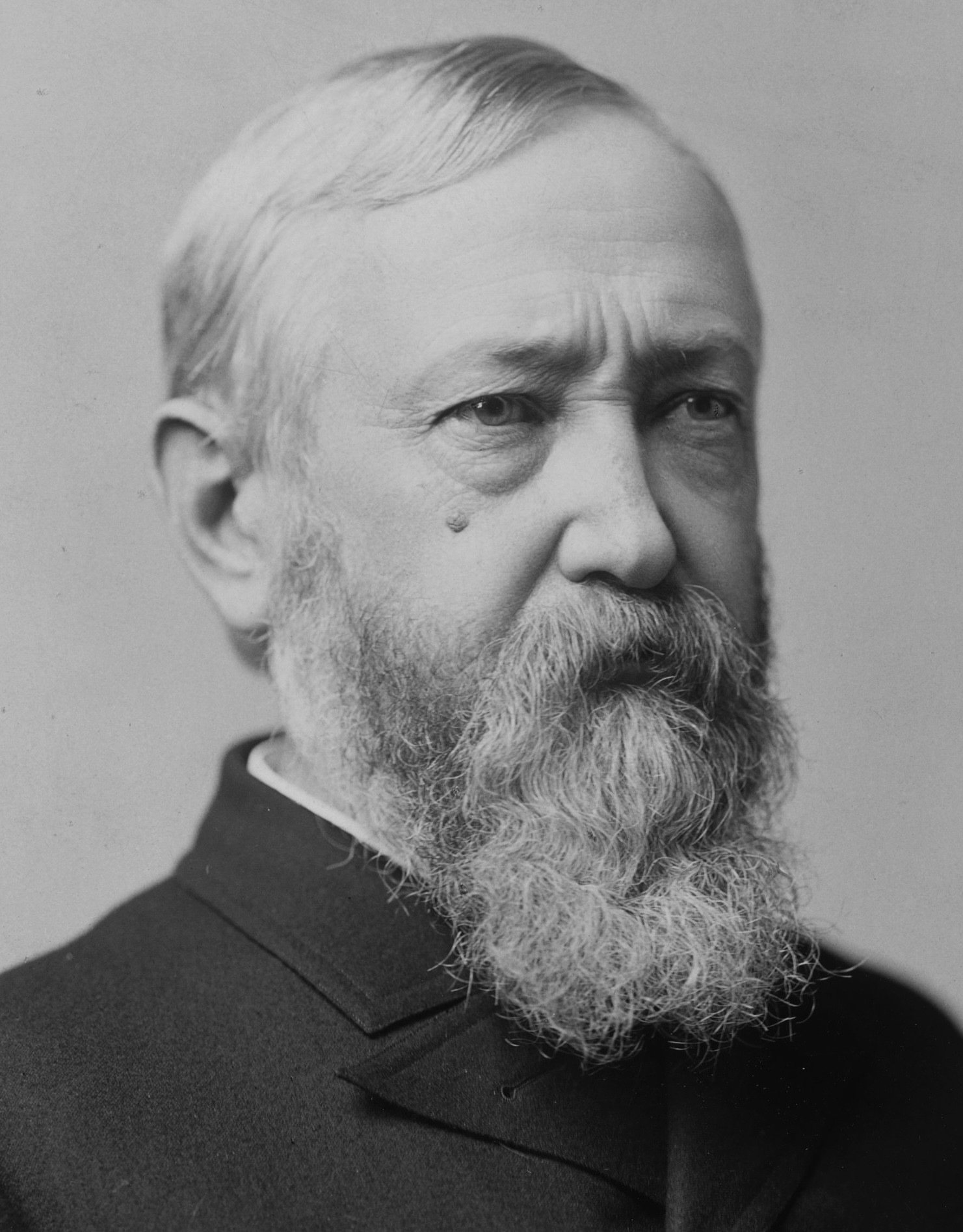
Nominee	Grover Cleveland	Benjamin Harrison
Party	Democratic	Republican
Home state	New York	Indiana
Running mate	Allen G. Thurman	Levi P. Morton
Electoral vote	9	0
Popular vote	65,824	13,736
Percentage	82.28%	17.17%
County results
Cleveland
50–60%
60–70%
70–80%
80–90%
90–100%
Harrison
70–80%
President before election
Grover Cleveland
Democratic
Elected President
Benjamin Harrison
Republican

The 1888 United States presidential election in South Carolina took place on November 6, 1888, as part of the 1888 United States presidential election. Voters chose 9 representatives, or electors to the Electoral College, who voted for president and vice president.

South Carolina voted for the Democratic nominee, incumbent President Grover Cleveland, over the Republican nominee, Benjamin Harrison. Cleveland won the state by a landslide margin of 65.11 percentage points.

== Results ==
General Election Results
Party	Pledged to	Elector	Votes
Democratic Party	Grover Cleveland	John T. Sloan, Jr.	65,825
Democratic Party	Grover Cleveland	George W. Gage	65,825
Democratic Party	Grover Cleveland	Lucas McIntosh	65,825
Democratic Party	Grover Cleveland	C. A. Douglass	65,824
Democratic Party	Grover Cleveland	Claude E. Sawyer	65,823
Democratic Party	Grover Cleveland	C. C. Culp	65,823
Democratic Party	Grover Cleveland	F. W. Wagener	65,822
Democratic Party	Grover Cleveland	W. O. Bradley	65,822
Democratic Party	Grover Cleveland	Richard Singleton	65,815
Republican Party	Benjamin Harrison	Eugene A. Webster	13,740
Republican Party	Benjamin Harrison	Edward J. Dickerson	13,740
Republican Party	Benjamin Harrison	John R. Tolbert	13,740
Republican Party	Benjamin Harrison	Thomas H. Saxon	13,740
Republican Party	Benjamin Harrison	Henry L. Shrewsbury	13,740
Republican Party	Benjamin Harrison	Edmund H. Deas	13,740
Republican Party	Benjamin Harrison	Ellery M. Brayton	13,736
Republican Party	Benjamin Harrison	Thomas B. Johnston	13,736
Republican Party	Benjamin Harrison	Zachariah E. Walker	13,654
Write-in	N/A	Scattering	437
Votes cast (Note: Based on totals for highest elector on each ticket)			80,002

=== Results by county ===
County	Stephen Grover Cleveland Democratic		Benjamin Harrison Republican		Various candidates Write-ins		Margin		Total votes cast
County	#	%	#	%	#	%	#	%	Total votes cast
Abbeville	2,985	97.39%	74	2.41%	6	0.20%	2,911	94.98%	3,065
Aiken	2,532	86.24%	404	13.76%			2,128	72.48%	2,936
Anderson	2,045	94.28%	124	5.72%			1,921	88.57%	2,169
Barnwell	2,905	78.49%	613	16.56%	183	4.94%	2,292	61.93%	3,701
Beaufort	509	22.34%	1,769	77.66%			-1,260	-55.31%	2,278
Berkeley	1,611	55.00%	1,318	45.00%			293	10.00%	2,929
Charleston	2,652	85.16%	435	13.97%	27	0.87%	2,217	71.19%	3,114
Chester	1,735	96.87%	42	2.35%	14	0.78%	1,693	94.53%	1,791
Chesterfield	1,871	91.36%	177	8.64%			1,694	82.71%	2,048
Clarendon	1,452	81.44%	331	18.56%			1,121	62.87%	1,783
Colleton	2,805	79.94%	704	20.06%			2,101	59.87%	3,509
Darlington	1,852	86.30%	294	13.70%			1,558	72.60%	2,146
Edgefield	3,142	98.31%	54	1.69%			3,088	96.62%	3,196
Fairfield	1,389	98.72%	9	0.64%	9	0.64%	1,380	98.08%	1,407
Georgetown	703	52.82%	628	47.18%			75	5.63%	1,331
Greenville	3,305	86.72%	456	11.97%	50	1.31%	2,849	74.76%	3,811
Hampton	1,398	79.75%	324	18.48%	31	1.77%	1,074	61.27%	1,753
Horry	1,241	77.37%	363	22.63%			878	54.74%	1,604
Kershaw	1,258	88.10%	170	11.90%			1,088	76.19%	1,428
Lancaster	1,740	88.37%	221	11.22%	8	0.41%	1,519	77.15%	1,969
Laurens	1,451	96.60%	36	2.40%	15	1.00%	1,415	94.21%	1,502
Lexington	1,903	94.77%	91	4.53%	14	0.70%	1,812	90.24%	2,008
Marion	2,417	76.29%	705	22.25%	46	1.45%	1,712	54.04%	3,168
Marlboro	1,231	99.03%	12	0.97%			1,219	98.07%	1,243
Newberry	1,729	96.38%	58	3.23%	7	0.39%	1,671	93.14%	1,794
Oconee	1,212	83.59%	231	15.93%	7	0.48%	981	67.66%	1,450
Orangeburg	3,044	72.32%	1,165	27.68%			1,879	44.64%	4,209
Pickens	858	90.03%	95	9.97%			763	80.06%	953
Richland	1,912	81.02%	443	18.77%	5	0.21%	1,469	62.25%	2,360
Spartanburg	3,344	86.61%	502	13.00%	15	0.39%	2,842	73.61%	3,861
Sumter	1,735	64.76%	944	35.24%			791	29.53%	2,679
Union	1,920	98.46%	30	1.54%			1,890	96.92%	1,950
Williamsburg	1,634	66.78%	813	33.22%			821	33.55%	2,447
York	2,305	95.64%	105	4.36%			2,200	91.29%	2,410
Totals	65,825	82.28%	13,740	17.17%	437	0.55%	52,085	65.11%	80,002

== See also ==
- United States presidential elections in South Carolina
