= 1836 United States presidential election in South Carolina =

- December 6, 1836
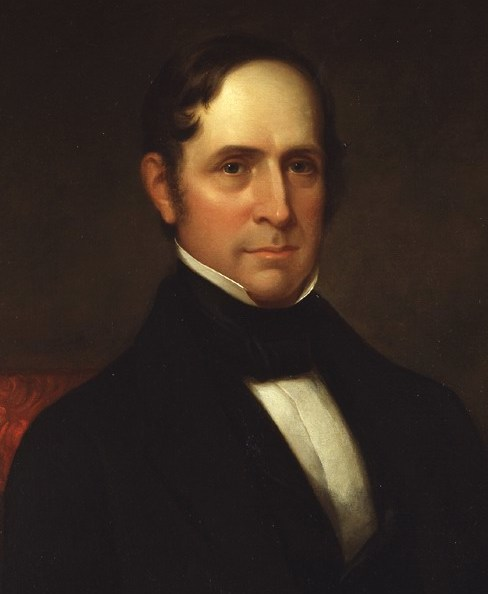
Nominee	Willie P. Mangum
Party	Whig
Alliance	Nullifier
Home state	North Carolina
Running mate	John Tyler
Electoral vote	11
President before election
Andrew Jackson
Democratic
Elected President
Martin Van Buren
Democratic

A presidential election was held in South Carolina on December 6, 1836 as part of the 1836 United States presidential election. The state legislature chose 11 representatives, or electors to the Electoral College, who voted for President and Vice President.

South Carolina cast 11 electoral votes for the Whig candidate Willie P. Mangum. These electors were chosen by the South Carolina General Assembly, the state legislature, rather than by popular vote.

== Results ==
1836 United States presidential election in South Carolina
Party	Candidate	Running mate	Popular vote		Electoral vote	
Party	Candidate	Running mate	Count	%	Count	%
Whig	Willie Person Mangum of North Carolina	John Tyler of Virginia	–	–	11	100.00%

== See also ==
- United States presidential elections in South Carolina
