= 1868 United States presidential election in South Carolina =

- November 3, 1868
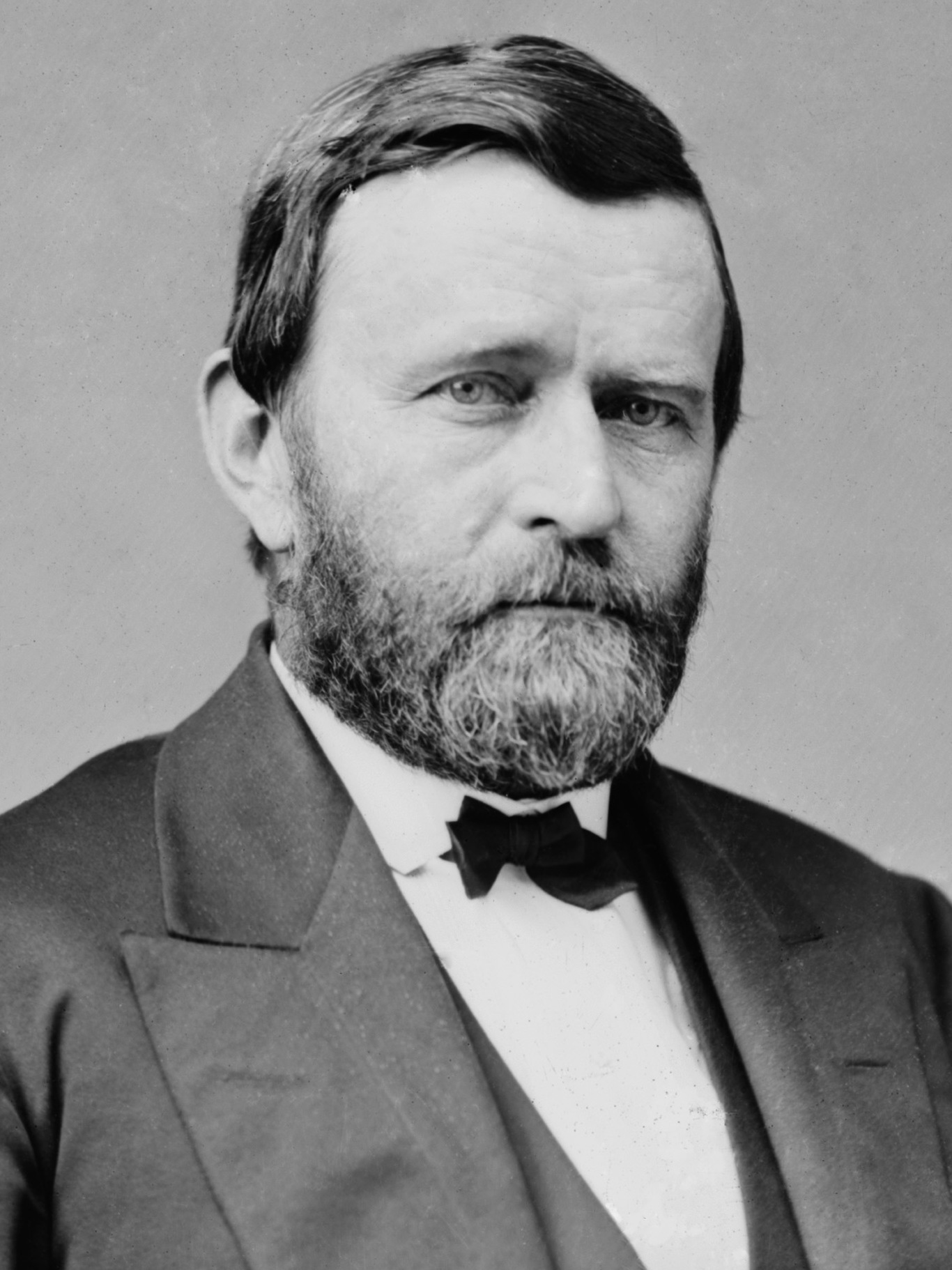

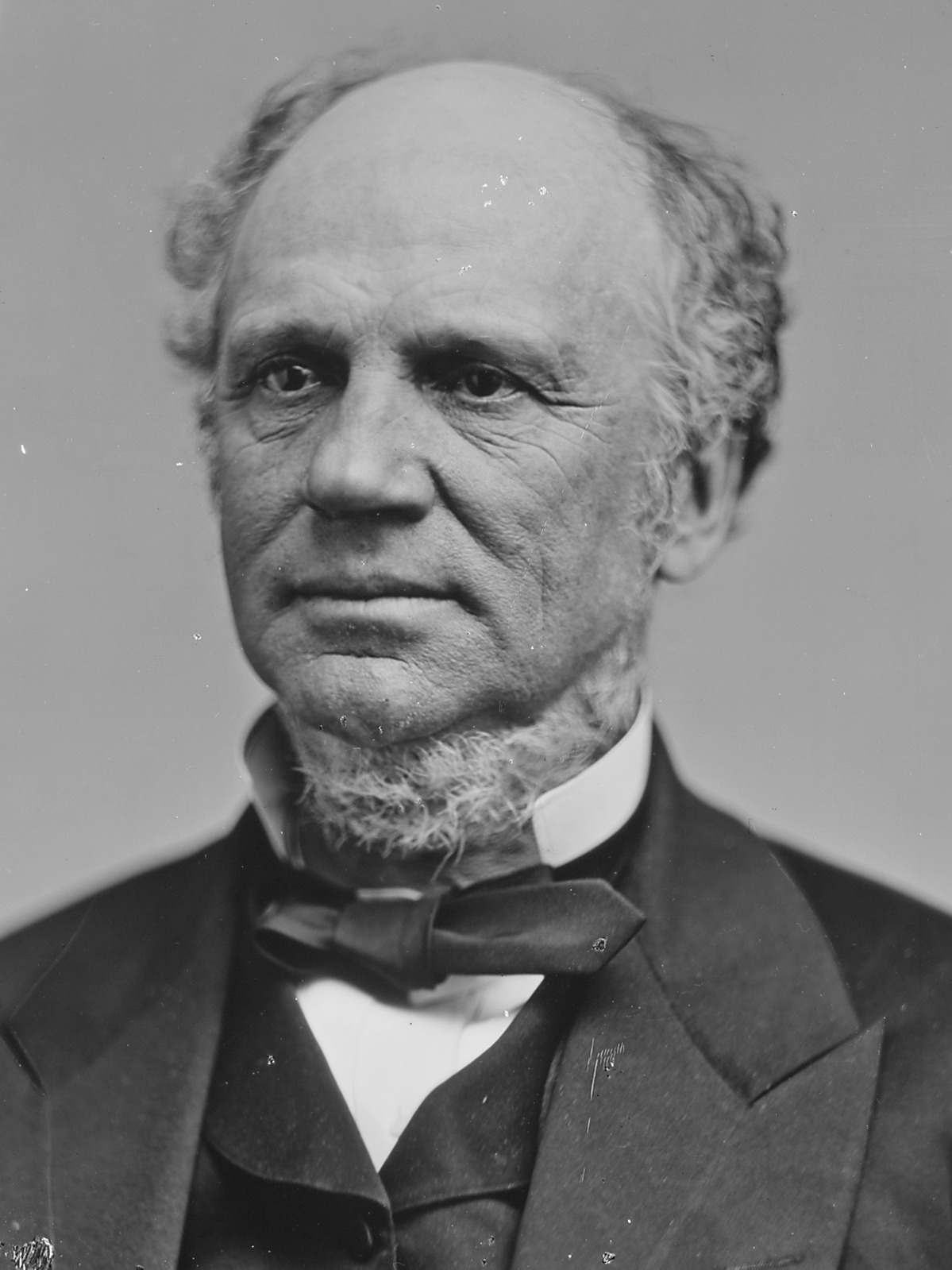
Nominee	Ulysses S. Grant	Horatio Seymour
Party	Republican	Democratic
Home state	Illinois	New York
Running mate	Schuyler Colfax	Francis Preston Blair Jr.
Electoral vote	6	0
Popular vote	62,301	45,237
Percentage	57.93%	42.07%
County results
Grant
50–60%
60–70%
70–80%
90–100%
Seymour
50–60%
60–70%
70–80%
President before election
Andrew Johnson
Democratic
Elected President
Ulysses S. Grant
Republican

The 1868 United States presidential election in South Carolina took place on November 3, 1868, as part of the 1868 United States presidential election. Voters chose six representatives, or electors to the Electoral College, who voted for president and vice president. This would be the first time in the state's history where the popular vote was used in the state during the presidential election, with previous elections having used the state legislature. Nearly all of the votes for Grant came from the newly enfranchised freedmen who were able to cast ballots for the first time with federal Reconstruction troops safeguarding the vote.

South Carolina voted for the Republican nominee, General Ulysses S. Grant, over the Democratic nominee, former Governor of New York Horatio Seymour. Grant won the state by a margin of 15.86%.

== Results ==
1868 United States presidential election in South Carolina
Party	Candidate	Running mate	Popular vote		Electoral vote	
Party	Candidate	Running mate	Count	%	Count	%
Republican	Ulysses S. Grant of Illinois	Schuyler Colfax of Indiana	62,301	57.93%	6	100.00%
Democratic	Horatio Seymour of New York	Francis Preston Blair Jr. of Missouri	45,237	42.07%	0	0.00%
Total			107,538	100.00%	6	100.00%

== See also ==
- United States presidential elections in South Carolina
