= 1796 United States presidential election in South Carolina =

- November 4 – December 7, 1796
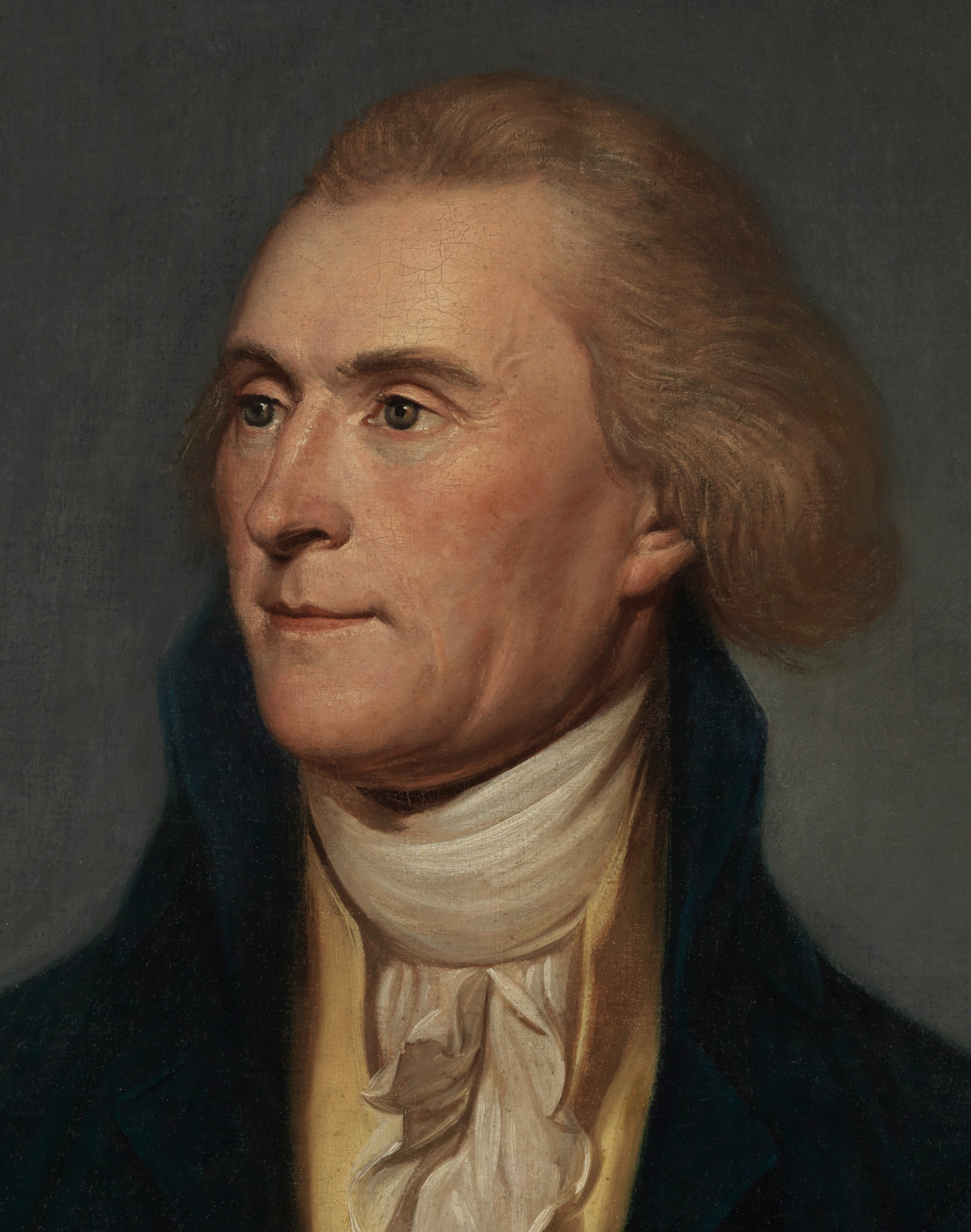

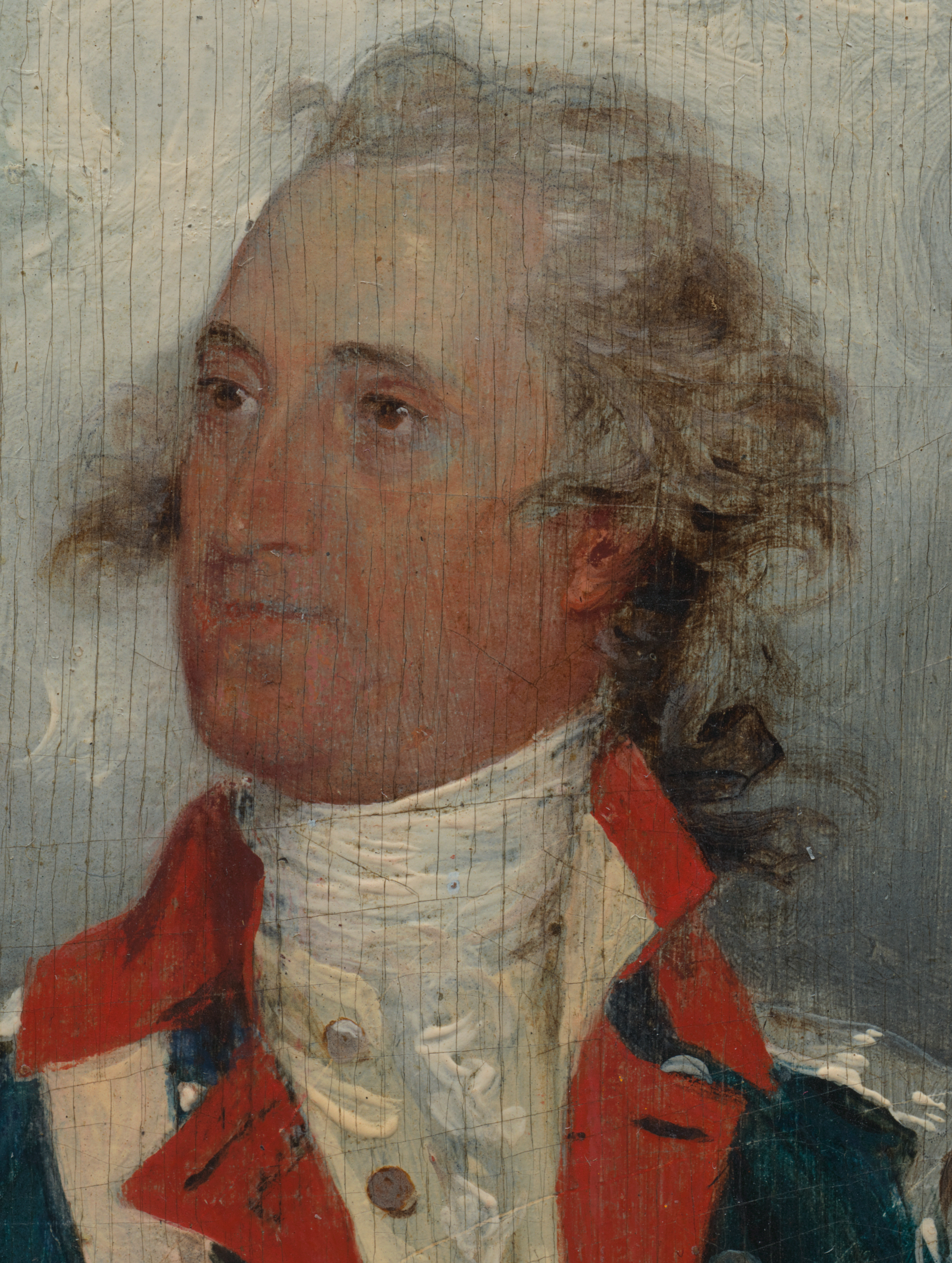
Nominee	Thomas Jefferson	Thomas Pinckney
Party	Democratic-Republican	Federalist
Home state	Virginia	South Carolina
Electoral vote	8	8
Percentage	100.00%	–
President before election
George Washington
Independent
Elected President
John Adams
Federalist

A presidential election was held in South Carolina between November 4 and December 7, 1796, as part of the 1796 United States presidential election. The state legislature chose eight electors for the Electoral College, who voted for President and Vice President individually.

During this election, South Carolina cast its eight electoral votes for former Secretary of State Thomas Jefferson.

== See also ==
- United States presidential elections in South Carolina
