= 1920 United States presidential election in South Carolina =

- November 2, 1920

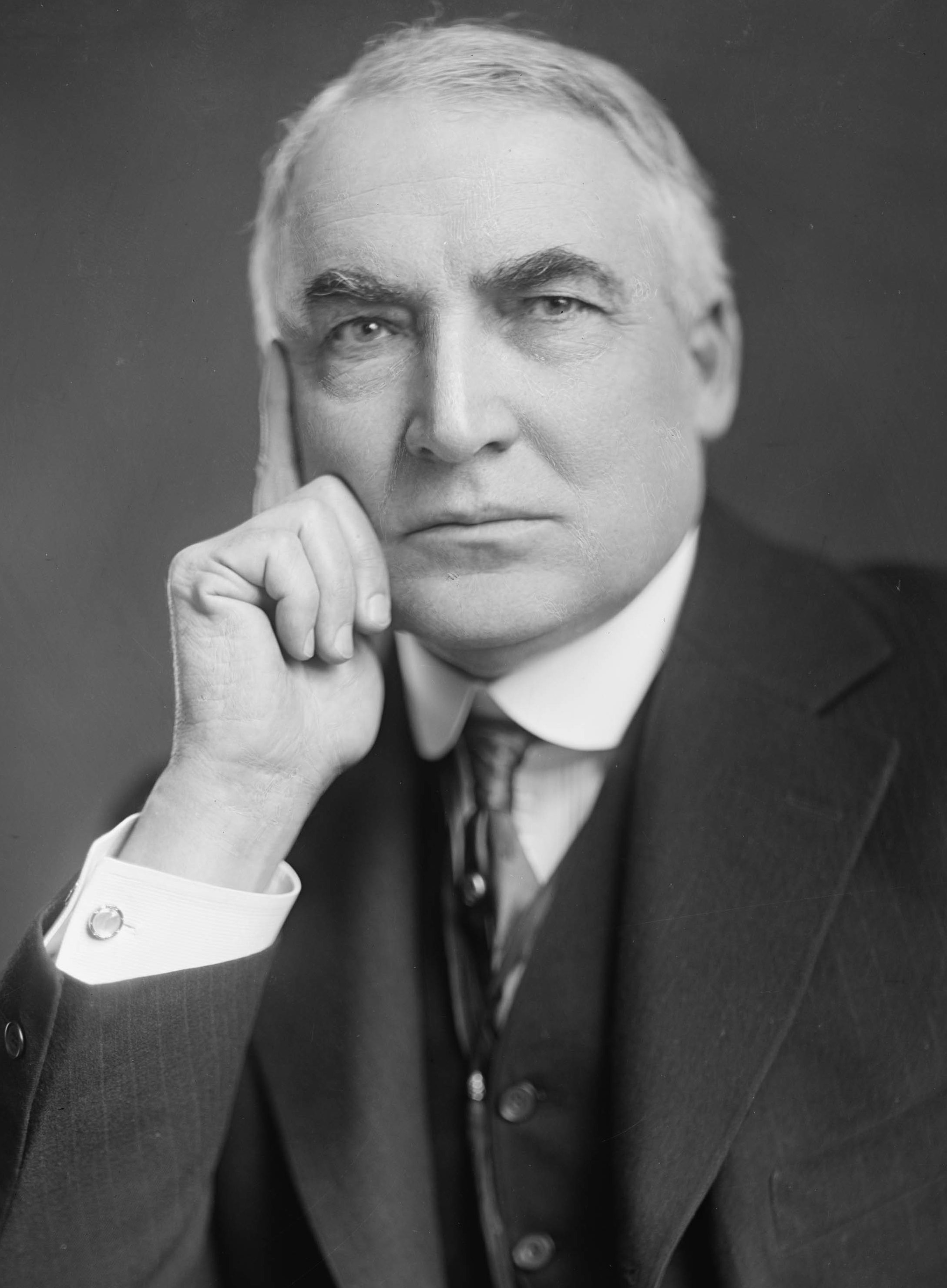
Nominee	James M. Cox	Warren G. Harding
Party	Democratic	Republican
Home state	Ohio	Ohio
Running mate	Franklin D. Roosevelt	Calvin Coolidge
Electoral vote	9	0
Popular vote	64,170	2,610
Percentage	96.05%	3.91%
County results
Cox
60–70%
80–90%
90–100%
President before election
Woodrow Wilson
Democratic
Elected President
Warren G. Harding
Republican

The 1920 United States presidential election in South Carolina took place on November 2, 1920, as part of the 1920 United States presidential election which was held throughout all contemporary 48 states. Voters chose 9 representatives, or electors to the Electoral College, who voted for president and vice president.

South Carolina voted for the Democratic nominee, Governor James M. Cox of Ohio, over Republican nominee, Senator Warren G. Harding of Ohio. Cox ran with Assistant Secretary of the Navy Franklin D. Roosevelt of New York, while Harding ran with Governor Calvin Coolidge of Massachusetts.

Cox won South Carolina by a landslide margin of 92.14%.

In the midst of a massive nationwide Republican landslide, South Carolina was a staggering 118.3% more Democratic than the national average.

== Results ==
1920 United States presidential election in South Carolina
Party	Candidate	Running mate	Popular vote		Electoral vote	
Party	Candidate	Running mate	Count	%	Count	%
Democratic	James Middleton Cox of Ohio	Franklin Delano Roosevelt of New York	64,170	96.05%	9	100.00%
Republican	Warren Gamaliel Harding of Ohio	Calvin Coolidge of Massachusetts	2,610	3.91%	0	0.00%
Socialist	Eugene Victor Debs of Indiana	Seymour Stedman of Illinois	28	0.04%	0	0.00%
Total			66,808	100.00%	9	100.00%
