= 1932 United States presidential election in South Carolina =

- November 8, 1932

Nominee	Franklin D. Roosevelt	Herbert Hoover
Party	Democratic	Republican
Home state	New York	California
Running mate	John Nance Garner	Charles Curtis
Electoral vote	8	0
Popular vote	102,347	1,978
Percentage	98.03%	1.89%
County results
Roosevelt
80–90%
90–100%
President before election
Herbert Hoover
Republican
Elected President
Franklin D. Roosevelt
Democratic

The 1932 United States presidential election in South Carolina took place on November 8, 1932, as part of the 1932 United States presidential election which was held throughout all contemporary 48 states. Voters chose 8 representatives, or electors to the Electoral College, who voted for president and vice president.

South Carolina voted for the Democratic nominee, Governor Franklin D. Roosevelt of New York, over the Republican nominee, incumbent President Herbert Hoover of California. Roosevelt ran with incumbent Speaker of the House John Nance Garner of Texas, while Hoover's running mate was incumbent Vice President Charles Curtis of Kansas.

Roosevelt won South Carolina almost unanimously, taking 98.03% of the vote to Hoover's 1.89%. He swept every county in the state with more than 80% of the vote, and all but one (historically Black Republican leaning Beaufort County) with greater than 90%. With a victory margin of 96.14%, South Carolina proved to be Roosevelt's strongest state in this election.

== Results ==
1932 United States presidential election in South Carolina
Party	Candidate	Running mate	Popular vote		Electoral vote	
Party	Candidate	Running mate	Count	%	Count	%
Democratic	Franklin Delano Roosevelt of New York	John Nance Garner of Texas	102,347	98.03%	8	100.00%
Republican	Herbert Hoover of California	Charles Curtis of Kansas	1,978	1.89%	0	0.00%
Socialist	Norman Thomas of New York	James Hudson Maurer of Pennsylvania	82	0.08%	0	0.00%
Total			104,407	100.00%	8	100.00%
