= Government and politics of South Carolina =

South Carolina Government
- Seal of South Carolina
- Formation: 1776; 250 years ago
- Founding document: South Carolina Constitution
- Jurisdiction: State of South Carolina

Legislative branch
- Legislature: General Assembly
- Meeting place: State House

Executive branch
- Leader: Governor
- Appointer: Elected At Large
- Headquarters: State House

Judicial branch
- Court: Supreme Court
- Seat: Columbia, SC

South Carolina government and politics cover the three different branches of government, as well as the state constitution, law enforcement agencies, federal representation, state finances, and state taxes. South Carolina is a state in the United States and was the eighth admitted to the Union. The state of South Carolina was preceded by the Crown Colony of South Carolina, a constitutional monarchy overthrown during the American Revolution. Presently, South Carolina's government is formed as a representative democracy.

South Carolina is a largely conservative, Republican state. Since the Declaration of Independence, South Carolina's politics have been controlled by three main parties: the Democratic-Republican Party in the early 1800s, the Democratic Party through most of the 19th and 20th centuries, and the Republican Party in the late 20th and early 21st centuries.

Like most Southern states, South Carolina consistently voted Democratic in the 19th century and much of the 20th century as a part of the Solid South. The Democratic block was largely maintained by the disenfranchisement of most black voters from 1865 to the passage of the Civil Rights Act of 1964. The Republican Party became competitive in the 1960 presidential election when Richard Nixon lost the state to John F. Kennedy by just two percentage points. In 1964, Barry Goldwater became the first Republican to win the state since Reconstruction.

Since the election of 1964, South Carolina has voted for the Republican party in every presidential election, with the exception of 1976 when Jimmy Carter, a southern Democrat, was elected president. However, in state-wide and local elections, conservative Democrats still won many races until the end of the 20th century. The last conservative Democratic governor to be elected in South Carolina was Jim Hodges in 1998, and the last conservative Democratic U.S. Senator to serve was Fritz Hollings until 2005. Until the 1990s, South Carolina had a majority Democratic representation in both the U.S. House of Representatives and the General Assembly of South Carolina. While South Carolina has shifted between the Democratic and Republican parties, politics in South Carolina has consistently been conservative. As of 2023, the Republican Party controls eight of nine state executive offices, both U.S. Senate seats, six of seven seats in the U.S. House of Representatives, and a majority in the South Carolina General Assembly.

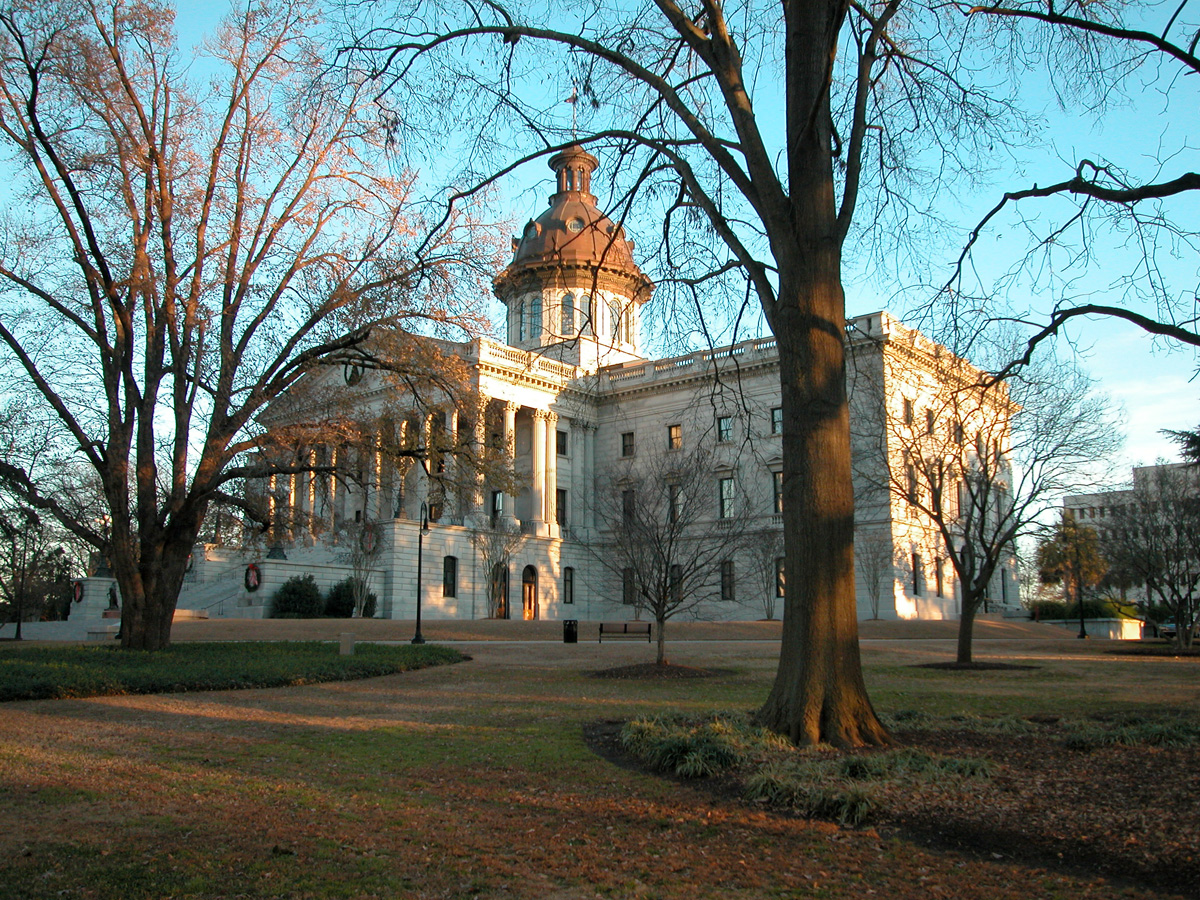
South Carolina State House

== Executive branch ==
=== Governor and lieutenant governor ===
The Governor of South Carolina is the chief executive of the state. The governor is elected to a four-year term and may serve up to two consecutive terms. The current governor is Republican Henry McMaster who succeeded to the office of Governor of South Carolina when Governor Nikki Haley resigned to become the United States Ambassador to the United Nations. The Lieutenant Governor is the second-in-command of the state's executive branch. The Lt. Governor assumes the office if the Governor is unable to fulfill his or her duties. Prior to the 2018 gubernatorial election, Governors and Lieutenant Governors were elected on separate tickets. But for the 2018 election and beyond, the governor and lieutenant governor run on the same ticket.

=== Elected Cabinet ===
The South Carolina Constitution provides for the separate election of eight executive officers, making a limited cabinet. This is a large number of elective offices compared to most states, which generally give the governor the executive power to appoint members of the cabinet.

South Carolina Executive Cabinet
Portfolio	Office Holder	Party	Since	Method of selection	Term
Governor of South Carolina	Henry McMaster	Republican	January 24, 2017	Elected at-large	4 years, renewable once consecutively
Lieutenant Governor of South Carolina	Pamela Evette	Republican	January 9, 2019	Elected at-large in tandem with the governor	4 years, no limit
Attorney General of South Carolina	Alan Wilson	Republican	January 12, 2011	Elected at-large	4 years, no limit
Commissioner of Agriculture	Hugh Weathers	Republican	September 14, 2004	Elected at-large	4 years, no limit
Comptroller General	Brian J. Gaines	Democratic	May 12, 2023 (Note: Gaines was appointed by the governor as a recess appointment following the resignation of Richard Eckstrom.)	Elected at-large	4 years, no limit
Secretary of State	Mark Hammond	Republican	January 15, 2003	Elected at-large	4 years, no limit
Treasurer	Curtis Loftis	Republican	January 12, 2011	Elected at-large	4 years, no limit
South Carolina Superintendent of Education	Ellen Weaver	Republican	January 11, 2023	Elected at-large	4 years, no limit

Each officer is elected at the same time as the governor. The separately elected positions allow for the possibility of multiple parties to be represented in the executive branch. The Governor's Cabinet also contains several appointed positions. In most cases, persons who fill cabinet-level positions are recommended by the governor and appointed by the Senate.

== Legislative branch ==
The South Carolina General Assembly is the state legislature. It is bicameral, consisting of a 124-member South Carolina House of Representatives and a 46-member South Carolina Senate. Representatives serve two-year terms and Senators serve four-year terms. The two houses meet in the South Carolina State House. Each house is currently controlled by the Republican Party.

Originally, each county elected one senator and at least one representative. The vast differences between rural and urban counties gave rural areas an outsized influence over state government. This state of affairs ended with the federal case of Reynolds v. Sims, which mandated that state legislative districts be drawn based on population, and that that counties’ representation must be roughly equal.

=== Historic Party Control ===
Below is a chart of party control in the South Carolina General Assembly since 1868.

== Judicial branch ==
The Family Court deals with all matters of domestic and family relationships, as well as generally maintaining exclusive jurisdiction over cases involving minors under the age of seventeen, excepting traffic and game law violations. Some criminal charges may come under Circuit Court jurisdiction.

The South Carolina Circuit Court is the trial court of general jurisdiction court for South Carolina. It consists of a civil division (the Court of Common Pleas) and a criminal division. (the Court of General Sessions). It is also a superior court, having limited appellate jurisdiction over appeals from the lower Probate Court, Magistrate's Court, and Municipal Court, and appeals from the Administrative Law Judge Division, which hears matters relating to state administrative and regulatory agencies. South Carolina's 46 counties are divided into 16 judicial circuits, and there are currently 46 judges. Circuit court judges are elected by the General Assembly to six-year terms.

The South Carolina Court of Appeals is the state intermediate appellate court. It hears all Circuit Court and Family Court appeals, excepting appeals that are within the seven classes of exclusive Supreme Court jurisdiction. The Court of Appeals is selected by the General Assembly to long six-year terms. The court comprises a chief judge, and eight associate judges, and may hear cases as the whole court, or as three panels with three judges each. The court may preside in any county.

The South Carolina Supreme Court is the state supreme court. The Chief Justice and four Associate Justices are elected to staggered ten-year terms. There are no limits on the number of terms a justice may serve, but there is a mandatory retirement age of 72. The overwhelming majority of vacancies on the Court occur when Justices reach this age, not through the refusal of the General Assembly to elect a sitting Justice to another term.

== Law ==
=== South Carolina Constitution ===
South Carolina has had seven constitutions:

- 1776: SC's first constitution
- 1778: Disestablished the Anglican Church, created a popularly elected upper house
- 1790: Expanded upcountry representation, further established General Assembly control over all aspects of government
- 1861: Confederate constitution
- 1865: Required to be readmitted to the Union, abolished property owning qualifications to vote, created popularly elected governor and granted veto power
- 1868: Only constitution to be ratified by popular vote, provided for public education, abolished property ownership as a qualification for office holding, created counties with home rule, abolished race as limit on male suffrage
- 1895: Effectively disenfranchised black voters, requiring poll taxes, and literacy tests, to register to vote. In 1900 African Americans were 58% of the state population. This exclusion of blacks from the political system was largely enforced until after passage of the Voting Rights Act of 1965, which authorized federal oversight and enforcement of voter registration and elections to ensure citizens could exercise their constitutional rights.

Since 1895, many residents have called for a new Constitution, one that is not based on the politics of a post–Civil War population. Governor Mark Sanford called for constitutional reform in his 2008 State of the State speech. Several hundred amendments have been made to the 1895 Constitution (in 1966 there were 330 amendments). Amendments have been created to comply with federal acts, and for many other issues. The volume of amendments makes South Carolina's constitution one of the longest in the nation.

=== Law enforcement agencies ===
- South Carolina Department of Public Safety
  - South Carolina Highway Patrol Division
  - South Carolina State Transport Police Division
  - South Carolina Bureau of Protective Services
- South Carolina Criminal Justice Academy
- South Carolina Department of Corrections
- SC Department of Corrections Training Academy
- SC Department of Corrections Tactical Teams (Rapid Response Team-S.O.R.T.-Sitcon)
- SC Department of Juvenile Justice
- South Carolina Department of Probation, Parole and Pardon Services
- South Carolina State Law Enforcement Division (SLED)
  - Homeland Security
- South Carolina Department of Natural Resources
  - South Carolina Climatology Department
- South Carolina Department of Alcohol and Other Drug Abuse Services
- South Carolina Department of Mental Health

== Local government ==
Historically, local governments in South Carolina have been fairly weak. For the most part, until the 1830s, towns were controlled by districts. According to historian Tom Downey, "the movement for incorporation initiated with a desire to implant order on unruly elements...which growing villages seemed to attract all too frequently." The initial charters gave towns regulatory power which they used to "appoint constables, levy fines, and enact ordinances." But, town councils were largely unable to pay their expenses with funds raised by just their fine revenue. In the late 1830s, the General Assembly started allowing select towns to tax property within their corporate limits.

The 1867 constitution established home rule for counties. This was changed under the 1895 Constitution, which made no provision for local government and effectively reduced counties to creatures of the state. Each county's delegation to the General Assembly also doubled as its county council. Under this system, the state senator from each county exercised the most power. Reynolds v. Sims required reapportionment according to the principle of "one man, one vote", which resulted in legislative districts crossing county lines. However, it was not until 1973 that the constitution was amended to provide for limited home rule at the county level. The Home Rule Act in 1975 implemented this. This law provided for elected councils in each county. Nonetheless, the legislature still devotes considerable time to local issues, and county legislative delegations still decide many matters that are handled at the county level in most other states.

Municipal governments may incorporate as cities or towns. However, there is no legal difference between the two.

Compared to cities in neighboring states, South Carolina cities are fairly small in size and population, since state law makes annexation difficult. To expand their borders, cities in South Carolina generally have three options when annexing contiguous land. First, if all property owners in a given area of land sign and file a petition with the municipality requesting annexation, the municipality may approve the petition and enact an ordinance declaring the annexation. Second, 75% of the freeholders in an area owning 75% or more of the assessed property value in that area may file a petition for annexation which the municipality may approve. More stringent petition requirements are added due to the lowered petitioner threshold. Finally, 25% of electors in an area can file a petition to initiate an annexation election which in turn requires a majority of voters to approve the annexation. This option previously required that 25% of freeholders file the petition for an election, but that was found to be a violation of the Equal Protection Clause.

== Federal and state representation ==
=== U.S. Senate ===
The current South Carolina delegation to the United States Senate:

Portrait	Class	Senator	Party	Since
	Senior	Tim Scott	Republican	January 2, 2013
	Junior	Darline Graham	Republican	July 13, 2026 (Note: Intra-term appointment by Governor Henry McMaster to replace her late brother, Lindsey Graham.) (Note: Certificate of Appointment from the Congressional Record says July 13th. See also https://www.senate.gov/senators/AppointedSenators.htm and https://bioguide.congress.gov/search/bio/G000608 which also both use July 13th]].)

=== U.S. House of Representatives ===
South Carolina currently has seven representatives in the United States House of Representatives:

Portrait	District	Representative	Party	Since
	District 1	Nancy Mace	Republican	January 3, 2021
	District 2	Joe Wilson	Republican	December 18, 2001
	District 3	Sheri Biggs	Republican	January 3, 2025
	District 4	William Timmons	Republican	January 3, 2019
	District 5	Ralph Norman	Republican	June 26, 2017
	District 6	Jim Clyburn	Democratic	January 3, 1993
	District 7	Russell Fry	Republican	January 3, 2023

A district map is found here.

=== Judiciary ===
South Carolina is part of the United States District Court for the District of South Carolina in the federal judiciary. The district's cases are appealed to the Richmond-based United States Court of Appeals for the Fourth Circuit.

== Finances ==
The state does not allow casino gambling, but it authorized the operation of video poker machines throughout the state. This yielded revenue of approximately $2 billion per year deposited into the state's coffers. But, in 2000 the legislature banned video poker, requiring machines to be shut off and removed from the state by July 8.

=== Taxes ===
The state's personal income tax has a maximum marginal tax rate of 7 percent on taxable income of $13,351 and above.

State sales tax revenues are used exclusively for education. South Carolina has a 6% state sales tax, but when combined with local and county taxes, South Carolina has the second-highest sales tax in the United States next to California. In Charleston, South Carolina, the tax rates equals 10.5% with state tax, county tax, local option tax, and the hospitality tax. Some items have different rates; e.g., the tax is 3% on unprepared food items and 7% on sleeping accommodation rentals. Individuals 85 or older get a one-percent exclusion from the general sales tax. Counties may impose an additional 1% local option sales tax and other local sales taxes, and local governments may impose a local accommodations tax of up to 3%.

South Carolina imposes a casual excise tax of 5% on the fair market value of all motor vehicles, motorcycles, boats, motors and airplanes transferred between individuals. The maximum casual excise tax is $500.

Property tax is administered and collected by local governments with assistance from the South Carolina Department of Revenue. Both real and personal property are subject to tax. Approximately two-thirds of county-levied property taxes are used for the support of public education. Municipalities levy a tax on property situated within the limits of the municipality for services provided by the municipality. The tax is paid by individuals, corporations and partnerships owning property within the state. Intangible personal property is exempt from taxation. There is no inheritance tax.

== Presidential elections through history ==
United States presidential election results for South Carolina
Year	Republican		Democratic		Third party(ies)	
Year	No.	%	No.	%	No.	%
1868	62,301	57.93%	45,237	42.07%	0	0.00%
1872	72,290	75.73%	22,699	23.78%	463	0.49%
1876	91,786	50.24%	90,897	49.76%	0	0.00%
1880	57,954	34.13%	111,236	65.51%	603	0.36%
1884	21,730	23.41%	69,845	75.25%	1,237	1.33%
1888	13,736	17.17%	65,824	82.28%	437	0.55%
1892	13,345	18.93%	54,680	77.56%	2,479	3.52%
1896	9,313	13.51%	58,801	85.30%	824	1.20%
1900	3,579	7.04%	47,233	92.96%	0	0.00%
1904	2,554	4.63%	52,563	95.36%	1	0.00%
1908	3,945	5.94%	62,288	93.84%	146	0.22%
1912	536	1.06%	48,357	95.94%	1,512	3.00%
1916	1,550	2.42%	61,846	96.71%	556	0.87%
1920	2,610	3.91%	64,170	96.05%	28	0.04%
1924	1,123	2.21%	49,008	96.56%	621	1.22%
1928	5,858	8.54%	62,700	91.39%	47	0.07%
1932	1,978	1.89%	102,347	98.03%	82	0.08%
1936	1,646	1.43%	113,791	98.57%	0	0.00%
1940	4,360	4.37%	95,470	95.63%	2	0.00%
1944	4,610	4.46%	90,601	87.64%	8,164	7.90%
1948	5,386	3.78%	34,423	24.14%	102,762	72.08%
1952	168,082	49.28%	173,004	50.72%	0	0.00%
1956	75,700	25.18%	136,372	45.37%	88,511	29.45%
1960	188,558	48.76%	198,129	51.24%	1	0.00%
1964	309,048	58.89%	215,700	41.10%	8	0.00%
1968	254,062	38.09%	197,486	29.61%	215,434	32.30%
1972	478,427	70.58%	189,270	27.92%	10,183	1.50%
1976	346,140	43.13%	450,825	56.17%	5,629	0.70%
1980	441,207	49.57%	427,560	48.04%	21,316	2.39%
1984	615,539	63.55%	344,470	35.57%	8,531	0.88%
1988	606,443	61.50%	370,554	37.58%	9,012	0.91%
1992	577,507	48.02%	479,514	39.88%	145,506	12.10%
1996	573,458	49.89%	504,051	43.85%	71,948	6.26%
2000	786,426	56.83%	566,039	40.91%	31,312	2.26%
2004	937,974	57.98%	661,699	40.90%	18,057	1.12%
2008	1,034,896	53.87%	862,449	44.90%	23,624	1.23%
2012	1,071,645	54.56%	865,941	44.09%	26,532	1.35%
2016	1,155,389	54.94%	855,373	40.67%	92,265	4.39%
2020	1,385,103	55.11%	1,091,541	43.43%	36,685	1.46%
2024	1,483,747	58.23%	1,028,452	40.36%	35,941	1.41%

Historic presidential elections in South Carolina (Note: This chart denotes which presidential candidate received South Carolina's electoral votes in each election. Victors are marked with checks and losers with "x".)
Election	Candidate	Party	Election winner?	Electoral Votes
1788	George Washington	None	✓	7
1792	George Washington	None	✓	8
1796	Thomas Jefferson	Democratic-Republican	✗	8
1800	Thomas Jefferson	Democratic-Republican	✓	8
1804	Thomas Jefferson	Democratic-Republican	✓	10
1808	James Madison	Democratic-Republican	✓	10
1812	James Madison	Democratic-Republican	✓	11
1816	James Monroe	Democratic-Republican	✓	11
1820	James Monroe	Democratic-Republican	✓	11
1824	Andrew Jackson	Democratic-Republican	✗	11
1828	Andrew Jackson	Democratic	✓	11
1832	John Floyd	Nullifier	✗	11
1836	Willie Mangum	Whig	✗	11
1840	Martin Van Buren	Democratic	✗	11
1844	James K. Polk	Democratic	✓	9
1848	Lewis Cass	Democratic	✗	9
1852	Franklin Pierce	Democratic	✓	8
1856	James Buchanan	Democratic	✓	8
1860	John C. Breckinridge	Democratic	✗	8
1864	United States Civil War			0
1868	Ulysses S. Grant	Republican	✓	6
1872	Ulysses S. Grant	Republican	✓	7
1876	Rutherford B. Hayes	Republican	✓	7
1880	Winfield S. Hancock	Democratic	✗	7
1884	Grover Cleveland	Democratic	✓	9
1888	Grover Cleveland	Democratic	✗	9
1892	Grover Cleveland	Democratic	✓	9
1896	William Jennings Bryan	Democratic Populist	✗	9
1900	William Jennings Bryan	Democratic Populist	✗	9
1900	Alton B. Parker	Democratic	✗	9
1908	William Jennings Bryan	Democratic	✗	9
1912	Woodrow Wilson	Democratic	✓	9
1916	Woodrow Wilson	Democratic	✓	9
1920	James M. Cox	Democratic	✗	9
1924	John W. Davis	Democratic	✗	9
1928	Alfred E. Smith	Democratic	✗	9
1932	Franklin D. Roosevelt	Democratic	✓	8
1936	Franklin D. Roosevelt	Democratic	✓	8
1940	Franklin D. Roosevelt	Democratic	✓	8
1944	Franklin D. Roosevelt	Democratic	✓	8
1948	Strom Thurmond	States' Rights Democrat	✗	8
1952	Adlai Stevenson	Democratic	✗	8
1956	Adlai Stevenson	Democratic	✗	8
1960	John F. Kennedy	Democratic	✓	8
1964	Barry Goldwater	Republican	✗	8
1968	Richard Nixon	Republican	✓	8
1972	Richard Nixon	Republican	✓	8
1976	Jimmy Carter	Democratic	✓	8
1980	Ronald Reagan	Republican	✓	8
1984	Ronald Reagan	Republican	✓	8
1988	George H. W. Bush	Republican	✓	8
1992	George H. W. Bush	Republican	✗	8
1996	Bob Dole	Republican	✗	8
2000	George W. Bush	Republican	✓	8
2004	George W. Bush	Republican	✓	8
2008	John McCain	Republican	✗	8
2012	Mitt Romney	Republican	✗	9
2016	Donald Trump	Republican	✓	9
2020	Donald Trump	Republican	✗	9
2024	Donald Trump	Republican	✓	9
