= 1948 United States presidential election in South Carolina =

- November 2, 1948
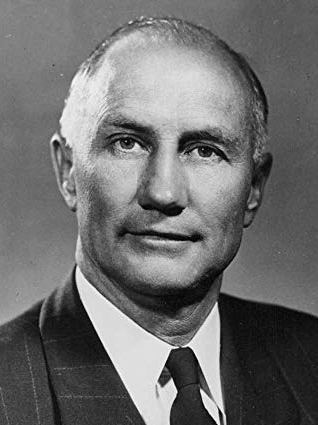

Nominee	Strom Thurmond	Harry S. Truman
Party	South Carolina Democratic	Democratic
Alliance	States' Rights Democratic
Home state	South Carolina	Missouri
Running mate	Fielding L. Wright	Alben Barkley
Electoral vote	8	0
Popular vote	102,607	34,423
Percentage	71.97%	24.14%

Thurmond
50–60%
60–70%
70–80%
80–90%
90–100%
Truman
50–60%
60–70%
President before election
Harry Truman
Democratic
Elected President
Harry Truman
Democratic

The 1948 United States presidential election in South Carolina took place on November 2, 1948, as part of the 1948 United States presidential election. State voters chose eight electors to the Electoral College, which selected the president and vice president. South Carolina was won by States' Rights Democratic candidate, South Carolina Governor Strom Thurmond, defeating the Democratic candidate, incumbent President Harry S. Truman, and New York Governor Thomas E. Dewey.

For six decades South Carolina had been a one-party state dominated by the Democratic Party. The Republican Party had been moribund due to the disfranchisement of blacks and the complete absence of other support bases as South Carolina completely lacked upland or German refugee whites opposed to secession. Between 1900 and 1944, no Republican presidential candidate ever obtained more than seven percent of the total presidential vote – a vote which in 1924 reached as low as 6.6 percent of the total voting-age population (or approximately 15 percent of the voting-age white population).

This absolute loyalty to the Democratic Party – so strong that even Catholic Al Smith in 1928 received over ninety percent of South Carolina's limited vote total at the same time as five former Confederate states voted for Herbert Hoover – began to break down with Henry A. Wallace's appointment as vice president and the 1943 Detroit race riots. The northern left wing of the Democratic Party became as a result of this riot committed to restoring black political rights, a policy vehemently opposed by most Southern Democrats as an infringement upon "states' rights". Tension widened much further when new President Harry Truman, himself a Southerner from Missouri, had described to him a number of horrifying lynchings and racial violence against black veterans, most crucially the beating and blinding of Isaac Woodard three hours after being discharged from the army. Truman, previously viewed as no friend of civil rights, came to believe that racial violence against blacks in the South was a threat to the United States' image abroad and its ability to win the Cold War against the radically egalitarian rhetoric of Communism.

The result was a major civil rights plan titled To Secure These Rights a year later, and a civil rights plank in the 1948 Democratic platform. Southern Democrats were enraged by these proposals and thus sought to form a "States' Rights" Democratic ticket, which would replace Truman as the official Democratic nominee. In South Carolina, Dixiecrats completely controlled the situation and achieved this as early as the state's May presidential primary. Consequently, Thurmond and Mississippi Governor Fielding Wright were listed as the official "Democratic" nominees. Thurmond won 76% of white voters.

== Predictions ==
Source	Ranking	As of
The Herald-Sun	Safe I (flip)	September 12, 1948
Chattanooga Daily Times	Safe I (flip)	October 15, 1948
The Evening Star	Certain I (flip)	October 20, 1948
The Montgomery Advertiser	Certain I (flip)	October 24, 1948
Mount Vernon Argus	Certain I (flip)	November 1, 1948
Oakland Tribune	Safe I (flip)	November 1, 1948

== Results ==
1948 United States presidential election in South Carolina
Party	Candidate	Running mate	Popular vote		Electoral vote	
Party	Candidate	Running mate	Count	%	Count	%
Dixiecrat	Strom Thurmond of South Carolina	Fielding L. Wright of Mississippi	102,607	71.97%	8	100.00%
Democratic	Harry S. Truman of Missouri (incumbent)	Alben W. Barkley of Kentucky	34,423	24.14%	0	0.00%
Republican	Thomas E. Dewey of New York	Earl Warren of California	5,386	3.78%	0	0.00%
Progressive	Henry A. Wallace of Iowa	Glen H. Taylor of Idaho	154	0.11%	0	0.00%
Write-in	Norman Thomas of New York	Tucker P. Smith of Michigan	1	0.00%	0	0.00%
Total			142,571	100.00%	8	100.00%

=== Results by county ===
County	Strom Thurmond States’ Rights/Democratic		Thomas E. Dewey Republican		Harry S. Truman Democratic		Henry A. Wallace Progressive		Margin (Note: Because Thurmond was the official Democratic nominee in South Carolina and he and Truman came in the first two places in all counties and the state as a whole, all margins given are Thurmond vote minus Truman vote and all percentage margins Thurmond percentage minus Truman percentage.)		Total votes cast
County	#	%	#	%	#	%	#	%	#	%	Total votes cast
Abbeville	787	73.97%	23	2.16%	254	23.87%	0	0.00%	533	50.09%	1,064
Aiken	4,607	86.94%	115	2.17%	572	10.79%	5	0.09%	4,035	76.15%	5,299
Allendale	1,041	93.78%	14	1.26%	55	4.95%	0	0.00%	986	88.83%	1,110
Anderson	1,342	33.32%	105	2.61%	2,581	64.08%	0	0.00%	-1,239	-30.76%	4,028
Bamberg	1,714	91.51%	34	1.82%	124	6.62%	1	0.05%	1,590	84.89%	1,873
Barnwell	1,920	93.02%	28	1.36%	115	5.57%	1	0.05%	1,805	87.45%	2,064
Beaufort	850	67.62%	150	11.93%	253	20.13%	4	0.32%	597	47.49%	1,257
Berkeley	1,534	79.94%	58	3.02%	323	16.83%	4	0.21%	1,211	63.11%	1,919
Calhoun	840	95.35%	4	0.45%	36	4.09%	1	0.11%	804	91.26%	881
Charleston	10,603	76.32%	562	4.05%	2,660	19.15%	68	0.49%	7,943	57.17%	13,893
Cherokee	1,075	61.15%	77	4.38%	605	34.41%	1	0.06%	470	26.73%	1,758
Chester	1,527	75.89%	48	2.39%	436	21.67%	1	0.05%	1,091	54.22%	2,012
Chesterfield	1,554	62.21%	31	1.24%	912	36.51%	1	0.04%	642	25.70%	2,498
Clarendon	1,467	92.26%	16	1.01%	107	6.73%	0	0.00%	1,360	85.53%	1,590
Colleton	2,337	89.92%	39	1.50%	223	8.58%	0	0.00%	2,114	81.14%	2,599
Darlington	1,930	69.93%	104	3.77%	726	26.30%	0	0.00%	1,204	43.63%	2,760
Dillon	967	53.72%	24	1.33%	808	44.89%	1	0.06%	159	8.83%	1,800
Dorchester	2,717	92.10%	85	2.88%	143	4.85%	5	0.17%	2,574	87.25%	2,950
Edgefield	1,797	98.20%	6	0.33%	27	1.48%	0	0.00%	1,770	96.72%	1,830
Fairfield	1,073	79.54%	63	4.67%	211	15.64%	2	0.15%	862	63.90%	1,349
Florence	3,729	72.97%	192	3.76%	1,189	23.27%	0	0.00%	2,540	49.71%	5,110
Georgetown	1,943	78.66%	92	3.72%	432	17.49%	3	0.12%	1,511	61.17%	2,470
Greenville	5,922	62.51%	789	8.33%	2,745	28.97%	18	0.19%	3,177	33.53%	9,474
Greenwood	2,508	83.21%	63	2.09%	440	14.60%	3	0.10%	2,068	68.61%	3,014
Hampton	1,530	94.33%	10	0.62%	81	4.99%	1	0.06%	1,449	89.33%	1,622
Horry	3,345	84.45%	113	2.85%	503	12.70%	0	0.00%	2,842	71.75%	3,961
Jasper	715	80.61%	31	3.49%	141	15.90%	0	0.00%	574	64.71%	887
Kershaw	1,615	82.15%	49	2.49%	302	15.36%	0	0.00%	1,313	66.79%	1,966
Lancaster	1,649	65.07%	30	1.18%	855	33.74%	0	0.00%	794	31.33%	2,534
Laurens	2,047	77.86%	69	2.62%	513	19.51%	0	0.00%	1,534	58.35%	2,629
Lee	1,155	86.65%	36	2.70%	142	10.65%	0	0.00%	1,013	75.99%	1,333
Lexington	2,237	78.19%	58	2.03%	566	19.78%	0	0.00%	1,671	58.41%	2,861
Marion	1,219	79.47%	14	0.91%	301	19.62%	0	0.00%	918	59.84%	1,534
Marlboro	1,083	73.23%	41	2.77%	354	23.94%	1	0.07%	729	49.29%	1,479
McCormick	713	95.96%	0	0.00%	30	4.04%	0	0.00%	683	91.92%	743
Newberry	2,758	87.25%	47	1.49%	349	11.04%	7	0.22%	2,409	76.21%	3,161
Oconee	1,155	59.02%	135	6.90%	666	34.03%	1	0.05%	489	24.99%	1,957
Orangeburg	3,160	83.98%	164	4.36%	435	11.56%	4	0.11%	2,725	72.42%	3,763
Pickens	1,344	69.14%	165	8.49%	435	22.38%	0	0.00%	909	46.76%	1,944
Richland	6,096	66.32%	670	7.29%	2,419	26.32%	7	0.08%	3,677	40.00%	9,192
Saluda	1,712	89.45%	15	0.78%	187	9.77%	0	0.00%	1,525	79.68%	1,914
Spartanburg	4,660	38.70%	627	5.21%	6,741	55.98%	13	0.11%	-2,081	-17.28%	12,041
Sumter	2,718	78.17%	154	4.43%	605	17.40%	0	0.00%	2,113	60.77%	3,477
Union	2,090	61.13%	46	1.35%	1,283	37.53%	0	0.00%	807	23.60%	3,419
Williamsburg	1,839	92.46%	23	1.16%	126	6.33%	1	0.05%	1,713	86.12%	1,989
York	1,983	55.67%	167	4.69%	1,412	39.64%	0	0.00%	571	16.03%	3,562
Totals	102,607	71.97%	5,386	3.78%	34,423	24.14%	154	0.11%	68,184	47.82%	142,570

==== Counties that flipped from Democratic to Dixiecrat ====
- Florence
- Horry
- McCormick
- Marlboro
- Abbeville
- Barnwell
- Cherokee
- Chester
- Chesterfield
- Darlington
- Dillon
- Greenwood
- Lancaster
- Laurens
- Oconee
- Saluda
- Union
- York
- Aiken
- Allendale
- Bamberg
- Beaufort
- Berkeley
- Charleston
- Calhoun
- Clarendon
- Colleton
- Dorchester
- Edgefield
- Fairfield
- Greenville
- Georgetown
- Hampton
- Jasper
- Kershaw
- Lexington
- Lee
- Marion
- Newberry
- Orangeburg
- Pickens
- Richland
- Sumter
- Williamsburg

== Analysis ==
Thurmond won his native state by a margin of 47.83 points, making him the first third-party candidate to carry the state since Southern Democrat John C. Breckinridge in 1860. This was the first time the state voted against the Democrats since 1876, and Truman was the first Democrat to win without the state since 1836.

Significant opposition to Thurmond came from the poor whites of the industrial upcountry, who rejected the Dixiecrats' opposition to public works and labor regulation. Many upcountry county parties and newspapers, especially in the two counties that backed Truman over Thurmond, alongside Senator Olin D. Johnston, also rejected bolting from the national party.

However, sufficiently few of these poorer whites voted that Thurmond was able to easily carry South Carolina, winning 44 of the state's 46 counties and over 71 percent of the total presidential vote. Thurmond exceeded 72 percent in all but twelve counties, and passed ninety percent in ten. This was the first time any county in South Carolina had voted against the national Democrats since 1900.

== See also ==
- United States presidential elections in South Carolina

== Works cited ==
- Black, Earl; Black, Merle (1992). The Vital South: How Presidents Are Elected. Harvard University Press. ISBN 0674941306.
