= 1980 United States presidential election in South Carolina =

- November 4, 1980

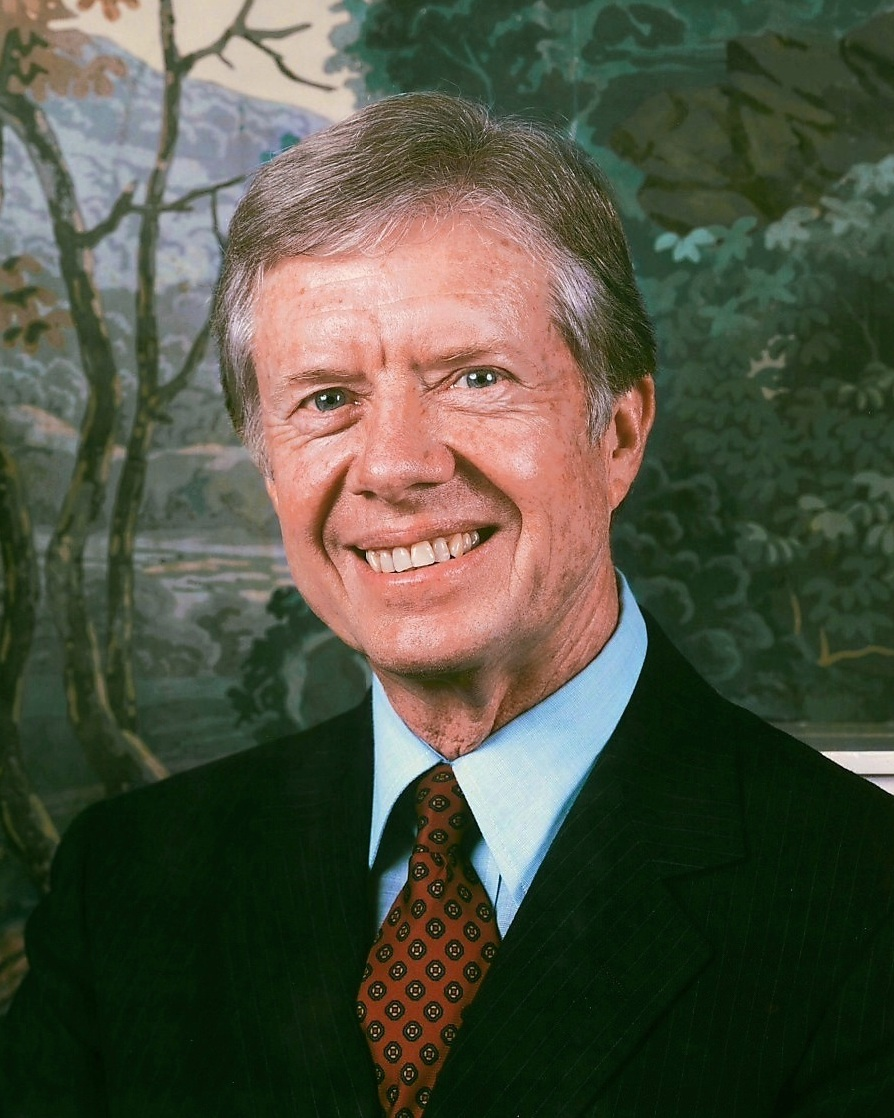
| Nominee | Ronald Reagan | Jimmy Carter |
| Party | Republican | Democratic |
| Home state | California | Georgia |
| Running mate | George H. W. Bush | Walter Mondale |
| Electoral vote | 8 | 0 |
| Popular vote | 441,207 | 427,560 |
| Percentage | 49.57% | 48.04% |
County results
Reagan
40–50%
50–60%
60–70%
Carter
40–50%
50–60%
60–70%
President before election
Jimmy Carter
Democratic
Elected President
Ronald Reagan
Republican

The 1980 United States presidential election in South Carolina took place on November 4, 1980. All 50 states and The District of Columbia were part of the 1980 United States presidential election. South Carolina voters chose eight electors to the Electoral College, who voted for president and vice president.

South Carolina was won by former California Governor Ronald Reagan (R) by a very slim margin of 1 point and a half. This remains the third-closest presidential election in South Carolina history after the controversial 1876 election and the transformative 1952 election.

== Campaign ==
The state weighed in for this election as 8% more Democratic than the national average, just 3% less than four years earlier. As of the 2024 presidential election, this is the last election in which the following counties voted for a Democratic presidential candidate: Anderson, Cherokee, Greenwood, Laurens, Oconee, Saluda and York.

Among white voters, 64% supported Reagan while 32% supported Carter.

Carter lost in eight of the ten most populous counties.

=== Predictions ===
| Source | Rating | As of |
|---|---|---|
| The Times and Democrat | Tossup | September 23, 1980 |
| Boca Raton News | Tossup | October 12, 1980 |
| The Charlotte Observer | Tossup | October 22, 1980 |
| Anderson Independent | Tossup | October 29, 1980 |
| Fort Worth Star-Telegram | Tossup | October 31, 1980 |
| The State | Tossup | November 2, 1980 |
| Daily Press | Lean D | November 3, 1980 |

== Results ==
Electoral results
| Presidential candidate | Party | Home state | Popular vote | | Electoral vote | Running mate | | |
| Presidential candidate | Party | Home state | Count | Percentage | Electoral vote | Vice-presidential candidate | Home state | Electoral vote |
|---|---|---|---|---|---|---|---|---|
| Ronald Reagan | Republican | California | 441,207 | 49.57% | 8 | George H. W. Bush | Texas | 8 |
| Jimmy Carter (incumbent) | Democratic | Georgia | 427,560 | 48.04% | 0 | Walter Mondale (incumbent) | Minnesota | 0 |
| John B. Anderson | Independent | Illinois | 14,150 | 1.59% | 0 | Patrick Lucey | Wisconsin | 0 |
| Ed Clark | Libertarian | California | 4,975 | 0.56% | 0 | David Koch | New York | 0 |
| John Rarick | American Independent | Louisiana | 1,815 | 0.20% | 0 | Eileen Shearer | California | 0 |
| — | Write-ins | — | 37 | 0.04% | 0 | — | — | 0 |
| Total | | | 890,105 | 100% | 8 | | | 8 |
| Needed to win | | | | | 270 | | | 270 |

=== Results by county ===
| County | Ronald Reagan Republican | | Jimmy Carter Democratic | | John B. Anderson Independent | | Various candidates Other parties | | Margin | | Total votes cast |
| County | # | % | # | % | # | % | # | % | # | % | Total votes cast |
|---|---|---|---|---|---|---|---|---|---|---|---|
| Abbeville | 2,361 | 35.60% | 4,049 | 61.05% | 111 | 1.67% | 111 | 1.67% | -1,688 | -25.45% | 6,632 |
| Aiken | 18,570 | 57.37% | 13,014 | 40.21% | 601 | 1.86% | 184 | 0.57% | 5,556 | 17.16% | 32,369 |
| Allendale | 1,182 | 29.62% | 2,778 | 69.62% | 17 | 0.43% | 13 | 0.33% | -1,596 | -40.00% | 3,990 |
| Anderson | 15,667 | 44.38% | 18,801 | 53.25% | 474 | 1.34% | 363 | 1.03% | -3,134 | -8.87% | 35,305 |
| Bamberg | 2,098 | 38.69% | 3,294 | 60.75% | 17 | 0.31% | 13 | 0.24% | -1,196 | -22.06% | 5,422 |
| Barnwell | 3,228 | 48.14% | 3,399 | 50.69% | 64 | 0.95% | 14 | 0.21% | -171 | -2.55% | 6,705 |
| Beaufort | 8,620 | 51.62% | 7,415 | 44.40% | 513 | 3.07% | 152 | 0.91% | 1,205 | 7.22% | 16,700 |
| Berkeley | 12,830 | 55.63% | 9,850 | 42.71% | 292 | 1.27% | 92 | 0.40% | 2,980 | 12.92% | 23,064 |
| Calhoun | 1,767 | 45.86% | 2,043 | 53.02% | 31 | 0.80% | 12 | 0.31% | -276 | -7.16% | 3,853 |
| Charleston | 44,111 | 55.13% | 32,727 | 40.90% | 2,222 | 2.78% | 952 | 1.19% | 11,384 | 14.23% | 80,012 |
| Cherokee | 5,379 | 43.32% | 6,889 | 55.48% | 86 | 0.69% | 64 | 0.52% | -1,510 | -12.16% | 12,418 |
| Chester | 3,104 | 37.12% | 5,145 | 61.52% | 87 | 1.04% | 27 | 0.32% | -2,041 | -24.40% | 8,363 |
| Chesterfield | 3,478 | 34.88% | 6,393 | 64.11% | 64 | 0.64% | 37 | 0.37% | -2,915 | -29.23% | 9,972 |
| Clarendon | 4,158 | 40.79% | 5,979 | 58.65% | 28 | 0.27% | 29 | 0.28% | -1,821 | -17.86% | 10,194 |
| Colleton | 4,719 | 44.76% | 5,745 | 54.49% | 58 | 0.55% | 21 | 0.20% | -1,026 | -9.73% | 10,543 |
| Darlington | 8,289 | 48.39% | 8,489 | 49.55% | 220 | 1.28% | 133 | 0.78% | -200 | -1.16% | 17,131 |
| Dillon | 3,385 | 42.31% | 4,518 | 56.48% | 59 | 0.74% | 38 | 0.48% | -1,133 | -14.17% | 8,000 |
| Dorchester | 10,893 | 59.53% | 7,237 | 39.55% | 140 | 0.77% | 28 | 0.15% | 3,656 | 19.98% | 18,298 |
| Edgefield | 2,415 | 40.68% | 3,465 | 58.36% | 29 | 0.49% | 28 | 0.47% | -1,050 | -17.68% | 5,937 |
| Fairfield | 2,098 | 33.18% | 4,153 | 65.68% | 37 | 0.59% | 35 | 0.55% | -2,055 | -32.50% | 6,323 |
| Florence | 17,069 | 50.19% | 16,391 | 48.19% | 348 | 1.02% | 203 | 0.60% | 678 | 2.00% | 34,011 |
| Georgetown | 5,151 | 42.78% | 6,701 | 55.65% | 148 | 1.23% | 42 | 0.35% | -1,550 | -12.87% | 12,042 |
| Greenville | 46,168 | 57.41% | 32,135 | 39.96% | 1,600 | 1.99% | 512 | 0.64% | 14,033 | 17.45% | 80,415 |
| Greenwood | 7,290 | 43.17% | 9,283 | 54.97% | 230 | 1.36% | 85 | 0.50% | -1,993 | -11.80% | 16,888 |
| Hampton | 2,217 | 33.58% | 4,329 | 65.56% | 35 | 0.53% | 22 | 0.33% | -2,112 | -31.98% | 6,603 |
| Horry | 14,323 | 49.62% | 13,888 | 48.12% | 528 | 1.83% | 125 | 0.43% | 435 | 1.50% | 28,864 |
| Jasper | 1,617 | 32.54% | 3,312 | 66.65% | 32 | 0.64% | 8 | 0.16% | -1,695 | -34.11% | 4,969 |
| Kershaw | 6,652 | 55.55% | 5,103 | 42.62% | 145 | 1.21% | 74 | 0.62% | 1,549 | 12.93% | 11,974 |
| Lancaster | 6,410 | 42.25% | 8,283 | 54.60% | 331 | 2.18% | 146 | 0.96% | -1,873 | -12.35% | 15,170 |
| Laurens | 6,036 | 42.83% | 7,856 | 55.74% | 125 | 0.89% | 76 | 0.54% | -1,820 | -12.91% | 14,093 |
| Lee | 2,952 | 37.48% | 4,818 | 61.17% | 18 | 0.23% | 89 | 1.13% | -1,866 | -23.69% | 7,877 |
| Lexington | 28,313 | 67.60% | 12,334 | 29.45% | 762 | 1.82% | 477 | 1.14% | 15,979 | 38.15% | 41,886 |
| McCormick | 797 | 30.60% | 1,774 | 68.10% | 22 | 0.84% | 12 | 0.46% | -977 | -37.50% | 2,605 |
| Marion | 3,321 | 37.73% | 5,379 | 61.12% | 75 | 0.85% | 26 | 0.30% | -2,058 | -23.39% | 8,801 |
| Marlboro | 2,585 | 32.15% | 5,378 | 66.89% | 52 | 0.65% | 25 | 0.31% | -2,793 | -34.74% | 8,040 |
| Newberry | 5,568 | 52.96% | 4,825 | 45.90% | 80 | 0.76% | 40 | 0.38% | 743 | 7.06% | 10,513 |
| Oconee | 5,651 | 41.58% | 7,677 | 56.49% | 189 | 1.39% | 74 | 0.54% | -2,026 | -14.91% | 13,591 |
| Orangeburg | 11,313 | 40.79% | 16,178 | 58.33% | 141 | 0.51% | 101 | 0.36% | -4,865 | -17.54% | 27,733 |
| Pickens | 9,575 | 53.42% | 7,789 | 43.46% | 402 | 2.24% | 157 | 0.88% | 1,786 | 9.96% | 17,923 |
| Richland | 36,337 | 49.87% | 33,158 | 45.50% | 1,812 | 2.49% | 1,562 | 2.14% | 3,179 | 4.37% | 72,869 |
| Saluda | 2,450 | 47.40% | 2,651 | 51.29% | 38 | 0.74% | 30 | 0.58% | -201 | -3.89% | 5,169 |
| Spartanburg | 30,092 | 51.12% | 27,245 | 46.28% | 941 | 1.60% | 591 | 1.00% | 2,847 | 4.84% | 58,869 |
| Sumter | 10,557 | 52.45% | 9,205 | 45.74% | 250 | 1.24% | 114 | 0.57% | 1,352 | 6.71% | 20,126 |
| Union | 4,035 | 38.59% | 6,274 | 60.00% | 93 | 0.89% | 54 | 0.52% | -2,239 | -21.41% | 10,456 |
| Williamsburg | 5,110 | 38.29% | 8,135 | 60.96% | 64 | 0.48% | 35 | 0.26% | -3,025 | -22.67% | 13,344 |
| York | 11,265 | 46.85% | 12,075 | 50.22% | 539 | 2.24% | 164 | 0.68% | -810 | -3.37% | 24,043 |
| Totals | 441,207 | 49.57% | 427,560 | 48.04% | 14,150 | 1.59% | 7,166 | 0.81% | 13,647 | 1.53% | 890,083 |

==== Counties that flipped from Democratic to Republican ====
- Beaufort
- Berkeley
- Charleston
- Dorchester
- Florence
- Horry
- Kershaw
- Newberry
- Pickens
- Richland
- Spartanburg
- Sumter

=== Results by congressional district ===
Reagan and Carter both won three congressional districts. Carter won a district that elected a Republican.

| District | Reagan | Carter | Representative |
|---|---|---|---|
| 1st | 53.7% | 44.4% | Mendel Jackson Davis |
| 1st | 53.7% | 44.4% | Thomas F. Hartnett |
| 2nd | 52.3% | 45.9% | Floyd Spence |
| 3rd | 48.2% | 50.3% | Butler Derrick |
| 4th | 54.7% | 43.5% | Carroll A. Campbell Jr. |
| 5th | 44.7% | 54.0% | Kenneth Lamar Holland |
| 6th | 44.8% | 54.2% | John Jenrette |
| 6th | 44.8% | 54.2% | John Light Napier |

== Works cited ==
- Black, Earl; Black, Merle (1992). The Vital South: How Presidents Are Elected. Harvard University Press. ISBN 0674941306.
- Moreland, Laurence; Steed, Robert; Baker, Tod, eds. (1991). The 1988 Presidential Election in the South: Continuity Amidst Change in Southern Party Politics. Praeger Publishers. ISBN 0275931455.
