= 1972 United States presidential election in South Carolina =

- November 7, 1972

Nominee	Richard Nixon	George McGovern
Party	Republican	Democratic
Alliance		United Citizens
Home state	California	South Dakota
Running mate	Spiro Agnew	Sargent Shriver
Electoral vote	8	0
Popular vote	478,427	189,270
Percentage	70.58%	27.92%
County results
Nixon
50–60%
60–70%
70–80%
80–90%
President before election
Richard Nixon
Republican
Elected President
Richard Nixon
Republican

The 1972 United States presidential election in South Carolina took place on November 7, 1972. All 50 states and the District of Columbia were part of the 1972 United States presidential election. South Carolina voters chose 8 electors to the Electoral College, who voted for president and vice president.

South Carolina overwhelmingly voted for the Republican nominees, incumbent President Richard Nixon of California and his running mate Vice President Spiro Agnew of Maryland. Nixon and Agnew defeated the Democratic nominees, Senator George McGovern of South Dakota and his running mate U.S. Ambassador Sargent Shriver of Maryland.

Nixon carried South Carolina with 70.58 percent of the vote to McGovern's 27.92 percent, a victory margin of 42.66 points. This election provided the Republican Party with its best presidential result in South Carolina since 1872 and constitutes the only presidential election where the Republican candidate carried every county in the state. Nixon was also the first Republican since 1872 to carry the state twice.

== Campaign ==
Among white voters, 85% supported Nixon while 13% supported McGovern. This is the only time, as of the 2024 presidential election, that Marlboro County has voted for a Republican presidential candidate since that county was founded in 1896, and the last time when Orangeburg County, Williamsburg County, Marion County, Fairfield County, Hampton County, Lee County, and Allendale County have voted for a Republican presidential candidate. McCormick County would not vote Republican again until Donald Trump won it in 2016. Meanwhile, Clarendon and Jasper counties would not do so until Trump’s 2020 and 2024 victories in the state, respectively.

=== Polls ===
Source	Rating	As of
Corvallis Gazette-Times	Safe R	September 19, 1972
The Bradenton Herald	Certain R	October 9, 1972
Sun Herald	Certain R	November 5, 1972

== Results ==
1972 United States presidential election in South Carolina
Party	Candidate	Votes	Percentage	Electoral votes
Republican	Richard Nixon (incumbent)	478,427	70.58%	8
Democratic/United Citizens	George McGovern	189,270 (Note: Fusion of votes for McGovern on the Democratic and United Citizens lines)	27.92%	0
Independent	John G. Schmitz	10,166	1.50%	0
Write-ins	Write-ins	17 (Note: These write-in votes were not separated by county, but given only as a state-wide total.)	0.00%	0
Totals		677,880	100.00%	8
Voter turnout				–

=== Results by county ===
County	Richard Nixon Republican		George McGovern Democratic		John G. Schmitz Independent		Margin		Total votes cast
County	#	%	#	%	#	%	#	%	Total votes cast
Abbeville	3,266	68.95%	1,349	28.48%	122	2.58%	1,917	40.47%	4,737
Aiken	21,117	77.05%	5,745	20.96%	545	1.99%	15,372	56.09%	27,407
Allendale	1,741	55.34%	1,386	44.06%	19	0.60%	355	11.28%	3,146
Anderson	17,514	75.19%	5,241	22.50%	537	2.31%	12,273	52.69%	23,292
Bamberg	2,537	59.65%	1,680	39.50%	36	0.85%	857	20.15%	4,253
Barnwell	3,955	71.71%	1,560	28.29%	0	0.00%	2,395	43.42%	5,515
Beaufort	5,929	64.12%	3,237	35.01%	81	0.88%	2,692	29.11%	9,247
Berkeley	9,345	66.66%	4,497	32.08%	177	1.26%	4,848	34.58%	14,019
Calhoun	1,867	60.91%	1,148	37.46%	50	1.63%	719	23.45%	3,065
Charleston	39,863	68.79%	16,855	29.09%	1,229	2.12%	23,008	39.70%	57,947
Cherokee	7,570	77.24%	2,107	21.50%	123	1.26%	5,463	55.74%	9,800
Chester	4,724	66.20%	2,352	32.96%	60	0.84%	2,372	33.24%	7,136
Chesterfield	5,230	63.56%	2,938	35.70%	61	0.74%	2,292	27.86%	8,229
Clarendon	3,958	54.34%	3,276	44.98%	50	0.69%	682	9.36%	7,284
Colleton	5,723	69.51%	2,376	28.86%	134	1.63%	3,347	40.65%	8,233
Darlington	11,756	72.04%	4,414	27.05%	149	0.91%	7,342	44.99%	16,319
Dillon	4,364	72.32%	1,604	26.58%	66	1.09%	2,760	45.74%	6,034
Dorchester	8,095	68.11%	3,606	30.34%	185	1.56%	4,489	37.77%	11,886
Edgefield	2,812	66.67%	1,326	31.44%	80	1.90%	1,486	35.23%	4,218
Fairfield	2,608	50.68%	2,492	48.43%	46	0.89%	116	2.25%	5,146
Florence	18,106	65.30%	9,455	34.10%	165	0.60%	8,651	31.20%	27,726
Georgetown	6,114	57.27%	4,446	41.64%	116	1.09%	1,668	15.63%	10,676
Greenville	46,360	79.62%	10,143	17.42%	1,726	2.96%	36,217	62.20%	58,229
Greenwood	9,370	72.22%	3,400	26.20%	205	1.58%	5,970	46.02%	12,975
Hampton	2,891	57.56%	2,086	41.53%	46	0.92%	805	16.03%	5,023
Horry	15,324	76.84%	4,437	22.25%	183	0.92%	10,887	54.59%	19,944
Jasper	1,650	57.21%	1,203	41.71%	31	1.07%	447	15.50%	2,884
Kershaw	8,035	74.79%	2,531	23.56%	178	1.66%	5,504	51.23%	10,744
Lancaster	9,016	77.86%	2,461	21.25%	103	0.89%	6,555	56.61%	11,580
Laurens	8,141	74.46%	2,650	24.24%	142	1.30%	5,491	50.22%	10,933
Lee	3,076	60.31%	1,996	39.14%	28	0.55%	1,080	21.17%	5,100
Lexington	25,327	84.75%	4,069	13.62%	490	1.64%	21,258	71.13%	29,886
Marion	4,719	64.66%	2,545	34.87%	34	0.47%	2,174	29.79%	7,298
Marlboro	3,838	65.58%	1,999	34.16%	15	0.26%	1,839	31.42%	5,852
McCormick	1,302	60.22%	844	39.04%	16	0.74%	458	21.18%	2,162
Newberry	7,325	76.94%	2,035	21.37%	161	1.69%	5,290	55.57%	9,521
Oconee	6,824	78.19%	1,740	19.94%	164	1.88%	5,084	58.25%	8,728
Orangeburg	11,711	59.31%	7,652	38.75%	382	1.93%	4,059	20.56%	19,745
Pickens	11,776	82.37%	2,255	15.77%	265	1.85%	9,521	66.60%	14,296
Richland	39,746	64.11%	21,462	34.62%	787	1.27%	18,284	29.49%	61,995
Saluda	3,095	73.85%	1,022	24.39%	74	1.77%	2,073	49.46%	4,191
Spartanburg	31,308	75.34%	9,586	23.07%	662	1.59%	21,722	52.27%	41,556
Sumter	10,892	64.83%	5,801	34.53%	107	0.64%	5,091	30.30%	16,800
Union	8,337	75.35%	2,676	24.18%	52	0.47%	5,661	51.17%	11,065
Williamsburg	5,729	52.01%	5,213	47.33%	73	0.66%	516	4.68%	11,015
York	14,441	68.68%	6,374	30.31%	211	1.00%	8,067	38.37%	21,026
Totals	478,427	70.58%	189,270	27.92%	10,166	1.50%	289,157	42.66%	677,880

== Works cited ==
- Black, Earl; Black, Merle (1992). The Vital South: How Presidents Are Elected. Harvard University Press. ISBN 0674941306.
