= 1964 United States presidential election in South Carolina =

- November 3, 1964

Nominee	Barry Goldwater	Lyndon B. Johnson
Party	Republican	Democratic
Home state	Arizona	Texas
Running mate	William E. Miller	Hubert Humphrey
Electoral vote	8	0
Popular vote	309,048	215,700
Percentage	58.89%	41.10%

Goldwater
50–60%
60–70%
70–80%
Johnson
50–60%
60–70%
President before election
Lyndon B. Johnson
Democratic
Elected President
Lyndon B. Johnson
Democratic

The 1964 United States presidential election in South Carolina took place on November 3, 1964, as part of the 1964 United States presidential election. South Carolina voters chose 8 representatives, or electors, to the Electoral College, who voted for president and vice president.

== Background ==
Between 1900 and 1948, no Republican presidential candidate ever obtained more than seven percent of the total presidential vote – a vote which in 1924 reached as low as 6.6 percent of the total voting-age population. South Carolina was a one-party state dominated by the Democrats due to the disfranchisement of black voters.

Following Harry S. Truman's To Secure These Rights in 1947, the following year South Carolina's Governor Strom Thurmond led almost all of the state Democratic machinery into the States' Rights Democratic Party (Dixiecrats). As the Dixiecrat presidential candidate, Thurmond won 71 percent of the state's limited electorate and every county except poor white industrial Anderson and Spartanburg. During the 1950s, the state's wealthier and more urbanized whites became extremely disenchanted with the national Democratic Party and to a lesser extent with the federal administration of Republican Dwight D. Eisenhower.

== Campaign ==
Roger Milliken invited Barry Goldwater to speak in South Carolina in 1959, and it was televised in the entire state. Milliken later financially supported Goldwater's 1964 presidential campaign. During the 1950s, wealthy textile mill owners in the upcountry developed a grassroots state Republican Party dedicated to the tenets of the John Birch Society. This group nominated the most conservative delegation at the party's 1960 convention. These wealthy businessmen would merge with hardline segregationists to draft Barry Goldwater for the Republican nomination in 1960 and join forces therein by the time of the next presidential election.

U.S. Senator Strom Thurmond left the Democratic Party in September, to join the Republicans. Goldwater gave a televised speech in Columbia, South Carolina, that featured segregationist politicians on-stage with him, including Thurmond, Iris Faircloth Blitch, James F. Byrnes, James H. Gray Sr., Albert Watson, and John Bell Williams, in which he criticized the Civil Rights Act.

The Democratic Party, for its part, had struggled bitterly over whether to select electors pledged to incumbent President Lyndon Johnson due to his support for civil rights and desegregation; however, like Georgia, Louisiana and Mississippi, South Carolina chose Democratic electors pledged to LBJ. President Johnson did not campaign in the state, being hopeful that a black registration increased by more than Kennedy's 1960 margin and support from economically liberal Senator Olin Johnston would help him win without campaigning.

Early polls in South Carolina gave a substantial lead to Goldwater, but by the end of October, the state was viewed as similarly close to the 1952 and 1960 races where the Democrats won by under ten thousand votes. Goldwater received 70% of the white vote.

== Results ==
1964 United States presidential election in South Carolina
Party	Candidate	Votes	%
Republican	Barry Goldwater	309,048	58.89%
Democratic	Lyndon B. Johnson (inc.)	215,700	41.10%
Write-in	—	8	0.00%
Total votes		524,756	100%

=== Results by county ===
County	Barry Goldwater Republican		Lyndon B. Johnson Democratic		Margin		Total votes cast
County	#	%	#	%	#	%	Total votes cast
Abbeville	1,448	35.00%	2,689	65.00%	−1,241	−30.00%	4,137
Aiken	17,467	69.62%	7,622	30.38%	9,845	39.24%	25,089
Allendale	1,740	69.27%	772	30.73%	968	38.54%	2,512
Anderson	8,398	41.85%	11,670	58.15%	−3,272	−16.30%	20,068
Bamberg	2,366	62.51%	1,419	37.49%	947	25.02%	3,785
Barnwell	3,670	72.64%	1,382	27.36%	2,288	45.28%	5,052
Beaufort	3,432	55.54%	2,747	44.46%	685	11.08%	6,179
Berkeley	6,100	63.30%	3,537	36.70%	2,563	26.60%	9,637
Calhoun	1,591	72.22%	612	27.78%	979	44.44%	2,203
Charleston	32,509	69.06%	14,564	30.94%	17,945	38.12%	47,073
Cherokee	3,627	46.00%	4,258	54.00%	−631	−8.00%	7,885
Chester	2,915	42.89%	3,882	57.11%	−967	−14.22%	6,797
Chesterfield	2,449	34.58%	4,634	65.42%	−2,185	−30.84%	7,083
Clarendon	2,960	78.06%	832	21.94%	2,128	56.12%	3,792
Colleton	4,637	69.33%	2,051	30.67%	2,586	38.66%	6,688
Darlington	6,717	57.28%	5,010	42.72%	1,707	14.56%	11,727
Dillon	2,742	49.72%	2,773	50.28%	−31	−0.56%	5,515
Dorchester	5,109	76.11%	1,604	23.89%	3,505	52.22%	6,713
Edgefield	2,489	75.13%	824	24.87%	1,665	50.26%	3,313
Fairfield	1,997	43.18%	2,628	56.82%	−631	−13.64%	4,625
Florence	10,346	59.11%	7,157	40.89%	3,189	18.22%	17,503
Georgetown	4,705	57.89%	3,423	42.11%	1,282	15.78%	8,128
Greenville	29,358	62.96%	17,275	37.04%	12,083	25.92%	46,633
Greenwood	5,653	50.78%	5,479	49.22%	174	1.56%	11,132
Hampton	2,259	61.09%	1,439	38.91%	820	22.18%	3,698
Horry	8,293	60.37%	5,444	39.63%	2,849	20.74%	13,737
Jasper	1,593	61.39%	1,002	38.61%	591	22.78%	2,595
Kershaw	5,617	63.94%	3,168	36.06%	2,449	27.88%	8,785
Lancaster	4,742	48.83%	4,970	51.17%	−228	−2.34%	9,712
Laurens	5,081	53.79%	4,365	46.21%	716	7.58%	9,446
Lee	2,489	68.29%	1,156	31.71%	1,333	36.58%	3,645
Lexington	12,041	71.47%	4,807	28.53%	7,234	42.94%	16,848
Marion	3,197	60.98%	2,046	39.02%	1,151	21.96%	5,243
Marlboro	1,864	43.49%	2,422	56.51%	−558	−13.02%	4,286
McCormick	939	65.34%	498	34.66%	441	30.68%	1,437
Newberry	5,571	63.35%	3,222	36.64%	2,349	26.71%	8,794 (Note: One write-in vote was recorded from this county.)
Oconee	2,712	32.79%	5,560	67.21%	−2,848	−34.42%	8,272
Orangeburg	10,456	65.09%	5,607	34.91%	4,849	30.18%	16,063
Pickens	5,882	62.63%	3,506	37.33%	2,376	25.30%	9,391 (Note: 3 write-in votes were recorded from this county.)
Richland	27,306	60.35%	17,939	39.65%	9,367	20.70%	45,245
Saluda	2,524	64.17%	1,409	35.83%	1,115	28.34%	3,933
Spartanburg	18,411	47.89%	20,034	52.11%	−1,623	−4.22%	38,445
Sumter	7,729	67.19%	3,775	32.81%	3,954	34.38%	11,504
Union	3,815	49.50%	3,892	50.50%	−77	−1.00%	7,707
Williamsburg	4,810	68.15%	2,248	31.85%	2,562	36.30%	7,058
York	7,292	46.62%	8,346	53.36%	−1,054	−6.74%	15,642 (Note: 4 write-in votes were recorded from this county.)
Totals	309,048	58.89%	215,700	41.10%	93,348	17.79%	524,756

=== Results by congressional district ===
Goldwater carried 5 of the 6 congressional districts, which all elected Democrats.

District	Goldwater	Johnson
1st	67.9%	32.1%
2nd	65.7%	34.3%
3rd	50.5%	49.5%
4th	55.9%	44.1%
5th	47.6%	52.4%
6th	58.8%	41.2%

== Analysis ==
The swing away from Johnson was general except in a few areas of substantial black voter registration increases, and Goldwater's lowcountry dominance easily offset Johnson's narrow edge amongst the poor whites of the upcountry who, despite their hostility to Johnson's civil rights measures, saw Goldwater as a Dixiecrat-style conservative committed to privatization of services poor whites viewed essential. South Carolina was one of five states that swung more Republican in 1964, alongside Louisiana, Mississippi, Georgia, and Alabama. After narrow losses in 1952 and 1960, Goldwater became the first Republican presidential candidate to carry South Carolina since Rutherford B. Hayes in 1876.

== Works cited ==
- Black, Earl; Black, Merle (1992). The Vital South: How Presidents Are Elected. Harvard University Press. ISBN 0674941306.
