= 1968 United States presidential election in South Carolina =

- November 5, 1968

Nominee	Richard Nixon	George Wallace	Hubert Humphrey
Party	Republican	"Nominated by Petition"	Democratic
Alliance		American Independent
Home state	New York (Note: Although he was born in California and he served as a U.S. senator from California, in 1968 Richard Nixon's official state of residence was New York, because he moved there to practice law after his defeat in the 1962 California gubernatorial election. During his first term as president, Nixon re-established his residency in California. Consequently, most reliable reference books list Nixon's home state as New York in the 1968 election and his home state as California in the 1972 (and 1960) election.)	Alabama	Minnesota
Running mate	Spiro Agnew	Curtis LeMay	Edmund Muskie
Electoral vote	8	0	0
Popular vote	254,062	215,430	197,486
Percentage	38.09%	32.30%	29.61%

Nixon
30–40%
40–50%
50–60%
Wallace
30–40%
40–50%
50–60%
Humphrey
30–40%
40–50%
50–60%
President before election
Lyndon B. Johnson
Democratic
Elected President
Richard Nixon
Republican

The 1968 United States presidential election in South Carolina took place on November 5, 1968. All 50 states and the District of Columbia were part of the 1968 United States presidential election. South Carolina voters chose 8 electors to the Electoral College, who voted for president and vice president.

For six decades up to 1950, South Carolina was a one-party state dominated by the Democratic Party. The Republican Party had been moribund due to the disfranchisement of Blacks and the complete absence of other support bases, as South Carolina completely lacked upland or German refugee whites opposed to secession.

Between 1900 and 1948, no Republican presidential candidate ever obtained more than seven percent of the total presidential vote – a vote which in 1924 reached as low as 6.6 percent of the total voting-age population or approximately 15 percent of the voting-age white population. South Carolina was the only state to swing more Democratic compared to 1964, largely due to Wallace's presence on the ballot. Among white voters, 48% supported Nixon, 41% supported Wallace, and 12% supported Humphrey.

South Carolina was the only Deep South state not to support Wallace in this election. It also began a near-perfect streak of voting the same way as North Carolina, with the two states only diverging in 2008.

== Campaign ==
Although Nixon ignored the other Deep South states because he knew that he had no chance of competing with George Wallace, in South Carolina Senator Strom Thurmond, believing Wallace could not win the election and that northeastern urban liberalism would continue to dominate if he endorsed Wallace, took the stump for Nixon in South Carolina. The result was that Wallace's support in South Carolina plummeted rapidly, although in early September the Alabama governor predicted he would carry the state, an opinion backed up by early polling in mid-September. Other polls, however, had the race very close between the three candidates. Nixon himself campaigned in the state, aided by Thurmond, at the end of September.

=== Predictions ===
The following newspapers gave these predictions about how South Carolina would vote in the 1968 presidential election:

Source	Ranking	As of
The New York Times	Tilt I (flip)	September 8, 1968
Lebanon Daily News	Lean I (flip)	September 17, 1968
Daily Press	Lean I (flip)	October 11, 1968
The Charlotte News	Lean I (flip)	October 12, 1968
The Record	Tilt I (flip)	October 21, 1968
Shreveport Times	Lean I (flip)	November 3, 1968
The Selma Times-Journal	Lean I (flip)	November 3, 1968
The New York Times	Tossup	November 4, 1968

== Results ==
1968 United States presidential election in South Carolina
Party	Candidate	Votes	Percentage	Electoral votes
Republican	Richard Nixon	254,062	38.09%	8
Independent	George Wallace	215,430	32.30%	0
Democratic	Hubert Humphrey	197,486	29.61%	0
Write-ins	Various candidates	4	0.00%	0
Totals		666,978	100.00%	8
Voter turnout				–

=== Results by county ===
County	Richard Nixon Republican		George Wallace American Independent		Hubert Humphrey Democratic		Margin		Total votes cast
County	#	%	#	%	#	%	#	%	Total votes cast
Abbeville	1,213	20.77%	3,201	54.82%	1,425	24.40%	-1,776 (Note: In this county where Nixon ran third behind both Humphrey and Wallace, margin given is Wallace vote minus Humphrey vote and percentage margin Wallace percentage minus Humphrey percentage.)	-30.42%	5,839
Aiken	12,264	44.76%	8,815	32.17%	6,319	23.06%	3,449	12.59%	27,398
Allendale	997	29.72%	820	24.44%	1,538	45.84%	-541 (Note: In this county where Wallace ran third behind both Nixon and Humphrey, margin given is Humphrey vote minus Nixon vote and percentage margin Humphrey percentage minus Nixon percentage.)	-16.12%	3,355
Anderson	5,661	24.33%	12,384	53.23%	5,218	22.43%	-6,723	-28.90%	23,263
Bamberg	1,327	27.70%	1,618	33.78%	1,845	38.52%	227	4.74%	4,790
Barnwell	1,849	31.25%	2,351	39.74%	1,716	29.01%	-502	-8.49%	5,916
Beaufort	2,983	36.29%	1,498	18.22%	3,740	45.49%	-757	-9.20%	8,221
Berkeley	4,021	28.89%	4,808	34.55%	5,089	36.56%	281	2.01%	13,918
Calhoun	885	28.74%	978	31.76%	1,216	39.49%	238	7.73%	3,079
Charleston	24,282	43.45%	13,255	23.72%	18,343	32.83%	5,939	10.62%	55,880
Cherokee	2,853	27.19%	5,642	53.77%	1,998	19.04%	-2,789	-26.58%	10,493
Chester	2,862	33.71%	2,762	32.54%	2,865	33.75%	-3	-0.04%	8,489
Chesterfield	2,564	25.47%	4,324	42.95%	3,180	31.59%	-1,144	-11.36%	10,068
Clarendon	2,201	27.85%	2,097	26.53%	3,606	45.62%	-1,405	-17.77%	7,904
Colleton	2,824	34.67%	2,670	32.78%	2,651	32.55%	154	1.89%	8,145
Darlington	4,947	35.38%	5,231	37.42%	3,803	27.20%	-284	-2.04%	13,981
Dillon	2,396	35.73%	2,132	31.79%	2,178	32.48%	218	3.25%	6,706
Dorchester	3,354	31.21%	3,539	32.93%	3,855	35.87%	316	2.94%	10,748
Edgefield	1,688	43.07%	1,006	25.67%	1,225	31.26%	463	11.81%	3,919
Fairfield	1,619	27.14%	1,336	22.39%	3,011	50.47%	-1,392	-23.33%	5,966
Florence	8,917	36.19%	7,642	31.02%	8,079	32.79%	838	3.40%	24,638
Georgetown	3,269	32.62%	2,642	26.36%	4,110	41.01%	-841	-8.39%	10,021
Greenville	31,652	52.91%	15,241	25.48%	12,928	21.61%	16,411	27.43%	59,821
Greenwood	4,891	33.37%	6,024	41.10%	3,741	25.52%	-1,133	-7.73%	14,658 (Note: Two write-in votes were recorded from this county.)
Hampton	1,671	31.95%	1,452	27.76%	2,107	40.29%	-436	-8.34%	5,230
Horry	3,924	26.97%	6,701	46.06%	3,924	26.97%	-2,777	-19.09%	14,549
Jasper	633	20.31%	1,081	34.69%	1,402	44.99%	321	10.30%	3,116
Kershaw	4,079	38.56%	3,960	37.44%	2,539	24.00%	119	1.12%	10,578
Lancaster	4,874	37.75%	4,886	37.84%	3,151	24.41%	-12	-0.09%	12,911
Laurens	4,813	39.75%	4,279	35.34%	3,016	24.91%	534	4.41%	12,108
Lee	1,219	22.23%	2,113	38.54%	2,151	39.23%	38	0.69%	5,483
Lexington	12,204	48.49%	8,907	35.39%	4,058	16.12%	3,297	13.10%	25,169
Marion	2,512	36.85%	1,484	21.77%	2,821	41.38%	-309	-4.53%	6,817
Marlboro	2,024	31.34%	2,140	33.14%	2,294	35.52%	154	2.38%	6,458
McCormick	466	21.08%	757	34.24%	988	44.69%	231	10.45%	2,211
Newberry	4,538	42.35%	3,734	34.85%	2,444	22.81%	804	7.50%	10,716
Oconee	2,618	27.94%	4,742	50.61%	2,009	21.44%	-2,124	-22.67%	9,369
Orangeburg	5,144	24.20%	7,144	33.60%	8,971	42.20%	1,827	8.60%	21,259
Pickens	6,873	51.63%	4,424	33.23%	2,016	15.14%	2,449	18.40%	13,313
Richland	26,215	50.96%	7,030	13.67%	18,198	35.37%	8,017	15.59%	51,445
Saluda	1,466	30.53%	2,136	44.48%	1,200	24.99%	-670	-13.95%	4,802
Spartanburg	18,183	38.69%	17,346	36.91%	11,467	24.40%	837	1.78%	46,996
Sumter	5,451	33.43%	4,754	29.15%	6,103	37.42%	-652	-3.99%	16,308
Union	3,011	30.50%	4,590	46.50%	2,271	23.00%	-1,579	-16.00%	9,872
Williamsburg	3,029	28.08%	2,652	24.59%	5,106	47.33%	-2,077	-19.25%	10,787
York	7,596	37.48%	7,102	35.04%	5,571	27.49%	494	2.44%	20,269
Totals	254,062	38.09%	215,430	32.30%	197,486	29.61%	38,632	5.79%	666,982

=== Results by congressional district ===
Nixon won three out of six congressional districts, Wallace won two, and Humphrey won one. Wallace and Nixon both won two districts held by Democrats.

District	Nixon	Humphrey	Wallace
1st	36.9%	36.3%	26.8%
2nd	42.7%	32.2%	25.1%
3rd	26.1%	23%	40.9%
4th	46%	31%	23%
5th	33.3%	29.2%	37.5%
6th	32.4%	34.7%	32.9%

== Works cited ==
- Black, Earl; Black, Merle (1992). The Vital South: How Presidents Are Elected. Harvard University Press. ISBN 0674941306.
