= 1984 United States presidential election in South Carolina =

- November 6, 1984

Nominee	Ronald Reagan	Walter Mondale
Party	Republican	Democratic
Home state	California	Minnesota
Running mate	George H. W. Bush	Geraldine Ferraro
Electoral vote	8	0
Popular vote	615,539	344,470
Percentage	63.55%	35.57%
County results
Reagan
40–50%
50–60%
60–70%
70–80%
80–90%
Mondale
40–50%
50–60%
President before election
Ronald Reagan
Republican
Elected President
Ronald Reagan
Republican

The 1984 United States presidential election in South Carolina took place on November 6, 1984. All fifty states and DC, were part of the 1984 United States presidential election. South Carolina voters chose 8 electors to the Electoral College, which selected the president and vice president of the United States.

South Carolina was won by incumbent United States President Ronald Reagan of California, who was running against former Vice President Walter Mondale of Minnesota. Reagan ran for a second time with incumbent Vice President and former C.I.A. Director George H. W. Bush of Texas, and Mondale ran with Representative Geraldine Ferraro of New York, the first major female candidate for the vice presidency. As of the 2024 presidential election, this is the last time that Bamberg County voted for a Republican candidate.

== Campaign ==
Among white voters, 82% supported Reagan while 17% supported Mondale.

== Results ==
1984 United States presidential election in South Carolina
Party	Candidate	Votes	Percentage	Electoral votes
Republican	Ronald Reagan (incumbent)	615,539	63.55%	8
Democratic	Walter Mondale	344,470	35.57%	0
Libertarian	David Bergland	4,360	0.45%	0
American Party	Delmar Dennis	3,490	0.36%	0
United Citizens Party	Dennis Serrette	681	0.07%	0
Totals		968,540	100.0%	8

=== Results by county ===
County	Ronald Reagan Republican		Walter Mondale Democratic		David Bergland Libertarian		Delmar Dennis American		Dennis Serrette United Citizens		Margin		Total votes cast
County	#	%	#	%	#	%	#	%	#	%	#	%	Total votes cast
Abbeville	3,798	55.24%	3,051	44.38%	18	0.26%	7	0.10%	1	0.01%	747	10.86%	6,875
Aiken	25,872	71.60%	9,892	27.38%	320	0.89%	31	0.09%	18	0.05%	15,980	44.22%	36,133
Allendale	1,570	41.66%	2,170	57.57%	20	0.53%	7	0.19%	2	0.05%	-600	-15.91%	3,769
Anderson	24,123	69.54%	10,324	29.76%	139	0.40%	92	0.27%	13	0.04%	13,799	39.78%	34,691
Bamberg	2,908	49.87%	2,892	49.60%	17	0.29%	6	0.10%	8	0.14%	16	0.27%	5,831
Barnwell	4,346	60.45%	2,811	39.10%	21	0.29%	6	0.08%	5	0.07%	1,535	21.35%	7,189
Beaufort	13,668	64.72%	7,347	34.79%	71	0.34%	17	0.08%	15	0.07%	6,321	29.93%	21,118
Berkeley	16,972	69.24%	7,380	30.11%	76	0.31%	65	0.27%	18	0.07%	9,592	39.13%	24,511
Calhoun	2,742	53.83%	2,315	45.45%	17	0.33%	9	0.18%	11	0.22%	427	8.38%	5,094
Charleston	53,779	63.83%	29,481	34.99%	323	0.38%	477	0.57%	200	0.24%	24,298	28.84%	84,260
Cherokee	8,655	67.57%	4,101	32.02%	36	0.28%	10	0.08%	7	0.05%	4,554	35.55%	12,809
Chester	4,441	55.20%	3,559	44.24%	27	0.34%	12	0.15%	6	0.07%	882	10.96%	8,045
Chesterfield	5,451	54.15%	4,593	45.62%	18	0.18%	3	0.03%	2	0.02%	858	8.53%	10,067
Clarendon	5,102	47.48%	5,591	52.03%	31	0.29%	20	0.19%	2	0.02%	-489	-4.55%	10,746
Colleton	6,200	55.63%	4,910	44.06%	21	0.19%	8	0.07%	6	0.05%	1,290	11.57%	11,145
Darlington	11,100	58.70%	7,456	39.43%	194	1.03%	131	0.69%	29	0.15%	3,644	19.27%	18,910
Dillon	4,646	57.71%	3,360	41.74%	24	0.30%	14	0.17%	6	0.07%	1,286	15.97%	8,050
Dorchester	15,289	68.26%	7,037	31.42%	55	0.25%	11	0.05%	7	0.03%	8,252	36.84%	22,399
Edgefield	3,224	49.77%	3,227	49.81%	13	0.20%	11	0.17%	3	0.05%	-3	-0.04%	6,478
Fairfield	3,147	43.19%	4,117	56.50%	14	0.19%	6	0.08%	3	0.04%	-970	-13.31%	7,287
Florence	22,753	60.51%	14,639	38.93%	124	0.33%	61	0.16%	23	0.06%	8,114	21.58%	37,600
Georgetown	7,370	53.29%	6,392	46.22%	40	0.29%	21	0.15%	7	0.05%	978	7.07%	13,830
Greenville	66,766	73.07%	24,137	26.42%	337	0.37%	99	0.11%	30	0.03%	42,629	46.65%	91,369
Greenwood	10,887	62.91%	6,339	36.63%	63	0.36%	14	0.08%	4	0.02%	4,548	26.28%	17,307
Hampton	3,464	47.92%	3,736	51.69%	16	0.22%	11	0.15%	1	0.01%	-272	-3.77%	7,228
Horry	20,396	69.23%	8,940	30.34%	85	0.29%	33	0.11%	9	0.03%	11,456	38.89%	29,463
Jasper	3,102	45.09%	3,753	54.56%	11	0.16%	10	0.15%	3	0.04%	-651	-9.47%	6,879
Kershaw	8,822	66.70%	4,323	32.69%	60	0.45%	17	0.13%	4	0.03%	4,499	34.01%	13,226
Lancaster	10,383	63.92%	5,804	35.73%	37	0.23%	16	0.10%	4	0.02%	4,579	28.19%	16,244
Laurens	9,729	64.49%	5,312	35.21%	25	0.17%	15	0.10%	5	0.03%	4,417	29.28%	15,086
Lee	3,548	47.31%	3,912	52.16%	23	0.31%	15	0.20%	2	0.03%	-364	-4.85%	7,500
Lexington	38,628	80.95%	8,828	18.50%	225	0.47%	28	0.06%	12	0.03%	29,800	62.45%	47,721
McCormick	1,186	43.51%	1,526	55.98%	19	0.19%	13	0.13%	0	0.00%	-340	-12.47%	2,726
Marion	4,698	48.07%	5,043	51.60%	19	0.23%	15	0.18%	4	0.05%	-345	-3.53%	9,773
Marlboro	3,951	47.70%	4,294	51.84%	6	0.22%	4	0.15%	4	0.15%	-343	-4.14%	8,283
Newberry	7,176	65.19%	3,790	34.43%	29	0.26%	8	0.07%	5	0.05%	3,386	30.76%	11,008
Oconee	8,625	71.61%	3,333	27.67%	70	0.58%	11	0.09%	5	0.04%	5,292	43.94%	12,044
Orangeburg	14,286	48.20%	15,121	51.02%	55	0.19%	156	0.53%	18	0.06%	-835	-2.82%	29,636
Pickens	15,155	76.68%	4,481	22.67%	100	0.51%	20	0.10%	8	0.04%	10,674	54.01%	19,764
Richland	46,773	57.44%	32,212	39.56%	766	0.94%	1,591	1.95%	87	0.11%	14,561	17.88%	81,429
Saluda	3,515	63.90%	1,962	35.67%	18	0.33%	2	0.04%	4	0.07%	1,553	28.23%	5,501
Spartanburg	41,553	66.41%	20,130	32.17%	555	0.89%	285	0.46%	52	0.08%	21,423	34.24%	62,575
Sumter	12,909	57.14%	9,566	42.35%	61	0.27%	38	0.17%	16	0.07%	3,343	14.79%	22,590
Union	6,331	58.64%	4,424	40.98%	34	0.31%	4	0.04%	3	0.03%	1,907	17.66%	10,796
Williamsburg	6,492	45.95%	7,586	53.69%	29	0.21%	15	0.11%	6	0.04%	-1,094	-7.74%	14,128
York	20,008	67.99%	9,273	31.51%	98	0.33%	45	0.15%	3	0.01%	10,735	36.48%	29,427
Totals	615,539	63.55%	344,470	35.57%	4,360	0.45%	3,490	0.36%	681	0.07%	271,069	27.98%	968,540

==== Counties that flipped from Democratic to Republican ====
- Abbeville
- Anderson
- Bamberg
- Barnwell
- Calhoun
- Cherokee
- Chester
- Chesterfield
- Colleton
- Darlington
- Dillon
- Georgetown
- Greenwood
- Lancaster
- Laurens
- Oconee
- Saluda
- Union
- York

== See also ==
- Presidency of Ronald Reagan

== Works cited ==
- Black, Earl; Black, Merle (1992). The Vital South: How Presidents Are Elected. Harvard University Press. ISBN 0674941306.
