= 1876 United States presidential election in South Carolina =

- November 7, 1876
- Turnout: 101.3%
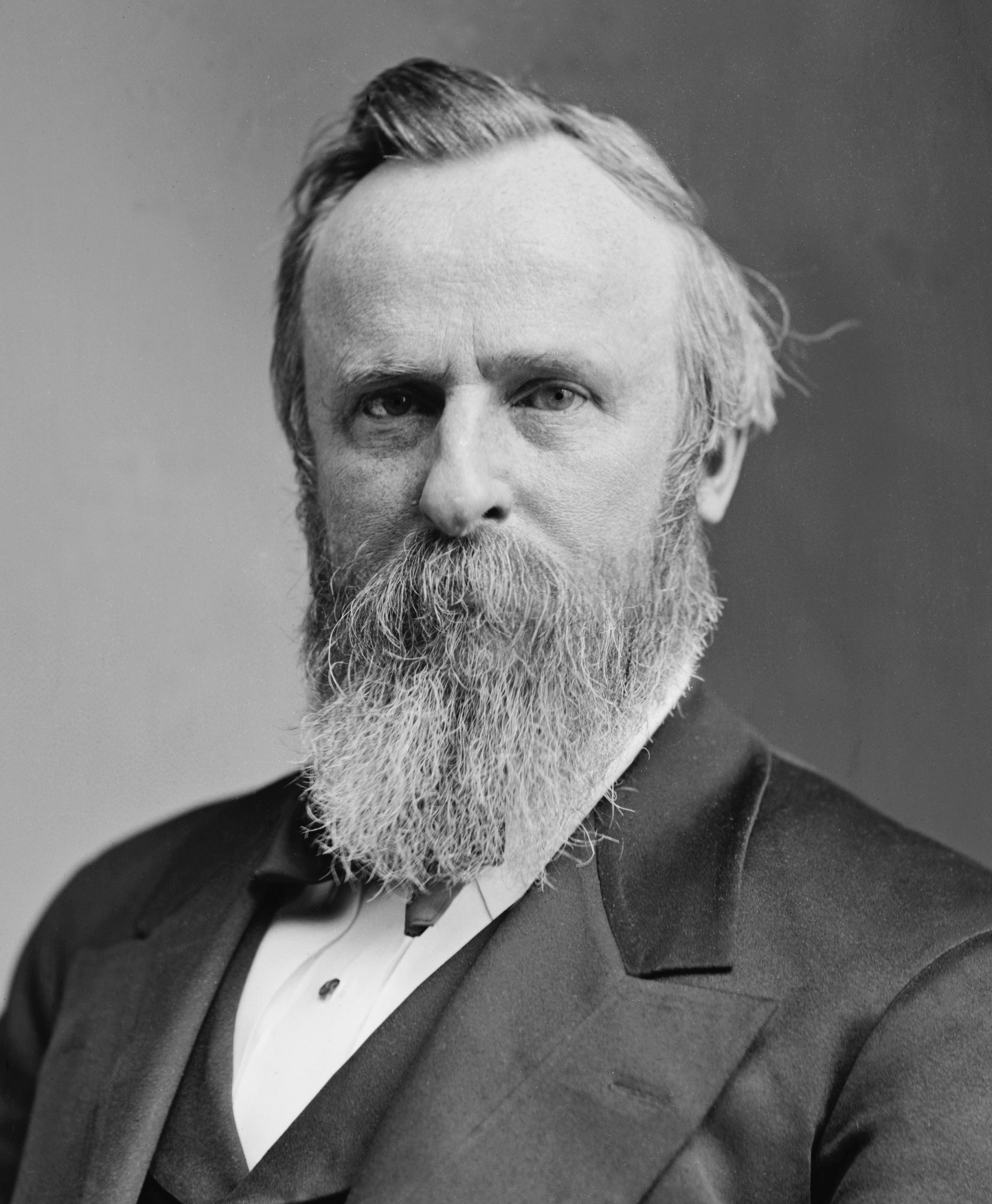

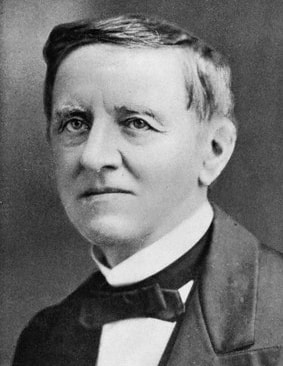
Nominee	Rutherford B. Hayes	Samuel J. Tilden
Party	Republican	Democratic
Home state	Ohio	New York
Running mate	William A. Wheeler	Thomas A. Hendricks
Electoral vote	7	0
Popular vote	91,870	90,906
Percentage	50.26%	49.74%
County results
Hayes
50–60%
60–70%
70–80%
Tilden
50–60%
60–70%
70–80%
80–90%
President before election
Ulysses S. Grant
Republican
Elected President
Rutherford B. Hayes
Republican

The 1876 United States presidential election in South Carolina took place on November 7, 1876, as part of the 1876 United States presidential election. Voters chose 7 representatives, or electors to the Electoral College, who voted for president and vice president.

South Carolina voted for the Republican nominee, Rutherford B. Hayes, over the Democratic nominee, Samuel J. Tilden. Hayes won the state by a very narrow margin of 0.53%, only 964 votes. Events such as the Hamburg massacre served to dissuade many Republican voters. This would be the last time a Republican presidential candidate would win South Carolina until Barry Goldwater carried the state in 1964.

The results here, along with Florida and Louisiana, were strongly disputed due to the suppression of African-American voters in the state. The results in this state were possibly determined through the Compromise of 1877, which allegedly awarded Hayes South Carolina and the election. Had Tilden won South Carolina, he would have won the election.

Due to Jim Crow laws disenfranchising many Black voters as well as some poor white voters, the total vote count of 182,776 votes cast in this election would not be surpassed until 1952, 76 years later, after the poll tax had been repealed. In fact, between 1884 and 1928, the total vote did not even pass 100,000.

The election in South Carolina was the oddest of the ones in Louisiana, Florida, and the other disputed state Oregon because the results showed over 101% of all registered voters turned out to vote for President.

== Results ==
General Election Results
Party	Pledged to	Elector	Votes
Republican Party	Rutherford B. Hayes	John Winsmith	91,870
Republican Party	Rutherford B. Hayes	T. B. Johnston	91,852
Republican Party	Rutherford B. Hayes	W. F. Myers	91,830
Republican Party	Rutherford B. Hayes	W. B. Nash	91,804
Republican Party	Rutherford B. Hayes	C. C. Bowen	91,786
Republican Party	Rutherford B. Hayes	Wilson Cook	91,432
Republican Party	Rutherford B. Hayes	Timothy Hurley	91,136
Democratic Party	Samuel J. Tilden	John B. Erwin	90,906
Democratic Party	Samuel J. Tilden	William Wallace	90,905
Democratic Party	Samuel J. Tilden	T. G. Barker	90,896
Democratic Party	Samuel J. Tilden	J. W. Harrington	90,895
Democratic Party	Samuel J. Tilden	Robert Aldrich	90,860
Democratic Party	Samuel J. Tilden	John I. Ingram	90,768
Democratic Party	Samuel J. Tilden	Samuel McGowan	90,737
Votes cast (Note: Based on totals for highest elector on each ticket)			182,776

=== Results by county ===
County	Rutherford B. Hayes Republican		Samuel J. Tilden Democratic		Margin		Total votes cast
County	#	%	#	%	#	%	Total votes cast
Abbeville	3,718	49.43%	3,803	50.57%	-85	-1.13%	7,521
Aiken	2,218	43.31%	2,903	56.69%	-685	-13.38%	5,121
Anderson	1,209	23.20%	4,003	76.80%	-2,794	-53.61%	5,212
Barnwell	2,835	42.13%	3,894	57.87%	-1,059	-15.74%	6,729
Beaufort	7,570	77.08%	2,251	22.92%	5,319	54.16%	9,821
Charleston	15,103	63.24%	8,780	36.76%	6,323	26.47%	23,883
Chester	2,440	55.29%	1,973	44.71%	467	10.58%	4,413
Chesterfield	988	37.80%	1,626	62.20%	-638	-24.41%	2,614
Clarendon	1,896	57.11%	1,424	42.89%	472	14.22%	3,320
Colleton	4,233	59.16%	2,922	40.84%	1,311	18.32%	7,155
Darlington	3,521	56.26%	2,737	43.74%	784	12.53%	6,258
Edgefield	3,124	33.30%	6,257	66.70%	-3,133	-33.40%	9,381
Fairfield	2,930	59.00%	2,036	41.00%	894	18.00%	4,966
Georgetown	2,791	72.53%	1,057	27.47%	1,734	45.06%	3,848
Greenville	1,775	30.05%	4,132	69.95%	-2,357	-39.90%	5,907
Horry	597	23.59%	1,934	76.41%	-1,337	-52.82%	2,531
Kershaw	2,070	54.16%	1,752	45.84%	318	8.32%	3,822
Lancaster	1,259	45.32%	1,519	54.68%	-260	-9.36%	2,778
Laurens	1,814	38.42%	2,908	61.58%	-1,094	-23.17%	4,722
Lexington	1,295	38.19%	2,096	61.81%	-801	-23.62%	3,391
Marion	2,502	44.30%	3,146	55.70%	-644	-11.40%	5,648
Marlboro	1,617	45.43%	1,942	54.57%	-325	-9.13%	3,559
Newberry	2,844	57.29%	2,120	42.71%	724	14.59%	4,964
Oconee	537	20.38%	2,098	79.62%	-1,561	-59.24%	2,635
Orangeburg	4,486	61.28%	2,835	38.72%	1,651	22.55%	7,321
Pickens	423	17.49%	1,995	82.51%	-1,572	-65.01%	2,418
Richland	3,904	62.08%	2,385	37.92%	1,519	24.15%	6,289
Spartanburg	1,545	25.14%	4,601	74.86%	-3,056	-49.72%	6,146
Sumter	3,896	62.38%	2,350	37.62%	1,546	24.75%	6,246
Union	1,809	42.37%	2,461	57.63%	-652	-15.27%	4,270
Williamsburg	2,455	58.40%	1,749	41.60%	706	16.79%	4,204
York	2,466	43.39%	3,217	56.61%	-751	-13.21%	5,683
Totals	91,870	50.26%	90,906	49.74%	964	0.53%	182,776

== See also ==
- United States presidential elections in South Carolina
