= 1892 United States presidential election in South Carolina =

- November 8, 1892

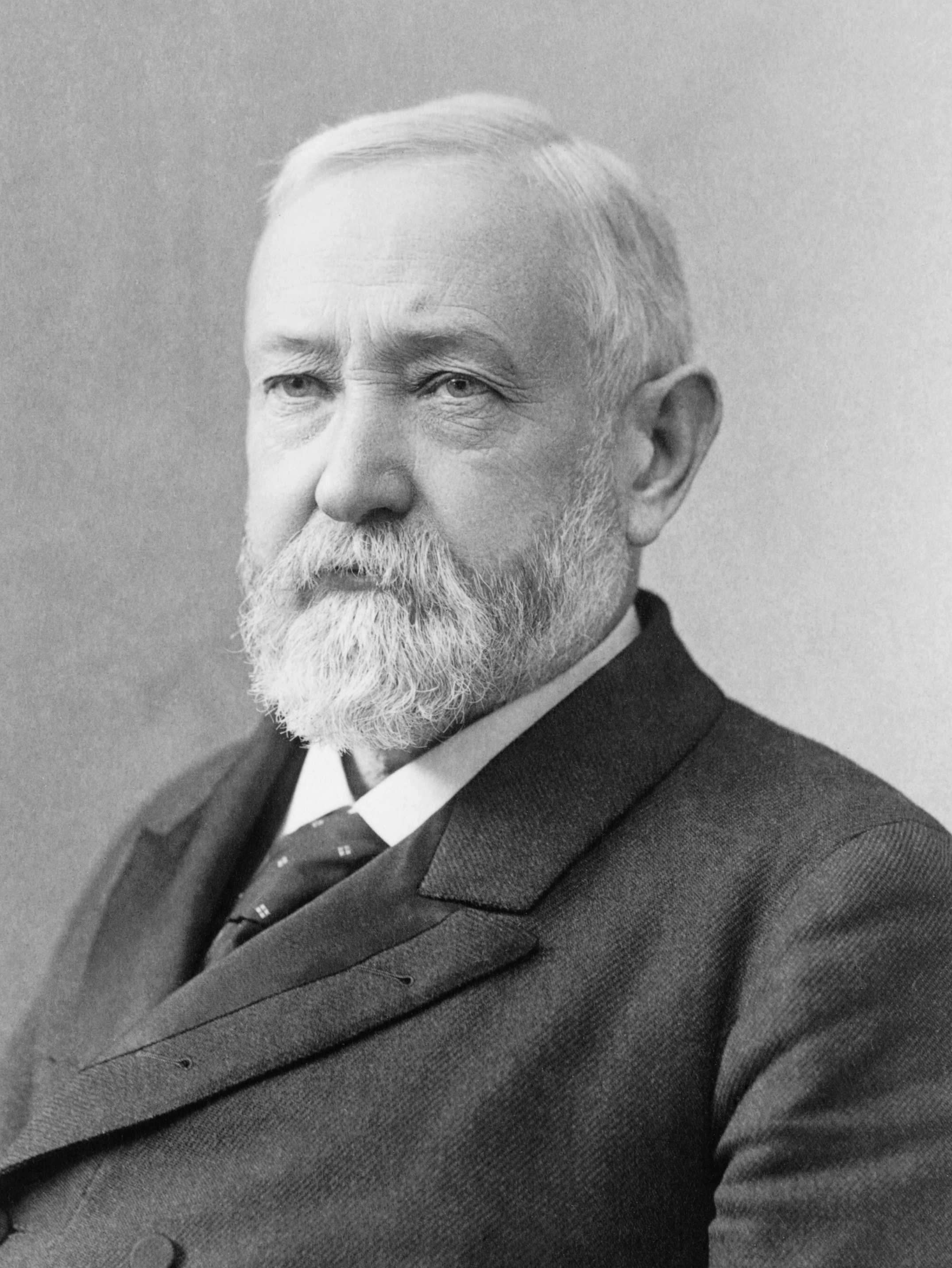
Nominee	Grover Cleveland	Benjamin Harrison
Party	Democratic	Republican
Home state	New York	Indiana
Running mate	Adlai Stevenson I	Whitelaw Reid
Electoral vote	9	0
Popular vote	54,698	13,384
Percentage	77.59%	18.99%
County results
Cleveland
50–60%
60–70%
70–80%
80–90%
90–100%
Harrison
50–60%
60–70%
President before election
Benjamin Harrison
Republican
Elected President
Grover Cleveland
Democratic

The 1892 United States presidential election in South Carolina took place on November 8, 1892, as part of the 1892 United States presidential election. Voters chose nine representatives, or electors to the Electoral College, who voted for president and vice president.

South Carolina voted for the Democratic nominee, former President Grover Cleveland, who was running for a second, non-consecutive term, over Republican nominee, incumbent President Benjamin Harrison. Cleveland won the state by a landslide margin of 58.60%.

The three counties that voted Republican were all majority black. This was the last election before the disfranchising 1895 state constitutional convention.

== Results ==
General Election Results
Party	Pledged to	Elector	Votes
Democratic Party	Grover Cleveland	C. C. Tracy	54,698
Democratic Party	Grover Cleveland	Isaac H. McCalla	54,698
Democratic Party	Grover Cleveland	T. S. Williams	54,698
Democratic Party	Grover Cleveland	Lewis P. Walker	54,698
Democratic Party	Grover Cleveland	J. Steele Brice	54,698
Democratic Party	Grover Cleveland	Lawrence W. Nettles	54,698
Democratic Party	Grover Cleveland	Joseph H. Hart	54,698
Democratic Party	Grover Cleveland	J. William Stokes	54,692
Democratic Party	Grover Cleveland	Ernest Gary	54,680
Republican Party	Benjamin Harrison	Bruce H. Williams	13,384
Republican Party	Benjamin Harrison	James Powell	13,384
Republican Party	Benjamin Harrison	Joseph W. Morris	13,384
Republican Party	Benjamin Harrison	Lawson D. Melton	13,384
Republican Party	Benjamin Harrison	William E. Boykin	13,384
Republican Party	Benjamin Harrison	Matthew M. Monzon	13,384
Republican Party	Benjamin Harrison	Joseph W. Collins	13,384
Republican Party	Benjamin Harrison	John R. Talbert	13,345
Republican Party	Benjamin Harrison	William D. Crum	13,335
People's Party	James B. Weaver	William H. Duncan	2,410
People's Party	James B. Weaver	White A. Hamilton	2,410
People's Party	James B. Weaver	Robert B. Ligon	2,410
People's Party	James B. Weaver	William W. McElwee	2,410
People's Party	James B. Weaver	Julius J. Lane	2,410
People's Party	James B. Weaver	Burkett H. Taylor	2,410
People's Party	James B. Weaver	Joseph L. Keitt	2,407
People's Party	James B. Weaver	J. Waddell Bowden	2,407
People's Party	James B. Weaver	Philip R. Rawl	2,407
Votes cast (Note: Based on totals for highest elector on each ticket)			70,492

=== Results by county ===
County	Stephen Grover Cleveland Democratic		Benjamin Harrison Republican		James Baird Weaver People's		Margin		Total votes cast
County	#	%	#	%	#	%	#	%	Total votes cast
Abbeville	2,359	94.44%	138	5.52%	1	0.04%	2,221	88.91%	2,498
Aiken	1,802	79.45%	396	17.46%	70	3.09%	1,406	61.99%	2,268
Anderson	2,248	86.96%	193	7.47%	144	5.57%	2,055	79.50%	2,585
Barnwell	2,137	78.39%	549	20.14%	40	1.47%	1,588	58.25%	2,726
Beaufort	175	39.50%	268	60.50%	0	0.00%	-93	-20.99%	443
Berkeley	1,037	46.32%	1,171	52.30%	31	1.38%	-134	-5.98%	2,239
Charleston	1,564	78.40%	430	21.55%	1	0.05%	1,134	56.84%	1,995
Chester	1,508	79.45%	383	20.18%	7	0.37%	1,125	59.27%	1,898
Chesterfield	1,494	78.63%	382	20.11%	24	1.26%	1,112	58.53%	1,900
Clarendon	2,192	85.76%	364	14.24%	0	0.00%	1,828	71.52%	2,556
Colleton	1,312	73.54%	472	26.46%	0	0.00%	840	47.09%	1,784
Darlington	1,810	93.49%	102	5.27%	24	1.24%	1,708	88.22%	1,936
Edgefield	2,679	95.51%	26	0.93%	100	3.57%	2,579 (Note: In this county where Weaver ran second ahead of Harrison, margin given is Cleveland vote minus Weaver vote and percentage margin Cleveland percentage minus Weaver percentage.)	91.94%	2,805
Fairfield	1,041	80.76%	243	18.85%	5	0.39%	798	61.91%	1,289
Florence	1,609	84.60%	293	15.40%	0	0.00%	1,316	69.19%	1,902
Georgetown	552	38.31%	888	61.62%	1	0.07%	-336	-23.32%	1,441
Greenville	3,026	82.09%	600	16.28%	60	1.63%	2,426	65.82%	3,686
Hampton	1,097	81.20%	254	18.80%	0	0.00%	843	62.40%	1,351
Kershaw	1,107	75.15%	358	24.30%	8	0.54%	749	50.85%	1,473
Lancaster	1,744	69.98%	624	25.04%	124	4.98%	1,120	44.94%	2,492
Laurens	1,772	90.64%	173	8.85%	10	0.51%	1,599	81.79%	1,955
Lexington	1,287	80.39%	71	4.43%	243	15.18%	1,044	65.21%	1,601
Marion	1,737	73.57%	466	19.74%	158	6.69%	1,271	53.83%	2,361
Marlboro	1,004	69.87%	262	18.23%	171	11.90%	742	51.64%	1,437
Newberry	1,534	81.21%	293	15.51%	62	3.28%	1,241	65.70%	1,889
Oconee	909	58.38%	220	14.13%	428	27.49%	481	30.89%	1,557
Orangeburg	2,792	76.77%	838	23.04%	7	0.19%	1,954	53.73%	3,637
Pickens	603	50.42%	129	10.79%	464	38.80%	139	11.62%	1,196
Richland	788	84.37%	146	15.63%	0	0.00%	642	68.74%	934
Spartanburg	3,515	83.79%	551	13.13%	129	3.08%	2,964	70.66%	4,195
Sumter	1,535	70.35%	639	29.29%	8	0.37%	896	41.06%	2,182
Union	1,339	76.47%	356	20.33%	56	3.20%	983	56.14%	1,751
Williamsburg	1,178	59.02%	787	39.43%	31	1.55%	391	19.59%	1,996
York	2,212	87.29%	319	12.59%	3	0.12%	1,893	74.70%	2,534
Horry (Note: No returns from Horry County.)	N/A	N/A	N/A	N/A	N/A	N/A	N/A	N/A	N/A
Totals	54,698	77.59%	13,384	18.99%	2,410	3.42%	41,314	58.60%	70,492

== See also ==
- United States presidential elections in South Carolina

== Works cited ==
- Knoles, George (1971). The Presidential Campaign and Election of 1892. Stanford University Press. ISBN 040450969X.
