= 1952 United States presidential election in South Carolina =

- November 4, 1952

All 8 South Carolina votes to the Electoral College

Nominee	Adlai Stevenson	Dwight D. Eisenhower
Party	Democratic	Nominated by petition (Note: Eisenhower vote was the fusion of 158,289 votes for "Nominated by Petition" electors and 9,793 for "Republican" electors)
Alliance		Republican
Home state	Illinois	New York
Running mate	John Sparkman	Richard Nixon
Electoral vote	8	0
Popular vote	173,004	168,082
Percentage	50.72%	49.28%
County results
Stevenson
50–60%
60–70%
70–80%
Eisenhower
50–60%
60–70%
70–80%
President before election
Harry S. Truman
Democratic
Elected President
Dwight D. Eisenhower
Republican

The 1952 United States presidential election in South Carolina took place on November 4, 1952, as part of the 1952 United States presidential election. South Carolina voters chose 8 representatives, or electors, to the Electoral College, who voted for president and vice president. Democrat Adlai Stevenson II defeated Dwight D. Eisenhower, the national Republican nominee, who ran in South Carolina as an independent candidate.

For six decades up to 1950, South Carolina had been a one-party state dominated by the Democratic Party. The Republican Party had been moribund due to the disfranchisement of blacks and the complete absence of other support bases as South Carolina completely lacked upland or German refugee whites opposed to secession. Between 1904 and 1948, no Republican presidential candidate ever obtained more than nine percent of the total presidential vote or even won a single county, a vote which in 1924 reached as low as 6.6 percent of the total voting-age population, and in 1936 where their total vote share was 1.4%.

This absolute loyalty began to break down during World War II when Vice-presidents Henry A. Wallace and Harry S. Truman began to realize that a legacy of discrimination against blacks was a threat to the United States' image abroad and its ability to win the Cold War against the radically egalitarian rhetoric of Communism. In the 1948 presidential election, Truman was backed by only 24 percent of South Carolina's limited electorate — most of that from the relatively few upcountry poor whites able to meet rigorous voting requirements — and state Governor Strom Thurmond won 72 percent, carrying every county except Anderson and Spartanburg.

== Results ==
1952 United States presidential election in South Carolina
Party	Candidate	Votes	%
Democratic	Adlai Stevenson	173,004	50.72%
Independent	Dwight D. Eisenhower	168,082	49.28%
Total votes		341,086	100%

=== Results by county ===
County	Adlai Stevenson Democratic		Dwight D. Eisenhower Nominated by petition		Margin		Total votes cast
County	#	%	#	%	#	%	Total votes cast
Abbeville	2,776	74.11%	970	25.89%	1,806	48.22%	3,746
Aiken	4,346	50.37%	4,282	49.63%	64	0.74%	8,628
Allendale	440	36.94%	751	63.06%	-311	-26.12%	1,191
Anderson	11,664	77.75%	3,338	22.25%	8,326	55.50%	15,002
Bamberg	750	34.77%	1,407	65.23%	-657	-30.46%	2,157
Barnwell	1,598	70.86%	657	29.14%	941	41.72%	2,255
Beaufort	1,106	40.89%	1,599	59.11%	-493	-18.22%	2,705
Berkeley	1,708	40.76%	2,482	59.24%	-774	-18.48%	4,190
Calhoun	384	25.75%	1,107	74.25%	-723	-48.50%	1,491
Charleston	9,959	33.15%	20,087	66.85%	-10,128	-33.70%	30,046
Cherokee	5,545	78.39%	1,529	21.61%	4,016	56.78%	7,074
Chester	2,843	50.59%	2,777	49.41%	66	1.18%	5,620
Chesterfield	4,668	72.44%	1,776	27.56%	2,892	44.88%	6,444
Clarendon	953	31.49%	2,073	68.51%	-1,120	-37.02%	3,026
Colleton	1,905	40.84%	2,760	59.16%	-855	-18.32%	4,665
Darlington	5,718	62.28%	3,463	37.72%	2,255	24.56%	9,181
Dillon	1,578	51.72%	1,473	48.28%	105	3.44%	3,051
Dorchester	852	26.87%	2,319	73.13%	-1,467	-46.26%	3,171
Edgefield	753	31.14%	1,665	68.86%	-912	-37.72%	2,418
Fairfield	1,590	49.73%	1,607	50.27%	-17	-0.54%	3,197
Florence	5,340	50.49%	5,236	49.51%	104	0.98%	10,576
Georgetown	1,370	36.93%	2,340	63.07%	-970	-26.14%	3,710
Greenville	14,863	45.58%	17,743	54.42%	-2,880	-8.84%	32,606
Greenwood	3,815	52.93%	3,392	47.07%	423	5.86%	7,207
Hampton	787	32.52%	1,633	67.48%	-846	-34.96%	2,420
Horry	4,489	54.71%	3,716	45.29%	773	9.42%	8,205
Jasper	636	44.29%	800	55.71%	-164	-11.42%	1,436
Kershaw	2,052	41.15%	2,935	58.85%	-883	-17.70%	4,987
Lancaster	4,989	61.83%	3,080	38.17%	1,909	23.66%	8,069
Laurens	3,697	52.09%	3,400	47.91%	297	4.18%	7,097
Lee	927	35.71%	1,669	64.29%	-742	-28.58%	2,596
Lexington	3,513	46.65%	4,018	53.35%	-505	-6.70%	7,531
Marion	1,610	41.04%	2,313	58.96%	-703	-17.92%	3,923
Marlboro	1,699	52.44%	1,541	47.56%	158	4.88%	3,240
McCormick	624	51.91%	577	48.00%	47	3.91%	1,202 (Note: One write-in vote was recorded from McCormick County)
Newberry	3,418	45.31%	4,126	54.69%	-708	-9.38%	7,544
Oconee	3,230	66.54%	1,624	33.46%	1,606	33.08%	4,854
Orangeburg	2,829	37.60%	4,695	62.40%	-1,866	-24.80%	7,524
Pickens	2,865	48.06%	3,096	51.94%	-231	-3.88%	5,961
Richland	8,890	35.83%	15,925	64.17%	-7,035	-28.34%	24,815
Saluda	1,592	53.28%	1,396	46.72%	196	6.56%	2,988
Spartanburg	21,883	68.58%	10,028	31.42%	11,855	37.16%	31,911
Sumter	2,014	29.88%	4,726	70.12%	-2,712	-40.24%	6,740
Union	5,921	73.87%	2,094	26.13%	3,827	47.74%	8,015
Williamsburg	1,320	33.88%	2,576	66.12%	-1,256	-32.24%	3,896
York	7,495	58.66%	5,281	41.34%	2,214	17.32%	12,776
Totals	173,004	50.72%	168,082	49.28%	4,922	1.44%	341,086

==== Counties that flipped from Dixiecrat to Democratic ====
- Florence
- Horry
- McCormick
- Marlboro
- Abbeville
- Barnwell
- Cherokee
- Chester
- Chesterfield
- Darlington
- Dillon
- Greenwood
- Lancaster
- Laurens
- Oconee
- Saluda
- Union
- York
- Aiken

==== Counties that flipped from Dixiecrat to Republican ====
- Allendale
- Bamberg
- Beaufort
- Berkeley
- Charleston
- Calhoun
- Clarendon
- Colleton
- Dorchester
- Edgefield
- Fairfield
- Greenville
- Georgetown
- Hampton
- Jasper
- Kershaw
- Lexington
- Lee
- Marion
- Newberry
- Orangeburg
- Pickens
- Richland
- Sumter
- Williamsburg

== Analysis ==
From the time Eisenhower announced he would run on an independent slate nominated by the many dissident Democrats, he gained substantial support, most especially in the small black-majority rural counties where only whites voted. However, polls always had Stevenson staying ahead of Eisenhower, and in the end he carried the state by a small majority of 5,000 votes. Stevenson's victory was largely due to his ability to maintain two- and three-to-one majorities in the poor white upcountry counties that had given substantial opposition to Thurmond, along with a substantial majority of the 20,000 or so blacks who are believed to have voted.

South Carolina was ultimately won by Stevenson and running mate Alabama Senator John Sparkman, with 50.72 percent of the popular vote, against Columbia University President Dwight D. Eisenhower (R–New York) and California Senator Richard Nixon, with 49.28 percent of the popular vote. This was the first time Republicans won any county in the state since 1900. As of the 2020 presidential election, this is the last election in which Aiken County voted for a Democratic presidential candidate.

=== Sweeping changes in electorate ===
Between the 1948 and 1952 presidential elections, South Carolina's electorate saw the most radical changes in any state since Reconstruction and "Redemption" had expanded and then contracted the electorates of all former Confederate states. The state became the last to fully adopt the secret ballot, whose absence had allowed intimidation of those who refused to vote Democratic in general elections, and it also fully abolished the poll tax that had further restricted white turnout in presidential elections. There was also some expansion of black voter registration, though as in all areas of the South east of the Mississippi River this was largely an urban phenomenon.

=== Continuing sentiment against national Democrats ===
Despite Truman announcing as early as May 1950 that he would not run again for president in 1952, it had already become clear that South Carolina's rulers remained severely disenchanted with the national Democratic Party. Originally it was planned that Eisenhower would run on an independent ticket with former state Governor James F. Byrnes, who regained his Senate seat in the 1950 primary, with the ultimate goal of the entire South controlling national politics as an unpledged electoral slate.

Despite some criticism of his policies, Byrnes created an organization named "Independents for Eisenhower" which was aimed at allowing white Southerners to leave the Democratic Party without embracing the still-feared "Party of Lincoln". These would join with a small number of remnant Republicans to form a fusion slate for Eisenhower — who by the time this plan was developed in September had already won the Republican nomination. In addition to Byrnes, Dixiecrat candidate Thurmond also endorsed Eisenhower, foreshadowing his switch to the Republican Party to support the much more conservative Barry Goldwater a dozen years later.

Further sentiment against the national Democratic Party resulted from fears that the Supreme Court would — as it did in the legendary Brown v. Board of Education case a year and a half after the election — rule South Carolina's de jure segregated school system a violation of the Fourteenth Amendment.

== See also ==
- United States presidential elections in South Carolina
