= 1872 United States presidential election in South Carolina =

- November 5, 1872
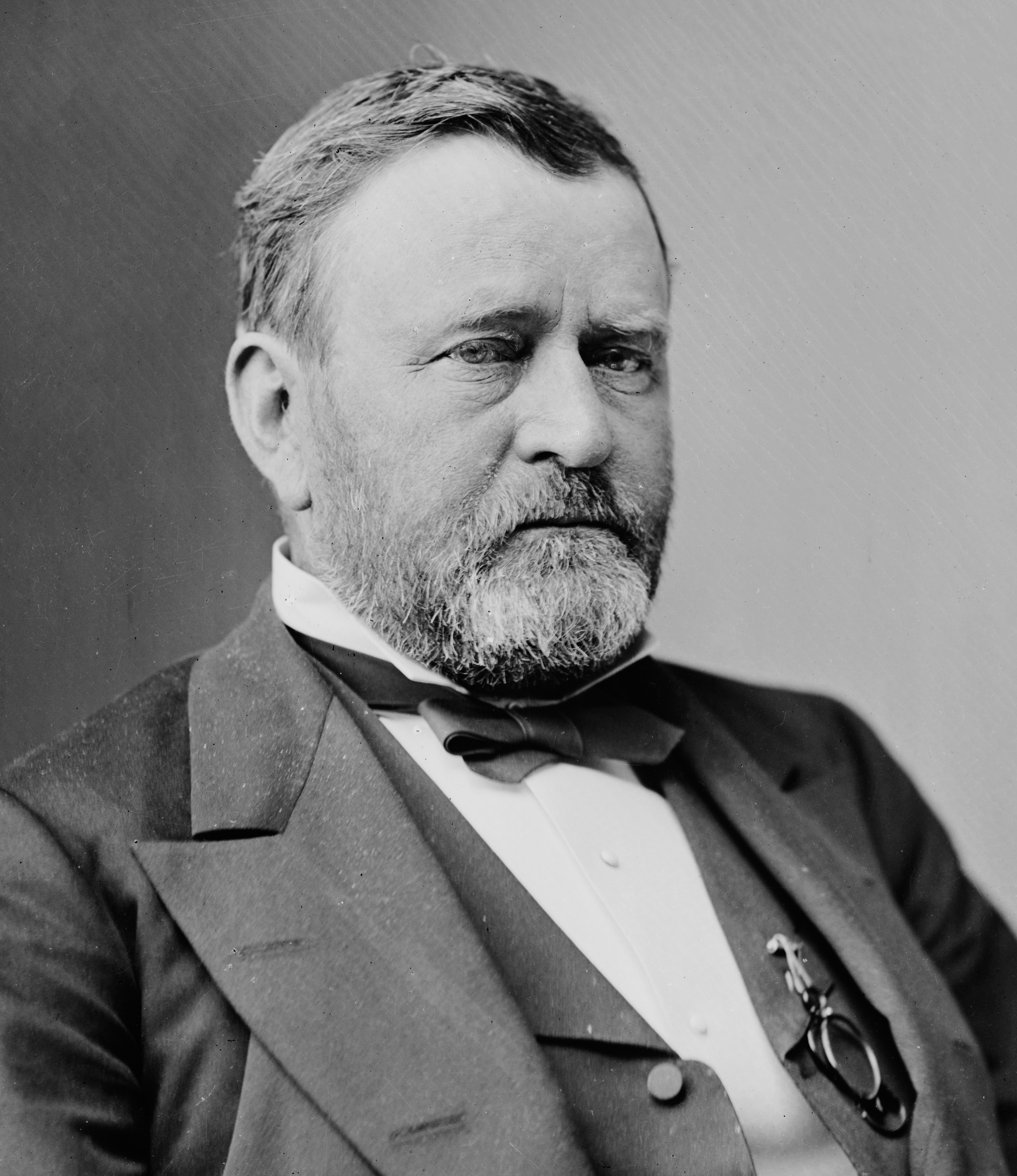

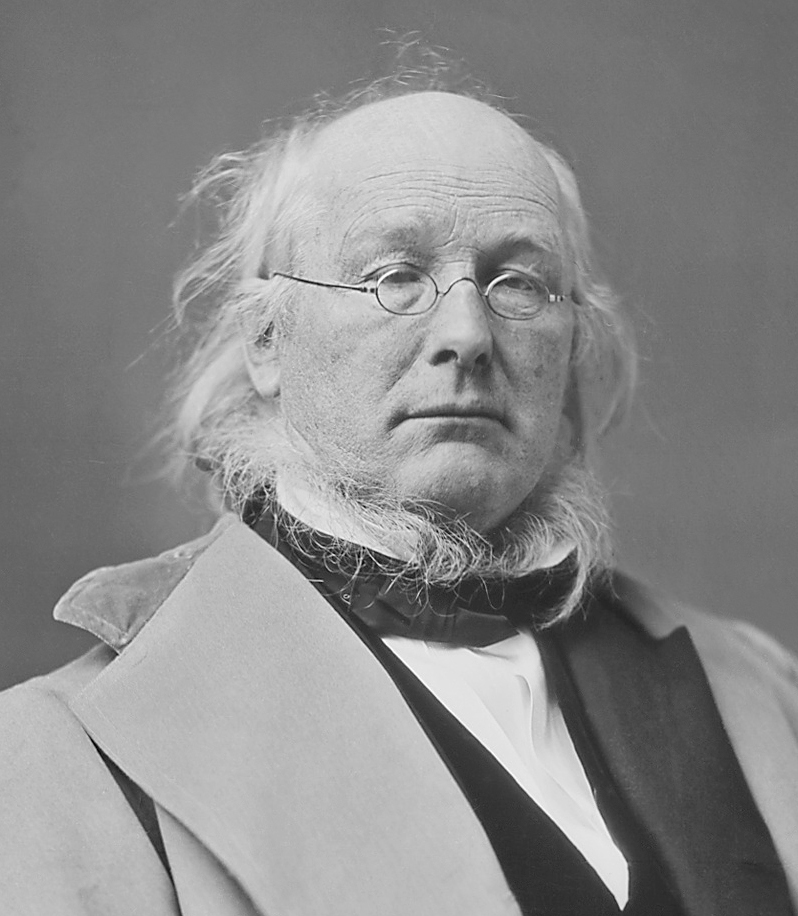
Nominee	Ulysses S. Grant	Horace Greeley
Party	Republican	Liberal Republican
Home state	Illinois	New York
Running mate	Henry Wilson	Benjamin G. Brown
Electoral vote	7	0
Popular vote	72,290	22,683
Percentage	75.75%	23.77%
County results
Grant
50–60%
60–70%
70–80%
80–90%
90–100%
Greeley
50–60%
President before election
Ulysses S. Grant
Republican
Elected President
Ulysses S. Grant
Republican

The 1872 United States presidential election in South Carolina took place on November 5, 1872. All contemporary 37 states were part of the 1872 United States presidential election. The state voters chose 7 electors to the Electoral College, which selected the president and vice president.

South Carolina was won by the Republican nominees, incumbent President Ulysses S. Grant of Illinois and his running mate Senator Henry Wilson of Massachusetts. Grant and Wilson defeated the Liberal Republican and Democratic nominees, former Congressman Horace Greeley of New York and his running mate former Senator and Governor Benjamin Gratz Brown of Missouri by a margin of 51.98%.

With 75.75% of the popular vote, South Carolina would be Grant's second strongest victory in terms of percentage in the popular vote after Vermont. This election would also prove to be the high water mark for any Republican presidential candidate in the state as of 2026.

== Results ==
General Election Results
Party	Pledged to	Elector	Votes
Republican Party	Ulysses S. Grant	D. H. Chamberlain	72,290
Republican Party	Ulysses S. Grant	S. A. Swails	72,289
Republican Party	Ulysses S. Grant	Henry Sparnick	72,287
Republican Party	Ulysses S. Grant	W. B. Nash	72,282
Republican Party	Ulysses S. Grant	William Gurney	72,260
Republican Party	Ulysses S. Grant	W. N. Taft	72,164
Republican Party	Ulysses S. Grant	T. J. Mackey	72,124
Democratic Party	Horace Greeley	S. A. Pearce	22,683
Democratic Party	Horace Greeley	M. P. O'Connor	22,669
Democratic Party	Horace Greeley	W. H. Wallace	22,663
Democratic Party	Horace Greeley	Johnson Hagood	22,648
Democratic Party	Horace Greeley	S. Farr	22,641
Democratic Party	Horace Greeley	W. W. Robertson	22,606
Democratic Party	Horace Greeley	W. W. Walker	22,472
Straight-Out Democratic Party	Charles O'Conor	W. H. Stack	204
Straight-Out Democratic Party	Charles O'Conor	J. D. McCarley	202
Straight-Out Democratic Party	Charles O'Conor	William T. Wilkins	202
Straight-Out Democratic Party	Charles O'Conor	T. D. Napper	201
Straight-Out Democratic Party	Charles O'Conor	J. W. Covar	201
Straight-Out Democratic Party	Charles O'Conor	J. R. Lambson	194
Straight-Out Democratic Party	Charles O'Conor	A. J. Vandergrift	185
Write-in	N/A	Scattering	259
Votes cast (Note: Based on totals for highest elector on each ticket)			95,436

== See also ==
- United States presidential elections in South Carolina
