= 1884 United States presidential election in South Carolina =

- November 4, 1884

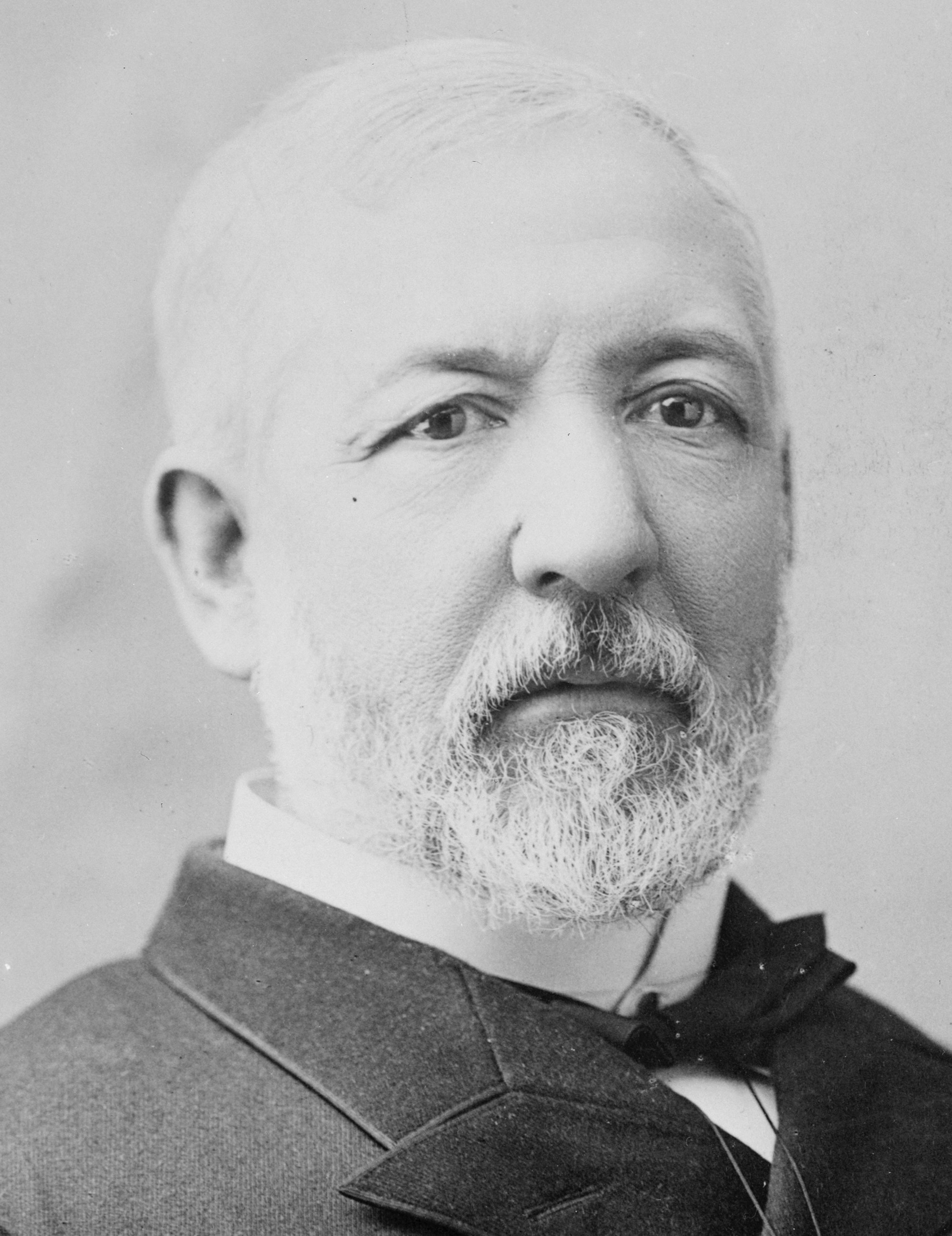
Nominee	Grover Cleveland	James G. Blaine
Party	Democratic	Republican
Home state	New York	Maine
Running mate	Thomas A. Hendricks	John A. Logan
Electoral vote	9	0
Popular vote	69,845	21,730
Percentage	75.25%	23.41%
County results
Cleveland
50–60%
60–70%
70–80%
80–90%
90–100%
Blaine
60–70%
70–80%
90–100%
President before election
Chester A. Arthur
Republican
Elected President
Grover Cleveland
Democratic

The 1884 United States presidential election in South Carolina took place on November 4, 1884, as part of the 1884 United States presidential election. Voters chose 9 representatives, or electors to the Electoral College, who voted for president and vice president.

South Carolina voted for the Democratic nominee, Grover Cleveland, over the Republican nominee, James G. Blaine. Cleveland won the state by a wide margin of 51.84%.

This election marked the beginning of the disfranchisement of African Americans in South Carolina. The process was gradual, and it took about two decades for near-total disfranchisement to occur. By 1882, the Democrats were firmly in power in South Carolina. Republican voters were mostly limited to the majority-black counties of Beaufort and Georgetown. Because the state had a large black-majority population (nearly sixty percent in 1890), white Democrats had narrow margins in many counties and feared a possible resurgence of black Republican voters at the polls. To remove the black threat, the General Assembly created an indirect literacy test, called the "Eight Box Law".

The law required a separate box for ballots for each office; a voter had to insert the ballot into the corresponding box or it would not count. The ballots could not have party symbols on them. They had to be of the correct size and type of paper. Many ballots were arbitrarily rejected because they slightly deviated from the requirements. Ballots could also randomly be rejected if there were more ballots in a box than registered voters.

== Results ==
1884 United States presidential election in South Carolina
Party	Candidate	Running mate	Popular vote		Electoral vote	
Party	Candidate	Running mate	Count	%	Count	%
Democratic	Grover Cleveland of New York	Thomas Andrews Hendricks of Indiana	69,845	75.25%	9	100.00%
Republican	James Gillespie Blaine of Maine	John Alexander Logan of Illinois	21,730	23.41%	0	0.00%
N/A	Others	Others	1,237	1.33%	0	0.00%
Total			92,812	100.00%	9	100.00%

== See also ==
- United States presidential elections in South Carolina
