= 1944 United States presidential election in South Carolina =

- November 7, 1944

Nominee	Franklin D. Roosevelt	Unpledged electors
Party	Democratic	Dixiecrat
Home state	New York
Running mate	Harry S. Truman
Electoral vote	8	0
Popular vote	90,601	7,799
Percentage	87.64%	7.54%
County results
Roosevelt
50–60%
60–70%
70–80%
80–90%
90–100%
President before election
Franklin D. Roosevelt
Democratic
Elected President
Franklin D. Roosevelt
Democratic

The 1944 United States presidential election in South Carolina took place on November 7, 1944, as part of the 1944 United States presidential election. State voters chose 8 electors to the Electoral College, which selected the president and vice president.

For six decades South Carolina had been a one-party state dominated by the Democratic Party. The Republican Party had been moribund due to the disfranchisement of blacks and the complete absence of other support bases as South Carolina completely lacked upland or German refugee whites opposed to secession. Between 1900 and 1940, no Republican presidential candidate had obtained more than seven percent of the total presidential vote – a vote which in 1924 reached as low as 6.6% of the total voting-age population (or approximately 15% of the voting-age white population).

By the time of the 1944 election, however, questions were emerging within the state Democratic Party following the landmark court case of Smith v. Allwright earlier in the year and support for black civil rights by incumbent Vice-president Henry A. Wallace. The liberal drift of the national party on economic issues also worried Southern White Democrats. Although the South did succeed in replacing Wallace on the ticket by border state Democrat Harry S. Truman, for some this was an inadequate compromise, and consequently a slate of “unpledged electors” were placed on the ballot in South Carolina – in the process foreshadowing the Dixiecrat bolt that would begin in the following election to completely transform the state's politics.

Despite fears of what the national Democratic Party might do to the social structure of the South, FDR remained extremely popular in the region. His renomination was supported by over eighty percent of those polled in 1943. Consequently, South Carolina was won by Roosevelt over New York governor Thomas E. Dewey by a landslide margin of 83.18%. The unpledged slate of anti-Roosevelt Southern Democrats received a moderate 7.54% of the vote, doing best among the wealthy planter class in the lowcountry. As of the 2024 presidential election, this constitutes the last election in which Lexington County voted for a Democratic presidential candidate. Thus, this is the last time Democrats swept every county in the state. This was also the first time that Dillon County voted less than 90% for any Democratic candidate.

== Results ==
1944 United States presidential election in South Carolina
Party	Candidate	Running mate	Popular vote		Electoral vote	
Party	Candidate	Running mate	Count	%	Count	%
Democratic	Franklin Delano Roosevelt of New York	Harry S. Truman of Missouri	90,601	87.64%	8	100.00%
N/A	Others	Others	7,799	7.54%	0	0.00%
Republican	Thomas Edmund Dewey of New York	John William Bricker of Ohio	4,610	4.46%	0	0.00%
Prohibition	Claude A. Watson of California	Andrew Nathan Johnson of Kentucky	365	0.35%	0	0.00%
Total			103,375	100.00%	8	100.00%

=== Results by county ===
1944 United States presidential election in South Carolina by county
County	Franklin Delano Roosevelt Democratic		Thomas Edmund Dewey Republican		No Candidate Unpledged Southern Democratic		Claude A. Watson Prohibition		Margin (Note: Because the unpledged slate finished second ahead of Dewey in South Carolina as a whole, all margins given are Roosevelt vote minus unpledged vote unless otherwise stated.)		Total votes cast
County	#	%	#	%	#	%	#	%	#	%	Total votes cast
Abbeville	789	96.34%	19	2.32%	11	1.34%	0	0.00%	770 (Note: In this county where Dewey did finish ahead of the unpledged Southern Democratic slate, margin given is Roosevelt vote minus Dewey vote and percentage margin Roosevelt percentage minus Dewey percentage.)	94.02%	819
Aiken	2,403	91.26%	60	2.28%	167	6.46%	3	0.11%	2,236	84.80%	2,633
Allendale	678	94.43%	8	1.11%	32	4.46%	0	0.00%	646	89.97%	718
Anderson	2,687	90.23%	89	2.99%	201	6.78%	1	0.03%	2,486	83.45%	2,978
Bamberg	737	70.80%	106	10.18%	198	19.02%	0	0.00%	539	51.78%	1,041
Barnwell	1,482	98.41%	8	0.53%	13	1.06%	3	0.20%	1,469	97.35%	1,506
Beaufort	594	74.53%	108	13.55%	95	11.92%	0	0.00%	486	60.98%	797
Berkeley	521	72.77%	32	4.47%	156	22.77%	7	0.98%	365	50.00%	716
Calhoun	602	87.76%	1	0.15%	65	12.10%	18	2.62%	537	75.66%	686
Charleston	6,260	72.95%	1,184	13.80%	1,133	13.25%	4	0.05%	5,076	59.15%	8,581
Cherokee	1,620	94.13%	68	3.95%	31	1.92%	2	0.12%	1,552	90.18%	1,721
Chester	1,441	88.68%	89	5.48%	95	5.85%	0	0.00%	1,346	82.83%	1,625
Chesterfield	3,222	98.77%	15	0.46%	25	0.77%	0	0.00%	3,197	98.00%	3,262
Clarendon	1,053	81.69%	27	2.09%	199	16.21%	10	0.78%	854	65.48%	1,289
Colleton	1,653	82.77%	45	2.25%	289	14.97%	10	0.50%	1,364	67.80%	1,997
Darlington	1,808	91.41%	46	2.33%	119	6.27%	5	0.25%	1,689	85.14%	1,978
Dillon	864	86.06%	27	2.69%	90	11.25%	23	2.29%	774	74.81%	1,004
Dorchester	1,181	70.47%	65	3.88%	422	25.66%	8	0.48%	759	44.81%	1,676
Edgefield	654	92.24%	3	0.42%	52	7.33%	0	0.00%	602	84.91%	709
Fairfield	798	92.47%	21	2.43%	24	5.10%	20	2.32%	774	87.37%	863
Florence	2,822	87.86%	128	3.99%	238	8.16%	24	0.75%	2,584	79.70%	3,212
Georgetown	1,197	85.01%	52	3.69%	159	11.29%	0	0.00%	1,038	73.72%	1,408
Greenville	7,107	87.81%	711	8.78%	265	3.41%	11	0.14%	6,396	79.03%	8,094
Greenwood	2,381	88.64%	71	2.64%	233	8.71%	1	0.04%	2,148	79.93%	2,686
Hampton	575	67.65%	3	0.35%	271	32.00%	1	0.12%	304	35.65%	850
Horry	2,403	88.09%	137	5.02%	183	6.89%	5	0.18%	2,220	81.20%	2,728
Jasper	230	50.66%	18	3.96%	203	45.37%	3	0.66%	27	5.29%	454
Kershaw	1,872	94.98%	21	1.07%	78	3.96%	0	0.00%	1,794	91.02%	1,971
Lancaster	2,383	93.97%	13	0.51%	133	5.52%	7	0.28%	2,250	88.45%	2,536
Laurens	1,924	93.40%	38	1.84%	96	4.76%	2	0.10%	1,828	88.64%	2,060
Lee	764	87.31%	50	5.71%	60	6.97%	1	0.11%	704	80.34%	875
Lexington	1,986	93.68%	20	0.94%	106	5.38%	8	0.38%	1,880	88.30%	2,120
Marion	858	92.86%	9	0.97%	42	6.17%	4	0.44%	816	86.69%	913
Marlboro	874	89.27%	34	3.47%	57	7.25%	0	0.00%	817	82.02%	965
McCormick	307	86.72%	1	0.28%	71	12.99%	0	0.00%	236	73.73%	379
Newberry	1,940	82.80%	70	2.99%	321	14.21%	12	0.51%	1,619	68.59%	2,343
Oconee	1,316	87.85%	106	7.08%	67	5.07%	9	0.60%	1,210	80.77%	1,498
Orangeburg	2,440	90.61%	87	3.23%	159	6.16%	7	0.26%	2,281	84.45%	2,693
Pickens	1,662	67.34%	211	8.55%	505	24.11%	90	3.65%	1,157	43.23%	2,468
Richland	6,590	93.12%	140	1.98%	344	4.90%	3	0.04%	6,246	88.22%	7,077
Saluda	924	85.56%	14	1.30%	141	13.15%	1	0.09%	783	72.41%	1,080
Spartanburg	8,092	92.61%	402	4.60%	205	2.79%	39	0.45%	7,690	88.01%	8,738
Sumter	2,111	87.92%	73	3.04%	217	9.04%	0	0.00%	1,894	78.88%	2,401
Union	3,041	96.48%	33	1.05%	66	2.47%	12	0.38%	2,975	94.01%	3,152
Williamsburg	1,118	86.60%	27	2.09%	142	11.31%	4	0.31%	976	75.29%	1,291
York	2,637	94.48%	127	4.55%	20	0.97%	7	0.25%	2,510	89.93%	2,791
Totals	90,601	87.64%	4,617	4.47%	7,799	7.90%	365	0.35%	82,802	79.74%	103,382
