= 1924 United States presidential election in South Carolina =

- November 4, 1924

Nominee	John W. Davis	Calvin Coolidge
Party	Democratic	Republican
Home state	West Virginia	Massachusetts
Running mate	Charles W. Bryan	Charles G. Dawes (Note: Frank O. Lowden had originally been nominated as Coolidge's running mate, however Lowden declined the nomination and Dawes was chosen instead.)
Electoral vote	9	0
Popular vote	49,008	1,123
Percentage	96.56%	2.21%
County results
Davis
60–70%
80–90%
90–100%
President before election
Calvin Coolidge
Republican
Elected President
Calvin Coolidge
Republican

The 1924 United States presidential election in South Carolina took place on November 4, 1924, as part of the 1924 United States presidential election which was held throughout all contemporary 48 states. Voters chose 9 representatives, or electors to the Electoral College, who voted for president and vice president.

South Carolina voted for the Democratic nominee, Ambassador John W. Davis of West Virginia, over the Republican nominee, incumbent President Calvin Coolidge of Massachusetts. Davis ran with Governor Charles W. Bryan of Nebraska, while Coolidge ran with former Budget Director Charles G. Dawes of Illinois. Also running in this election was the Progressive Party nominee, Senator Robert M. La Follette of Wisconsin and his running mate Senator Burton K. Wheeler of Montana.

Davis won South Carolina by a wide margin of 94.35 percentage points.

== Results ==
1924 United States presidential election in South Carolina
Party	Candidate	Running mate	Popular vote		Electoral vote	
Party	Candidate	Running mate	Count	%	Count	%
Democratic	John William Davis of West Virginia	Charles Wayland Bryan of Nebraska	49,008	96.56%	9	100.00%
Republican	Calvin Coolidge of Massachusetts	Charles Gates Dawes of Illinois	1,123	2.21%	0	0.00%
Progressive	Robert Marion La Follette of Wisconsin	Burton Kendall Wheeler of Montana	620	1.21%	0	0.00%
N/A	Others	Others	1	0.01%	0	0.00%
Total			50,752	100.00%	9	100.00%
