= 1928 United States presidential election in South Carolina =

- November 6, 1928

Nominee	Al Smith	Herbert Hoover
Party	Democratic	Republican
Home state	New York	California
Running mate	Joseph Taylor Robinson	Charles Curtis
Electoral vote	9	0
Popular vote	62,700	5,858
Percentage	91.39%	8.54%
County results
Smith
70–80%
80–90%
90–100%
President before election
Calvin Coolidge
Republican
Elected President
Herbert Hoover
Republican

The 1928 United States presidential election in South Carolina took place on November 6, 1928, as part of the 1928 United States presidential election which was held throughout all contemporary 48 states. Voters chose 9 representatives, or electors to the Electoral College, who voted for president and vice president.

South Carolina voted for the Democratic nominee, Governor Alfred E. Smith of New York, over the Republican nominee, former Secretary of Commerce Herbert Hoover of California. Smith ran with Senator Joseph Taylor Robinson of Arkansas, while Hoover's running mate was Senate Majority Leader Charles Curtis of Kansas.

In the midst of a third Republican landslide, Smith won South Carolina by a margin of 82.85%. Not only was South Carolina Al Smith's best state, it was the largest margin of victory by both Al Smith and Herbert Hoover that year, largely accredited to Southern politics being heavily Democratic and low voter turnout.

The sheer scale of the state's disfranchisement meant that Smith won every county in the state, which he was unable to do even in Mississippi.

== Results ==
1928 United States presidential election in South Carolina
Party	Candidate	Running mate	Popular vote		Electoral vote	
Party	Candidate	Running mate	Count	%	Count	%
Democratic	Al Smith of New York	Joseph Taylor Robinson of Arkansas	62,700	91.39%	9	100.00%
Republican	Herbert Hoover of California	Charles Curtis of Kansas	5,858	8.54%	0	0.00%
Socialist	Norman Thomas of New York	James Hudson Maurer of Pennsylvania	47	0.07%	0	0.00%
Total			68,605	100.00%	9	100.00%
