= Earl Black (political scientist) =

American political scientist

Earl Black was born in Madill, Oklahoma, to his parents Penny Earl and Dorothy Black on February 1, 1942. He is a retired professor of Political Science at Rice University who specialized in studies of the politics of the Southern United States.

Earl Black earned a B.A. at the University of Texas at Austin in 1964 and a Ph.D. from Harvard University in 1968. He has studied the relationship between politics and race or ethnicity in the South.

He has a twin brother, Merle Black. Merle was a professor of political science at Emory University. Earl and Merle have written several books on the politics of the South and the United States as a whole. Their last book together is Divided America: The Ferocious Power Struggle in American Politics (2008).

== Works ==
- Politics and Society in the South, Harvard University Press, paperback 1989. ISBN 9780674689596
- The Vital South: How Presidents are Elected, 1992 (with Merle Black)
- The Rise of Southern Republicans, Harvard University Press, 2002. ISBN 0-674-00728-X
- Divided America: The Ferocious Power Struggle in American Politics, 2008
