= Merle Black =

Political scientist

P. Merle Black
- Born: 1942 (age 83–84)
- Education: Harvard University; University of Chicago
- Scientific career
- Fields: Political science; Southern American politics
- Workplaces: Emory University; University of North Carolina at Chapel Hill

P. Merle Black (born 1942) is a retired American political scientist. He was formerly Asa Griggs Candler Professor of Political Science at Emory University. He specializes in Southern politics, particularly in the 20th and 21st centuries.

== Career ==
Black attended Harvard University, where he graduated with a bachelor's degree in 1964. He then joined the Peace Corps, and spent two years teaching in Liberia. After completing his Peace Corps assignment, Black enrolled as a graduate student at the University of Chicago where he would complete both a Master's Degree and a PhD. At the start of his graduate studies he focused broadly on global politics, but during the course of his PhD he shifted focus to the politics of the American south.

In 1970, Black joined the political science faculty at the University of North Carolina at Chapel Hill, and in 1989 he moved to Emory University, until his retirement in 2016.

Black's twin brother, Earl Black, was a longtime professor at Rice University, and the two coauthored several books on politics in the Southern United States. These include Politics and Society in the South and The Vital South.

Black was President of the Southern Political Science Association from 2002 to 2003. Black won the Southern Political Science Association's 2004 V. O. Key award, together with Taeku Lee as well as his brother Earl Black.
