= 2016 South Carolina Republican presidential primary =

- February 20, 2016
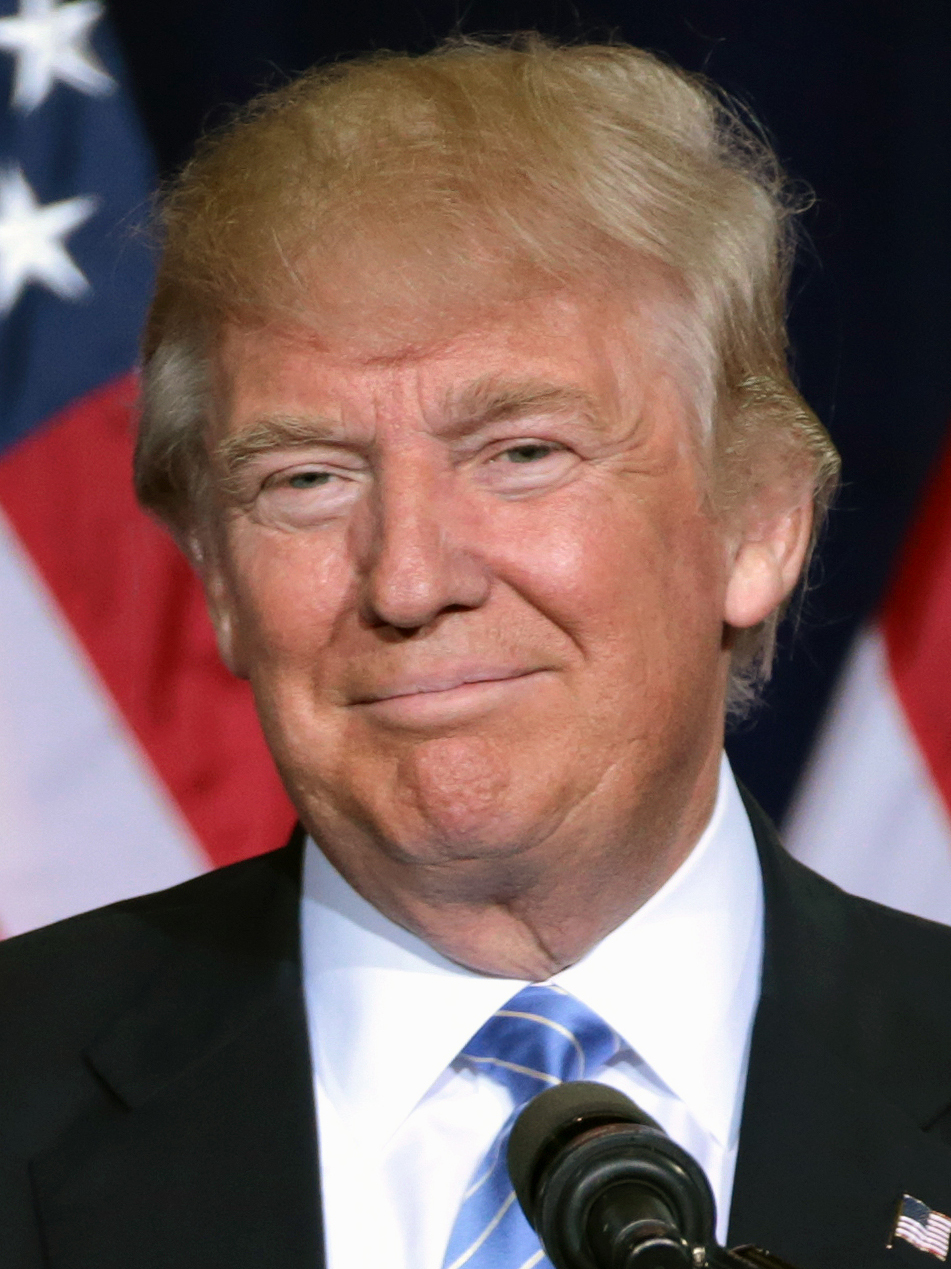

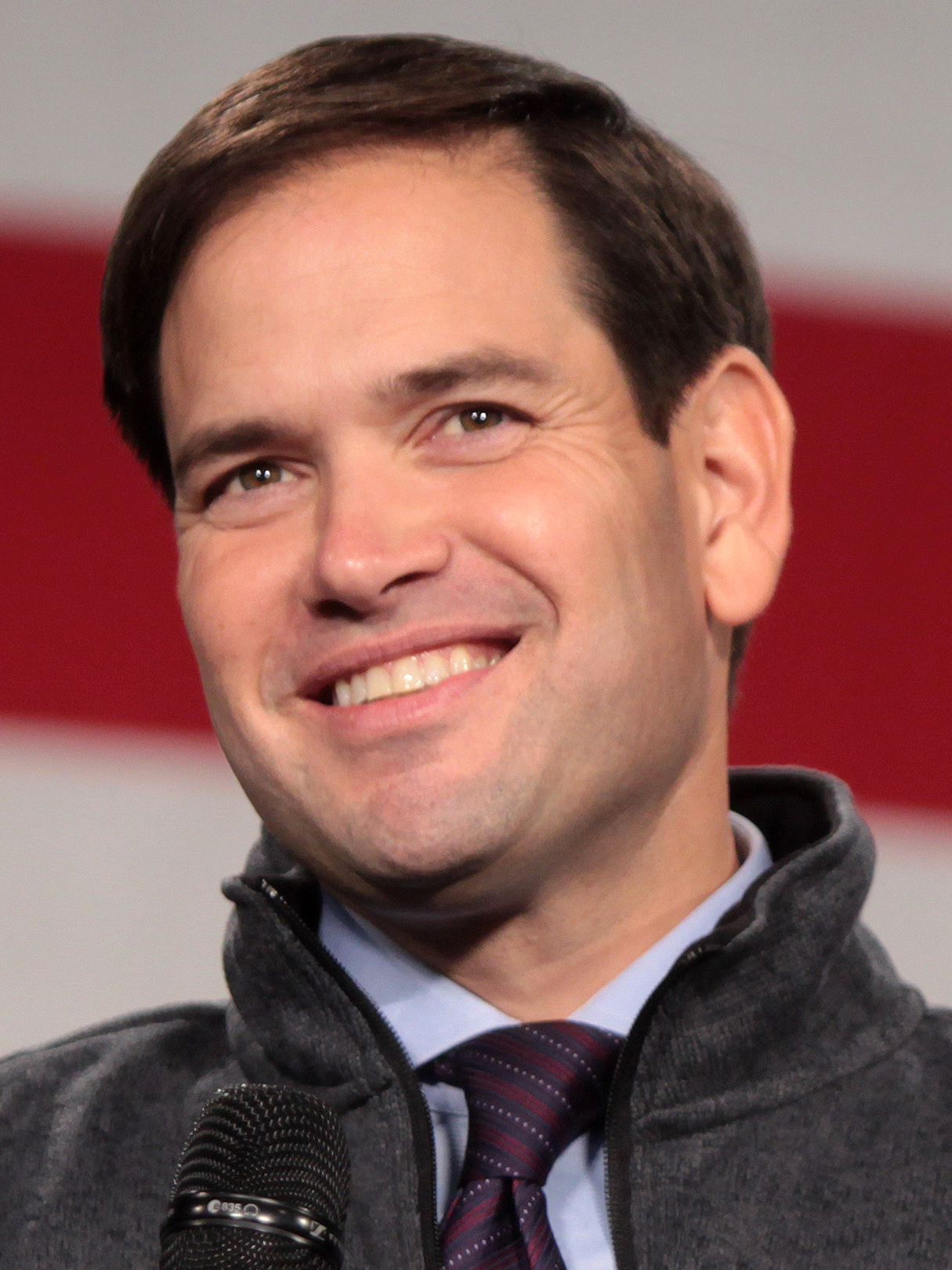

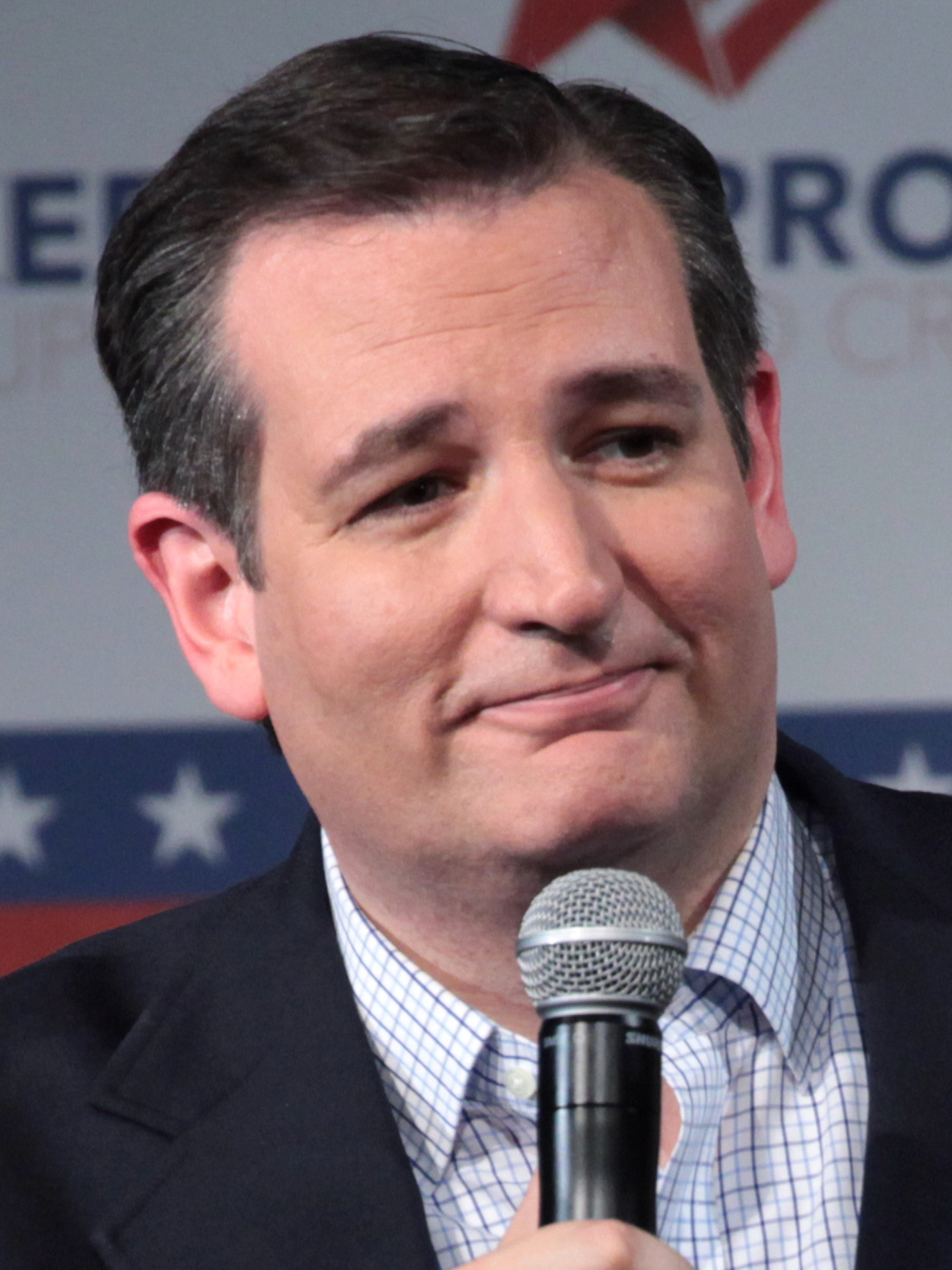

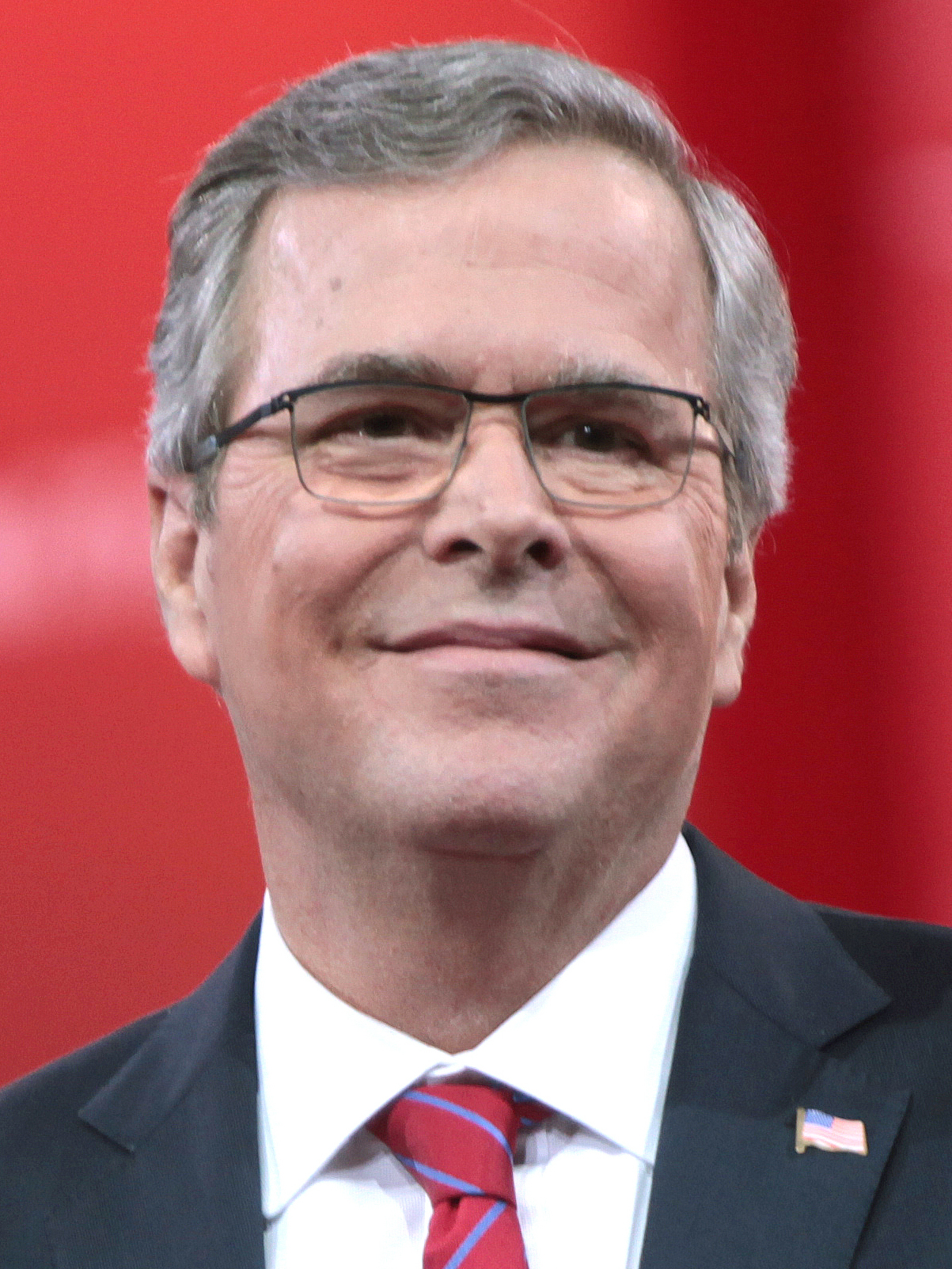

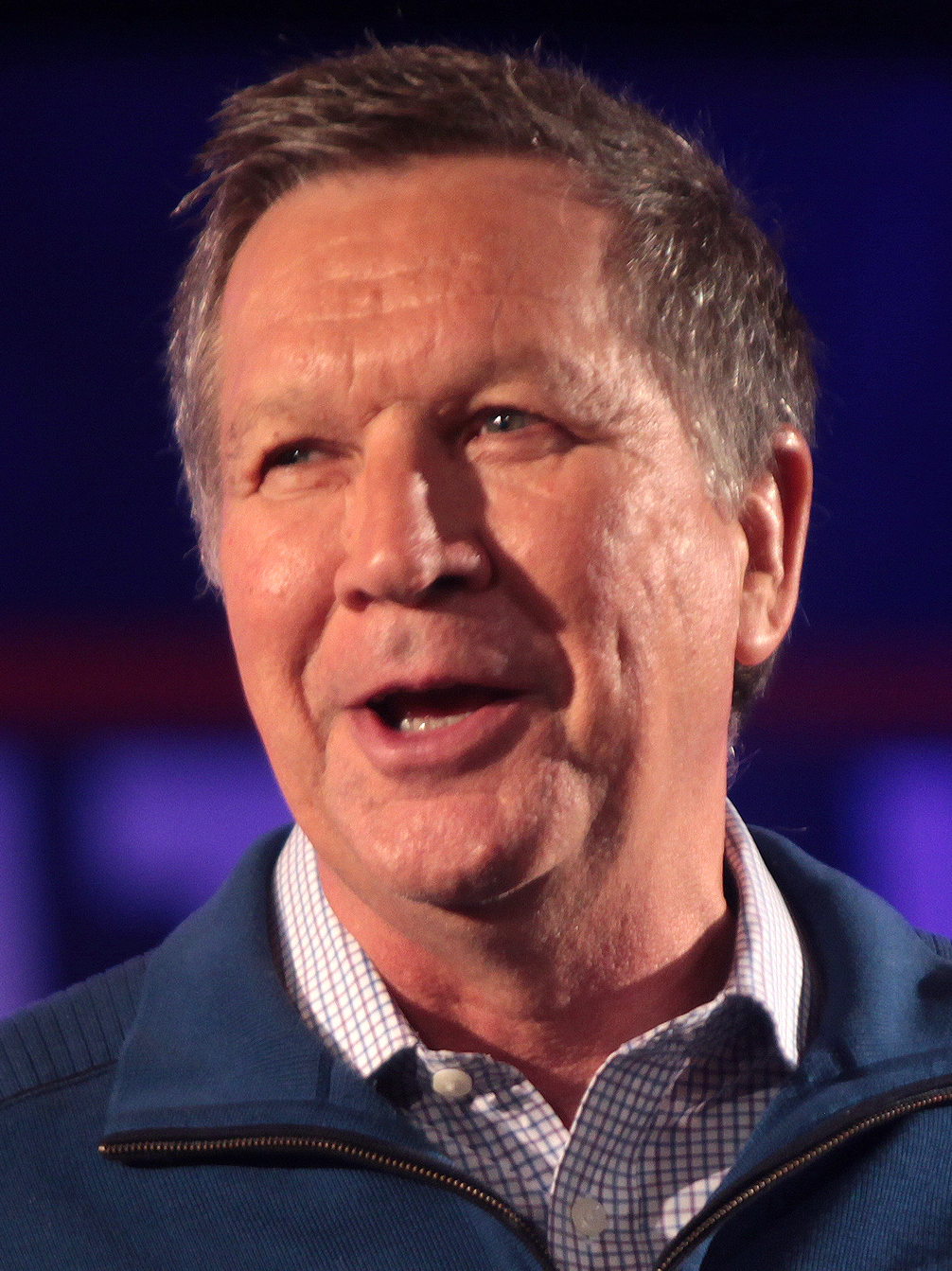

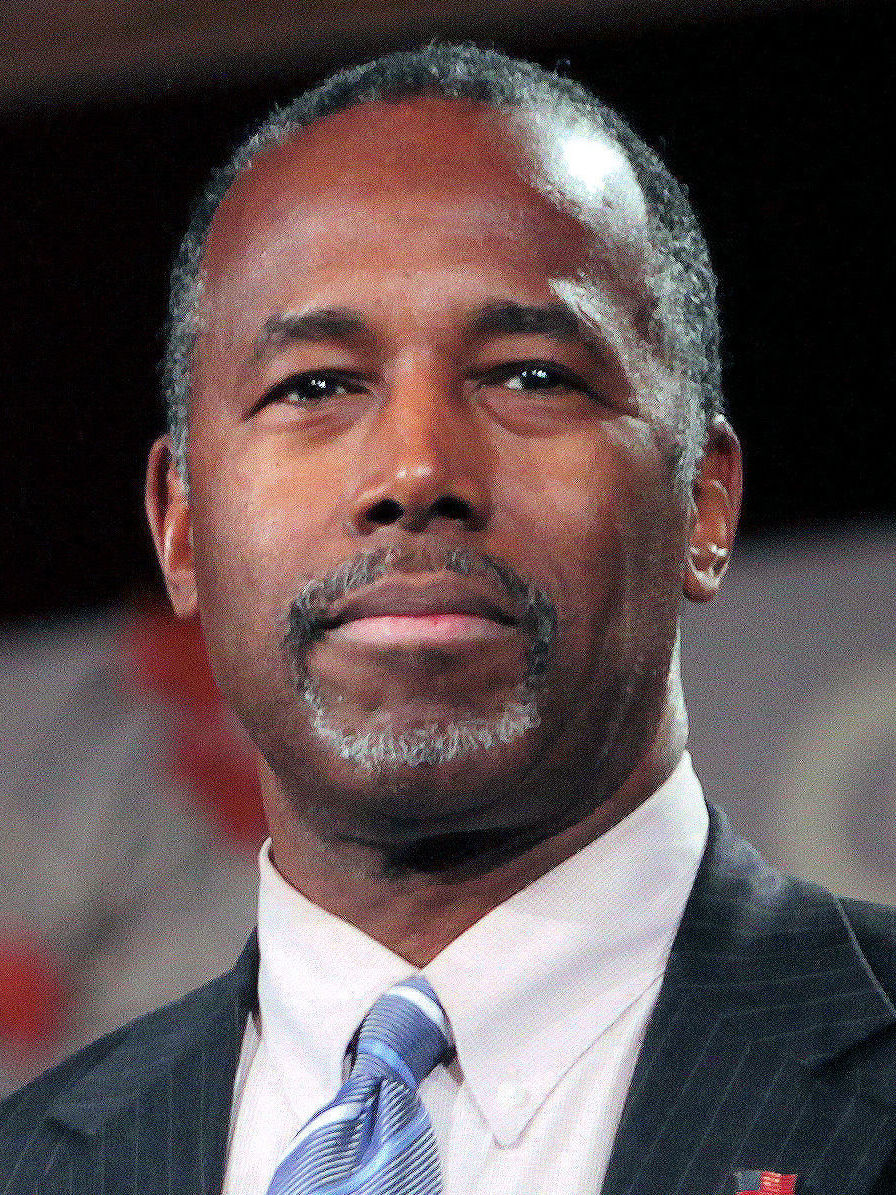
Candidate	Donald Trump	Marco Rubio	Ted Cruz
Home state	New York	Florida	Texas
Delegate count	50	0	0
Popular vote	240,882	166,565	165,417
Percentage	32.51%	22.48%	22.33%
Candidate	Jeb Bush	John Kasich	Ben Carson
Home state	Florida	Ohio	Virginia
Delegate count	0	0	0
Popular vote	58,056	56,410	53,551
Percentage	7.84%	7.61%	7.23%
County results
Donald Trump
20–30%
30–40%
40–50%
Marco Rubio
20–30%

The 2016 South Carolina Republican presidential primary took place on February 20 in the U.S. state of South Carolina, marking the Republican Party's third nominating contest in their series of presidential primaries ahead of the 2016 presidential election.

The Democratic Party held its Nevada caucuses on the same day, while their South Carolina primary would only take place a week later on February 27.

The states delegates are allocated in this way: 29 delegates are awarded to the winner of the primary; 3 delegates are awarded to the winner of each of the seven congressional districts.

Donald Trump demonstrated his strength over the other candidates, winning among Southern White Evangelical Christians. Marco Rubio, who had the support of then-Governor Nikki Haley, managed second place due to his support among college graduates.

Following a poor result in the primary, Jeb Bush announced the suspension of his campaign.

== Forums and debates ==
January 9, 2016 – Columbia, South Carolina The Kemp Forum was held in the Columbia Metropolitan Convention Center by the Jack Kemp Foundation. Bush, Carson, Christie, Fiorina, Huckabee, Kasich, and Rubio attended. The forum was moderated by Speaker of the House Paul Ryan and Senator Tim Scott.

January 14, 2016 – North Charleston, South Carolina

Candidate	Airtime	Polls
Trump	17:12	34.5%
Cruz	17:52	19.3%
Rubio	14:19	11.8%
Carson	8:26	9.0%
Christie	14:25	3.5%
Bush	12:36	4.8%
Kasich	12:26	2.3%

Candidate	Airtime	Polls
Fiorina	12:06	2.8%
Paul	N/A	2.3%
Huckabee	13:00	1.8%
Santorum	12:18	0.0%

On December 8, 2015, it was announced that Fox Business Network would host an additional debate two days after the State of the Union address. The debate was held in the North Charleston Coliseum in North Charleston, South Carolina. The anchor and managing editor of Business News, Neil Cavuto, and anchor and global markets editor, Maria Bartiromo, reprised their roles as moderators for the prime-time debate, which began at 9 p.m. EST. The earlier debate, which started at 6 p.m. EST, was again moderated by anchors Trish Regan and Sandra Smith.

On December 22, 2015, Fox Business Network announced that in order to qualify for the prime-time debate, candidates had to either: place in the top six nationally, based on an average of the five most recent national polls recognized by FOX News; place in the top five in Iowa, based on an average of the five most recent Iowa state polls recognized by FOX News; or place in the top five in New Hampshire, based on an average of the five most recent New Hampshire state polls recognized by FOX News. In order to qualify for the first debate, candidates must have registered at least one percent in one of the five most recent national polls.

On January 11, 2016, seven candidates were revealed to have been invited to the prime-time debate: Jeb Bush, Ben Carson, Chris Christie, Ted Cruz, John Kasich, Marco Rubio, and Donald Trump. The participants were introduced in order of their poll rankings at the debate.

Carly Fiorina, Mike Huckabee, and Rick Santorum participated in the undercard debate. Rand Paul was also invited to the undercard debate, but said, "I won't participate in anything that's not first tier because we have a first tier campaign." The candidates were introduced in order of their poll rankings. The first question was to assess the economy. The next questions asked Fiorina about the role of the US in the world, Santorum about the Iran deal, and Huckabee about the solution to Afghanistan's problems.

February 13, 2016 – Greenville, South Carolina The ninth debate, and second debate in the month of February, was held in another early primary state of South Carolina, and aired on CBS News. The debate was moderated by John Dickerson in the Peace Center, began at 9 p.m. ET and lasted for 90 minutes.

== Endorsements ==
Jeb Bush

Statewide officials

- Molly Spearman, Superintendent of Education (2015-Present)
- Hugh Weathers, Agriculture Commissioner (2004-Present)

U.S. Senators

- Lindsey Graham, U.S. Senator (2003-Present)

State Senators

- Ross Turner, State Senator from the 8th district (2013-Present)
- Katrina Shealy, State Senator from the 23rd district (2013-Present)
- Paul Thurmond, State Senator from the 41st district (2009-Present)

State Representatives

- Samuel Rivers Jr., State Representative from the 15th district (2013-Present)
- Bruce W. Bannister, State Representative from the 24th district (2006-Present)
- Dennis Moss, State Representative from the 29th district (2007-Present)
- Ralph Norman, State Representative from the 48th district (2009-Present)
- Rick Quinn Jr., State Representative from the 69th district (2010-Present)
- Kirkman Finlay III, State Representative from the 75th district (2012-Present)
Ted Cruz

U.S. Representatives

- Mark Sanford, SC-01 (2013–Present)
- Jeff Duncan, SC-03 (2011–Present)

State Senators

- Lee Bright, State Senator from the 12th district (2009-Present)

State Representatives

- Mike Burns, State Representative from the 17th district (2013-Present)
- Wendy Nanney, State Representative from the 22nd district (2009-Present)
- Garry R. Smith, State Representative from the 27th district (2003-Present)
- Bill Chumley, State Representative from the 35th district (2011-Present)
John Kasich

State Senators

- Greg Gregory, State Senator from the 16th district (2011-Present)
- Ronnie Cromer, State Senator from the 18th district (2003-Present)
- Raymond Cleary, State Senator from the 34th district (2005-Present)
- Paul G. Campbell Jr., State Senator from the 44th district (2007-Present)

State Representatives

- Gary Clary, State Representative from the 3rd district (2015-Present)
- Phyllis Henderson, State Representative from the 21st district (2010-Present)
- Heather Ammons Crawford, State Representative from the 68th district (2012-Present)
- Chip Limehouse, State Representative from the 110th district (2015-Present)
- Jeff Bradley, State Representative from the 123rd district (2015-Present)

Newspapers

- The State (Columbia)
- The Post and Courier (Charleston)
Marco Rubio

Statewide officials

- Nikki Haley, Governor (2011-Present)

U.S. Senators

- Tim Scott, U.S. Senator (2013-Present)

U.S. Representatives

- Joe Wilson, SC-02 (2001–Present)
- Trey Gowdy, SC-04 (2011–Present)

State Senators

- Larry Grooms, State Senator from the 37th district (1997-Present)

State Representatives

- Neal Collins, State Representative from the 5th district (2015-Present)
- Dan Hamilton, State Representative from the 20th district (2009-Present)
- Todd Atwater, State Representative from the 87th district (2011-Present)

Mayors

- Knox H. White, Greenville Mayor (1995-Present)
Donald Trump

Statewide officials

- Henry McMaster, Lieutenant Governor (2015-Present)

State Representatives

- Mike Ryhal, State Representative from the 56th district (2013-Present)
- James H. Merrill, State Representative from the 99th district (2001-Present)

=== Withdrawn candidates ===
Mike Huckabee (Withdrawn)

State Representatives

- Greg Delleney, State Representative from the 43rd district (2003-Present)
Rand Paul (Withdrawn)

U.S. Representatives

- Mick Mulvaney, SC-05 (2011–Present)

State Senators

- Tom Davis, State Senator from the 46th district (2009-Present)

State Representatives

- Michael Pitts, State Representative from the 14th district (2003-Present)
- Peter M. McCoy Jr., State Representative from the 115th district (2011-Present)

== Polling ==
=== Aggregate polls ===
Source of poll aggregation	Dates administered	Dates updated	Marco Rubio Republican	Donald Trump Republican	Ted Cruz Republican	Jeb Bush Republican	Margin
RealClearPolitics	until February 20, 2016	February 20, 2016	18.8%	31.8%	18.5%	10.7%	Trump +13.0
FiveThirtyEight	until February 20, 2016	February 20, 2016	19.8%	30.5%	19.5%	11.4%	Trump +10.7

Poll source	Date	1st	2nd	3rd	Other
Primary results	February 20, 2016	Donald Trump32.51%	Marco Rubio22.48%	Ted Cruz22.33%	Jeb Bush 7.84%, John Kasich 7.61%, Ben Carson 7.23%
Opinion Savvy/ Augusta Chronicle Margin of error: ± 3.5% Sample size: 780	February 18–19, 2016	Donald Trump; 26.9%	Marco Rubio; 24.1%	Ted Cruz 18.8%	Jeb Bush 10.6%, Ben Carson 8.2%, John Kasich 7.5%, Undecided 3.9%
South Carolina House GOP Margin of error: ± 2.0% Sample size: 3500	February 18, 2016	Donald Trump; 33.51%	Ted Cruz 18.96%	Marco Rubio 18.07%	Jeb Bush 11.56%, John Kasich 8.49%, Ben Carson 5.22%, Undecided 4.19%
National Research Margin of error: ± ?% Sample size: 500	February 17–18, 2016	Donald Trump; 32%	Ted Cruz 19%	Marco Rubio 18%	Jeb Bush 8%, John Kasich 7%, Ben Carson 6%, Refused 2%, Undecided 7%
ARG Margin of error: ± 5.0% Sample size: 401	February 17–18, 2016	Donald Trump; 34%	Marco Rubio 22%	John Kasich 14%	Ted Cruz 13%, Jeb Bush 9%, Ben Carson 4%, Other 1%, Undecided 3%
Emerson College Margin of error: ± 4.7% Sample size: 418	February 16–18, 2016	Donald Trump; 36%	Ted Cruz 19%	Marco Rubio 18%	John Kasich 10%, Jeb Bush 10%, Ben Carson 6%
Clemson University Margin of error: ± 3.0% Sample size: 650	February 14–18, 2016	Donald Trump; 28%	Ted Cruz 19%	Marco Rubio 15%	Jeb Bush 10%, John Kasich 9%, Ben Carson 6%, Undecided 13%
ARG Margin of error: ± 5.0% Sample size: 400	February 16–17, 2016	Donald Trump; 33%	Marco Rubio 20%	John Kasich 15%	Ted Cruz 13%, Jeb Bush 8%, Ben Carson 3%, Other 1%, Undecided 7%
Harper Polling Margin of error: ± 4% Sample size: 599	February 16–17, 2016	Donald Trump; 29%	Ted Cruz 17%	Marco Rubio 15%	Jeb Bush 14%, John Kasich 13%, Ben Carson 8%, Undecided 5%
NBC News/Wall Street Journal/Marist College Margin of error: ± 3.6% Sample size: 722	February 15–17, 2016	Donald Trump; 28%	Ted Cruz 23%	Marco Rubio 15%	Jeb Bush 13%, Ben Carson 9%, John Kasich 9%, Undecided 5%
Fox News Margin of error: ± 3.5% Sample size: 759	February 15–17, 2016	Donald Trump; 32%	Ted Cruz 19%	Marco Rubio 15%	Jeb Bush 9%, Ben Carson 9%, John Kasich 6%, Other 1%, Undecided 8%
Emerson College Margin of error: ± 5.0% Sample size: 315	February 15–16, 2016	Donald Trump; 33%	Ted Cruz 20%	Marco Rubio 19%	John Kasich 9%, Jeb Bush 9%, Ben Carson 5%, Other 1%, Undecided 4%
ARG Margin of error: ± 5.0% Sample size: 400	February 14–16, 2016	Donald Trump; 33%	Marco Rubio 16%	Ted Cruz 14%	John Kasich 14%, Jeb Bush 9%, Ben Carson 3%, Other 2%, Undecided 8%
Monmouth University Margin of error: ± 4.9% Sample size: 400	February 14–16, 2016	Donald Trump; 35%	Ted Cruz 19%	Marco Rubio 17%	John Kasich 9%, Jeb Bush 8%, Ben Carson 7%, Undecided 5%
Bloomberg/Selzer Margin of error: ± 4.4% Sample size: 502	February 13–16, 2016	Donald Trump; 36%	Ted Cruz 17%	Marco Rubio 15%	Jeb Bush 13%, Ben Carson 9%, John Kasich 7%, Undecided 3%
Public Policy Polling Margin of error: ± 3.3% Sample size: 897	February 14–15, 2016	Donald Trump; 35%	Ted Cruz 18%	Marco Rubio 18%	John Kasich 10%, Jeb Bush 7%, Ben Carson 7%, Undecided 6%
South Carolina House GOP Margin of error: ± 2.4% Sample size: 1700	February 15, 2016	Donald Trump; 33.57%	Ted Cruz 15.54%	Marco Rubio 14.83%	Jeb Bush 14.54%, John Kasich 7.98%, Ben Carson 6.55%, Undecided 7.03%
CNN/ORC Margin of error: ± 5% Sample size: 404	February 10–15, 2016	Donald Trump; 38%	Ted Cruz 22%	Marco Rubio 14%	Jeb Bush 10%, Ben Carson 6%, John Kasich 4%, Jim Gilmore 1%, Someone Else 1%, Undecided 1%, No Opinion 3%
ARG Margin of error: ± 5.0% Sample size: 400	February 12–13, 2016	Donald Trump; 35%	John Kasich 15%	Marco Rubio 14%	Ted Cruz 12%, Jeb Bush 10%, Ben Carson 2%, Other 2%, Undecided 10%
South Carolina House GOP Margin of error: ± ?% Sample size: 1200	February 11–12, 2016	Donald Trump; 34.5%	Ted Cruz 15.5%	Jeb Bush 13%	Marco Rubio 12.5%, John Kasich 8.5%, Ben Carson 5%, Undecided 11%
CBS News/YouGov Margin of error: ± 5.2% Sample size: 744	February 10–12, 2016	Donald Trump; 42%	Ted Cruz 20%	Marco Rubio 15%	John Kasich 9%, Jeb Bush 6%, Ben Carson 6%, Chris Christie 1%, Carly Fiorina 0%, Jim Gilmore 0%, No preference 1%
Opinion Savvy/ Augusta Chronicle Margin of error: ± 3.5% Sample size: 779	February 10–11, 2016	Donald Trump; 36.3%	Ted Cruz 19.6%	Marco Rubio 14.6%	Jeb Bush 10.9%, John Kasich 8.7%, Ben Carson 4.7%, Undecided 5.2%
NBC/WSJ/Marist Margin of error: ± 3.7% Sample size: 718	January 17–23, 2016	Donald Trump; 36%	Ted Cruz 20%	Marco Rubio 14%	Jeb Bush 9%, Ben Carson 8%, Mike Huckabee 2%, Chris Christie 2%, Rand Paul 1%, John Kasich 1%, Carly Fiorina 1%, Other 0%, Undecided 6%
CBS/YouGov Margin of error: ± 5.3% Sample size: 804	January 18–21, 2016	Donald Trump; 40%	Ted Cruz 21%	Marco Rubio 13%	Ben Carson 9%, Jeb Bush 8%, Rand Paul 3%, Mike Huckabee 2%, John Kasich 2%, Chris Christie 1%, Carly Fiorina 1%, Rick Santorum 0%, Jim Gilmore 0%, No Preference 0%
Morris News/Opinion Savvy Margin of error: ± 3.7% Sample size: 683	January 15, 2016	Donald Trump; 32%	Ted Cruz 18%	Jeb Bush 13%	Marco Rubio 11%, Ben Carson 9%, Chris Christie 4%, Carly Fiorina 3%, Mike Huckabee 2%, John Kasich 2%, Rand Paul 2%, Rick Santorum 1%, Undecided 3%
Associated Industries of Florida Margin of error: ± 3.9% Sample size: 600	December 16–17, 2015	Donald Trump; 27%	Ted Cruz; 27%	Marco Rubio 12%	Ben Carson 11%, Jeb Bush 7%, Others 5%, Undecided 11%
CBS News/YouGov Margin of error: ± 5% Sample size: 1469	December 14–17, 2015	Donald Trump; 38%	Ted Cruz 23%	Marco Rubio 12%	Ben Carson 9%, Jeb Bush 7%, Rand Paul 4%, John Kasich 2%, Chris Christie 1%, Carly Fiorina 1%, Mike Huckabee 1%, Lindsey Graham 1%, Rick Santorum 0%, George Pataki 0%, Jim Gilmore 0%, No preference 1%
Opinion Savvy/Augusta Chronicle Margin of error: ± 4.2% Sample size: 536	December 16, 2015	Donald Trump; 28.3%	Ted Cruz 21.1%	Marco Rubio 11.6%	Jeb Bush 9.6%, Ben Carson 9.5%, Chris Christie 5.5%, Carly Fiorina 4.6%, Rand Paul 2.6%, Mike Huckabee 2.1%, Lindsey Graham 1.9%, John Kasich 1.4%, Rick Santorum 0.5%, George Pataki 0.2%, Undecided 1.3%
Winthrop University Margin of error: ± 3.4% Sample size: 828	November 30 – December 7, 2015	Donald Trump; 24%	Ted Cruz 16%	Ben Carson 14%	Marco Rubio 11%, Jeb Bush 9%, Mike Huckabee 2%, Lindsey Graham 2%, Carly Fiorina 1%, Rand Paul 1%, Chris Christie 1%, John Kasich 1%, Rick Santorum 0%, George Pataki 0%
Fox News Margin of error: ± 4.5% Sample size: 437	December 5–8, 2015	Donald Trump; 35%	Ben Carson 15%	Marco Rubio/Ted Cruz 14%	Jeb Bush 5%, Rand Paul 2%, Lindsey Graham 2%, Chris Christie 2%, Carly Fiorina 1%, John Kasich 1%, Mike Huckabee 1%, Rick Santorum 1%, George Pataki 0%, None of the Above 1%, Don't Know 5%
CBS News/YouGov Margin of error: ± 5.1% Sample size: ?	November 15–19, 2015	Donald Trump; 35%	Ben Carson 19%	Marco Rubio 16%	Ted Cruz 13%, Jeb Bush 5%, Lindsey Graham 3%, Carly Fiorina 2%, Mike Huckabee 2%, John Kasich 2%, Chris Christie 1%, Rand Paul 1%, Rick Santorum 1%, George Pataki 0%, Bobby Jindal 0%, Jim Gilmore 0%
Public Policy Polling Margin of error: ± 3.5% Sample size: 787	November 7–8, 2015	Donald Trump; 25%	Ben Carson 21%	Ted Cruz 15%	Marco Rubio 13%, Jeb Bush 8%, Carly Fiorina 5%, John Kasich 3%, Lindsey Graham 2%, Mike Huckabee 2%, Rand Paul 1%, Chris Christie 1%, Rick Santorum 1%, Bobby Jindal 0%, Jim Gilmore 0%, George Pataki 0%, Undecided 3%
CBS News/YouGov Margin of error: ± 3.4% Sample size: 843	October 15–23, 2015	Donald Trump; 40%	Ben Carson 23%	Ted Cruz 8%	Marco Rubio 7%, Jeb Bush 6%, Carly Fiorina 3%, Lindsey Graham 2%, Mike Huckabee 2%, John Kasich 2%, Rand Paul 1%, Chris Christie 1%, Bobby Jindal 1%, Rick Santorum 1%, Jim Gilmore 0%, George Pataki 0%, No Preference 5%
Clemson-Palmetto Margin of error: ± 4% Sample size: 600	October 13–23, 2015	Donald Trump; 23%	Ben Carson; 19%	Ted Cruz 8%	Carly Fiorina 6%, Jeb Bush 7%, Marco Rubio 5%, Lindsey Graham 3%, Rand Paul 1%, Mike Huckabee 2%, Chris Christie 1%, John Kasich 2%, Bobby Jindal 1%, Rick Santorum 0%, Jim Gilmore 0%, George Pataki 0%, undecided/DK 15%
CNN/ORC Margin of error: ± 4.5% Sample size: 521	October 3–10, 2015	Donald Trump; 36%	Ben Carson 18%	Marco Rubio 9%	Carly Fiorina 7%, Jeb Bush 6%, Ted Cruz 5%, Lindsey Graham 5%, Rand Paul 4%, Mike Huckabee 3%, Chris Christie 2%, John Kasich 1%, Rick Santorum 1%, Jim Gilmore *%, George Pataki *% Bobby Jindal *%, None 1%, No opinion 4%
Gravis Marketing Margin of error: ± 3.6% Sample size: 762	October 1, 2015	Donald Trump; 29.1%	Ben Carson 16.4%	Carly Fiorina 11.1%	Ted Cruz 8.1%, Marco Rubio 8%, Jeb Bush 5.9%, John Kasich 3.5%, Mike Huckabee 3.1%, Lindsey Graham 1.5%, Chris Christie 1.4%, Rand Paul 0.9%, Rick Santorum 0.5%, George Pataki 0.3% Bobby Jindal 0.3%, Unsure 9.9%
CBS News/YouGov Margin of error: ± 4.5% Sample size: 1002	September 3–10, 2015	Donald Trump; 36%	Ben Carson 21%	Ted Cruz 6%	Lindsey Graham 5%, Jeb Bush 5%, John Kasich 4%, Mike Huckabee 3%, Carly Fiorina 3%, Marco Rubio 3%, Scott Walker 3%, Chris Christie 2%, Bobby Jindal 1%, Rick Santorum 1%, Rand Paul 1%, Rick Perry 0%, George Pataki 0%, Jim Gilmore 0%, No preference 5%
Public Policy Polling Margin of error: ± 3.6% Sample size: 764	September 3–6, 2015	Donald Trump; 37%	Ben Carson 21%	Ted Cruz 6%	Jeb Bush 6%, Carly Fiorina 4%, John Kasich 4%, Marco Rubio 4%, Lindsey Graham 3%, Mike Huckabee 3%, Scott Walker 3%, Rand Paul 3%, Rick Santorum 2%, Rick Perry 1%, Chris Christie 1%, Bobby Jindal 1%, George Pataki 0%, Jim Gilmore 0%
Monmouth University Margin of error: ± 4.6% Sample size: 453	August 20–23, 2015	Donald Trump; 30%	Ben Carson 15%	Jeb Bush 9%	Carly Fiorina 6%, Marco Rubio 6%, Ted Cruz 5%, Lindsey Graham 4%, Scott Walker 4%, John Kasich 3%, Mike Huckabee 3%, Rand Paul 3%, Chris Christie 2%, Rick Santorum 1%, Rick Perry 0%, George Pataki 0%, Bobby Jindal 0%, Jim Gilmore 0%, Undecided 11%
Opinion Savvy/Insider Advantage Margin of error: ± 4.3% Sample size: 509	August 3, 2015	Donald Trump; 31.3%	Jeb Bush 13.9%	Ben Carson 9.9%	Mike Huckabee 8.5%, Lindsey Graham 6.5%, Scott Walker 5.8%, Ted Cruz 4.3%, Chris Christie 4.1%, John Kasich 3.1%, Marco Rubio 2.3%, Carly Fiorina 1.8%, Rand Paul 1.7%, Bobby Jindal 0.7%, Rick Perry 0.6%, Rick Santorum 0.1%, George Pataki 0%, Someone else 3.1%, Undecided 2.5%
Gravis Marketing Margin of error: ± 4.0% Sample size: 609	July 29–30, 2015	Donald Trump; 34%	Ben Carson 10.9%	Jeb Bush 10.5%	Scott Walker 10.3%, Marco Rubio 6%, Mike Huckabee 5.5%, Lindsey Graham 4.9%, Ted Cruz 3.4%, John Kasich 3.3%, Chris Christie 2.5%, Rick Perry 2.5%, Carly Fiorina 2.4%, Rick Santorum 1.3%, Rand Paul 1%, Bobby Jindal 0.9%, George Pataki 0.7%
Morning Consult Margin of error: ± 5.0% Sample size: 389	May 31 – June 8, 2015	Lindsey Graham; 14%	Ben Carson; 12%	Jeb Bush; 11%	Scott Walker 10%, Marco Rubio 8%, Mike Huckabee 7%, Ted Cruz 6%, Chris Christie 5%, Rand Paul 5%, Donald Trump 2%, Carly Fiorina 1%, Don't know/No Opinion/Refused 16%, Someone else 2%
Winthrop University Margin of error: ± 3.2% Sample size: 956	April 4–12, 2015	Scott Walker; 13.6%	Jeb Bush; 12.7%	Ted Cruz 8.1%	Lindsey Graham 7.6%, Rand Paul 6.2%, Chris Christie 5%, Ben Carson 4.9%, Mike Huckabee 4.9%, Marco Rubio 4%, Rick Perry 1.9%, Donald Trump 1.9%, Bobby Jindal 0.9%, Rick Santorum 0.3%, John Bolton 0.2%, Other 1.4%, Undecided 25.1%
Gravis Marketing Margin of error: ± 3% Sample size: 1,371	March 26–27, 2015	Scott Walker; 17%	Jeb Bush; 16%	Ted Cruz 13%	Lindsey Graham 9%, Mike Huckabee 7%, Chris Christie 6%, Marco Rubio 6%, Rand Paul 5%, Rick Santorum 2%, Carly Fiorina 2%, Undecided 18%
Gravis Marketing Margin of error: ± 3% Sample size: 792	February 24–25, 2015	Jeb Bush; 19%	Scott Walker; 17%	Lindsey Graham 12%	Mike Huckabee 10%, Chris Christie 8%, Rand Paul 6%, Marco Rubio 6%, Ted Cruz 2%, Carly Fiorina 2%, Rick Santorum 2%, Undecided 16%
Public Policy Polling Margin of error: ± 4.3% Sample size: 525	February 12–15, 2015	Jeb Bush; 19%	Scott Walker; 18%	Ben Carson 13%	Lindsey Graham 13%, Mike Huckabee 12%, Chris Christie 7%, Rand Paul 5%, Ted Cruz 3%, Rick Perry 3%, Other/Undecided 6%
NBC News/Marist Margin of error: ± 4.6% Sample size: 450	February 3–10, 2015	Lindsey Graham; 17%	Jeb Bush; 15%	Scott Walker 12%	Ben Carson 10%, Mike Huckabee 10%, Rand Paul 7%, Chris Christie 6%, Rick Perry 4%, Marco Rubio 4%, Rick Santorum 3%, Ted Cruz 1%, Undecided 11%
Gravis Marketing Margin of error: ± 3% Sample size: 831	January 21–22, 2015	Mitt Romney; 20%	Jeb Bush 16%	Scott Walker 9%	Ted Cruz 8%, Mike Huckabee 8%, Rand Paul 7%, Marco Rubio 7%, Chris Christie 5%, Rick Perry 4%, Rick Santorum 4%, Undecided 12%
Gravis Marketing Margin of error: ± 3% Sample size: 831	January 21–22, 2015	Jeb Bush; 18%	Mike Huckabee 11%	Scott Walker 11%	Ted Cruz 9%, Marco Rubio 9%, Chris Christie 8%, Rand Paul 8%, Rick Perry 5%, Rick Santorum 4%, Undecided 17%
Clemson University Margin of error: ± 6% Sample size: 400	May 22–29, 2014	Jeb Bush; 22%	Chris Christie 10%	Ted Cruz 9%	Rand Paul 9%, Marco Rubio 6%, Bobby Jindal 3%, Undecided/Don't know 48%
Gravis Marketing Margin of error: ± 4% Sample size: 735	March 6–7, 2014	Jeb Bush; 22%	Mike Huckabee; 19%	Chris Christie 12%	Ted Cruz 8%, Rand Paul 8%, Marco Rubio 6%, Scott Walker 5%, Rick Santorum 2%, Undecided 19%
Gravis Marketing Margin of error: ± 4% Sample size: 601	November 30 – December 2, 2013	Chris Christie; 16.6%	Jeb Bush; 16%	Mike Huckabee; 15.8%	Ted Cruz 11.1%, Rand Paul 9.7%, Marco Rubio 7.2%, Rick Santorum 2.8%, Scott Walker 2.3%, Undecided 18.5%
Harper Polling Margin of error: ± 5.03% Sample size: 379	October 27–28, 2013	Chris Christie; 19%	Ted Cruz; 17%	Rand Paul 13%	Marco Rubio 12%, Paul Ryan 12%, Bobby Jindal 6%, Not sure 21%

== Results ==
Primary date: February 20, 2016
District conventions: April 2016
State convention: May 7, 2016
National delegates: 50

South Carolina Republican primary, February 20, 2016
Candidate	Votes	Percentage	Actual delegate count		
Candidate	Votes	Percentage	Bound	Unbound	Total
Donald Trump	240,882	32.51%	50	0	50
Marco Rubio	166,565	22.48%	0	0	0
Ted Cruz	165,417	22.33%	0	0	0
Jeb Bush	58,056	7.84%	0	0	0
John Kasich	56,410	7.61%	0	0	0
Ben Carson	53,551	7.23%	0	0	0
Chris Christie (withdrawn)			0	0	0
Carly Fiorina (withdrawn)			0	0	0
Rand Paul (withdrawn)			0	0	0
Mike Huckabee (withdrawn)			0	0	0
Rick Santorum (withdrawn)			0	0	0
Jim Gilmore (withdrawn)			0	0	0
George Pataki (withdrawn)			0	0	0
Lindsey Graham (withdrawn)			0	0	0
Unprojected delegates:			0	0	0
Total:	740,881	100.00%	50	0	50
Source: The Green Papers

=== Results by County ===
2016 Republican Presidential Primaries in South Carolina (By County)
County	Donald Trump		Marco Rubio		Ted Cruz		Jeb Bush		John Kasich		Ben Carson		All Other Candidates		Total
County	#	%	#	%	#	%	#	%	#	%	#	%	#	%	Total
Abbeville	1,358	36.81%	741	20.09%	878	23.80%	236	6.40%	158	4.28%	308	8.35%	10	0.27%	3,689
Aiken	9,163	31.39%	6,895	23.62%	7,142	24.47%	1,238	4.24%	1,957	6.70%	2,644	9.06%	151	0.52%	29,190
Allendale	160	44.20%	92	25.41%	44	12.15%	21	5.80%	12	3.31%	32	8.84%	1	0.28%	362
Anderson	10,983	31.85%	7,198	20.87%	8,778	25.46%	2,412	6.99%	2,047	5.94%	2,969	8.61%	96	0.28%	34,483
Bamberg	481	39.92%	333	27.63%	193	16.02%	58	4.81%	57	4.73%	78	6.47%	5	0.41%	1,205
Barnwell	1,107	42.58%	575	22.12%	516	19.85%	129	4.96%	91	3.50%	171	6.58%	11	0.42%	2,600
Beaufort	9,960	29.94%	9,165	27.55%	4,419	13.28%	2,198	6.61%	6,263	18.83%	1,100	3.31%	164	0.49%	33,269
Berkeley	9,410	33.86%	6,178	22.23%	6,252	22.49%	2,664	9.59%	1,555	5.59%	1,642	5.91%	92	0.33%	27,793
Calhoun	805	35.03%	421	18.32%	564	24.54%	250	10.88%	110	4.79%	139	6.05%	9	0.39%	2,298
Charleston	14,461	26.28%	15,295	27.79%	9,082	16.50%	6,160	11.19%	7,318	13.30%	2,485	4.52%	236	0.43%	55,037
Cherokee	3,617	41.84%	1,451	16.78%	1,979	22.89%	382	4.42%	309	3.57%	879	10.17%	28	0.32%	8,645
Chester	1,403	41.92%	553	16.52%	844	25.22%	126	3.76%	119	3.56%	284	8.49%	18	0.54%	3,347
Chesterfield	1,824	40.06%	698	15.33%	1,436	31.54%	181	3.98%	145	3.18%	249	5.47%	20	0.44%	4,553
Clarendon	1,622	37.26%	797	18.31%	1,049	24.10%	359	8.25%	245	5.63%	268	6.16%	13	0.30%	4,353
Colleton	2,326	43.14%	936	17.36%	1,104	20.47%	505	9.37%	223	4.14%	281	5.21%	17	0.32%	5,392
Darlington	3,352	37.60%	1,387	15.56%	2,594	29.09%	693	7.77%	328	3.68%	525	5.89%	37	0.41%	8,916
Dillon	972	36.24%	445	16.59%	912	34.00%	169	6.30%	65	2.42%	112	4.18%	7	0.26%	2,682
Dorchester	6,967	31.38%	5,253	23.66%	5,216	23.50%	1,952	8.79%	1,422	6.41%	1,315	5.92%	75	0.34%	22,200
Edgefield	1,366	34.01%	900	22.40%	1,148	28.58%	116	2.89%	151	3.76%	328	8.17%	8	0.20%	4,017
Fairfield	920	35.77%	497	19.32%	632	24.57%	205	7.97%	164	6.38%	145	5.64%	9	0.35%	2,572
Florence	6,023	33.04%	3,369	18.48%	5,218	28.63%	1,463	8.03%	824	4.52%	1,273	6.98%	57	0.31%	18,227
Georgetown	4,627	40.03%	2,695	23.31%	1,594	13.79%	960	8.30%	1,024	8.86%	611	5.29%	49	0.42%	11,560
Greenville	25,044	26.69%	23,037	24.56%	23,026	24.54%	6,568	7.00%	7,719	8.23%	8,080	8.61%	343	0.37%	93,817
Greenwood	3,047	28.61%	2,556	24.00%	2,425	22.77%	873	8.20%	700	6.57%	993	9.32%	56	0.53%	10,650
Hampton	721	43.12%	314	18.78%	365	21.83%	83	4.96%	88	5.26%	92	5.50%	9	0.54%	1,672
Horry	26,684	49.00%	9,699	17.81%	8,579	15.75%	3,189	5.86%	3,462	6.36%	2,662	4.89%	180	0.33%	54,455
Jasper	1,169	38.99%	695	23.18%	568	18.95%	119	3.97%	275	9.17%	157	5.24%	15	0.50%	2,998
Kershaw	3,681	34.25%	1,906	17.74%	2,779	25.86%	1,152	10.72%	581	5.41%	617	5.74%	31	0.29%	10,747
Lancaster	4,207	33.71%	2,766	22.16%	2,698	21.62%	563	4.51%	1,048	8.40%	1,136	9.10%	63	0.50%	12,481
Laurens	3,327	34.29%	1,584	16.32%	2,750	28.34%	767	7.90%	439	4.52%	793	8.17%	43	0.44%	9,703
Lee	744	47.24%	196	12.44%	353	22.41%	152	9.65%	58	3.68%	65	4.13%	7	0.44%	1,575
Lexington	16,392	29.89%	11,440	20.86%	13,190	24.05%	5,307	9.68%	3,451	6.29%	4,854	8.85%	208	0.38%	54,842
Marion	1,212	42.51%	436	15.29%	741	25.99%	215	7.54%	100	3.51%	141	4.95%	6	0.21%	2,851
Marlboro	741	42.10%	254	14.43%	410	23.30%	164	9.32%	57	3.24%	128	7.27%	6	0.34%	1,760
McCormick	616	33.77%	468	25.66%	372	20.39%	76	4.17%	180	9.87%	106	5.81%	6	0.33%	1,824
Newberry	2,046	34.26%	1,156	19.36%	1,267	21.22%	621	10.40%	343	5.74%	523	8.76%	16	0.27%	5,972
Oconee	4,427	28.29%	3,165	20.23%	4,004	25.59%	1,391	8.89%	1,478	9.45%	1,126	7.20%	56	0.36%	15,647
Orangeburg	2,553	37.90%	1,311	19.46%	1,310	19.45%	781	11.59%	354	5.26%	405	6.01%	22	0.33%	6,736
Pickens	7,149	30.04%	4,963	20.85%	6,404	26.91%	2,035	8.55%	1,448	6.08%	1,715	7.21%	84	0.35%	23,798
Richland	9,205	23.28%	10,992	27.80%	7,983	20.19%	4,493	11.36%	4,063	10.27%	2,641	6.68%	169	0.43%	39,546
Saluda	1,248	36.31%	553	16.09%	797	23.19%	382	11.11%	156	4.54%	295	8.58%	6	0.17%	3,437
Spartanburg	15,293	32.62%	10,711	22.85%	11,494	24.52%	2,746	5.86%	2,461	5.25%	4,041	8.62%	134	0.29%	46,880
Sumter	3,764	33.57%	2,236	19.94%	2,477	22.09%	1,353	12.07%	532	4.74%	818	7.29%	34	0.30%	11,214
Union	1,403	38.75%	752	20.77%	885	24.44%	269	7.43%	114	3.15%	189	5.22%	9	0.25%	3,621
Williamsburg	1,187	43.10%	521	18.92%	575	20.88%	230	8.35%	76	2.76%	152	5.52%	13	0.47%	2,754
York	12,115	31.63%	8,141	21.26%	9,210	24.05%	2,050	5.35%	2,640	6.89%	3,984	10.40%	157	0.41%	38,297
Totals	240,882	32.39%	166,565	22.40%	165,417	22.24%	58,056	7.81%	56,410	7.59%	53,551	7.20%	2,786	0.37%	743,667

== Exit Polls ==
2016 South Carolina Republican Primary by demographic subgroup (Edison exit polling)
Demographic subgroup	Cruz	Trump	Rubio	Kasich	Bush	% of total vote
Total vote	22.3	33.5	22.5	7.6	7.8	93%
Gender
Men	22	36	22	7	7	51%
Women	22	29	23	9	9	49%
Race
White	22	33	22	8	8	96%
Education and Race
White College Graduate	19	25	27	11	9	52%
White Non-college	24	42	17	4	6	45%
Age
17–44 years old	26	26	25	8	4	27%
45+ years old	21	35	22	7	9	73%
Income
$30,000 - $49,999	27	33	20	7	8	17%
$50,000 - $99,999	26	34	19	7	6	37%
$100,000 - $199,999	17	28	28	12	7	26%
Issue regarded as most important
Immigration	25	51	11	3	3	10%
Economy	15	36	24	13	7	29%
Terrorism	25	31	23	5	9	32%
Government spending	25	25	25	8	9	26%
Area type
Urban	18	23	31	12	10	23%
Suburban	26	36	18	5	7	48%
Rural	20	34	22	8	8	29%
Religion
Evangelical	26	34	21	5	7	67%
Non-Evangelical	17	38	22	16	9	33%
Veteran household
Yes	21	35	23	7	8	17%
No	24	31	21	9	8	83%

== Analysis ==
Donald Trump won the South Carolina primary by ten points. He carried the crucial Evangelical vote with 33% to Cruz at 27% and Rubio at 22%. Many pundits were perplexed by Trump's dominance among culturally conservative Southern whites who were expected to view him as immoral, but he benefitted from voters' racial, cultural, and economic angst that mattered more than shared values.

Marco Rubio, who enjoyed the endorsement of Governor Nikki Haley, came in second in the primary. Rubio won the two urban counties of Richland and Charleston, both of which have a higher percentage of college-educated voters.
