= 2026 South Carolina Commissioner of Agriculture election =

- November 3, 2026
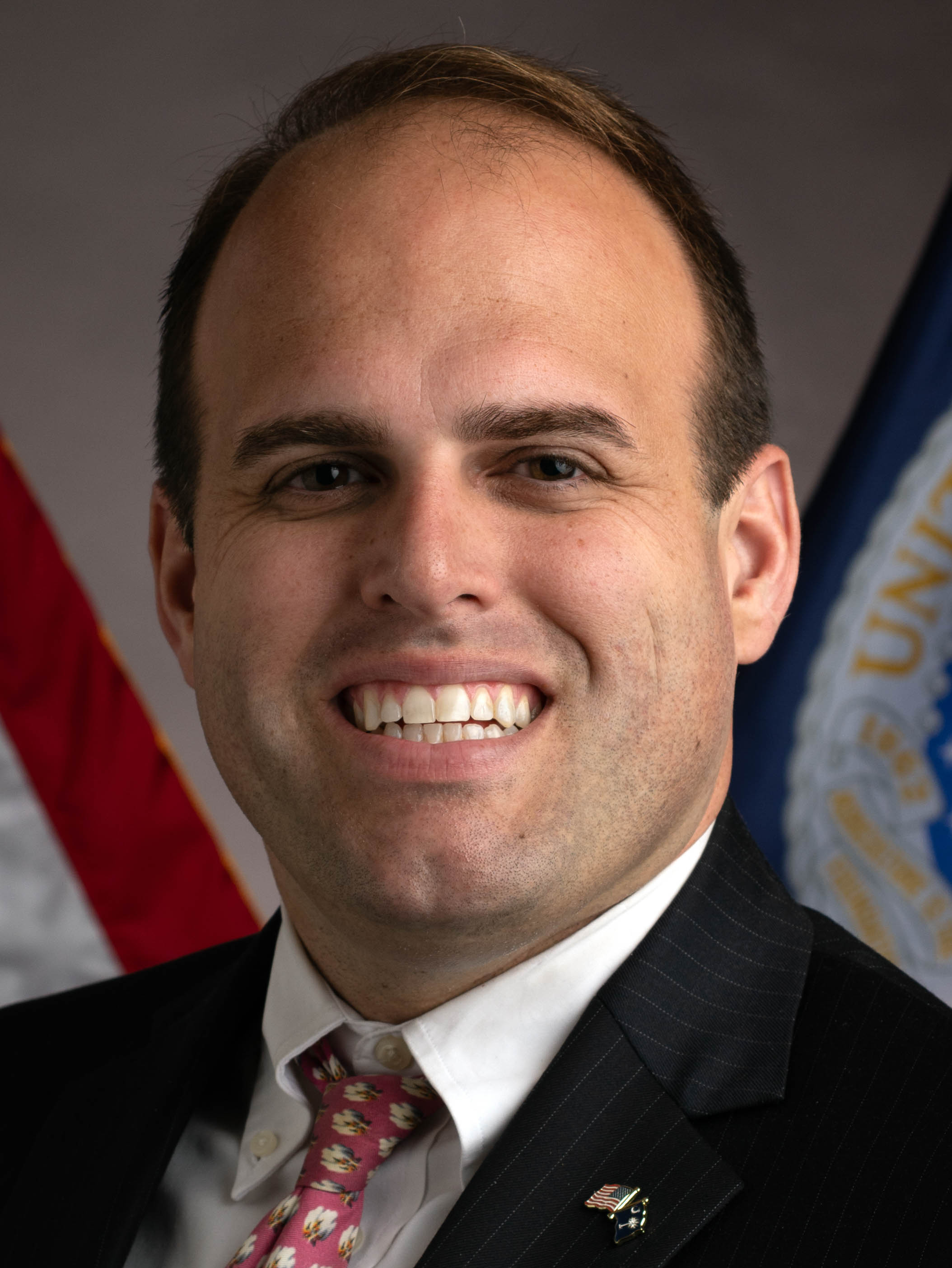

| Candidate | Cody Simpson | DeShawn Blanding |
| Party | Republican | Democratic |
| Popular vote | 1,041,797 | 921,750 |
| Percentage | 51.6% | 45.7% |
- County results Simpson: 40–50% 50–60% 60–70% 70–80% Blanding: 40–50% 50–60% 60–70% 70–80%
Commissioner of Agriculture before election
Hugh Weathers
Republican
Elected Commissioner of Agriculture
Cody Simpson
Republican

The 2026 South Carolina Commissioner of Agriculture election was held on November 3, 2026, to elect the South Carolina Commissioner of Agriculture. Republican Cody Simpson defeated Democrat DeShawn Blanding in the general election.

The primary election was held on June 9. Incumbent Republican commissioner Hugh Weathers was retiring.

== Republican primary ==
=== Candidates ===
==== Nominee ====
- Cody Simpson, former state executive director of the Farm Service Agency (2025–2026)

==== Eliminated to runoff ====
- Danny Ford II, farm owner and son of football coach Danny Ford

==== Eliminated in primary ====
- Jeremy Cannon, business owner and farmer
- Fred West, director of market development at the South Carolina Department of Agriculture

==== Declined ====
- Hugh Weathers, incumbent commissioner

=== Endorsements ===
Cody Simpson

Executive branch officials

- Donald Trump, president of the United States (2017–2021, 2025–present)

Statewide officials

- Henry McMaster, governor of South Carolina (2017–present)
- Pamela Evette, lieutenant governor of South Carolina (2019–present)
Fred West

Statewide officials

- Hugh Weathers, agriculture commissioner of South Carolina (2004–present)

State legislators

- Shane Massey, majority leader of the South Carolina Senate (2016–present) from the 25th district (2007–present)
- Wes Climer, state senator from the 15th district (2016–present)

=== Results ===
Primary results by county: Simpson: 30–40%; 40–50%; 50–60%; Ford: 30–40%; 40–50%; 50–60%

Republican primary
| Party | Candidate | Votes | % |
|---|---|---|---|
| Republican | Cody Simpson | 164,090 | 38.1 |
| Republican | Danny Ford II | 160,274 | 37.3 |
| Republican | Jeremy Cannon | 59,012 | 13.7 |
| Republican | Fred West | 46,857 | 10.9 |
| Total votes | | 430,233 | 100.0 |

=== Runoff ===
==== Results ====
Runoff results by county: Simpson: 50–60%; 60–70%; 70–80%; 80–90%

Republican primary runoff
| Party | Candidate | Votes | % |
|---|---|---|---|
| Republican | Cody Simpson | 193,033 | 62.6 |
| Republican | Danny Ford II | 115,432 | 37.4 |
| Total votes | | 308,465 | 100.0 |

== Democratic primary ==
=== Candidates ===
==== Nominee ====
- DeShawn Blanding, former policy analyst for the U.S. House Committee on Agriculture

== Third parties ==
=== Candidates ===
==== Declared ====
- Chris Nelums (United Citizens)
- Michael Sullens (Libertarian)

== General election ==
=== Polling ===
| Poll source | Date(s) administered | Sample size (Note: Key: A – all adults RV – registered voters LV – likely voters V – unclear) | Margin of error | Cody Simpson (R) | DeShawn Blanding (D) | Other | Undecided |
|---|---|---|---|---|---|---|---|
| Trafalgar Group (R) | October 31 – November 1, 2026 | 1,091 (LV) | ± 2.9% | 51% | 33% | 7% (Note: Michael Sullens (L) with 5%; Chris Nelums (UC) with 2%) | 9% |
| Trafalgar Group (R) | October 16–18, 2026 | 1,095 (LV) | ± 2.9% | 51% | 33% | 7% | 9% |

=== Results ===
2026 South Carolina Commissioner of Agriculture election
| Party | Candidate | Votes | % | ±% |
|---|---|---|---|---|
| Republican | Cody Simpson | 1,042,601 | 51.58% | |
| Democratic | DeShawn Blanding | 922,961 | 45.66% | |
| Libertarian | Michael Sullens | 38,468 | 1.90% | |
| United Citizens | Chris Nelums | 16,030 | 0.79% | |
| Write-in | | 1,137 | 0.06% | |
| Total votes | | 2,021,197 | 100.0 | |
