= Charles Sharpe =

Charles Sharpe may refer to:

- Charles Sharpe (cricketer) (1851–1935), English amateur first-class cricketer
- Charles Sharpe (politician) (born 1938), American politician
- Charles Kirkpatrick Sharpe (1781?–1851), Scottish antiquary and artist
- Charles Richard Sharpe (1889–1963), English recipient of the Victoria Cross

== See also ==
- Charles Sharp (1848–1903), English cricketer
- Charles Stewart Sharp, British businessman in Hong Kong in the early 1900s
