= South Carolina presidential primary =

Selection of presidential candidates

The South Carolina presidential primary is an open primary election which has become one of several key early-state presidential primaries in the process of the Democratic and Republican Parties choosing their respective general election nominees for President of the United States. South Carolina has cemented its place as the "First in the South" primary for both parties.

Historically, this primary election has been much more important in the Republican Party's nomination process, considered a "firewall" that could permanently eliminate any/all serious rivals to the winner. It is meant to force the various factions of the party to decide quickly on and unite behind a single candidate and avoid wasting precious time and resources on a drawn-out battle between their own candidates, that would divert the party's focus from working to defeat the Democrats' likely nominee. Since its 1980 inception, the winner of the Republican South Carolina primary has always become the eventual Republican National Convention nominee for that fall's general election, with one exception, the 2012 primary, in which eventual Republican nominee Mitt Romney finished second, behind winner Newt Gingrich (who would go on to suspend his campaign before that summer's convention began).

South Carolina has also been important for the Democrats. In 2008, the Democratic South Carolina primary took on added significance because it was the first nominating contest in that cycle in which a large percentage (55 percent, according to an exit poll) of primary voters were African Americans. In 2020, it was also described as a "firewall" for Joe Biden, where he had considerable leverage over his opponents, particularity with African American voters.

== Democratic results ==
- 1988 (caucus) (March 12): Jesse Jackson (55%), Al Gore (17%), Michael Dukakis (6%), Dick Gephardt (2%), and others (0%)
- 1992 (March 7): Bill Clinton (63%), Paul Tsongas (18%), Tom Harkin (7%), Jerry Brown (6%), uncommitted (3%), and others (2%)
- 1996: Primary cancelled
- 2000 (March 9): Al Gore (92%) and Bill Bradley (2%)
- 2004 (February 3): John Edwards (45%), John Kerry (30%), Al Sharpton (10%), Wesley Clark (7%), Howard Dean (5%), and Joe Lieberman (2%)
- 2008 (January 26): Barack Obama (55%), Hillary Clinton (27%), and John Edwards (18%)
- 2012 (January 28): Barack Obama (unopposed)
- 2016 (February 27): Hillary Clinton (73%) and Bernie Sanders (26%)
- 2020 (February 29): Joe Biden (48%), Bernie Sanders (20%), Tom Steyer (11%), Pete Buttigieg (8%), Elizabeth Warren (7%), Amy Klobuchar (3%), and Tulsi Gabbard (1%)
- 2024 (February 3): Joe Biden (96%)

== Republican results ==
- 1980 (March 8): Ronald Reagan (55%), John Connally (30%), George H. W. Bush (15%), and others (0%)
- 1984: Primary canceled
- 1988 (March 5): George H. W. Bush (49%), Bob Dole (21%), Pat Robertson (19%), and Jack Kemp (11%)
- 1992 (March 7): George H. W. Bush (67%), Pat Buchanan (26%), and David Duke (7%)
- 1996 (March 2): Bob Dole (45%), Pat Buchanan (29%), Steve Forbes (13%), Lamar Alexander (10%), and Alan Keyes (2%)
- 2000 (February 19): George W. Bush (53%), John McCain (42%), Alan Keyes (5%), and others (0%)
- 2004: Primary canceled
- 2008 (January 19): John McCain (33%), Mike Huckabee (30%), Fred Thompson (16%), Mitt Romney (15%), Ron Paul (4%), Rudy Giuliani (2%), and others (0%)
- 2012 (January 21): Newt Gingrich (40%), Mitt Romney (28%), Rick Santorum (17%), and Ron Paul (13%)
- 2016 (February 20): Donald Trump (33%), Marco Rubio (22%), Ted Cruz (22%), Jeb Bush (8%), John Kasich (8%), and Ben Carson (7%)
- 2020: Primary canceled
- 2024 (February 24):
