= Mike Huckabee presidential campaign =

Mike Huckabee has unsuccessfully run for president twice:

- Mike Huckabee 2008 presidential campaign
- Mike Huckabee 2016 presidential campaign
