= SCDA =

SCDA could refer to:

- The ICAO airport code for Diego Aracena International Airport, Chile
- The South Carolina Department of Agriculture, government organization
- Tom Clancy's Splinter Cell: Double Agent, a video game
