= Charles Sharpe (cricketer) =

English cricketer

Charles Molesworth Sharpe (6 September 1851 – 25 June 1935) was an English amateur first-class cricketer, who played seven matches for Cambridge University, one game for Yorkshire County Cricket Club, and one for the North of England in 1875. He also played for Hertfordshire in 1890. His first-class career was short, and restricted to one year, but his record stands out to this day.

Born in Codicote, Hertfordshire, England, Sharpe was educated at the former St John's Wood School, London, and Jesus College, Cambridge. He was a right arm slow round arm bowler, who took a remarkable seventy wickets in his nine games, at an average of 14.10, as well as it can be determined as one scorecard, against the Rest of England, is incomplete. His best analysis, of 7 for 43 came against Surrey, and he took five wickets in an innings nine times and ten wickets in a match four times. He scored 129 runs at 14.33, with a best of 29 against Oxford University in the Varsity Match, and he held ten catches. Oddly, his sole appearance for Yorkshire yielded fifteen runs, but no wickets.

He was vicar of Elsecar Parish Church near Barnsley, Yorkshire for a number of years, and also played cricket with notable success for the Elsecar village team. Jim Beachill published the detailed 150 Year History of Elsecar Cricket Club 1854–2004, in which Charles Sharpe is recorded as having played during the period from 1889 to 1895.

Sharpe died in June 1935, in Ilkley, Yorkshire.
