= Charles Sharpe (politician) =

American politician

11th South Carolina Commissioner of Agriculture
- In office January 12, 2002 – July 29, 2004
- Preceded by: D. Leslie Tindal
- Succeeded by: Hugh Weathers

Member of the South Carolina House of Representatives from the 86th district
- In office 1985–2002

Personal details
- Born: September 6, 1938 (age 87)
- Party: Republican
- Spouse: Linda Karen Garvin
- Children: four
- Occupation: publisher

Charles Ray Sharpe (born September 6, 1938) is a former American politician in the state of South Carolina. He served in the South Carolina House of Representatives as a member of the Republican Party from 1985 to 2002, representing Aiken County. He resides in Wagener. He was a magazine publisher. Sharpe also served as South Carolina Agriculture Commissioner from 2002 to 2004. He resigned in 2004 after being indicted on charges of extortion, money laundering and lying to federal investigators, stemming from an illegal cockfighting ring. He served two years in prison.

Party political offices
Preceded by D. Leslie Tindal	Republican nominee for Agriculture Commissioner of South Carolina; 2002	Succeeded by Hugh Weathers
