= Mike Ryhal =

American politician

Member of the South Carolina House of Representatives from the 56th district
- In office 2012–2018
- Succeeded by: Tim McGinnis

Personal details
- Born: October 1, 1957 (age 68) Sharon, Pennsylvania, United States
- Party: Republican

Mike Ryhal (born October 1, 1957) is an American politician. He is a former member of the South Carolina House of Representatives from the 56th District, serving from 2012 to 2018. He is a member of the Republican party.
