= 2016 South Carolina Democratic presidential primary =

- February 27, 2016

59 Democratic National Convention delegates (53 pledged, 6 unpledged)

| Candidate | Hillary Clinton | Bernie Sanders |
| Home state | New York | Vermont |
| Delegate count | 39 | 14 |
| Popular vote | 272,379 | 96,498 |
| Percentage | 73.44% | 26.02% |
- County results Clinton: 50–60% 60–70% 70–80% 80–90% >90%

The 2016 South Carolina Democratic presidential primary took place on February 27 in the U.S. state of South Carolina, marking the Democratic Party's fourth nominating contest in their series of presidential primaries ahead of the 2016 presidential election.

Clinton won the South Carolina Democratic primary by a landslide margin of more than 47%, receiving a larger percentage of the African American vote than Obama, the first black President, did in 2008.

With the Republican Party having already held its South Carolina primary a week earlier on February 20, the Democratic primary in South Carolina was the only presidential primary on that day.

== Debates and forums ==
=== November 2015 forum in Rock Hill ===
Rachel Maddow was selected to moderate the First in the South Candidates Forum with Hillary Clinton, Bernie Sanders, and Martin O'Malley, which was held at Winthrop University in Rock Hill, South Carolina, on November 6, co-sponsored by the Democratic Parties of 13 southern states. The forum was not in debate format; instead, each candidate was interviewed individually and sequentially. Lincoln Chafee and Jim Webb were also invited, but their campaigns never responded to the invitations, and both have since withdrawn from the race. A Public Policy Poll of South Carolina Democratic voters conducted from November 7–8, after the forum, discovered that 67% of viewers thought Clinton won the forum, 16% thought Sanders won, and 6% thought O'Malley won, with 11% unsure.

=== January 2016 debate in Charleston, South Carolina ===
On January 17, 2016, the Democratic Party held a fourth debate at the Gaillard Center in Charleston, South Carolina. Hosted by Lester Holt and Andrea Mitchell, the debate aired on NBC News and was streamed on YouTube. It was also sponsored by the Congressional Black Caucus. It was notable as being the final debate before the start of precinct caucuses and primary voting. Participants were Hillary Clinton, Bernie Sanders, and Martin O'Malley. It was the final debate appearance of O'Malley, who suspended his campaign on February 1.

Both before and after the debate, commentators said the debate was focused on Sanders and his voting record on gun control and slights against President Obama, among other issues. During the debate, O'Malley interrupted to take 30 seconds to talk about "homeland security and preparedness". Also during the debate, Clinton and Sanders had some back-and-forth exchanges to define themselves on Wall Street, foreign policy, and gun control.

== Opinion polling ==
Delegate count: 53 Pledged, 6 Unpledged

Winner: Hillary Clinton
Primary date: 27 February 2016

| Poll source | Date | 1st | 2nd | 3rd | Other |
|---|---|---|---|---|---|
| Official Primary results | February 27, 2016 | Hillary Clinton; 73.4% | Bernie Sanders; 26.0% | | Others; 0.6% |
| Clemson Margin of error: 3.0% Sample size: 650 | February 20–25, 2016 | Hillary Clinton; 64% | Bernie Sanders; 14% | | Others / Undecided; 22% |
| Emerson College Margin of error: 6.0% Sample size: 266 | February 22–24, 2016 | Hillary Clinton; 60% | Bernie Sanders; 37% | | Others / Undecided; 3% |
| NBC/WSJ/Marist Margin of error: 4.8% Sample size: 425 | February 15–17, 2016 | Hillary Clinton; 60% | Bernie Sanders; 32% | | Other; 8% |
| Bloomberg Politics Margin of error: 4.9% Sample size: 403 | February 13–17, 2016 | Hillary Clinton; 53% | Bernie Sanders; 31% | | Not sure 16% |
| ARG Margin of error: 5% Sample size: 400 | February 14–16, 2016 | Hillary Clinton; 61% | Bernie Sanders; 31% | Someone else 1% | No opinion 7% |
| Public Policy Polling Margin of error: ± 4% Sample size: 525 | February 14–15, 2016 | Hillary Clinton; 55% | Bernie Sanders; 34% | | Undecided 12% |
| CNN/ORC Margin of error: 6% Sample size: 289 | February 10–15, 2016 | Hillary Clinton; 56% | Bernie Sanders; 38% | Someone else 3% | No opinion 4% |
| ARG Margin of error: ± 5.0% Sample size: 400 | February 12–13, 2016 | Hillary Clinton; 65% | Bernie Sanders; 27% | | Other 1%, Undecided 7% |
| YouGov/CBS News Margin of error: ± 8.7% Sample size: 404 | February 10–12, 2016 | Hillary Clinton; 59% | Bernie Sanders; 40% | | No Preference 1% |
| NBC/WSJ/Marist Margin of error: ± 4.6% Sample size: 446 | January 17–23, 2016 | Hillary Clinton; 64% | Bernie Sanders; 27% | Martin O'Malley; 2% | Undecided 7% |
| YouGov/CBS News Margin of error: ± 9.4% Sample size: 388 | January 17–21, 2016 | Hillary Clinton; 60% | Bernie Sanders; 38% | Martin O'Malley; 0% | Undecided 2% |
| SC New Democrats Margin of error: ± ?% Sample size: 583 | January 12–15, 2016 | Hillary Clinton; 47% | Bernie Sanders; 28% | Martin O'Malley; 2% | Undecided 22% |

Polls in 2015

| Poll source | Date | 1st | 2nd | 3rd | Other |
|---|---|---|---|---|---|
| YouGov/CBS News Margin of error: ± 5.0% Sample size: 420 | December 13–17, 2015 | Hillary Clinton; 67% | Bernie Sanders; 31% | Martin O'Malley; 2% | No Preference 0% |
| Fox News Margin of error: ± 5.0% Sample size: 364 | December 5–8, 2015 | Hillary Clinton; 65% | Bernie Sanders; 21% | Martin O'Malley; 3% | Other 1%, None of the Above 7%, DK 3% |
| YouGov/CBS News Margin of error: ± 6.0% Sample size: 420 | November 15–19, 2015 | Hillary Clinton; 72% | Bernie Sanders; 25% | Martin O'Malley; 2% | Undecided 1% |
| Public Policy Polling Margin of error: ± 4.9% Sample size: 400 | November 7–8, 2015 | Hillary Clinton; 72% | Bernie Sanders; 18% | Martin O'Malley; 5% | Unsure 5% |
| Monmouth University Margin of error: ± 4.9% Sample size: 400 | November 5–8, 2015 | Hillary Clinton; 69% | Bernie Sanders; 21% | Martin O'Malley; 1% | Other 1% No Preference 8% |
| Winthrop University Margin of error: ± 3.4% Sample size: 832 | October 24 – November 1, 2015 | Hillary Clinton; 71% | Bernie Sanders; 15% | Martin O'Malley; 2% | Refused 2% Undecided 9% Wouldn't Vote 1% |
| YouGov/CBS News Margin of error: ± 8.2% Sample size: 427 | October 15–22, 2015 | Hillary Clinton; 68% | Bernie Sanders; 25% | Martin O'Malley; 1% | Jim Webb 1%, Lincoln Chafee 0%, Lawrence Lessig 0%, No preference 4% |
| Clemson Palmetto Margin of error: 4.0% Sample size: 600 | October 13–23, 2015 | Hillary Clinton; 43% | Bernie Sanders; 6% | Martin O'Malley; 1% | Undecided 50% |
| CNN/ORC Margin of error: 5.5% Sample size: 301 | October 3–10, 2015 | Hillary Clinton; 49% | Joe Biden; 24% | Bernie Sanders; 18% | Martin O'Malley 3%, Someone else 1%, None/No one 1%, No opinion 4% |
| Gravis Marketing Margin of error: ± ?% Sample size: ? | September 25–27, 2015 | Hillary Clinton; 50% | Joe Biden; 19% | Bernie Sanders; 13% | Lincoln Chafee 1%, Jim Webb <1%, Martin O'Malley <1%, Unsure 17% |
| YouGov/CBS News Margin of error: ± 6.8% Sample size: 528 | Sep. 3–10, 2015 | Hillary Clinton; 46% | Bernie Sanders; 23% | Joe Biden; 22% | No preference 8%, Jim Webb 1%, Lincoln Chafee 0%, Martin O'Malley 0% |
| Public Policy Polling Margin of error: ± 5.6% Sample size: 302 | Sep. 3–6, 2015 | Hillary Clinton; 54% | Joe Biden; 24% | Bernie Sanders; 9% | Martin O’Malley, Jim Webb 2%; Lincoln Chafee 1% |
| Gravis Marketing Margin of error: ± 4.0% Sample size: 209 | July 29–30, 2015 | Hillary Clinton; 78% | Bernie Sanders; 8% | Elizabeth Warren; 6% | Joe Biden 6%, Jim Webb 1%, Martin O'Malley 1%, Lincoln Chafee 1% |
| Morning Consult Margin of error: ? Sample size: 309 | May 31 – June 8, 2015 | Hillary Clinton; 56% | Joe Biden; 15% | Bernie Sanders; 10% | Martin O'Malley 3%, Jim Webb 2%, Lincoln Chafee 1%, Someone else 2% Undecided 11% |
| Public Policy Polling Margin of error: ± 6.2% Sample size: 252 | February 12–15, 2015 | Hillary Clinton; 59% | Joe Biden; 18% | Elizabeth Warren; 10% | Martin O'Malley 3%, Bernie Sanders 1%, Jim Webb 1%, Other/Undecided 8% |
| NBC News/Marist Margin of error: ± 5.2% Sample size: 352 | February 3–10, 2015 | Hillary Clinton; 65% | Joe Biden; 20% | Bernie Sanders; 3% | Martin O'Malley 2%, Jim Webb 2%, Undecided 8% |

Polls in 2014

| Poll source | Date | 1st | 2nd | 3rd | Other |
|---|---|---|---|---|---|
| Clemson University Margin of error: ±6% Sample size: 400 | May 26 – June 2, 2014 | Hillary Clinton; 50% | Joe Biden; 12% | Andrew Cuomo; 2% | Martin O'Malley 1%, Deval Patrick 0%, Brian Schweitzer 0%, Undecided/Don't know 35% |

== Results ==
South Carolina Democratic primary, February 27, 2016
| Candidate | Popular vote | | Estimated delegates | | |
| Candidate | Count | Percentage | Pledged | Unpledged | Total |
|---|---|---|---|---|---|
| Hillary Clinton | 272,379 | 73.44% | 39 | 5 | 44 |
| Bernie Sanders | 96,498 | 26.02% | 14 | 0 | 14 |
| Willie Wilson | 1,314 | 0.35% | | | |
| Martin O'Malley (withdrawn) | 713 | 0.19% | | | |
| Uncommitted | | | 0 | 1 | 1 |
| Total votes | 370,904 | 100% | 53 | 6 | 59 |

=== Results by county ===
Clinton won every county.

| County | Clinton | % | Sanders | % | Others | Total votes cast | Turnout as % of total registered electors | Margin as % of votes cast in primary |
|---|---|---|---|---|---|---|---|---|
| Abbeville | 1,508 | 81.91% | 312 | 16.95% | 21 | 1,841 | 12.45% | 64.96% |
| Aiken | 6,889 | 70.17% | 2,877 | 29.31% | 51 | 9,883 | 9.41% | 40.87% |
| Allendale | 1,022 | 90.84% | 95 | 8.44% | 8 | 1,137 | 19.43% | 82.40% |
| Anderson | 5,576 | 66.79% | 2,712 | 32.48% | 61 | 8,401 | 7.54% | 34.30% |
| Bamberg | 1,710 | 89.20% | 197 | 10.28% | 10 | 1,928 | 20.08% | 78.93% |
| Barnwell | 1,561 | 87.45% | 209 | 11.71% | 15 | 1,800 | 13.50% | 75.74% |
| Beaufort | 9,970 | 73.30% | 3,575 | 26.28% | 56 | 13,664 | 13.21% | 47.02% |
| Berkeley | 9,485 | 71.96% | 3,592 | 27.25% | 104 | 13,264 | 12.04% | 44.71% |
| Calhoun | 1,536 | 86.05% | 241 | 13.50% | 8 | 1,809 | 17.31% | 72.55% |
| Charleston | 26,625 | 65.97% | 13,527 | 33.47% | 228 | 40,508 | 15.34% | 32.50% |
| Cherokee | 1,877 | 77.95% | 514 | 21.35% | 17 | 2,427 | 7.91% | 56.60% |
| Chester | 1,962 | 79.63% | 492 | 19.97% | 10 | 2,477 | 12.23% | 59.66% |
| Chesterfield | 2,209 | 82.80% | 446 | 16.72% | 13 | 2,696 | 10.71% | 66.08% |
| Clarendon | 3,571 | 90.87% | 337 | 8.58% | 22 | 3,976 | 17.17% | 82.29% |
| Colleton | 2,939 | 81.86% | 584 | 16.40% | 37 | 3,592 | 14.89% | 66.15% |
| Darlington | 4,990 | 81.86% | 1,081 | 17.73% | 25 | 6,148 | 14.49% | 64.12% |
| Dillon | 1,659 | 84.00% | 302 | 15.29% | 14 | 1,993 | 10.33% | 68.71% |
| Dorchester | 6,934 | 70.21% | 2,885 | 29.21% | 57 | 9,929 | 10.54% | 41.00% |
| Edgefield | 1,474 | 81.80% | 301 | 16.70% | 27 | 1,822 | 11.46% | 65.09% |
| Fairfield | 3,265 | 87.46% | 440 | 11.76% | 28 | 3,754 | 24.35% | 75.68% |
| Florence | 9,433 | 78.00% | 2,594 | 21.45% | 67 | 12,196 | 14.53% | 55.55% |
| Georgetown | 4,941 | 77.82% | 1,350 | 21.26% | 58 | 6,402 | 15.69% | 56.56% |
| Greenville | 19,966 | 63.95% | 11,118 | 35.61% | 138 | 31,398 | 10.56% | 28.34% |
| Greenwood | 3,623 | 77.46% | 987 | 21.10% | 67 | 4,710 | 11.82% | 56.36% |
| Hampton | 1,933 | 87.98% | 241 | 10.97% | 23 | 2,202 | 17.27% | 77.01% |
| Horry | 11,316 | 67.25% | 5,457 | 32.43% | 54 | 16,916 | 8.95% | 34.82% |
| Jasper | 2,195 | 85.08% | 355 | 13.76% | 30 | 2,594 | 15.48% | 71.32% |
| Kershaw | 3,761 | 77.10% | 1,093 | 22.41% | 24 | 4,914 | 12.32% | 54.69% |
| Lancaster | 3,346 | 72.96% | 1,221 | 26.62% | 19 | 4,615 | 8.98% | 46.34% |
| Laurens | 2,978 | 78.53% | 801 | 21.12% | 13 | 3,831 | 10.25% | 57.41% |
| Lee | 2,209 | 87.66% | 288 | 11.43% | 23 | 2,548 | 21.40% | 76.23% |
| Lexington | 8,847 | 60.93% | 5,611 | 38.65% | 61 | 14,572 | 8.69% | 22.29% |
| Marion | 3,361 | 85.37% | 552 | 14.05% | 23 | 3,978 | 18.42% | 71.32% |
| Marlboro | 2,137 | 88.97% | 253 | 10.53% | 12 | 2,412 | 13.60% | 78.43% |
| McCormick | 973 | 85.05% | 162 | 14.16% | 9 | 1,161 | 17.18% | 70.89% |
| Newberry | 2,121 | 80.92% | 471 | 17.97% | 29 | 2,641 | 11.77% | 62.95% |
| Oconee | 1,960 | 59.61% | 1,304 | 39.66% | 24 | 3,305 | 6.93% | 19.95% |
| Orangeburg | 11,872 | 88.64% | 1,473 | 11.00% | 49 | 13,515 | 23.74% | 77.64% |
| Pickens | 2,503 | 55.43% | 1,995 | 44.18% | 18 | 4,528 | 6.90% | 11.25% |
| Richland | 39,332 | 75.75% | 12,354 | 23.79% | 238 | 52,136 | 21.73% | 51.96% |
| Saluda | 1,023 | 83.72% | 192 | 15.71% | 7 | 1,237 | 10.97% | 68.00% |
| Spartanburg | 10,674 | 70.27% | 4,467 | 29.41% | 49 | 1,237 | 9.17% | 40.86% |
| Sumter | 9,830 | 86.61% | 1,443 | 12.71% | 77 | 15,239 | 17.42% | 73.89% |
| Union | 1,690 | 83.37% | 332 | 16.38% | 5 | 11,432 | 11.99% | 67.00% |
| Williamsburg | 4,613 | 88.52% | 557 | 10.69% | 41 | 5,272 | 23.90% | 77.84% |
| York | 8,890 | 63.40% | 5,127 | 36.20% | 57 | 14,216 | 9.26% | 27.20% |
| Total | 272,379 | 73.44% | 96,498 | 26.02% | 2,027 | 373,063 | 12.60% | 47.42% |

Delegates

== Analysis ==
As South Carolina's majority-black Democratic electorate had dealt a severe death-blow to Clinton's 2008 presidential effort against Barack Obama, it gave her campaign new life in 2016. Clinton won the primary in a 47-point routing thanks to ardent support from African American voters. According to exit polls, Clinton won the black vote 86–14, which comprised 61% of the Democratic electorate in South Carolina; she won among black women 89-11 who comprised 37% of the electorate. Clinton's near-unanimous support from black voters was fueled by their interest in a continuation of President Obama's policies, and by black women who wanted to see a woman elected.

Clinton won every county statewide. She won in upcountry 66–34, Piedmont 74–25, Central South Carolina, including the region which is majority African American 78–22, Pee dee/Waccamaw 83–17, and lowcountry 70–30. She also swept the major cities of Charleston, Columbia, Greenville, and Rock Hill.
