= Greg Delleney =

American politician

Rep Greg Delleney Jr.

Member of the South Carolina House of Representatives from the 43rd district
- Incumbent
- Assumed office 1991

Personal details
- Born: February 9, 1952 (age 74) Chester, South Carolina, United States
- Party: Republican (since 2001) Democratic (until 2001)
- Profession: Lawyer

Francis Gregory Delleney Jr. (born February 9, 1952) is an American politician. He is a member of the South Carolina House of Representatives from the 43rd District, serving since 1991. He was first elected as a Democrat, but became a Republican in July 2001.
