= Hugh Weathers =

American politician

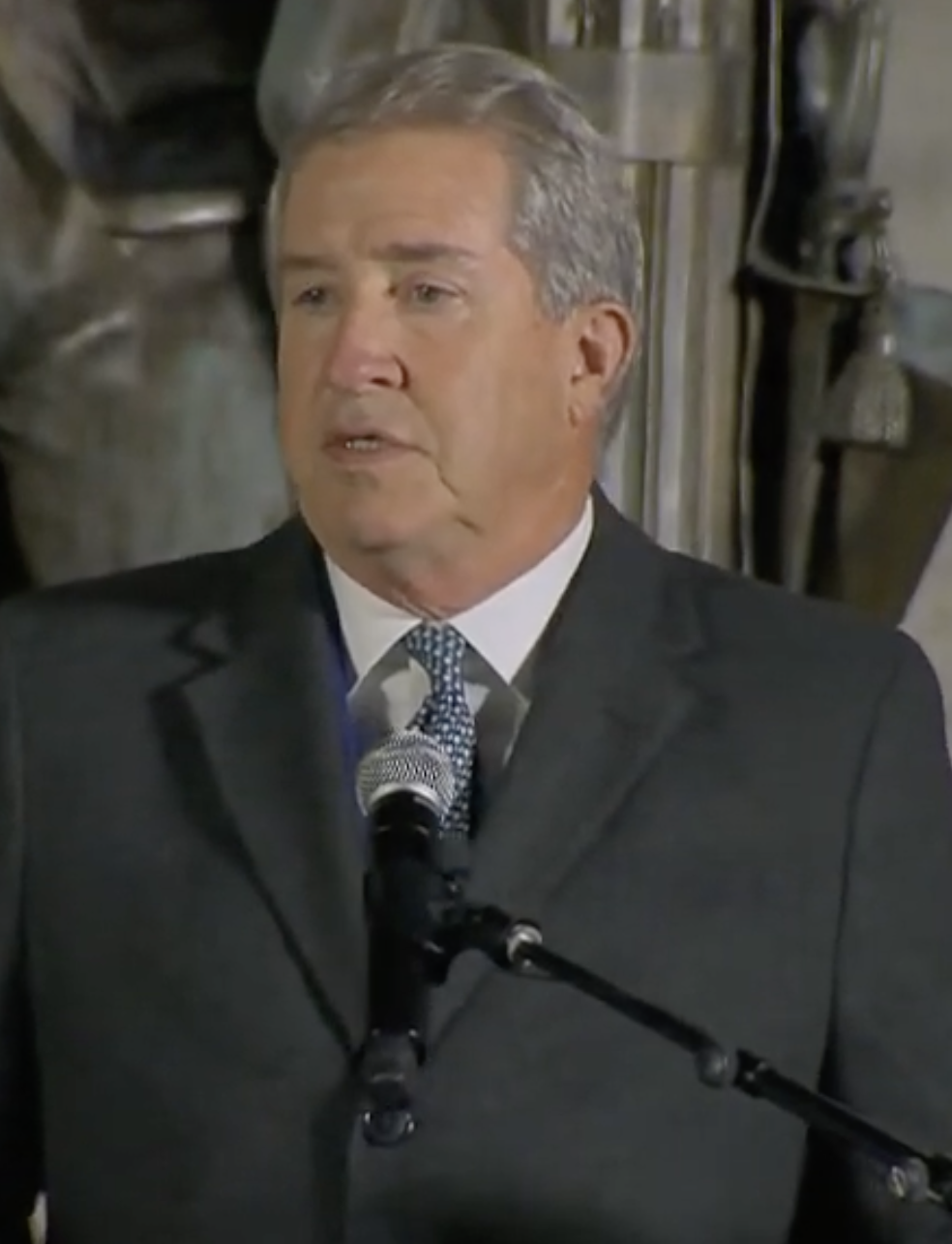

Agriculture Commissioner of South Carolina
- Incumbent
- Assumed office September 14, 2004
- Governor: Mark Sanford; Nikki Haley; Henry McMaster
- Preceded by: Charles Sharpe

Personal details
- Born: June 27, 1956 (age 70) Bowman, South Carolina, U.S.
- Party: Republican
- Spouse: Blanche Weathers
- Children: 3
- Education: University of South Carolina (BS)

Hugh Weathers is an American politician from South Carolina. He serves as South Carolina's Commissioner of Agriculture. He has held the position since September 14, 2004. Weathers is a member of the Republican Party.

== Early life and career ==
Weathers was born on June 27, 1956, in Bowman, South Carolina, where he grew up on Weathers Farms, a 2,000-acre (810 ha) dairy farm. He graduated from Bowman Academy as its valedictorian. He earned his bachelor's degree in accounting and finance from the University of South Carolina in 1978, and was a member of Phi Beta Kappa.

Weathers joined the family dairy business in 1980. He and his brother, Landry, inherited the farm.

== Commissioner of Agriculture ==
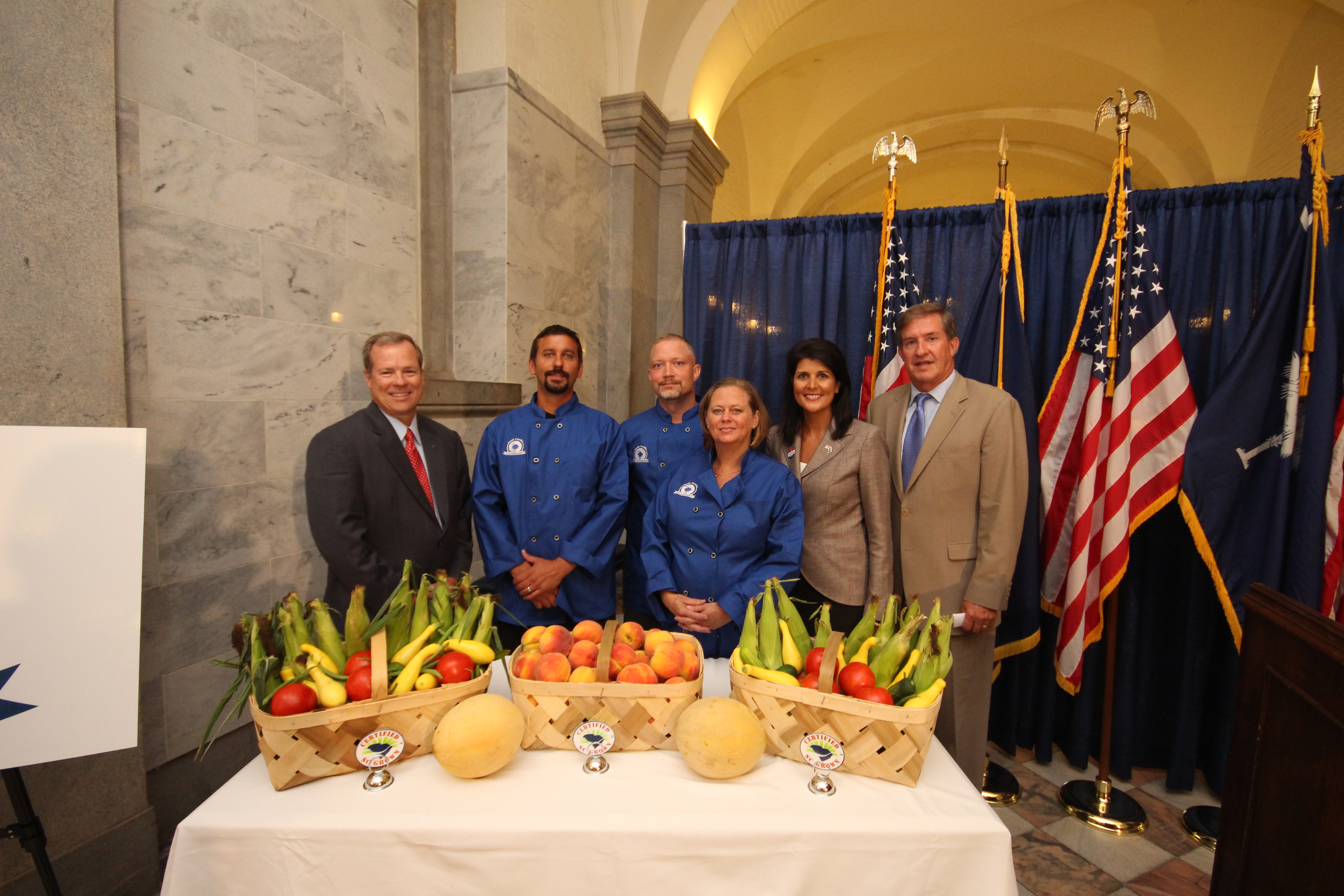
Governor Nikki Haley and Hugh Weathers (right)

Weathers was appointed by Governor Mark Sanford on September 14, 2004, to be the commissioner of agriculture after the incumbent commissioner, Charles Sharpe, had been accused of illegal cockfighting, lying to investigators, extortion, and money laundering. Weathers won the following election in 2006. (Note: While some sources describe Weathers as interim commissioner between his appointment on September 14, 2004 and swearing in for a full term on January 10, 2007 after his first election victory, Section 46-3-40 of the South Carolina Code of Laws declares that any person the governor appoints to the vacant office is the next commissioner of agriculture.)

As commissioner of agriculture, Weathers sought to expand consumers' access and reliance on local produce. In 2006, Weathers oversaw the creation of the branding "Certified SC Grown" to highlight produce grown in South Carolina. Weathers also advocated to increase the economic impact of the department to $50 billion by 2020.

Weathers won reelection in the 2022 general election with 77.6% of the vote, defeating Green Party candidate David Edmond. Weathers indicated that this will be his final term in office.

== Electoral history ==
2006 South Carolina Commissioner of Agriculture Republican primary
Party	Candidate	Votes	%
Republican	Hugh Weathers (incumbent)	131,061	57.4%
Republican	William Bell	97,326	42.6%
Total votes		228,387	100.0%

2006 South Carolina Commissioner of Agriculture election
Party	Candidate	Votes	%
Republican	Hugh Weathers (incumbent)	635,903	59.7%
Democratic	Emile DeFelice	429,255	40.3%
Write-in		318	0.03%
Total votes		1,065,476	100.0%

2010 South Carolina Commissioner of Agriculture election
Party	Candidate	Votes	%
Republican	Hugh Weathers (incumbent)	792,260	60.1%
Democratic	Tom E. Elliott	525,229	39.8%
Write-in		533	0.04%
Total votes		1,318,022	100.0%

2014 South Carolina Commissioner of Agriculture Republican primary
Party	Candidate	Votes	%
Republican	Hugh Weathers (incumbent)	184,621	65.1%
Republican	Joe Farmer	99,155	34.9%
Total votes		283,776	100.0%

2014 South Carolina Commissioner of Agriculture election
Party	Candidate	Votes	%
Republican	Hugh Weathers (incumbent)	759,640	79.7%
Independent	David Edmond	106,223	11.1%
American	Emile DeFelice	84,831	8.9%
Write-in		2,922	0.31%
Total votes		953,616	100.0%

2018 South Carolina Commissioner of Agriculture election
Party	Candidate	Votes	%
Republican	Hugh Weathers (incumbent)	1,015,366	75.7%
Green	David Edmond	202,238	15.1%
Independent	Chris Nelums	118,671	8.8%
Write-in		5,025	0.37%
Total votes		1,341,300	100.0%

2022 South Carolina Commissioner of Agriculture Republican primary
Party	Candidate	Votes	%
Republican	Hugh Weathers (incumbent)	199,424	59.3%
Republican	Bill Bledsoe	97,711	29.0%
Republican	Bob Rozier	39,391	11.7%
Total votes		336,526	100.0%

South Carolina Agriculture Commissioner Election, 2022
Party	Candidate	Votes	%
Republican	Hugh Weathers (incumbent)	1,085,139	77.6%
Green	David Edmond	213,219	15.3%
United Citizens	Chris Nelums	95,625	6.8%
Write-in		4,409	0.3%
Total votes		1,398,392	100%

== Personal life ==
Weathers is married with three children and is a fourth-generation farmer.

== Notes ==
Political offices
Preceded by Charles Sharpe	Agriculture Commissioner of South Carolina; 2004–present	Incumbent
Party political offices
Preceded by Charles Sharpe	Republican nominee for Agriculture Commissioner of South Carolina; 2006, 2010, 2014, 2018, 2022	Most recent
