= South Carolina Department of Agriculture =

State agency

Department overview
- Formed: 1879
- Headquarters: 1200 Senate Street, 5th Floor, Wade Hampton Building, Columbia, SC 29201
- Annual budget: $30,613,907
- Department executive: Hugh Weathers, Commissioner of Agriculture

The South Carolina Department of Agriculture is a state government agency that oversees and promotes agriculture in the state of South Carolina. It is led by a commissioner of agriculture, a position currently held by Republican Hugh Weathers.

== Responsibilities ==
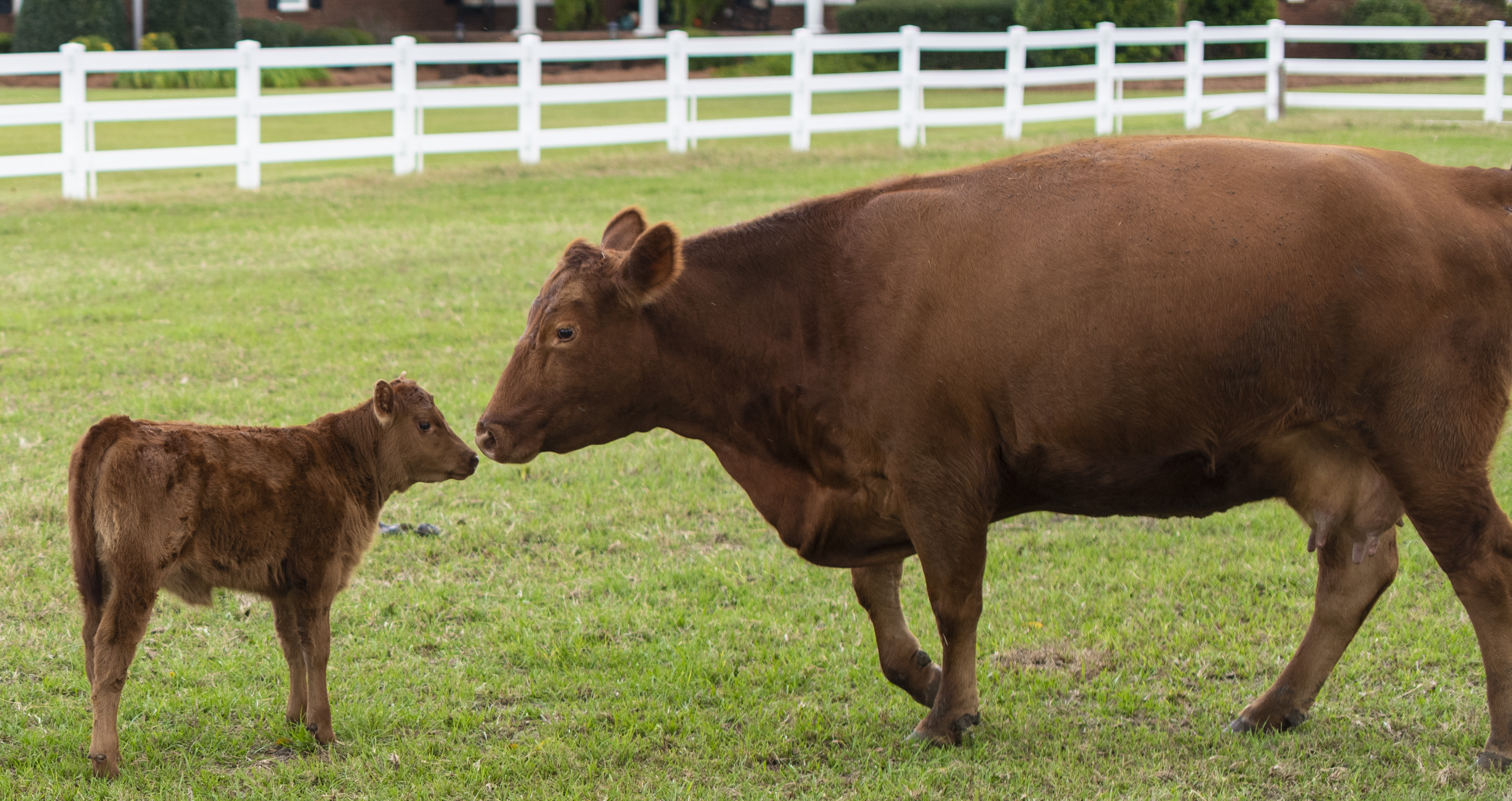
Red Angus Cattle in Orangeburg, South Carolina.

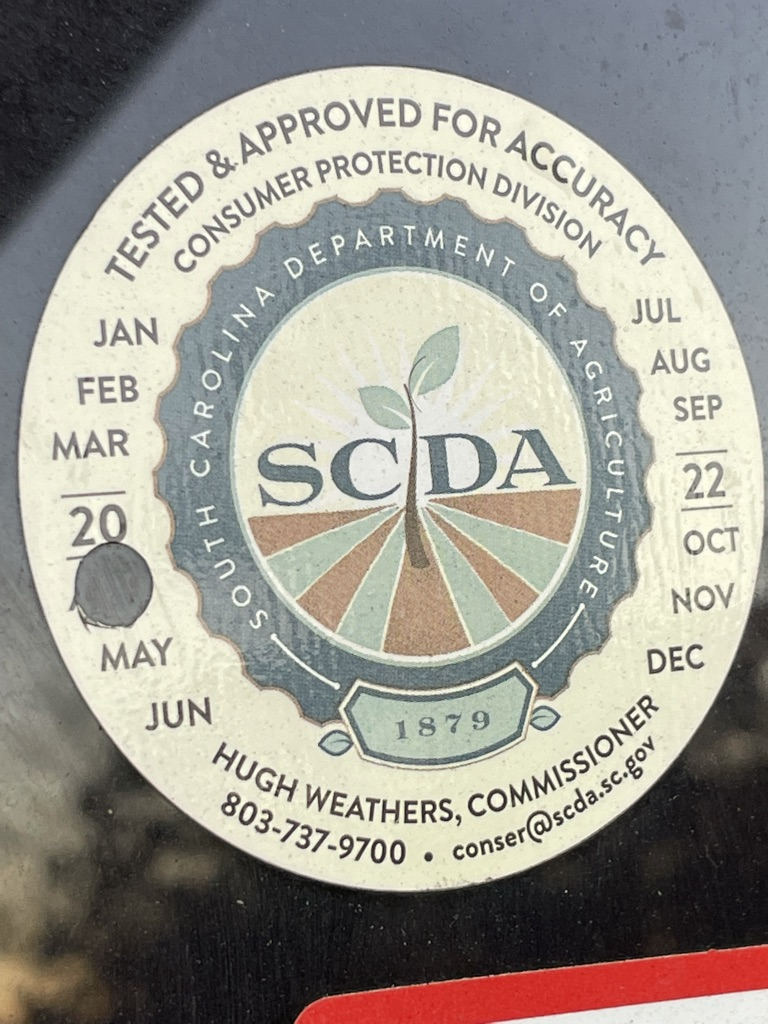
SCDA inspection and certification sticker on fuel pump.

According to South Carolina law, "The Department of Agriculture shall execute the laws of this State pertaining to agriculture." The SCDA is also responsible for leading safety inspections of farms across South Carolina. In order for any business to sell, manufacture, or pack and food in South Carolina, it must receive a manufacturers, processors and packers permit after inspection from the SCDA.

In 2006, the department enacted the phrase "Certified SC Grown," a label which can only be attached to produce grown in South Carolina. The goal is to encourage more consumers to purchase products produced in South Carolina to support local farmers. According to the department's leader, the SCDA is responsible for $50 billion in economic impact. The SCDA also establishes lotteries from grants and loans for low-income farmers.

The SCDA is also responsible for regulating the sale of gasoline in South Carolina. The department is tasked with ensuring that the state's 64,000+ fuel pumps for motor vehicles in addition to airline fuel pumps are functioning correctly, are dispensing safe and balanced gasoline, and do not contain fraud measures, such as credit card skimmers.

== History ==
The Department of Agriculture was founded in 1879 and launched in 1880 to oversee and promote agriculture in South Carolina. After the era of slavery in South Carolina, much of the soil had been depleted by the overproduction of cotton. Because the state lacked statistical data on how to make executive decisions regarding agriculture, the General Assembly created the department of agriculture. The department was established with a broad array of responsibilities: fertilizer regulation, soil improvement and analysis, distribution of seeds, sheep husbandry, immigration, geology, labor, and forestry.

=== Commissioners ===
There have been 12 commissioners of agriculture since 1880.

#	Commissioner	Term of office	Party	Notes
1	A.P. Butler	1880–1890	Democratic	Position appointed by governor
2	Mr. Moore	1880–1881	Democratic	Position appointed by governor
–	Position temporarily abolished			Position appointed by governor
3	Ebbie J. Watson	1904–1917 (died)	Democratic	Position appointed by governor
3	Ebbie J. Watson	1904–1917 (died)	Democratic	Elected at-large in 1916
4	A.C. Summers	1917–1919	Democratic	
5	Bonneau Harris	1919–1925	Democratic	
6	James W. Shealy	1925–1933	Democratic	
7	J. Roy Jones	1933–1957	Democratic	
8	William L. Harrelson	1957–1977	Democratic	
9	G. Bryan Patrick, Jr	1977–1983	Republican	
10	D. Leslie Tindal	1983–2003	Democratic	Switched parties
10	D. Leslie Tindal	1983–2003	Republican	Switched parties
11	Charles R. Sharpe	2003–2005 (resigned)	Republican	Resigned after being indicted on charges of extortion, money laundering and lying to federal investigators
12	Hugh Weathers	2004–present	Republican	Appointed by Governor Mark Sanford to fill vacancy. Began elected term in 2007.
