= Darlington Downtown Historic District =

Historic district in South Carolina, United States

- U.S. National Register of Historic Places
- U.S. Historic district
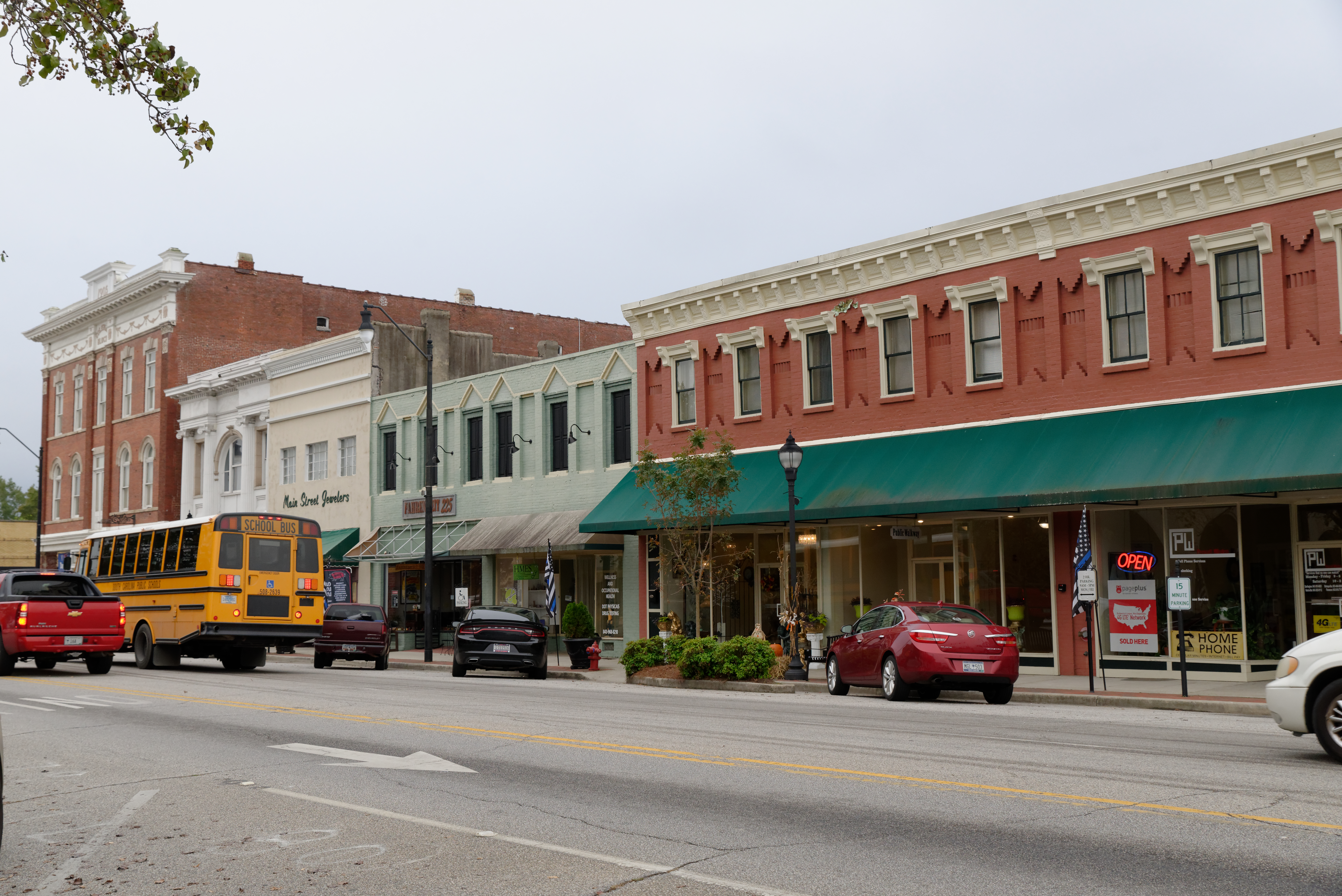

- Location within South Carolina Location within the United States
- Location: Along portions of S. Main St. Pearl St., Public Sq. and Exchange St., Darlington, South Carolina
- Coordinates: 34°18′10″N 79°52′17″W
- Area: 9.9 acres (4.0 ha)
- Architectural style: Late Victorian
- MPS: City of Darlington MRA
- NRHP reference No.: 06000546
- Added to NRHP: July 5, 2006

Darlington Downtown Historic District is a national historic district located at Darlington, Darlington County, South Carolina. The district encompasses 21 contributing commercial buildings in the central business district of Darlington, and built between about 1870 and 1935. The one, two, and three-part commercial buildings exhibit typical turn-of-the-20th century building styles, with brick detailing and, in some cases, cast-iron storefronts. Notable buildings include the Hill Building, Coggeshall Building, McLellan's Dept. Store, Wolfram Building, Jewel's Deluxe Cafe, Coleman Building, Manne Building, "The Darlington News" Building, and Bank of Darlington.

It was listed on the National Register of Historic Places in 2006.
