= Hudson House =

Hudson House may refer to:

- Hudson-Jones House, Arkadelphia, Arkansas, listed on the National Register of Historic Places (NRHP)
- Hudson House (Pine Bluff, Arkansas), NRHP-listed
- Hudson-Grace-Borreson House, Pine Bluff, Arkansas, NRHP-listed
- Morrow-Hudson House, Tempe, Arizona, listed on the NRHP in Maricopa County, Arizona
- Alfred L. Hudson House, Kenton, Delaware, NRHP-listed
- Hudson-Nash House and Cemetery, Lilburn, Georgia, listed on the NRHP in Gwinnett County, Georgia
- Hudson House (Walton, Kentucky), listed on the NRHP in Boone County, Kentucky
- Hudson House (Oxford, Massachusetts), NRHP-listed
- Hudson-Evans House, Detroit, Michigan, NRHP-listed
- Hudson House (Albuquerque, New Mexico), listed on the NRHP in Bernalillo County, New Mexico
- Robert A. Hudson, also known as Hudson House Inc., a former produce packaging and sales company based in Portland, Oregon
- Nelson Hudson House, Darlington, South Carolina, NRHP-listed
- Dr. Taylor Hudson House, Belton, Texas, listed on the NRHP in Bell County, Texas
