= Dove Dale =

Historic house in South Carolina, United States

- U.S. National Register of Historic Places
- Nearest city: Darlington, South Carolina
- Area: 16 acres (6.5 ha)
- Built: c. 1805
- Architectural style: Greek Revival
- NRHP reference No.: 07000075
- Added to NRHP: February 22, 2007

Dove Dale, also known as the Archibald Dove House, Daniel Dove House, and Grover Bryant House, is a historic plantation house near Darlington, Darlington County, South Carolina. The original section dates to about 1805, with later 19th- and early 20th-century alterations. It is a 1½-story frame double-pile, spraddle-roofed house. The house features a front porch with six wood piers. A contributing small fish pond is an early landscape feature of the front lawn. Surrounding the house are agricultural fields that have continued under cultivation for over 200 years.

It was listed on the National Register of Historic Places in 2007.
