= Cashua Street–Spring Street Historic District =

Historic district in South Carolina, United States

- U.S. National Register of Historic Places
- U.S. Historic district
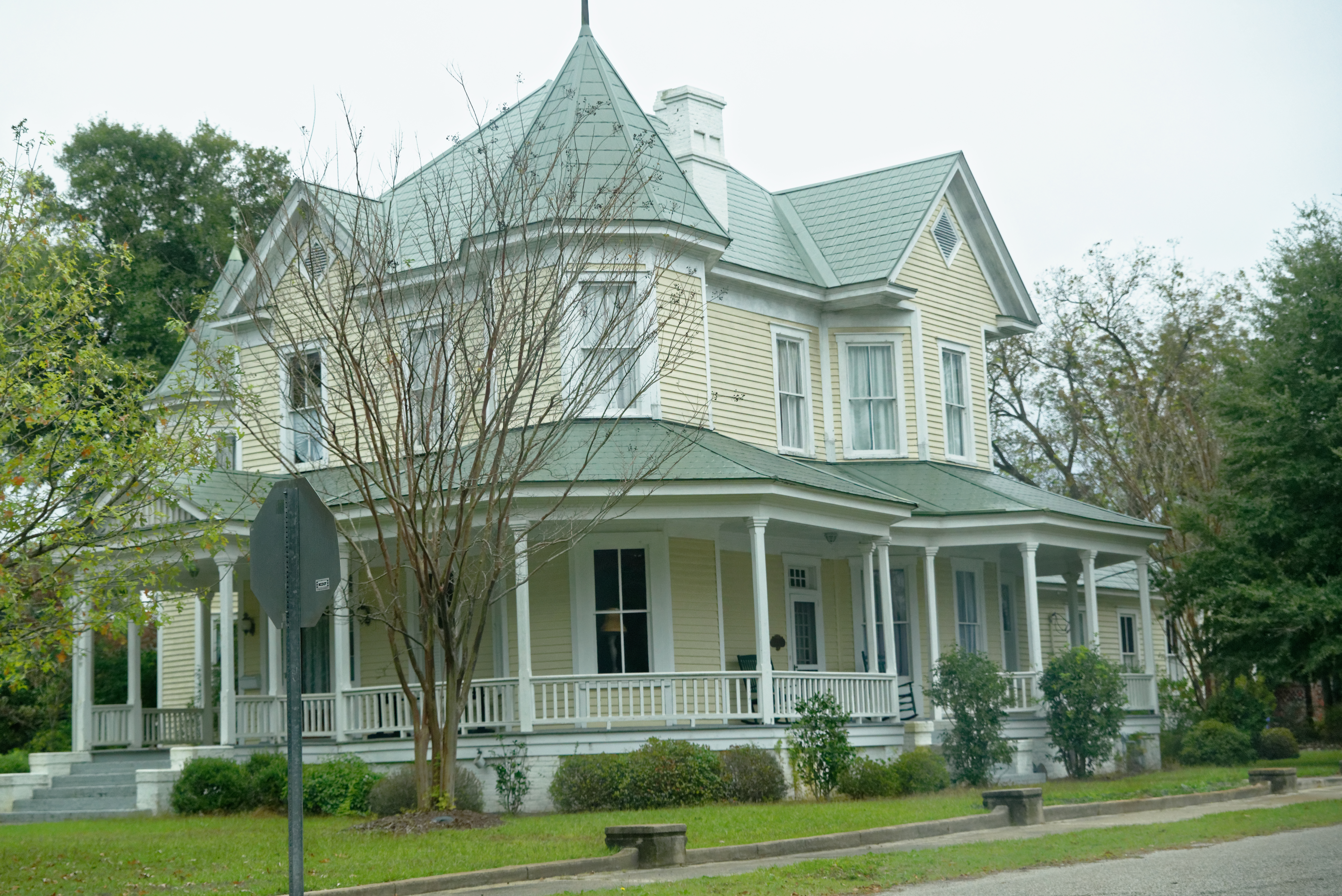

- Location within South Carolina Location within the United States
- Location: Cashua St. between Columbian St. and Warley St., and Spring St. between Cashua St. and N. Ervin St., Darlington, South Carolina
- Coordinates: 34°18′25″N 79°52′01″W
- Area: 28 acres (11 ha)
- Built: c. 1890-1930
- Architect: Multiple
- Architectural style: Bungalow/craftsman, Queen Anne
- MPS: City of Darlington MRA
- NRHP reference No.: 88000064
- Added to NRHP: February 10, 1988

Cashua Street–Spring Street Historic District is a national historic district located at Darlington, Darlington County, South Carolina. The district encompasses 39 contributing buildings in a residential section of Darlington. The district includes a significant collection of intact residences constructed between about 1890 and 1930. Many of the homes were owned by prominent Darlington citizens. The residences along Cashua Street are large, two-story frame dwellings while the residences along Spring Street are smaller, one-story frame houses. Most of the residences have decorative woodwork and are significant examples of the builder's art. Architectural styles include Victorian, Queen Anne, Colonial Revival, and Bungalow. The buildings are situated on large lots that are planted with trees and shrubs.

It was listed on the National Register of Historic Places in 1988.
