= Mrs. B.F. Williamson House =

Historic house in South Carolina, United States

- Mrs. B. F. Williamson House
- U.S. National Register of Historic Places
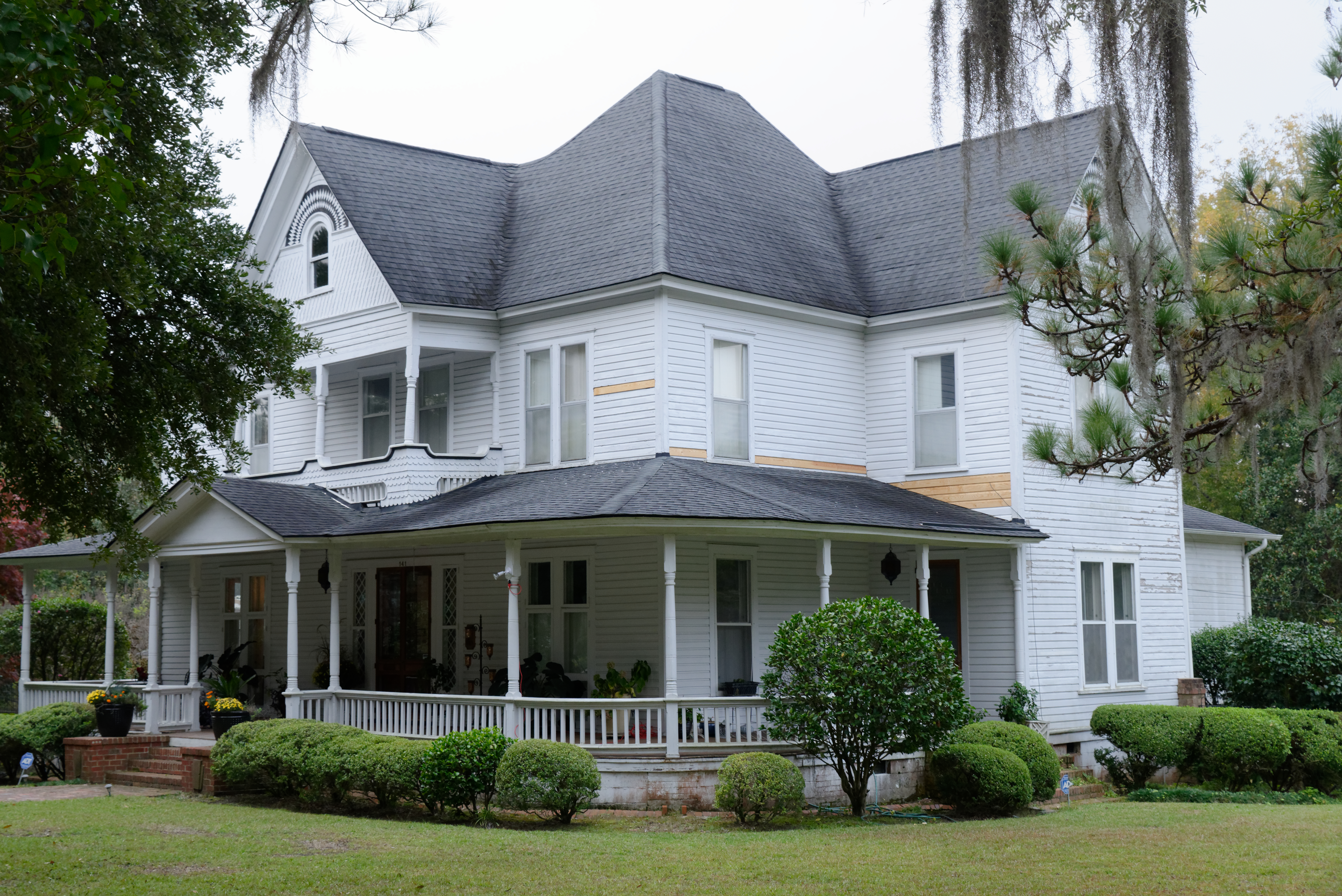

- Location within South Carolina Location within the United States
- Location: 141 Oak St., Darlington, South Carolina
- Coordinates: 34°18′24″N 79°52′17″W
- Area: 1.3 acres (0.53 ha)
- Built: c. 1898
- Architectural style: Queen Anne
- MPS: City of Darlington MRA
- NRHP reference No.: 88000059
- Added to NRHP: February 10, 1988

Mrs. B. F. Williamson House, also known as the Williamson-Wilson House, is a historic home located at Darlington, Darlington County, South Carolina. It was built about 1898, and is a two-story, frame Queen Anne style dwelling. It has shiplap siding, a high complex roof, and tall interior chimneys. It features a wraparound porch with hip roof and turned posts. Also on the property is an original servant's cottage.

It was listed on the National Register of Historic Places in 1988.
