= W. W. Hicks =

W. W. Hicks may refer to:

- William Watkin Hicks (1837–?), Florida politician and Methodist minister
- William Wesley Hicks (1843–1925), Louisiana state representative from 1900 to 1904
