= St. John's Historic District =

Historic district in South Carolina, United States

- U.S. National Register of Historic Places
- U.S. Historic district
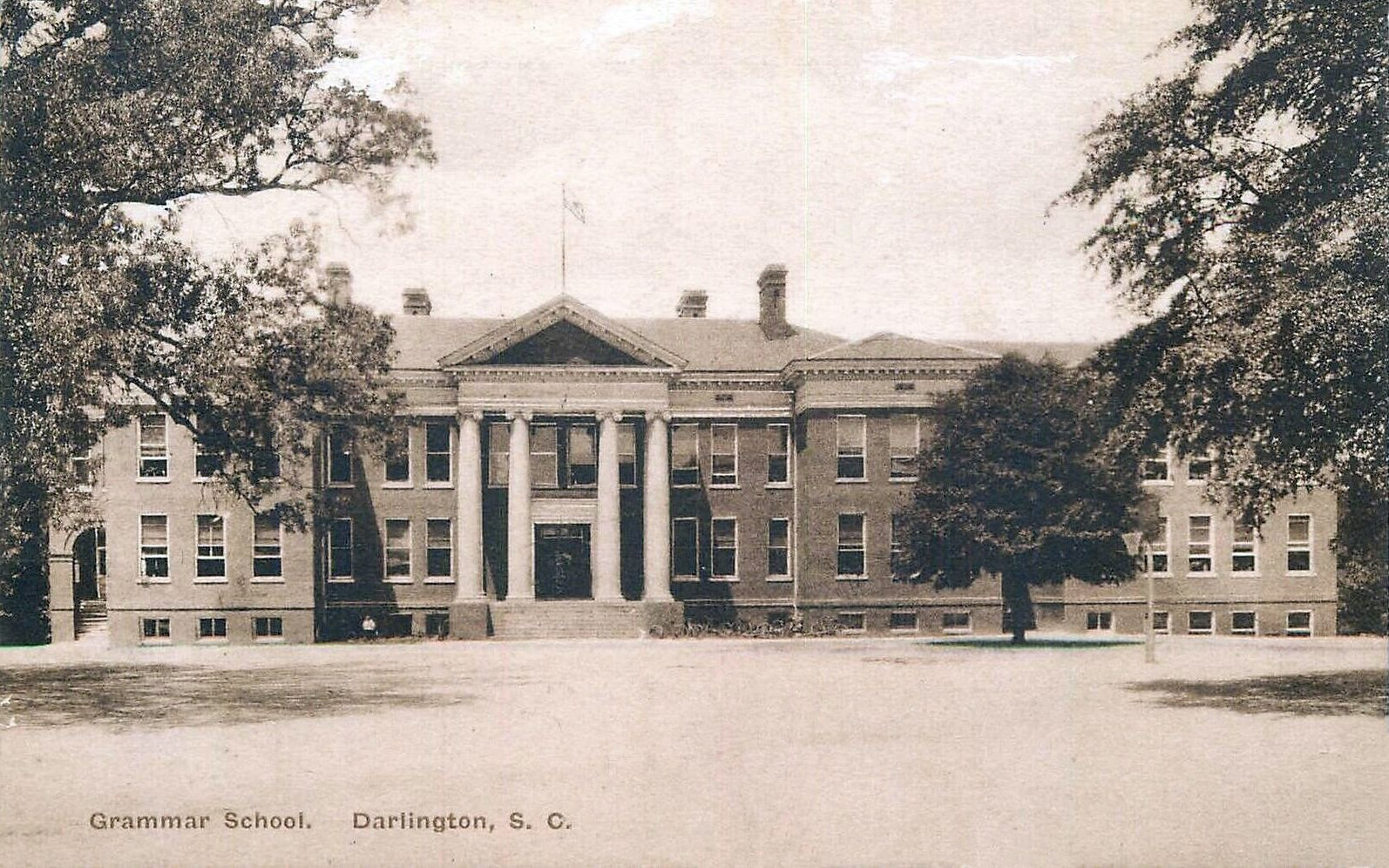
- 'Grammar School' circa 1920, now the St. John's Elementary School on Park Street

- Location within South Carolina Location within the United States
- Location: Park, St. John's Sanders and Orange Sts., Darlington, South Carolina
- Coordinates: 34°18′15″N 79°52′32″W
- Area: 42.8 acres (17.3 ha)
- Built: 1925
- Architectural style: Colonial Revival, Bungalow/craftsman, Queen Anne
- NRHP reference No.: 80003668
- Added to NRHP: September 4, 1980

St. John's Historic District is a national historic district located at Darlington, Darlington County, South Carolina. The district encompasses 55 contributing buildings and 1 contributing site in a mixed residential section of Darlington. The focal point of the district is St. John's School complex and campus, the Academy Green. The properties in the district are located in approximately five block area of oak lined streets. Approximately 75 percent of the buildings were constructed prior to 1925. Most of them were built between 1880 and 1925 during a period of unprecedented agricultural prosperity and reflect the architectural characteristics of that era, including Queen Anne, Neo-Classical, Colonial Revival, and Bungalow. Notable buildings include Central Baptist Church, Darlington County Library, St. John's High School, St. John's Elementary School, Open-Air Theatre, Haynesworth House, L. S. Welling House, and Trinity Methodist Episcopal Church.

It was listed on the National Register of Historic Places in 1980.
