= Clarence McCall House =

Historic house in South Carolina, United States

- U.S. National Register of Historic Places
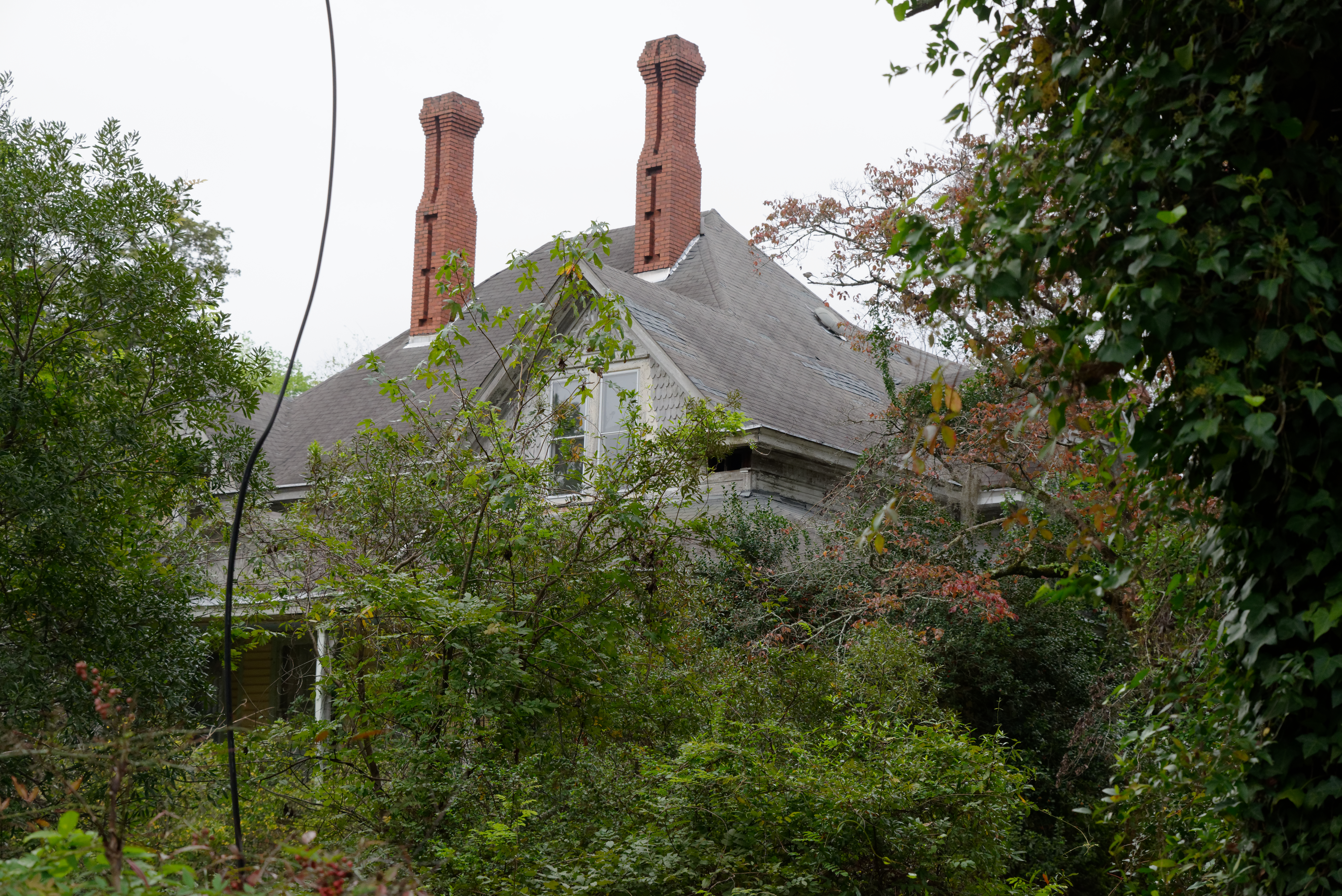

- Location within South Carolina Location within the United States
- Location: 870 Cashua St., Darlington, South Carolina
- Coordinates: 34°18′34″N 79°51′46″W
- Area: 1 acre (0.40 ha)
- Built: c. 1904
- Architectural style: Queen Anne
- MPS: City of Darlington MRA
- NRHP reference No.: 88000058
- Added to NRHP: February 10, 1988

Clarence McCall House, also known as the Harrison House, is a historic home located at Darlington, Darlington County, South Carolina. It was built about 1904, and is a 1 1/2-story, frame Queen Anne style house. It has shiplap siding, a high brick foundation, and a high hipped roof. Also on the property is a small original barn with a gable roof and weatherboard siding.

It was listed on the National Register of Historic Places in 1988.
