= Dovesville, South Carolina =

- Census-designated place
- Location within South Carolina Location within the United States
- Coordinates: 34°23′40″N 79°53′25″W
- Country: United States
- State: South Carolina
- County: Darlington

Area
  - Total: 7.03 sq mi (18.20 km^{2})
  - Land: 7.01 sq mi (18.15 km^{2})
  - Water: 0.019 sq mi (0.05 km^{2})
- Elevation: 171 ft (52 m)

Population (2020)
  - Total: 827
  - Density: 118.0/sq mi (45.56/km^{2})
- Time zone: UTC-5 (Eastern (EST))
  - Summer (DST): UTC-4 (EDT)
- ZIP Code: 29540 (Darlington)
- Area codes: 843/854
- FIPS code: 45-20365
- GNIS feature ID: 2812947

Dovesville is an unincorporated community and census-designated place (CDP) in Darlington County, South Carolina, United States. It was first listed as a CDP prior to the 2020 census. Per the 2020 census, the population was 827.

The CDP is in northeastern Darlington County, along U.S. Routes 52 and 401. The concurrent highway leads north 8 miles (13 km) to Society Hill and south the same distance to Darlington, the county seat.

The southwest border of the CDP follows Black Creek, a southeast-flowing tributary of the Great Pee Dee River, while the eastern border follows Horse Creek, a south-flowing tributary of Black Creek. Jeffords Millpond is an impoundment on Horse Creek in the northeast corner of the community.

== Demographics ==
Historical population
Census	Pop.	Note	%±
2020	827		—
U.S. Decennial Census; 2020

Dovesville first appeared as a census designated place in the 2020 U.S. census.

=== 2020 census ===
Dovesville CDP, South Carolina – Racial and Ethnic Composition (NH = Non-Hispanic) Note: the US Census treats Hispanic/Latino as an ethnic category. This table excludes Latinos from the racial categories and assigns them to a separate category. Hispanics/Latinos may be of any race.
Race / Ethnicity	Pop 2020	% 2020
White alone (NH)	304	36.76%
Black or African American alone (NH)	498	60.22%
Native American or Alaska Native alone (NH)	1	0.12%
Asian alone (NH)	0	0.00%
Pacific Islander alone (NH)	0	0.00%
Some Other Race alone (NH)	1	0.12%
Mixed Race/Multi-Racial (NH)	20	2.42%
Hispanic or Latino (any race)	3	0.36%
Total	827	100.00%
