= Oaklyn Plantation =

- U.S. National Register of Historic Places
- U.S. Historic district
- Location within South Carolina Location within the United States
- Location: Junction of S. Charleston Rd. (South Carolina Highway 35) and Pocket Rd. (South Carolina Highway 173), near Darlington, South Carolina
- Coordinates: 34°16′46″N 79°46′52″W
- Area: 2,584 acres (1,046 ha)
- Built: 1830s
- Architectural style: Classical Revival, Gothic Revival, Federal
- NRHP reference No.: 94001630
- Added to NRHP: February 2, 1995

Oaklyn Plantation is a historic plantation and national historic district located near Darlington, Darlington County, South Carolina. The district encompasses 40 contributing buildings, 6 contributing sites, 2 contributing structures, and contributing object. Founded as a forced-labor farm worked by black people enslaved by the land's white owners, it was one of the major plantation establishments of the county and served as the seat of the Williamson family for more than 200 years.

The property contains a 19th-century Federal-style plantation house (c. 1830s) with early 20th-century alterations, an avenue of oaks, and a flower garden; related domestic service buildings, including a brick kitchen, smokehouse, privy, garage, and servants’ house; various 19th-century and early-20th century agricultural buildings including tobacco curing barns, tobacco packhouses, livestock barns, vehicle and equipment sheds, an engine-powered grist mill, a sawmill, a planer, a 19th-century cotton gin, and a drive through barn and scales for mixing guano; 19th- and early 20th-century tenant houses; the remains of a 19th-century canal, a marl pit (min), charcoal-making pits, underground drainage lines, open water wells, and a narrow gauge road (tram road); a 19th-century pecan grove and grape arbor; and agricultural fields and pastures.

It was listed on the National Register of Historic Places in 1995.
