= Jeffries Creek =

Watercourse in South Carolina, United States

Coordinates: 34.3020955°N 80.0565855°W

Jeffries Creek is a tributary and protected watershed and old growth swamp of the Great Pee Dee River in South Carolina. Its headwaters begin just south of Hartsville, South Carolina. It flows through Darlington and Florence counties. The principal significance of this body of water is that it is a primary water shed of the area. The creek is a blackwater creek that flows from the upper to lower coastal plain in a southeasterly direction.

Jeffries Creek in winter in the city of Florence, SC

There are several recreational uses of Jeffries Creek. Fishing is commonly seen along the creek, which contains a variety of Sunfish, Warmouth, Large Mouth Bass, Common Sucker, Pike and Gar. Being an old growth swamp, many species of Warblers and Wood Peckers can be spotted

It has an abundance of wildlife such as rabbits, wild ducks, muskrats, beaver, hawks and owls, and numerous species of snakes, such as Nerodia
