= Shongaloo, Louisiana =

- Village
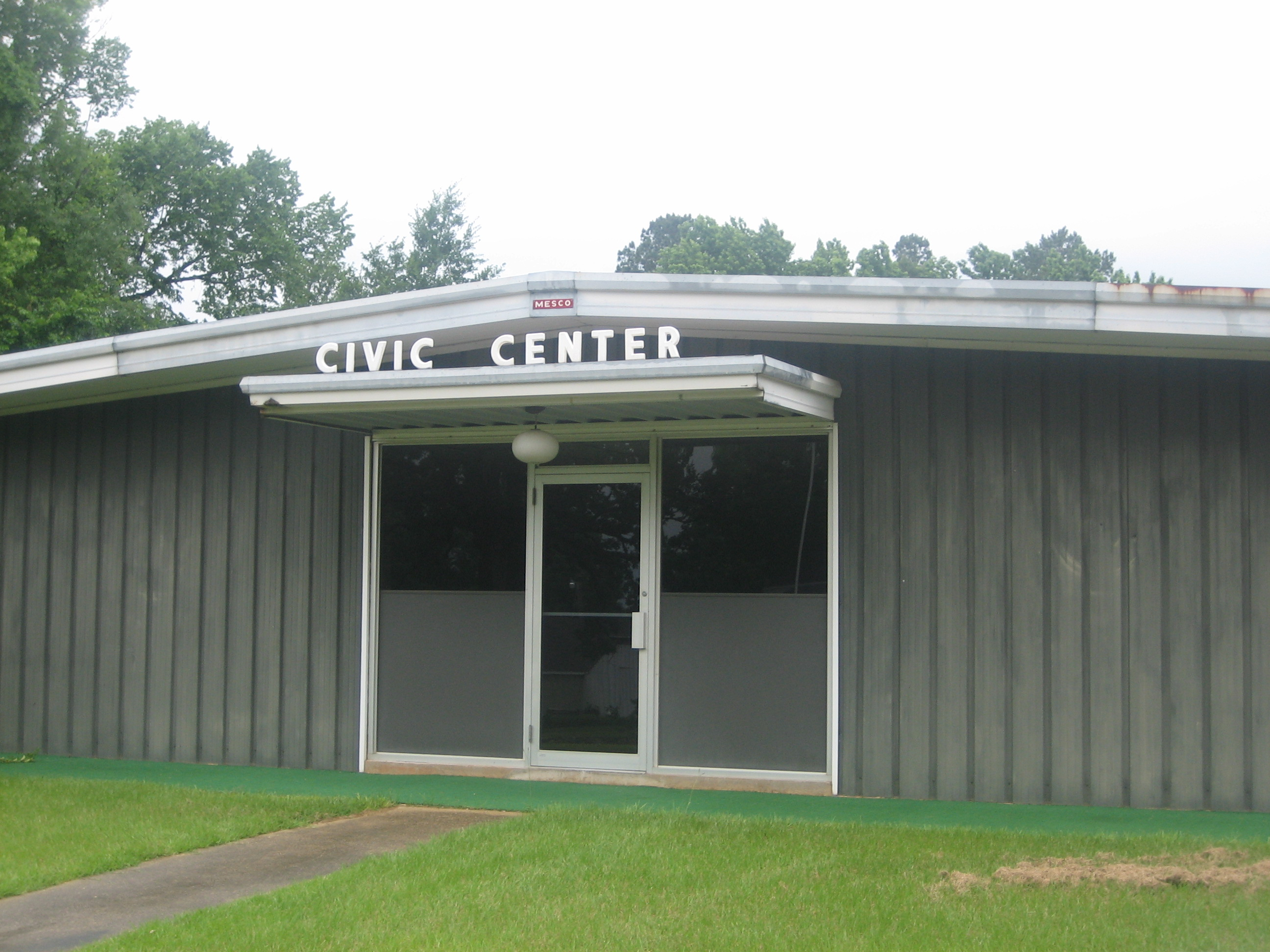
- Shongaloo Civic Center

- Location of Shongaloo in Webster Parish, Louisiana.

- Location of Louisiana in the United States
- Coordinates: 32°56′30″N 93°17′44″W
- Country: United States
- State: Louisiana
- Parish: Webster

Area
  - Total: 7.93 sq mi (20.53 km^{2})
  - Land: 7.90 sq mi (20.45 km^{2})
  - Water: 0.031 sq mi (0.08 km^{2})
- Elevation: 276 ft (84 m)

Population (2020)
  - Total: 151
  - Density: 19.1/sq mi (7.38/km^{2})
- Time zone: UTC-6 (CST)
  - Summer (DST): UTC-5 (CDT)
- Area code: 318
- FIPS code: 22-69455
- GNIS feature ID: 2407544

Shongaloo is a village in Webster Parish, Louisiana, United States. As of the 2020 census, Shongaloo had a population of 151.

Shongaloo has a civic center for town council meetings as well as general usage. There is an adjacent museum with a restored log cabin.

Shongaloo (pronounced Shawn-ga-lew) is an Indian term meaning "Running Water" or "Cypress Tree".

== Geography ==
According to the United States Census Bureau, the village has a total area of 7.9 square miles (20 km^{2}), of which 7.9 square miles (20 km^{2}) is land and 0.04 square miles (0.10 km^{2}) (0.38%) is water.

Dorcheat Bayou, 115 miles (185 kilometers), runs through Shongaloo, making it one of the longest natural bayous in the U.S.

== Demographics ==
Historical population
| Census | Pop. | Note | %± |
|---|---|---|---|
| 1970 | 173 | | — |
| 1980 | 163 | | −5.8% |
| 1990 | 161 | | −1.2% |
| 2000 | 162 | | 0.6% |
| 2010 | 182 | | 12.3% |
| 2020 | 151 | | −17.0% |
| 2025 (est.) | 140 | ▼ | −7.3% |
U.S. Decennial Census

As of the census of 2000, there were 162 people, 65 households, and 47 families residing in the village. The population density was 20.5 inhabitants per square mile (7.9 inhabitants/km^{2}). There were 77 housing units at an average density of 9.7 per square mile (3.7/km^{2}). The racial makeup of the village was 98.15% White, 0.62% Native American, and 1.23% from two or more races. Hispanic or Latino of any race were 0.62% of the population.

There were 65 households, out of which 27.7% had children under the age of 18 living with them, 66.2% were married couples living together, 4.6% had a female householder with no husband present, and 26.2% were non-families. 23.1% of all households were made up of individuals, and 12.3% had someone living alone who was 65 years of age or older. The average household size was 2.49 and the average family size was 2.83.

In the village, the population was spread out, with 21.6% under the age of 18, 5.6% from 18 to 24, 22.8% from 25 to 44, 28.4% from 45 to 64, and 21.6% who were 65 years of age or older. The median age was 45 years. For every 100 females, there were 105.1 males. For every 100 females age 18 and over, there were 104.8 males.

The median income for a household in the village was $41,250, and the median income for a family was $48,750. Males had a median income of $32,500 versus $22,500 for females. The per capita income for the village was $20,809. About 5.0% of families and 10.5% of the population were below the poverty line, including 9.5% of those under the age of eighteen and 18.8% of those sixty-five or over.

== Education ==
North Webster Lower Elementary School, formerly Shongaloo High School before 2011, serves Shongaloo, Sarepta, and Cotton Valley for Pre-K-2nd graders. The school was formed during consolidation which moved Shongaloo 3rd-12th grade students to various schools within Webster Parish.

== Infrastructure ==
Highways include LA 2 and LA 157.

== Notable people ==
- Henry Burns, state representative for District 9 in Bossier Parish
- Talmadge L. Heflin, is a Republican former member of the Texas House of Representatives.
- W. W. Hicks (1843–1925), member of the Louisiana House of Representatives from 1900 to 1904
