= Clyde, South Carolina =

- Unincorporated community
- Location within South Carolina Location within the United States
- Coordinates: 34°23′7″N 80°11′4″W
- Country: United States
- State: South Carolina
- County: Darlington
- Elevation: 233 ft (71 m)
- Time zone: Eastern (EST)
- ZIP code: 29550
- Area codes: 843, 854

Clyde is an unincorporated community in Darlington County, South Carolina, United States. It is elevated at 233 feet and appears on the Lake Robinson Geological Survey Map.
