= Nelson Hudson House =

Historic house in South Carolina, United States

- U.S. National Register of Historic Places
- Location within South Carolina Location within the United States
- Location: 521 Pearl St., Darlington, South Carolina
- Coordinates: 34°17′56″N 79°52′40″W
- Area: less than one acre
- Built: 1830
- Architectural style: Greek Revival
- MPS: City of Darlington MRA
- NRHP reference No.: 88000039
- Added to NRHP: February 10, 1988

Nelson Hudson House, also known as the Hudson-Law-Dargan-Wilson House and Neille Wilson Residence, is a historic home located at Darlington, Darlington County, South Carolina. It was built about 1830 and is a 1 1/2-story, story frame, weatherboarded Greek Revival style house. It features a front pedimented portico. It has a two-story rear wing that was added around 1854. In the back yard is the original clapboard kitchen. According to local tradition Nelson Hudson was a carriage maker who came to Darlington from Marion District and built the house in 1830. Since its listing, the house has moved from original location to unknown site.

It was listed on the National Register of Historic Places in 1988.
