= Manne Building =

Historic building in the US

- U.S. National Register of Historic Places
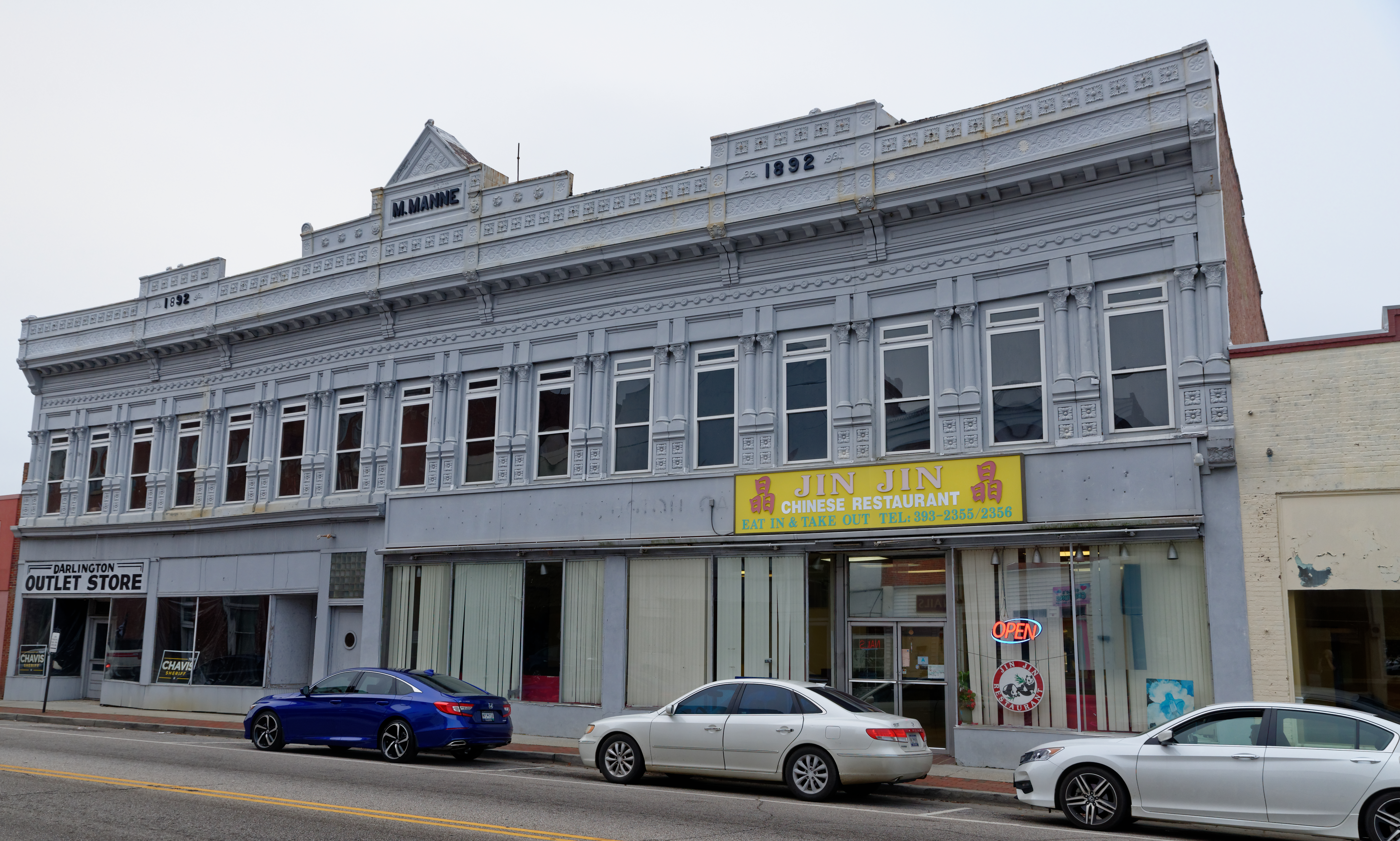

- Location within South Carolina Location within the United States
- Location: 129 Pearl St., Darlington, South Carolina
- Coordinates: 34°18′8″N 79°52′18″W
- Area: less than one acre
- Built: 1892
- MPS: City of Darlington MRA
- NRHP reference No.: 88000044
- Added to NRHP: February 10, 1988

The Manne Building (also known as the M. Manne Building) is a historic commercial building located at Darlington, Darlington County, South Carolina.

== Description and history ==
It was built about 1892, and is a two-story commercial building with a flat roof. It features an elaborate pressed metal façade. The second floor exterior is characterized by 16 windows separated by paired Corinthian order pilasters. Above the second floor windows is pressed metal Eastlake ornamentation and includes a central pediment containing the name "M. Manne" and the date 1892.

It was listed on the National Register of Historic Places on February 10, 1988.
