= First Baptist Church (Darlington, South Carolina) =

Historic church in South Carolina, United States

- U.S. National Register of Historic Places
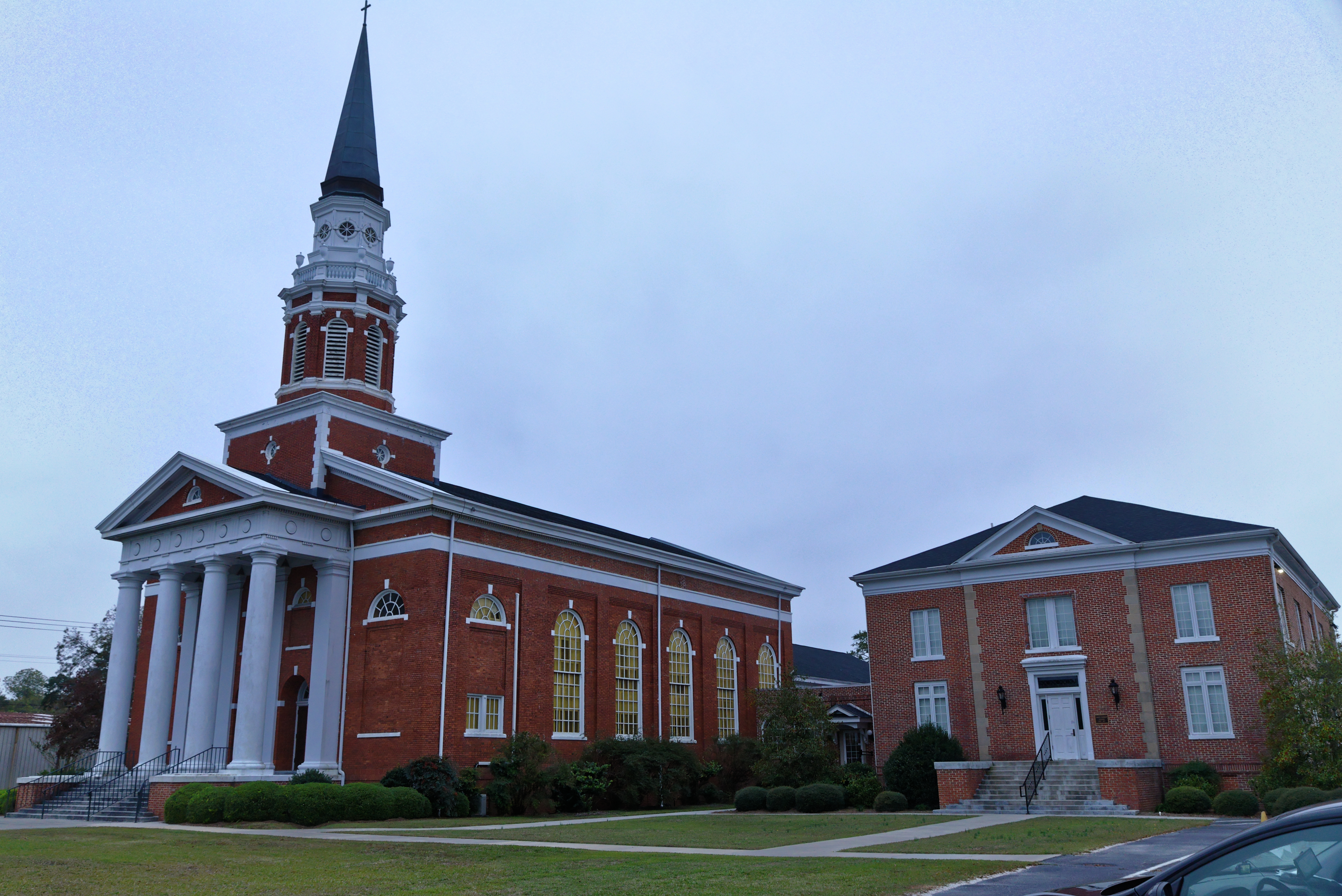

- Location within South Carolina Location within the United States
- Location: 246 S. Main St., Darlington, South Carolina
- Coordinates: 34°17′59″N 79°52′12″W
- Area: 3 acres (1.2 ha)
- Built: 1912
- Architectural style: Colonial Revival, Georgian Revival
- MPS: City of Darlington MRA
- NRHP reference No.: 88000061
- Added to NRHP: October 17, 1991

First Baptist Church is a historic church at 246 S. Main Street in Darlington, South Carolina. It was built in 1912 and added to the National Register of Historic Places in 1991.
