= Pine Ridge, Darlington County, South Carolina =

Pine Ridge, South Carolina
- Census-designated place
- Location within South Carolina Location within the United States
- Coordinates: 34°23′34″N 80°10′05″W
- Country: United States
- State: South Carolina
- County: Darlington

Area
  - Total: 2.27 sq mi (5.88 km^{2})
  - Land: 2.27 sq mi (5.88 km^{2})
  - Water: 0.0039 sq mi (0.01 km^{2})
- Elevation: 253 ft (77 m)

Population (2020)
  - Total: 807
  - Density: 356/sq mi (137.3/km^{2})
- Time zone: UTC-5 (Eastern (EST))
  - Summer (DST): UTC-4 (EDT)
- ZIP Code: 29550 (Hartsville)
- Area codes: 843/854
- FIPS code: 45-56905
- GNIS feature ID: 2812948

Pine Ridge is an unincorporated community and census-designated place (CDP) in Darlington County, South Carolina, United States. It was first listed as a CDP prior to the 2020 census with a population of 807.

The CDP is in northwestern Darlington County, along South Carolina Highway 151, which leads southeast 6 miles (10 km) to Hartsville and northwest 7 miles (11 km) to McBee. A portion of the eastern border of the CDP follows Black Creek, a southeast-flowing tributary of the Great Pee Dee River, and the south border of the CDP follows Beaverdam Creek, an east-flowing tributary of Black Creek. The H. B. Robinson Nuclear Generating Station is just outside the northeast border of the CDP, adjacent to Lake Robinson, a reservoir built on Black Creek.

== Demographics ==
Historical population
Census	Pop.	Note	%±
2020	807		—
U.S. Decennial Census; 2020

Pine Ridge first appeared as a census designated place in the 2020 U.S. census.

=== 2020 census ===
Pine Ridge CDP, South Carolina – Demographic Profile (NH = Non-Hispanic)
Race / Ethnicity	Pop 2020	% 2020
White alone (NH)	643	79.68%
Black or African American alone (NH)	73	9.05%
Native American or Alaska Native alone (NH)	5	0.62%
Asian alone (NH)	9	1.12%
Pacific Islander alone (NH)	0	0.00%
Some Other Race alone (NH)	5	0.62%
Mixed Race/Multi-Racial (NH)	20	2.48%
Hispanic or Latino (any race)	52	6.44%
Total	807	100.00%

Note: the US Census treats Hispanic/Latino as an ethnic category. This table excludes Latinos from the racial categories and assigns them to a separate category. Hispanics/Latinos can be of any race.
