= Wilds-Edwards House =

Historic house in South Carolina, United States

- Wilds--Edwards House
- U.S. National Register of Historic Places
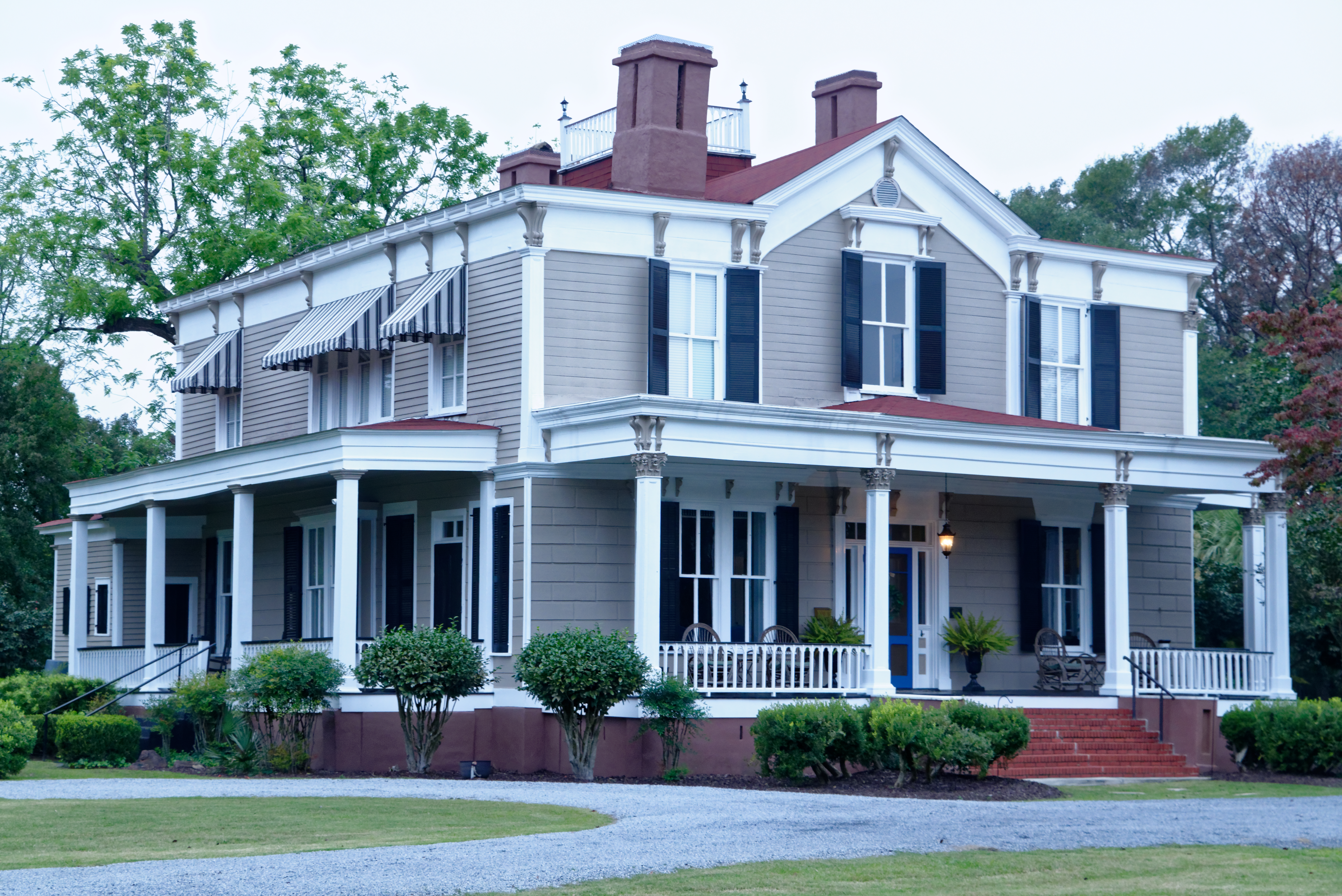

- Location within South Carolina Location within the United States
- Location: 120 Edwards Ave., Darlington, South Carolina
- Coordinates: 34°17′54″N 79°52′33″W
- Area: 2.7 acres (1.1 ha)
- Built: 1856
- Architect: Klickner, J.L.
- Architectural style: Italianate
- MPS: City of Darlington MRA
- NRHP reference No.: 88000034
- Added to NRHP: February 10, 1988

The Wilds-Edwards House is an antebellum residence in the city of Darlington, South Carolina. It is listed in the National Register of Historic Places.

The Wilds-Edwards House was built around 1856 by Col. Samuel H. Wilds and designed by J.L. Klickner in the Italianate style. The house was purchased from the Wilds estate in 1870 by the Hon. Berryman Wheeler Edwards, a graduate of Harvard Law School (1853), Confederate veteran, and state senator (1886–89). It remained in the Edwards family until the 1990s.

According to local tradition, the Wilds-Edwards house was not destroyed by General William T. Sherman's army during the Campaign of the Carolinas because Klickner was in the detachment sent to burn Darlington and he persuaded the captain of the raiding company to delay its destruction. In the meantime, the Union troops encountered General Joseph Wheeler's cavalry and were unable to return to burn Darlington.
