= William Wesley Hicks =

American politician (1843–1925)

W. W. Hicks

Member of the Louisiana House of Representatives
- In office 1900–1904
- Preceded by: McIntyre H. Sandlin
- Succeeded by: E. L. Stewart

Personal details
- Born: William Wesley Hicks; July 9, 1843 Darlington County, South Carolina, U.S.
- Died: September 23, 1925 (aged 82) Shongaloo, Louisiana, U.S.
- Party: Democratic

William Wesley Hicks (July 9, 1843 – September 23, 1925) was an American politician. A member of the Democratic Party, he served in the Louisiana House of Representatives from 1900 to 1904.

Hicks was born in Darlington County, South Carolina. In 1900, he was elected to the Louisiana House of Representatives, succeeding McIntyre H. Sandlin. Hicks was succeeded by E. L. Stewart in 1904. After that, he served as a member of the Webster Parish Police Jury from 1904 to 1908.

Hicks died in September 1925 in Shongaloo, Louisiana, at the age of 82. He was buried in Gilgal Cemetery.
