= Hudson House (Albuquerque, New Mexico) =

Historic house in New Mexico, United States

- U.S. National Register of Historic Places
- NM State Register of Cultural Properties
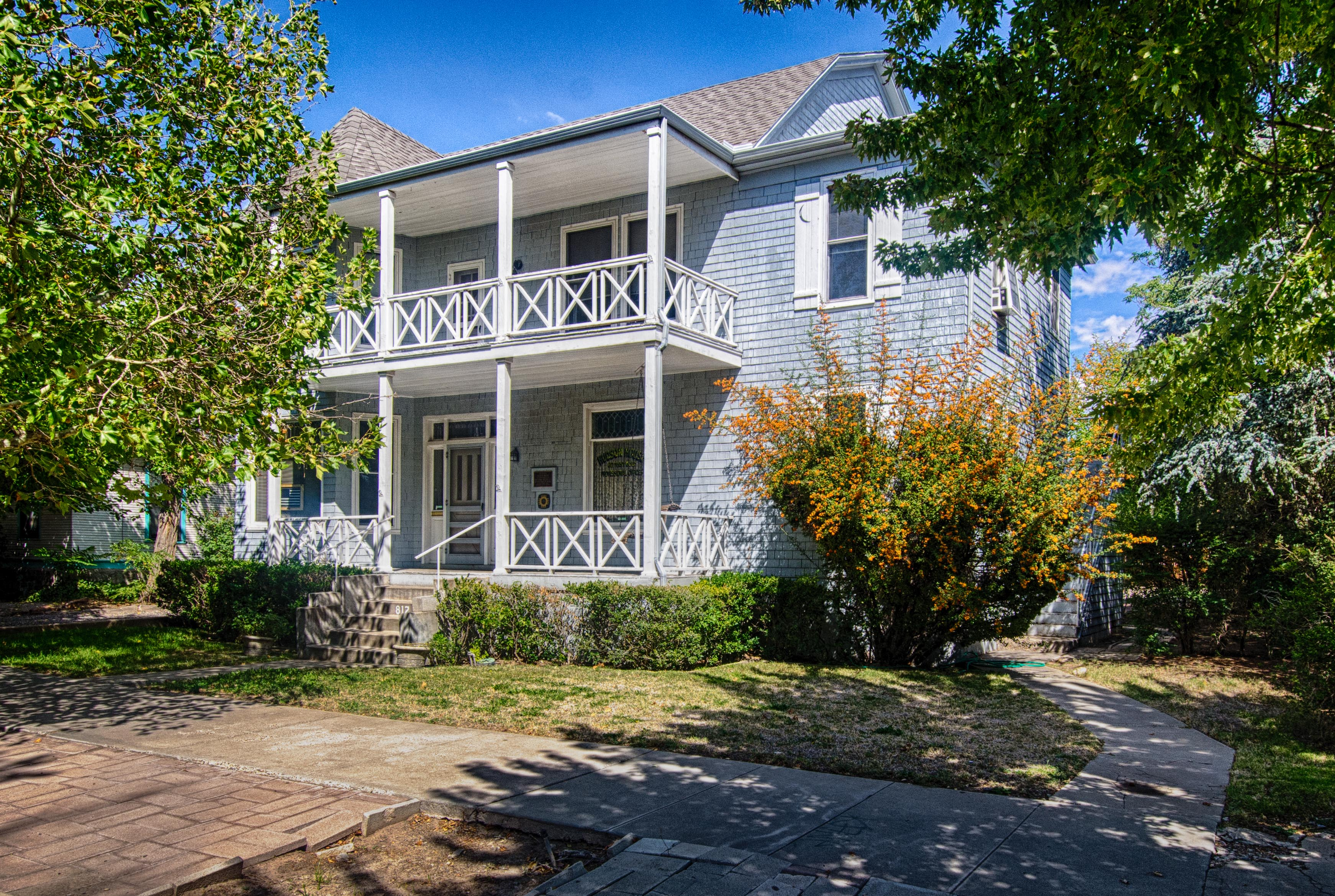
- The house in 2012

- Location within New Mexico Location within the United States
- Location: 817 Gold Ave. SW, Albuquerque, New Mexico
- Coordinates: 35°5′4″N 106°39′24″W
- Built: 1906
- NRHP reference No.: 82003313
- NMSRCP No.: 839

Significant dates
- Added to NRHP: February 24, 1982
- Designated NMSRCP: October 23, 1981

The Hudson House is a historic house in Albuquerque, New Mexico. It was built in 1906 by Clarence Hudson, a painter and interior decorator who owned a poster company, and his wife Rose. After their respective deaths, the house was converted into apartments in 1941 with the addition of side and rear wings. The side addition was designed by Tom Danahy, who designed a number of other buildings in the city including the Jones Motor Company. The building was renovated in the 1980s and converted into law offices. It was added to the New Mexico State Register of Cultural Properties in 1981 and the National Register of Historic Places in 1982.

The house is a 2 1/2-story frame building with a gambrel roof and a large two-story porch supported by simple square pillars which are reminiscent of the Territorial Style. The exterior is entirely covered in wooden shingles with simple wood trim. The west end of the front elevation has a double-height bay window topped by a peaked roof, while there is a one-bay addition at the east end which was designed to blend with the existing building. The property also includes a gambrel-roofed frame carriage house, probably dating to the same period as the main house.
