= Darlington County, South Carolina =

County in South Carolina, United States

- County
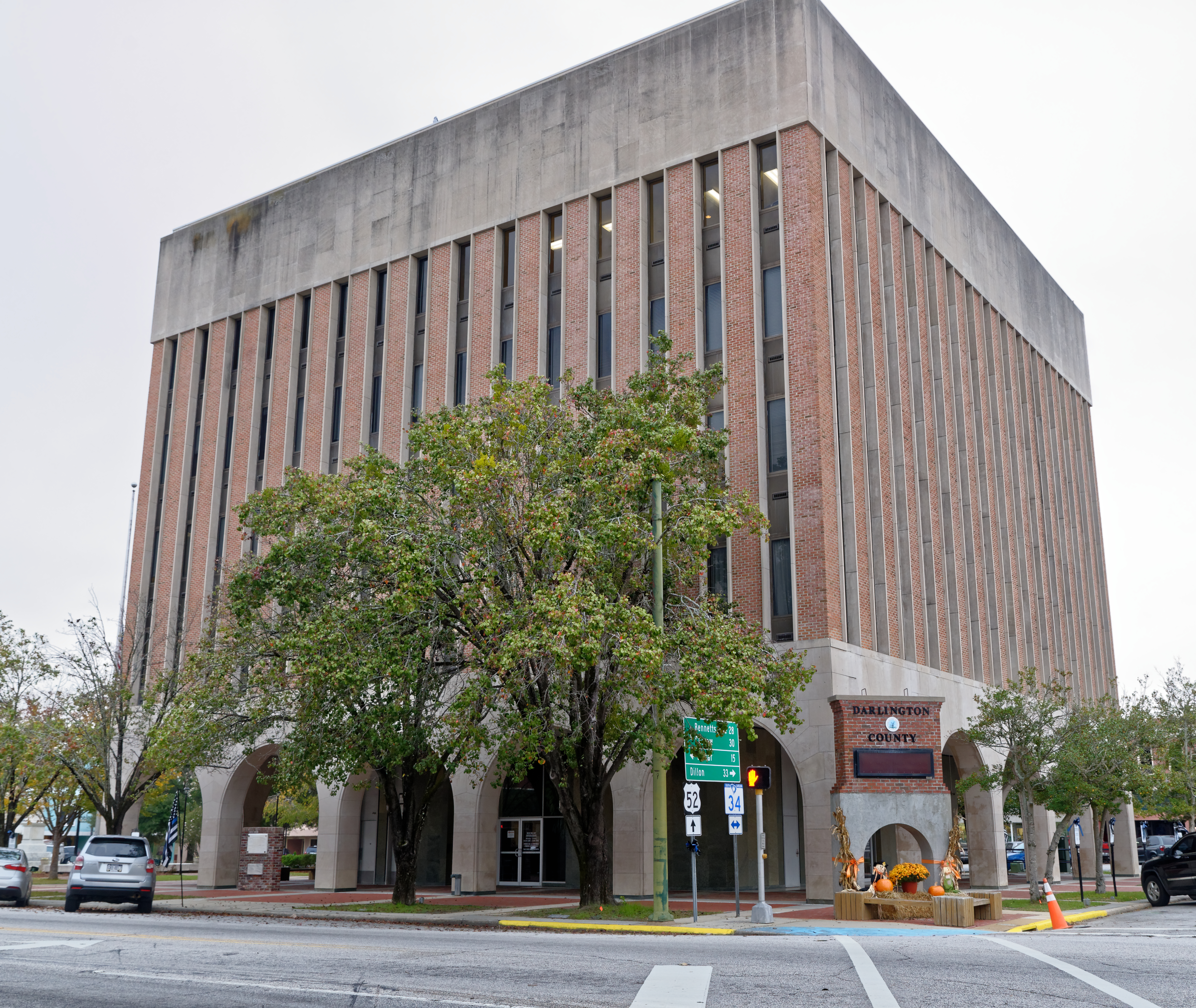
- Darlington County Courthouse

- Seal
- Motto(s): "Experience Darlington County, South Carolina, At The Speed Of Life"
- Location within the U.S. state of South Carolina
- Interactive map of Darlington County, South Carolina
- Coordinates: 34.33°N 79.96°W
- Country: United States
- State: South Carolina
- Founded: 1785
- Named for: Unknown; possibly Darlington, England
- Seat: Darlington
- Largest community: Hartsville

Area
  - Total: 566.25 sq mi (1,466.6 km^{2})
  - Land: 560.59 sq mi (1,451.9 km^{2})
  - Water: 5.66 sq mi (14.7 km^{2}) 1.00%

Population (2020)
  - Total: 62,905
  - Estimate (2025): 62,888 ▼
  - Density: 112.21/sq mi (43.325/km^{2})
- Time zone: UTC−5 (Eastern)
  - Summer (DST): UTC−4 (EDT)
- Congressional district: 7th
- Website: www.darcosc.com

Darlington County is a county in the U.S. state of South Carolina. As of the 2020 census, its population was 62,905. Its county seat is Darlington. Hartsville is the largest community in the county. Darlington County is home to the Darlington Raceway, which hosts the annual NASCAR Southern 500. Darlington County is also home to Coker College in Hartsville. Darlington County was named by an act in March 1785. Darlington County is included in the Florence, SC Metropolitan Statistical Area.

== History ==
The county was founded in 1785. While no records exist regarding the namesake of the county, it could possibly be named after Darlington, England. The county seat is Darlington and the largest community is Hartsville.

== Geography ==
According to the U.S. Census Bureau, the county has a total area of 566.25 square miles (1,466.6 km^{2}), of which 560.59 square miles (1,451.9 km^{2}) is land and 5.66 square miles (14.7 km^{2}) (1.00%) is water.

=== State and local protected areas/sites ===
- Great Pee Dee River Heritage Preserve Wildlife Management Area
- Kalmia Gardens
- Segars-McKinnon Heritage Preserve

=== Major water bodies ===
- Back Swamp
- Black Creek
- Cedar Creek
- Great Pee Dee River
- High Hill Creek
- Lake Robinson
- Lynches River
- Sparrow Swamp

=== Adjacent counties ===
- Florence County – southeast
- Marlboro County – northeast
- Chesterfield County – northwest
- Lee County – southwest
- Kershaw County – west

=== Major highways ===
- I-20
- I-95
- US 15
- US 15 Bus.
- US 52
- US 52 Bus.
- US 401
- SC 34
- SC 34 Conn.
- SC 34 Truck
- SC 102
- SC 151
- SC 151 Bus.
- SC 340
- SC 403

=== Major infrastructure ===
- Darlington County Jetport
- Darlington Raceway
- Hartsville Regional Airport

== Demographics ==
Historical population
| Census | Pop. | Note | %± |
|---|---|---|---|
| 1800 | 7,631 | | — |
| 1810 | 9,047 | | 18.6% |
| 1820 | 10,949 | | 21.0% |
| 1830 | 13,728 | | 25.4% |
| 1840 | 14,822 | | 8.0% |
| 1850 | 16,830 | | 13.5% |
| 1860 | 20,361 | | 21.0% |
| 1870 | 26,243 | | 28.9% |
| 1880 | 34,485 | | 31.4% |
| 1890 | 29,134 | | −15.5% |
| 1900 | 32,388 | | 11.2% |
| 1910 | 36,027 | | 11.2% |
| 1920 | 39,126 | | 8.6% |
| 1930 | 41,427 | | 5.9% |
| 1940 | 45,198 | | 9.1% |
| 1950 | 50,016 | | 10.7% |
| 1960 | 52,928 | | 5.8% |
| 1970 | 53,442 | | 1.0% |
| 1980 | 62,717 | | 17.4% |
| 1990 | 61,851 | | −1.4% |
| 2000 | 67,394 | | 9.0% |
| 2010 | 68,681 | | 1.9% |
| 2020 | 62,905 | | −8.4% |
| 2025 (est.) | 62,888 | ▼ | 0.0% |
U.S. Decennial Census; 1790–1960 1900–1990; 1990–2000 2010 2020

=== Racial and ethnic composition ===
Darlington County, South Carolina – Racial and ethnic composition Note: the US Census treats Hispanic/Latino as an ethnic category. This table excludes Latinos from the racial categories and assigns them to a separate category. Hispanics/Latinos may be of any race.
| Race / Ethnicity (NH = Non-Hispanic) | Pop 1980 | Pop 1990 | Pop 2000 | Pop 2010 | Pop 2020 | % 1980 | % 1990 | % 2000 | % 2010 | % 2020 |
|---|---|---|---|---|---|---|---|---|---|---|
| White alone (NH) | 37,260 | 36,794 | 38,161 | 37,993 | 33,821 | 59.41% | 59.49% | 56.62% | 55.32% | 53.77% |
| Black or African American alone (NH) | 24,750 | 24,707 | 27,970 | 28,463 | 25,386 | 39.46% | 39.95% | 41.50% | 41.44% | 40.36% |
| Native American or Alaska Native alone (NH) | 16 | 71 | 125 | 184 | 136 | 0.03% | 0.11% | 0.19% | 0.27% | 0.22% |
| Asian alone (NH) | 40 | 65 | 142 | 201 | 290 | 0.06% | 0.11% | 0.21% | 0.29% | 0.46% |
| Native Hawaiian or Pacific Islander alone (NH) | x | x | 5 | 6 | 4 | x | x | 0.01% | 0.01% | 0.01% |
| Other race alone (NH) | 32 | 3 | 29 | 38 | 128 | 0.05% | 0.00% | 0.04% | 0.06% | 0.20% |
| Mixed race or Multiracial (NH) | x | x | 304 | 656 | 1,744 | x | x | 0.45% | 0.96% | 2.77% |
| Hispanic or Latino (any race) | 619 | 211 | 658 | 1,140 | 1,396 | 0.99% | 0.34% | 0.98% | 1.66% | 2.22% |
| Total | 62,717 | 61,851 | 67,394 | 68,681 | 62,905 | 100.00% | 100.00% | 100.00% | 100.00% | 100.00% |

=== 2020 census ===
As of the 2020 census, the county had a population of 62,905. The median age was 42.9 years. 21.9% of residents were under the age of 18 and 20.3% of residents were 65 years of age or older. For every 100 females there were 88.5 males, and for every 100 females age 18 and over there were 84.8 males age 18 and over.

The racial makeup of the county was 54.2% White, 40.6% Black or African American, 0.3% American Indian and Alaska Native, 0.5% Asian, 0.0% Native Hawaiian and Pacific Islander, 1.1% from some other race, and 3.3% from two or more races. Hispanic or Latino residents of any race comprised 2.2% of the population.

42.9% of residents lived in urban areas, while 57.1% lived in rural areas.

There were 25,649 households in the county, of which 29.1% had children under the age of 18 living with them and 35.6% had a female householder with no spouse or partner present. About 29.7% of all households were made up of individuals and 14.2% had someone living alone who was 65 years of age or older. Of those households, 17,344 were families.

There were 29,379 housing units, of which 12.7% were vacant. Among occupied housing units, 70.3% were owner-occupied and 29.7% were renter-occupied. The homeowner vacancy rate was 1.8% and the rental vacancy rate was 10.2%.

=== 2010 census ===
At the 2010 census, there were 68,681 people, 26,531 households, and 18,552 families living in the county. The population density was 122.4 inhabitants per square mile (47.3/km^{2}). There were 30,297 housing units at an average density of 54.0 per square mile (20.8/km^{2}). The racial makeup of the county was 55.9% white, 41.6% black or African American, 0.3% Asian, 0.3% American Indian, 0.9% from other races, and 1.1% from two or more races. Those of Hispanic or Latino origin made up 1.7% of the population. In terms of ancestry, 9.5% were American, 7.0% were English, and 5.3% were Irish.

Of the 26,531 households, 34.1% had children under the age of 18 living with them, 44.0% were married couples living together, 20.5% had a female householder with no husband present, 30.1% were non-families, and 26.0% of all households were made up of individuals. The average household size was 2.54 and the average family size was 3.04. The median age was 39.6 years.

The median income for a household in the county was $38,379 and the median income for a family was $46,894. Males had a median income of $40,089 versus $29,255 for females. The per capita income for the county was $20,096. About 14.6% of families and 20.0% of the population were below the poverty line, including 30.7% of those under age 18 and 15.1% of those age 65 or over.

=== 2000 census ===
At the 2000 census, there were 67,394 people, 25,793 households, and 18,441 families living in the county. The population density was 120 inhabitants per square mile (46/km^{2}). There were 28,942 housing units at an average density of 52 per square mile (20/km^{2}). The racial makeup of the county was 56.98% White, 41.70% Black or African American, 0.19% Native American, 0.21% Asian, 0.01% Pacific Islander, 0.39% from other races, and 0.52% from two or more races. 0.98% of the population were Hispanic or Latino of any race.

There were 25,793 households, out of which 32.20% had children under the age of 18 living with them, 48.30% were married couples living together, 18.70% had a female householder with no husband present, and 28.50% were non-families. 25.10% of all households were made up of individuals, and 9.20% had someone living alone who was 65 years of age or older. The average household size was 2.57 and the average family size was 3.07.

In the county, the population was spread out, with 26.30% under the age of 18, 9.00% from 18 to 24, 28.20% from 25 to 44, 24.40% from 45 to 64, and 12.10% who were 65 years of age or older. The median age was 36 years. For every 100 females, there were 89.80 males. For every 100 females age 18 and over, there were 84.60 males.

The median income for a household in the county was $31,087, and the median income for a family was $37,662. Males had a median income of $30,947 versus $20,998 for females. The per capita income for the county was $16,283. About 16.40% of families and 20.30% of the population were below the poverty line, including 26.70% of those under age 18 and 22.10% of those age 65 or over.

According to the 2000 census, Darlington County was classified as 41% urban and 59% rural. It contains the two urbanized areas of Hartsville (2000 pop. 14,907) and Darlington (12,066). The county's population is included within the Florence, SC Metropolitan Statistical Area.

== Government and politics ==
United States presidential election results for Darlington County, South Carolina
| Year | Republican | | Democratic | | Third party(ies) | |
| Year | No. | % | No. | % | No. | % |
|---|---|---|---|---|---|---|
| 1900 | 83 | 6.32% | 1,230 | 93.68% | 0 | 0.00% |
| 1904 | 42 | 2.79% | 1,464 | 97.21% | 0 | 0.00% |
| 1912 | 0 | 0.00% | 883 | 99.77% | 2 | 0.23% |
| 1916 | 5 | 0.34% | 1,462 | 99.46% | 3 | 0.20% |
| 1920 | 18 | 1.41% | 1,262 | 98.59% | 0 | 0.00% |
| 1924 | 3 | 0.31% | 956 | 98.96% | 7 | 0.72% |
| 1928 | 48 | 4.06% | 1,135 | 95.94% | 0 | 0.00% |
| 1932 | 31 | 2.15% | 1,409 | 97.78% | 1 | 0.07% |
| 1936 | 12 | 0.60% | 1,995 | 99.40% | 0 | 0.00% |
| 1940 | 60 | 4.12% | 1,395 | 95.88% | 0 | 0.00% |
| 1944 | 46 | 2.33% | 1,808 | 91.41% | 124 | 6.27% |
| 1948 | 104 | 3.77% | 726 | 26.30% | 1,930 | 69.93% |
| 1952 | 3,463 | 37.72% | 5,718 | 62.28% | 0 | 0.00% |
| 1956 | 1,597 | 22.47% | 2,908 | 40.91% | 2,603 | 36.62% |
| 1960 | 3,494 | 42.81% | 4,668 | 57.19% | 0 | 0.00% |
| 1964 | 6,717 | 57.28% | 5,010 | 42.72% | 0 | 0.00% |
| 1968 | 4,947 | 35.38% | 3,803 | 27.20% | 5,231 | 37.42% |
| 1972 | 11,756 | 72.04% | 4,414 | 27.05% | 149 | 0.91% |
| 1976 | 6,678 | 39.52% | 10,165 | 60.16% | 54 | 0.32% |
| 1980 | 8,289 | 48.39% | 8,489 | 49.55% | 353 | 2.06% |
| 1984 | 11,100 | 58.70% | 7,456 | 39.43% | 354 | 1.87% |
| 1988 | 9,854 | 55.23% | 7,625 | 42.73% | 364 | 2.04% |
| 1992 | 8,912 | 44.00% | 9,090 | 44.88% | 2,251 | 11.11% |
| 1996 | 8,220 | 45.18% | 8,943 | 49.15% | 1,031 | 5.67% |
| 2000 | 11,290 | 51.64% | 10,253 | 46.90% | 320 | 1.46% |
| 2004 | 13,416 | 52.71% | 11,829 | 46.47% | 209 | 0.82% |
| 2008 | 14,544 | 49.58% | 14,505 | 49.45% | 285 | 0.97% |
| 2012 | 14,434 | 47.87% | 15,457 | 51.27% | 259 | 0.86% |
| 2016 | 14,989 | 50.51% | 13,888 | 46.80% | 797 | 2.69% |
| 2020 | 16,832 | 51.92% | 15,220 | 46.95% | 365 | 1.13% |
| 2024 | 17,017 | 56.10% | 12,977 | 42.78% | 337 | 1.11% |

== Economy ==
In 2022, the GDP of Darlington County was $3.3 billion (approx. $52,531 per capita). In chained 2017 dollars, its real GDP was $2.7 billion (approx. $42,579 per capita). Between 2022 and 2024, the unemployment rate has fluctuated between 2.4-4.2% within the county.

As of April 2024, some of the largest employers in the county include Coker University, Duke Energy Progress Inc, Sonoco, and Walmart.

Employment and Wage Statistics by Industry in Darlington County, South Carolina
| Industry | Employment Counts | Employment Percentage (%) | Average Annual Wage ($) |
|---|---|---|---|
| Accommodation and Food Services | 1,654 | 8.1 | 17,212 |
| Administrative and Support and Waste Management and Remediation Services | 1,066 | 5.2 | 39,832 |
| Agriculture, Forestry, Fishing and Hunting | 150 | 0.7 | 34,424 |
| Arts, Entertainment, and Recreation | 277 | 1.4 | 18,304 |
| Construction | 1,400 | 6.9 | 53,872 |
| Educational Services | 1,577 | 7.7 | 40,248 |
| Finance and Insurance | 345 | 1.7 | 60,008 |
| Health Care and Social Assistance | 2,801 | 13.7 | 46,072 |
| Information | 49 | 0.2 | 93,028 |
| Management of Companies and Enterprises | 92 | 0.5 | 67,392 |
| Manufacturing | 3,849 | 18.9 | 86,164 |
| Other Services (except Public Administration) | 503 | 2.5 | 34,112 |
| Professional, Scientific, and Technical Services | 331 | 1.6 | 48,620 |
| Public Administration | 1,424 | 7.0 | 39,364 |
| Real Estate and Rental and Leasing | 99 | 0.5 | 61,880 |
| Retail Trade | 2,370 | 11.6 | 30,992 |
| Transportation and Warehousing | 940 | 4.6 | 50,596 |
| Utilities | 736 | 3.6 | 107,744 |
| Wholesale Trade | 740 | 3.6 | 73,684 |
| Total | 20,403 | 100.0% | 52,075 |

== Communities ==
=== Cities ===
- Darlington (county seat)
- Hartsville (largest community)

=== Towns ===
- Lamar
- Society Hill

=== Census-designated places ===
- Dovesville
- Lydia
- North Hartsville
- Pine Ridge

=== Other unincorporated communities ===
- Clyde
- Mont Clare
- Una

== Notable people ==
- Harry G. Byrd, Major League Baseball right-handed starting pitcher who played for the Philadelphia Athletics, New York Yankees, Baltimore Orioles, Chicago White Sox, and Detroit Tigers. He was born in Darlington. SC 151 in Darlington is named Harry Byrd Highway in his honor.
- William G. Farrow, lieutenant in the United States Army Air Corps who participated in the Doolittle Raid; born in Darlington in 1918
- Albert Haynesworth, a professional football player who played primarily for the Tennessee Titans and Washington Redskins; born in Hartsville
- W. W. Hicks, member of the Louisiana House of Representatives for Webster Parish, 1900 to 1904; born in Darlington County in 1843
- Orlando Hudson, former Major League baseball player; born in Darlington
- Jordan Lyles, Major League baseball player; born in Hartsville.
- Bobo Newsom, Major League Baseball pitcher with the Tigers, Senators, Cubs, Dodgers, Yankees, Giants, and Red Sox. He compiled a 211–222 record over 20 seasons, including a 21–5 season in 1940. SC 151 in Hartsville is named Bobo Newsom Highway in his honor.
- James E. Williams, sailor of the United States Navy during the 1950s and 1960s. He was the most highly decorated enlisted man in the history of the United States Navy and a recipient of the Congressional Medal of Honor.

== See also ==
- List of counties in South Carolina
- National Register of Historic Places listings in Darlington County, South Carolina
